= List of id Software games =

Video games by developer

id Software is an American video game developer based in Richardson, Texas. It was founded in February 1991 by four members of the software company Softdisk: programmers John Carmack and John Romero, game designer Tom Hall, and artist Adrian Carmack. The founders, along with business manager Jay Wilbur, had previously developed the 1990 PC game Commander Keen in Invasion of the Vorticons as "Ideas from the Deep" while still employees of Softdisk. After its founding, id developed further shareware computer games in the Commander Keen series for Apogee Software, as well as a series of small games for Softdisk, before releasing the "grandfather of first-person shooters", Wolfenstein 3D, in 1992 through both shareware and retail. It was followed by Doom (1993), considered one of the most significant and influential titles in video game history, which id self-published in shareware before releasing for retail through GT Interactive. GT Interactive published a sequel, Doom II (1994) and the two companies split publishing duties on id's final self-published or shareware game, Quake (1996).

The company has focused primarily on further computer and mobile games in the Doom and Quake series since 1993, with the addition of the Rage series: Rage: Mutant Bash TV (2010), Rage (2011), and Rage 2 (2019). Additionally, it co-developed a set of mobile phone games with Fountainhead Entertainment in 2005–2009, including Orcs & Elves (2006), Orcs & Elves II (2007), and Wolfenstein RPG (2008). It has released nine Doom games and five Quake titles in total. These games have been published through retail primarily by Activision, EA Mobile, and Bethesda Softworks. Additionally, id published three games in the Heretic series by Raven Software in 1994–1997, before ceasing its publishing operations. In 2009, id was purchased by ZeniMax Media, the parent company of Bethesda. The company's latest release is the first-person shooter Doom: The Dark Ages (2025).

== Games ==
List of games
Game	Details
Commander Keen in Invasion of the Vorticons Original release date: December 14, 1990	Release years by system: 1990 – MS-DOS
Commander Keen in Invasion of the Vorticons Original release date: December 14, 1990	Notes: Side-scrolling platform game; Divided into three episodes: "Marooned on Mars", "The Earth Explodes", and "Keen Must Die!"; Developed as by "Ideas from the Deep" and published as shareware by Apogee Software: "Marooned on Mars" was released for free, with the other two episodes available for purchase; Included in the id Anthology (1996), Commander Keen (1998), Commander Keen Combo CD (2001), Commander Keen Complete Pack (2007), and 3D Realms Anthology (2014) compilations
Shadow Knights Original release date: 1991	Release years by system: 1991 – MS-DOS
Shadow Knights Original release date: 1991	Notes: Side-scrolling platform game; Published by Softdisk (Note: As Ideas from the Deep developed Commander Keen in Invasion of the Vorticons while still employees of Softdisk using Softdisk computers, after id Software was founded they agreed to develop nine games for the company. One, ScubaVenture: The Search for Pirate's Treasure, was developed on their behalf by Apogee Software instead.); Development began while employees of Softdisk, and completed as id Software; Included in The Lost Game Collection of Id Software (1992) and id Anthology (1996) compilations
Hovertank 3D Original release date: April 1991	Release years by system: 1991 – MS-DOS
Hovertank 3D Original release date: April 1991	Notes: First-person shooter; Published by Softdisk; Included in The Lost Game Collection of Id Software (1992) and id Anthology (1996) compilations
Dangerous Dave in the Haunted Mansion Original release date: 1991	Release years by system: 1991 – MS-DOS; 2008 – Mobile phones
Dangerous Dave in the Haunted Mansion Original release date: 1991	Notes: Side-scrolling platform game; Published by Softdisk; Included in The Lost Game Collection of Id Software (1992) and id Anthology (1996) compilations
Rescue Rover Original release date: 1991	Release years by system: 1991 – MS-DOS
Rescue Rover Original release date: 1991	Notes: Puzzle game; Published by Softdisk as shareware, with the first ten out of twenty levels released for free; Included in The Lost Game Collection of Id Software (1992) and id Anthology (1996) compilations
Commander Keen in Keen Dreams Original release date: 1991	Release years by system: 1991 – MS-DOS; 2013 – Android; 2015 – Windows, Linux; 2016 – macOS; 2019 – Nintendo Switch
Commander Keen in Keen Dreams Original release date: 1991	Notes: Side-scrolling platform game; Published by Softdisk; Android port (2013) developed by Super Fighter Team; Windows, Linux, and MacOS ports (2015–16) developed by Hard Disk Publishing, Nintendo Switch port developed by Lone Wolf Technology; Included in The Lost Game Collection of Id Software (1992) and id Anthology (1996) compilations
Rescue Rover 2 Original release date: 1991	Release years by system: 1991 – MS-DOS
Rescue Rover 2 Original release date: 1991	Notes: Puzzle game; Published by Softdisk; Included in The Lost Game Collection of Id Software (1992) and id Anthology (1996) compilations
Catacomb 3-D Original release date: November 1991	Release years by system: 1991 – MS-DOS
Catacomb 3-D Original release date: November 1991	Notes: First-person shooter; Published by Softdisk; Included in The Lost Game Collection of Id Software (1992) and id Anthology (1996) compilations
Commander Keen in Goodbye, Galaxy Original release date: December 15, 1991	Release years by system: 1991 – MS-DOS
Commander Keen in Goodbye, Galaxy Original release date: December 15, 1991	Notes: Side-scrolling platform game; Divided into two episodes: "Secret of the Oracle" and "The Armageddon Machine"; Published as shareware by Apogee Software: "Secret of the Oracle" was released for free, with the other episode available for purchase; Included in the id Anthology (1996), Commander Keen (1998), Commander Keen Combo CD (2001), Commander Keen Complete Pack (2007), and 3D Realms Anthology (2014) compilations
Commander Keen in Aliens Ate My Babysitter Original release date: December 1991	Release years by system: 1991 – MS-DOS
Commander Keen in Aliens Ate My Babysitter Original release date: December 1991	Notes: Side-scrolling platform game; Published by FormGen; Originally intended as the third episode of Commander Keen in Goodbye, Galaxy before being converted to a standalone retail title; Included in the id Anthology (1996) compilation
Wolfenstein 3D Original release date: May 5, 1992	Release years by system: 1992 – MS-DOS; 1994 – Super Nintendo Entertainment System, Mac OS, Atari Jaguar, Acorn Archimedes; 1995 – 3DO; 1998 – Apple IIGS, PC-98; 2002 – Game Boy Advance; 2009 – Xbox Live Arcade, PlayStation Network, iOS; 2012 – Web browsers
Wolfenstein 3D Original release date: May 5, 1992	Notes: First-person shooter; Divided into two sets of three episodes: "Escape from Castle Wolfenstein", "Operation: Eisenfaust", and "Die, Führer, Die!", followed by "A Dark Secret", "Trail of the Madman", and "Confrontation"; Published as shareware by Apogee: "Escape from Castle Wolfenstein" was released for free, with the other episodes available for purchase; An additional episode, "Spear of Destiny" (1992), was published as a retail game by FormGen; two further episodes, "Return to Danger" and "Ultimate Challenge" (1994), were developed and published by Formgen; The first six episodes were published together as a retail title by GT Interactive (1993); The three FormGen episodes were published together as a retail title by FormGen as the "Spear of Destiny Super CD Package" (1994); All nine episodes were published together as a retail title by Activision (1998); Included in the id Anthology (1996) and 3D Realms Anthology (2014) compilations
Tiles of the Dragon Original release date: 1992	Release years by system: 1992 – MS-DOS
Tiles of the Dragon Original release date: 1992	Notes: Mahjong solitaire; Published by Softdisk; Included in The Lost Game Collection of Id Software (1992) compilation
Doom Original release date: December 10, 1993	Release years by system: 1993 – MS-DOS, AmigaOS; 1994 – 32X, Atari Jaguar, Mac OS (Note: Unofficial ports of Doom and Doom II to Linux were released by id programmer Dave Taylor in 1994; they were hosted by id but not supported or made official.); 1995 – Super Nintendo Entertainment System, PlayStation, Windows; 1996 – 3DO; 1997 – Sega Saturn; 2001 – Game Boy Advance; 2006 – Xbox 360; 2009 – iOS; 2012 – PlayStation 3; 2019 – Nintendo Switch
Doom Original release date: December 10, 1993	Notes: First-person shooter; Divided into three episodes: "Knee-Deep in the Dead", "The Shores of Hell", and "Inferno"; Self-published as shareware by id Software; after release, also published as a retail title by GT Interactive; An upgraded version titled The Ultimate Doom (1995) includes a fourth episode, "Thy Flesh Consumed"; Ported to nearly every possible console and platform, both officially and unofficially, including esotera such as smart thermostats and oscilloscopes; variations on "It runs Doom" or "Can it run Doom?" are long-running phrases about the widespread porting of the game; Included in the id Anthology (1996) compilation
Doom II Original release date: October 10, 1994	Release years by system: 1994 – MS-DOS, Mac OS; 1995 – PlayStation; 2002 – Game Boy Advance; 2003 – Tapwave Zodiac; 2005 – Xbox; 2010 – Xbox 360; 2012 – PlayStation 3
Doom II Original release date: October 10, 1994	Notes: First-person shooter; Published as a retail title by GT Interactive; An expansion pack titled Master Levels for Doom II (1995), created by id, includes 21 commissioned levels and over 3000 user-created levels for Doom and Doom II; An expansion pack titled No Rest for the Living (2010), created by Nerve Software for the Xbox 360 version, includes nine additional levels; it was included in the PlayStation 3 version (2012); Two sets of Doom II levels by different amateur map-making teams were released together by id as Final Doom (1996), a standalone title for DOS, PlayStation, and Mac OS; Included in the id Anthology (1996) compilation
Quake Original release date: June 22, 1996	Release years by system: 1996 – MS-DOS; 1997 – Mac OS, Sega Saturn; 1998 – Nintendo 64, AmigaOS; 1999 – Linux (Note: An unofficial port of Quake to Linux was released by former id programmer Dave Taylor in 1996.); 2005 – Mobile phones
Quake Original release date: June 22, 1996	Notes: First-person shooter; Self-published as shareware by id Software; also published as a retail title by GT Interactive; Two official expansion packs were released in 1997: Quake Mission Pack No. 1: Scourge of Armagon, developed by Hipnotic Interactive, and Quake Mission Pack No. 2: Dissolution of Eternity, developed by Rogue Entertainment. An unofficial third expansion pack, Abyss of Pandemonium (1998), was licensed and developed by Impel Development Team, and a fourth expansion pack, Episode 5: Dimension of the Past, was developed by MachineGames and released for free by ZeniMax Media in 2016; The two official expansion packs were released in a bundle with the original game as Quake: The Offering (1998); An official map collection, Q!ZONE, was developed at published in 1996 by WizardWorks; Included in the id Anthology (1996) and Ultimate Quake (2001) compilations
Quake II Original release date: December 9, 1997	Release years by system: 1997 – Windows; 1999 – Nintendo 64, PlayStation, Linux, macOS; 2005 – Xbox 360
Quake II Original release date: December 9, 1997	Notes: First-person shooter; Published as a retail title by Activision; Two official expansion packs were released in 1998: Quake II Mission Pack: The Reckoning, developed by Xatrix Entertainment, and Quake II Mission Pack: Ground Zero, developed by Rogue Entertainment; The two expansion packs were released in a bundle with the original game as Quake II: Quad Damage (1999); An official collection of mods, Quake II Netpack I: Extremities, was collected by id and published by Activision in 1998; Included in the Ultimate Quake (2001) compilation
Quake III Arena Original release date: December 5, 1999	Release years by system: 1999 – Windows, Linux, macOS; 2000 – Dreamcast; 2001 – PlayStation 2; 2010 – Xbox 360
Quake III Arena Original release date: December 5, 1999	Notes: First-person shooter; Published as a retail title by Activision; An official expansion pack was released in 2000: Quake III: Team Arena, developed by id and published by Activision; Included in the Quake III: Gold (2001) and Ultimate Quake (2001) compilations
Doom 3 Original release date: August 3, 2004	Release years by system: 2004 – Windows, Linux; 2005 – macOS, Xbox; 2012 – PlayStation 3, Xbox 360 (BFG Edition); 2015 – Android (BFG Edition)
Doom 3 Original release date: August 3, 2004	Notes: First-person shooter; Published as a retail title by Activision; An official expansion pack was released in 2005: Doom 3: Resurrection of Evil, developed by Nerve Software and published by Activision; A remastered version of the game, Doom 3: BFG Edition, was released in 2012, including Resurrection of Evil and a new expansion pack The Lost Mission, along with Doom, Doom II and its No Rest For The Living expansion
Doom RPG Original release date: September 19, 2005	Release years by system: 2005 – Mobile phones
Doom RPG Original release date: September 19, 2005	Notes: Turn-based role-playing game; Co-developed with Fountainhead Entertainment and published as a retail title by JAMDAT
Orcs & Elves Original release date: May 2006	Release years by system: 2006 – Mobile phones 2007 – Nintendo DS
Orcs & Elves Original release date: May 2006	Notes: Adventure role-playing game; Co-developed with Fountainhead Entertainment and published as a retail title by EA Mobile
Orcs & Elves II Original release date: December 3, 2007	Release years by system: 2007 – Mobile phones
Orcs & Elves II Original release date: December 3, 2007	Notes: Adventure role-playing game; Co-developed with Fountainhead Entertainment and published as a retail title by EA Mobile
Wolfenstein RPG Original release date: Q3 2008	Release years by system: 2008 – Mobile phones 2009 – iOS
Wolfenstein RPG Original release date: Q3 2008	Notes: First-person shooter/role-playing game; Co-developed with Fountainhead Entertainment and published as a retail title by EA Mobile
Doom II RPG Original release date: November 23, 2009	Release years by system: 2009 – Mobile phones, BlackBerry; 2010 – iOS, Windows Mobile
Doom II RPG Original release date: November 23, 2009	Notes: First-person shooter/role-playing game; Co-developed with Fountainhead Entertainment and published as a retail title by EA Mobile
Quake Live Original release date: August 6, 2010	Release years by system: 2010 – PC
Quake Live Original release date: August 6, 2010	Notes: First-person shooter; Published as a free-to-play browser-based title by Bethesda Softworks, converted to retail title in 2015
Rage: Mutant Bash TV Original release date: November 18, 2010	Release years by system: 2010 – iOS
Rage: Mutant Bash TV Original release date: November 18, 2010	Notes: First-person shooter; Published as a retail title by Bethesda Softworks; Preview iOS tie-in game to Rage
Rage Original release date: October 4, 2011	Release years by system: 2011 – Windows, PlayStation 3, Xbox 360; 2012 – macOS
Rage Original release date: October 4, 2011	Notes: First-person shooter; Published as a retail title by Bethesda Softworks; Three downloadable content packs released: "Wasteland Sewer Missions" (2011), the Anarchy Edition pack (2011), and "The Scorchers" (2012)
Doom Original release date: May 13, 2016	Release years by system: 2016 – Windows, PlayStation 4, Xbox One; 2017 – Nintendo Switch
Doom Original release date: May 13, 2016	Notes: First-person shooter; Published as a retail title by Bethesda Softworks; Three downloadable content packs released: "Unto the Evil" (2016), "Hell Followed" (2017), and "Bloodfall" (2017), as well as several smaller downloadable pieces
Doom VFR Original release date: December 1, 2017	Release years by system: 2017 – Windows, PlayStation 4
Doom VFR Original release date: December 1, 2017	Notes: First-person shooter; Published as a retail title by Bethesda Softworks for HTC Vive and PlayStation VR virtual reality headsets
Rage 2 Original release date: May 14, 2019	Release years by system: 2019 – Windows, PlayStation 4, Xbox One
Rage 2 Original release date: May 14, 2019	Notes: Co-developed with Avalanche Studios; First-person shooter; Published as a retail title by Bethesda Softworks
Doom Eternal Original release date: March 20, 2020	Release years by system: 2020 – Windows, PlayStation 4, Xbox One, Nintendo Switch; 2021 – PlayStation 5, Xbox Series X/S
Doom Eternal Original release date: March 20, 2020	Notes: First-person shooter; Published as a retail title by Bethesda Softworks; A two-part standalone campaign downloadable content titled The Ancient Gods was released in October 2020 and March 2021
Quake Champions Original release date: August 18, 2022	Release years by system: 2022 – Windows
Quake Champions Original release date: August 18, 2022	Notes: Co-developed with Saber Interactive; First-person shooter; Published as an early access title by Bethesda Softworks in 2017; transitioned to a free-to-play title in 2018 while remaining in early access. Moved out of early access in 2022.
Doom: The Dark Ages Original release date: May 15, 2025	Release years by system: 2025 – Windows, PlayStation 5, Xbox Series X/S
Doom: The Dark Ages Original release date: May 15, 2025	Notes: First-person shooter; Published as a retail title by Bethesda Softworks; The first expansion, titled Revelations was released on July 7, 2026.

=== Published games ===
Shortly after the release of its sole self-published game, Doom, in 1993, id briefly moved into publishing works by other developers. The only titles it published were a trilogy of games by Raven Software, which use modified versions of game engines developed by id and featured id employees as producers. A fourth game, Strife, was briefly under development by Cygnus Studios and was to be published by id; after a few months it was cancelled. It was later finished by Rogue Entertainment and published by Velocity in 1996.

List of published games
Game	Details
Heretic Original release date: December 23, 1994	Release years by system: 1994 – MS-DOS; 1999 – Mac OS
Heretic Original release date: December 23, 1994	Notes: First-person shooter; Divided into three episodes: "City of the Damned", "Hell's Maw", and "The Dome of D'Sparil"; Developed by Raven Software and published as shareware by id Software: "City of the Damned" was released for free, with the other two episodes available for purchase; Published as a retail title by GT Interactive as Heretic: Shadow of the Serpent Riders in 1996, with two additional episodes: "The Ossuary" and "The Stagnant Demesne"; Included in the Towers of Darkness: Heretic, Hexen and Beyond (1997) compilation
Hexen: Beyond Heretic Original release date: October 30, 1995	Release years by system: 1995 – MS-DOS; 1997 – Mac OS, PlayStation, Sega Saturn, Nintendo 64
Hexen: Beyond Heretic Original release date: October 30, 1995	Notes: First-person shooter; Developed by Raven Software and published as a retail title by id Software through GT Interactive; An expansion pack, Deathkings of the Dark Citadel, was released in 1996; Included in the Towers of Darkness: Heretic, Hexen and Beyond (1997) compilation
Hexen II Original release date: August 31, 1997	Release years by system: 1997 – Windows; 2002 – macOS
Hexen II Original release date: August 31, 1997	Notes: First-person shooter; Developed by Raven Software and published as a retail title by id Software through Activision; An expansion pack, Hexen II Mission Pack: Portal of Praevus, was published by Activision in 1998

== Sources ==
- Kushner, David (May 11, 2004). Masters of Doom: How Two Guys Created an Empire and Transformed Pop Culture. Random House. ISBN 978-0-8129-7215-3.
