= Doomguy =

Fictional character from the Doom franchise

- Doom character
- The Doom Slayer as he appears in Doom Eternal
- First game: Doom (1993)
- Created by: John Romero
- Designed by: Adrian Carmack; Kevin Cloud
- Voiced by: Matthew Waterson (Doom Eternal); Jason E. Kelley (Doom Eternal: The Ancient Gods – Part Two, Doom: The Dark Ages)
- Portrayed by: Karl Urban (2005 film)

In-universe information
- Full name: Flynn Taggart
- Species: Human
- Relatives: B.J. Blazkowicz (ancestor)

Doomguy, also known as the Doom Slayer, (Note: Also spelled Doom Guy, as well as referred to as the Doom Marine or simply Slayer in Doom (2016), Doom Eternal, and Doom: The Dark Ages) is the protagonist of id Software's Doom franchise. He was created by American video game designer John Romero and was introduced as the player character in the original 1993 video game Doom. Within the Doom series, Doomguy is a demon hunting space marine dressed in green combat armor who rarely speaks on-screen. In Doom Eternal, he is voiced by Matthew Waterson and Jason E. Kelley in that game's downloadable content The Ancient Gods: Part Two, followed by the 2025 prequel Doom: The Dark Ages. A different character with a role similar to that of Doomguy was portrayed by Karl Urban in the 2005 film adaptation.

Doomguy has appeared as a guest character in several other games, including Quake and Tony Hawk's Pro Skater as well as including his likeness as a customizable skin for the Mii Gunner character in Super Smash Bros. Ultimate, and being added as an outfit in Fall Guys and Fortnite. He has received mainly positive reviews.

== Concept and creation ==
The protagonist is not referred to by name in the original 1993 Doom game. In 2002, designer and programmer John Romero described this choice as increasing player immersion: "There was never a name for the marine because it's supposed to be YOU [the player]". Romero further humorously stated in 2020 that the name of the character was "Doom Guy". The character sprites were created by lead artist Adrian Carmack, based on an initial sketch and clay model he made. In 2017, Romero stated that he was the original model of the character for the cover box art. In 2021, Doom Eternal's director Hugo Martin revealed that a female Doomguy was nearly added to the game, but was scrapped due to how much of an endeavor it would have been.

Tom Hall's original design draft, "The Doom Bible", described several planned characters, all of whom went unused in the final version. The sole non-playable character, Buddy Dacote, bore the most similarities to the original game's eventual protagonist. "Dacote" is an acronym for "dies at conclusion of this episode", and Buddy was supposed to be killed by a boss at the end of the planned third episode. In the finished product, this nearly happens to Doomguy in the final level of the first episode, but the character survives. Later, when asked, Hall and Romero confirmed that Doomguy is a descendant of B.J. Blazkowicz, the protagonist of Id Software's other game series Wolfenstein.

== Characterization ==
Doomguy as he appears without his helmet in The Ultimate Doom

=== Doom and Doom II ===
The box art for the original Doom (1993), which was done by Don Ivan Punchatz, shows Doomguy firing a weapon (which does not make an appearance in the final game) at a horde of demons below him as one of them grabs his left wrist, while a fellow marine (similar battle dress uniform, except in grey) in the background is rushing to catch up. This image is also used in the introduction screen of Doom, in which Doomguy has a shotgun clutched in his left hand, while a Baron of Hell kills the grey-uniformed marine in the background. The Doomguy appears without a helmet in the ending to The Ultimate Doom episode IV "Thy Flesh Consumed", and again in the cover art of Doom II (1994) where he is fighting a Cyberdemon with a shotgun.

For the character's in-game sprite (seen at the ending of Doom II), Doomguy wears green armor and a light grey helmet that conceals his facial features. Several corpses of other marines are occasionally encountered, and they feature the same uniform. In multiplayer mode there is a palette swap applied; with players either green, indigo (gray), brown, and/or red, depending on player number.

For Doom, Doom II, and Final Doom (1996), Doomguy's face is seen in the game's HUD, where he is shown as a white male with blue eyes and light brown hair in a buzz cut. Doomguy’s face displays a stern glare, and his eyes constantly dart left and right. Upon the player taking damage, the face provides feedback with an angered reaction, and the tilt of his face indicates the direction he has been attacked from. As the player’s health drops, Doomguy’s face also becomes increasingly bloodied and disheveled. Doomguy grins upon picking up a new weapon, and the most emotional face is seen when the player suffers 20 hit points or more taken away during a single attack, whereupon the HUD is supposed to show a shocked face. However, this behavior is actually broken in the original versions of Doom, Doom II and Final Doom, as said expression only shows if the player heals 20 health during the period a large amount of damage was taken; several third-party Doom source ports have corrected this bug. In Doom 64 (1997), Doomguy has a slightly modified green armor with black highlights, a black helmet with an antenna, and a blue visor.

=== Doom 3 and Resurrection of Evil ===
In Doom 3 (2004), the Doomguy looks slightly different. He still wears green armor with exposed arms, but his facial features are not concealed, his muscular build is less exaggerated, and his hair is black. During the game, Doomguy can interact with several characters, most of whom, like Sergeant Kelly, give the player some briefing regarding his mission. The character remains silent throughout and is portrayed as tough and fearless in the game's cut scenes, generally only glaring at the demons he sees; when he discovers the towering Cyberdemon for the game's final battle, however, he steps back in fear and mouths a word.

The protagonist in Doom 3: Resurrection of Evil (2005) is a different character from the Doomguy in Doom 3, being an older-looking and somewhat more heavyset and weather-beaten combat engineer with a dark brush cut who wears pale blue armor. This character is also shown to take enjoyment out of using the demonic powers available in the game, as cutscenes show him grinning with glee upon discovering the Artifact.

=== Doom (2016), Eternal and Dark Ages ===
In Doom (2016), Doomguy is more characterized: Doomguy's title is now "The DOOM Slayer", he is never seen nor heard other than from the first person, and other than gameplay at the beginning of the game that shows him having a white skin color and the muscular masculine suit seen in the introduction, practically no details are revealed. The DOOM Slayer's eyes and nose can be made out through the visor of his helmet on the game's box art, the 3D model viewer, and his Quake Champions appearance. Although the DOOM Slayer is still silent, he has more personality as shown by his hand gestures, fist bumping a small Doomguy figurine, shaking his fist in rage before punching a monitor whilst looking at the corpse of a UAC worker, and making a backup of a friendly AI rather than erasing it.

Doom Eternal is more detailed about the Slayer's characterization relative to the previous game: Doomguy is seen without a helmet in first person perspective, and for the first time in the series' history, he also speaks, voiced in a flashback cutscene by Matthew Waterson. He is stated to be immortal, and he does not need to sleep, eat, drink or excrete. A room in his Fortress of Doom is filled with comic books, collectible figurines, and guitars. Some people consider that, "according to his computer log-in screen", his name is revealed to be Flynn Taggart, confirming the name the 1995 Doom novels assigned him. However, that is not a login screen but a password to open the original Doom II .wad from within Doom Eternal. Some question this logic, as of why would he put his own name as a password, while others consider this to be nothing more but an Easter egg. Among those, there are "Taggart" comic books spread about, as well as the book on the shelf, titled "RET-CONNED: The Life and Times of Flynn Taggart", which could, also, suggest that the developers retconned that name. Additionally, the expansion for Doom: The Dark Ages entitled Revelations contains flashback sequences where Doomguy is referred to as "Taggart" by a superior. Furthermore, codex entries found in game detailing a counterinsurgency and following court martial that led to Doomguy being sent to Phobos refer to him as "Flynn Taggart," confirming that Doomguy's name is Flynn Taggart.Doomguy also has access to alternate costumes, including a winged unicorn skin. Some speculate that he stands about 7 feet (210 cm) tall and weighs 500 pounds (230 kg) in armor; without it, 6 feet 8 inches (203 cm) with a weight of 360 pounds (160 kg), though it is uncertain where exactly these claims have originated from. A life-sized figure of the Slayer made by Studio Oxmox for Doom (2016) stands 205 cm (6 ft 9 in) tall. However, a substantial portion of this height is provided by the figure's base, making it unclear how tall the figure portrays the Doom Slayer himself as. Other figures suggest a more modest height of 6 feet in armor.

== Appearances ==
Doomguy appears as the lead of the original 1993 video game Doom, its sequel Doom II, and their spinoff Doom 64. Visually-different Doomguys appear in Doom 3 and its expansion pack Resurrection of Evil. As the Doom Slayer, he appears in the 2016 series reboot Doom, in its sequel Doom Eternal and in the prequel Doom: The Dark Ages.

Doomguy also appears in the mobile game Doom RPG, Doom II RPG and in 2016's Doom Pinball, the virtual pinball adaptation of that game developed by Zen Studios as one of the three tables of the Bethesda Pinball pack, an add-on for Zen Pinball 2 (2012), Pinball FX 2 (2010) and Pinball FX 3 (2017). He also appeared in Mighty Doom (2023) as the Mini Slayer, a toy-like version of the character.

=== Other appearances ===
- A space marine's corpse appears in a secret area in Duke Nukem 3D (1996); they are seen halfway through their Classic Doom death animation clutching their throat and gurgling, surrounded by various Satanic iconography. Upon seeing them, the protagonist Duke Nukem says, "That's one doomed space marine".
- Doomguy appears in the PC version of Tony Hawk's Pro Skater 3 (2001) as a secret cheat character.
- In the Sega Saturn version of Quake (1996), Doomguy briefly appears at the end of the bonus feature "Dank & Scuz". Doomguy also appears in Quake Champions. In Quake III Arena (1999), he appears in three levels under the name "Doom". The character "Phobos" is also a Doom space marine, though his skin is darker and his armor is orange rather than green. The third space marine in the game, a woman named "Crash", is mentioned as being Doom's training instructor before arriving at the Arena.
- A Doomguy costume was made available in Fall Guys: Ultimate Knockout, along with Cyberdemon and Cacodemon on January 12, 2021, for a limited time.
- Doom Slayer appears as a Mii Fighter Costume in Super Smash Bros. Ultimate (2018), which was released as downloadable content in October 2021.
- On December 4, 2022, the Doom Slayer appeared as an outfit alongside multiple other Doom themed cosmetics in the Fortnite Chapter 4, Season 1 battle pass.
- The Doom Slayer appears in Tony Hawk's Pro Skater 3 + 4, remakes of Pro Skater 3 and Pro Skater 4, similar to his appearance in the PC port of Pro Skater 3.
- The Doom Slayer appears as a playable Operator in Call of Duty: Black Ops 7 and Call of Duty: Warzone, as part of a limited-time event pass; the Slayer's appearance is based on The Dark Ages, as well as his classic Doomguy outfit.

=== Novels ===
In the 1990s Doom novels, Doomguy is referred to as Flynn "Fly" Taggart. However, that name was unpopular among some in the Doom community, including John Romero, who stated online in 2002 that he was "not too hot on Flynn Taggart like everyone else."

For the Doom 3 novels, a space marine with a similar role is named John Kane. His past is somewhat similar to that of Doomguy in the original Doom, having been demoted after disobeying the command to save some of his fellow Marines. During the Hell invasion, Kane is forced to take command of several of the surviving marines despite his stripped ranking. He battles the demons single-handedly, or with a few other marines. He is depicted as compassionate to his fellow survivors, working to save a child named Theo and to save the damned in Hell. After volunteering to enter Hell to retrieve the soul cube, Campbell, a bodyguard, is shown as very impressed by him. He and Maria, a private soldier, start to feel romantic ties to each other. At the end of Doom 3: Maelstrom, Kane's leg is blown off and he is admired as the "man who saved Mars City".

=== Film ===
Arnold Schwarzenegger, Vin Diesel and Dwayne Johnson were mooted for the role of the Marine in the 2005 film Doom, with Karl Urban ultimately cast in the role of John "Reaper" Grimm in September 2004. Urban underwent military training for two weeks under military advisor Tom McAdams. The film's first person shooter sequence, shot from Reaper's perspective, was completely directed by visual effects supervisor Jon Farhat and was filmed in 14 days after a planning period of three months. While the scene is one continuous shot, multiple cuts that Farhat called "hook-ups" were made during filming. Farhat stated: "You can do it by moving a camera, and passing something, and cutting. And then rolling the camera again on a subsequent date." Other hook-up styles were used by using a green screen or blue screen when a door opens or jump-cutting by whipping an object. Reaper's gun was only used on screen when it was needed due to its size affecting the aspect ratio.

For the 2019 film Doom: Annihilation director Tony Giglio created the character of the woman space marine Joan Dark after taking inspiration from The Terminator and Aliens, feeling that a female protagonist would be more effective in a sci-fi action film. Joan was named after Joan of Arc. Inspiration was drawn from Doomguy's depiction in the first three Doom games, as Universal did not retain the rights to the Bethesda version. Amy Manson and Agleya Gumnerova were then confirmed to have been cast in the role. Dark's depiction as a Doom protagonist received negative criticism from fans.

== Cultural impact ==
=== Reception ===
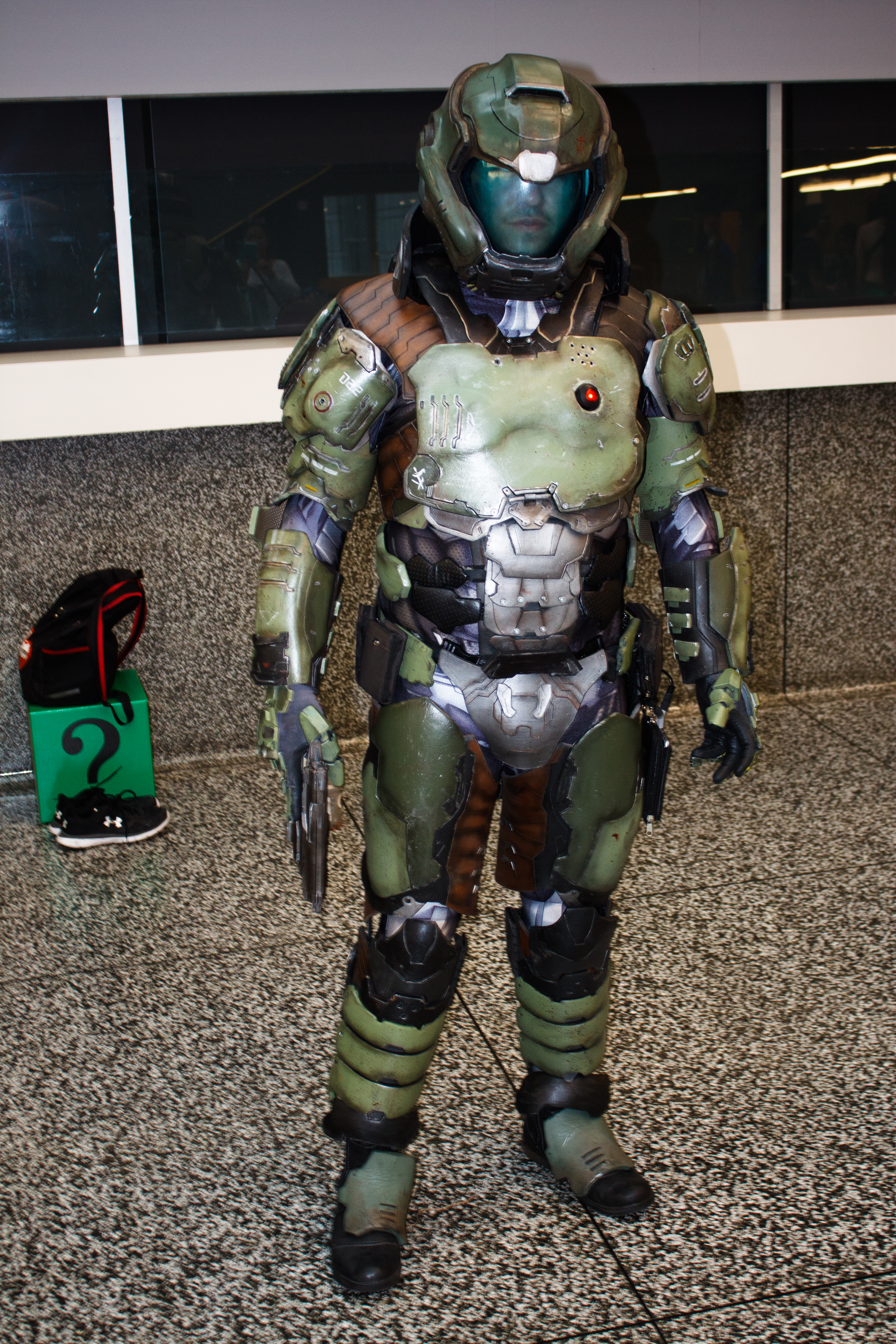
A cosplayer recreating the character's appearance from 2016's Doom

UGO Networks ranked Doomguy fourth on its 2012's list of best silent protagonists in video games, noting his courage to continue in silence even when faced with Hell's army. In 2013, Complex ranked Doomguy at number 16 on its list of the greatest soldiers in video games for being "the original video game space marine" and "one of the classic silent protagonists". Both CraveOnline and VGRC ranked him the fifth most "badass" male character in video game history. Kirk McKeand of VG247 described Doomguy as "Jesus with a super shotgun". David Houghton of GamesRadar claimed that Doomguy is the smartest player character around, even with fist bumps, violence and zero dialogue. In 2021, Rachel Weber of GamesRadar ranked him as the 47th most iconic video game character. In 2009, GameDaily included the Doom space marine on its list of "ten game heroes who fail at the simple stuff" for his inability to look up and down in the original series.

Doomguy's incarnation from the 2016 game has received special acclaim for its characterization and how the game presents the player character as a representation of the player playing Doom. writing for GamesRadar, David Houghton called the presentation "incidental, not explicit", which allows the players to immerse themself completely in the character. Christian Donlan writing for Eurogamer theorized that "the guy in Doom is playing Doom", and explained that the main character's impatience with exposition is analogous to "the temporary frustration of being inside Doom while not being able to play Doom". In his column Extra Punctuation Ben Croshaw wrote that the game "establishes the player character as someone who doesn't give a flake of dried Marmite for the larger context, and only cares about ridding the planet of demons. Which is hopefully representative of the player's motivation." Additional praise was given for the subtlety of Doomguy's expressions: James Stephanie Sterling noted that both the "glory kill" moves and additional pieces of animation "reinforce his consistent sense of irreverence", Sterling, along with a number of other reviewers including Houghton, Donlan, and Croshaw from Zero Punctuation noted the initial moment of the game with Doomguy throwing away a communications monitor while a mission briefing plays as a minimalistic, but effective way to convey the entire character's motivations.

Doomguy was a popular choice for inclusion in the roster of the crossover fighting game series Super Smash Bros. by fans, and also by multiple websites, including PC Gamer, GamingBolt, GameRevolution, and Shacknews staffs.

=== In popular culture ===
Doomguy has been the subject of extensive fan art. Images of the marine's face from classic Doom digitally-enhanced for realism have been popular among fans on social media platforms. On May 4, 2021, Bethesda featured Doomguy as part of a Star Wars Day tribute on its official Twitter account.

When Doom Eternal was delayed and released the same day as Animal Crossing: New Horizons, fans of both games began creating and sharing artwork depicting Isabelle and Doom Slayer together as friends, which eventually trended on social media in 2020. Commentators responded positively towards the fan-made pairing, including acknowledgments from Aya Kyogoku, director of New Horizons, as well as Bethesda. Because of this pairing, when Doom Slayer was added as a Mii Fighter costume in Super Smash Bros. Ultimate in October 2021, together with Isabelle on the roster, the final update of the game was dubbed "friendship" and "love story" by video game publications, and the official Doom Twitter account posted an in-game image of the two characters with the caption "together at last". The Doom Slayer and Isabelle friendship pairing has also been subject to other forms of fan labor, like a fan video and cosplay.

John Romero titled his autobiography Doom Guy: Life in First Person.

=== Promotion and merchandise ===
In September 2020, Limited Run Games offered a Doomguy Helmet Collector's Bundle, which includes a wearable "full-size" helmet, a recreation of the game's original floppy disk pin, and a limited edition print. McFarlane Toys released two Doomguy Figurines. In 2020, subscribers to Twitch Prime were entitled to an 1980s style blonde mullet themed Doom Eternal skin for Doomguy. In April 2021, the Xbox brand released a series of portraits featuring Doomguy and Master Chief to commemorate Microsoft's acquisition of Bethesda Softworks' parent company ZeniMax Media. In 2023, Dark Horse and Mondo paired up to release a 12-Inch action figure of The DOOM Slayer.

== See also ==
- Isaac Clarke
- Gordon Freeman
- Master Chief (Halo)
- Samus Aran
