= Doom Resurrection =

2009 video game

- App icon
- Developer: Escalation Studios
- Publisher: id Software
- Directors: Tom Mustaine; John Carmack
- Producer: Katherine Anna Kang
- Programmers: John Faulkenbury, Shawn C. Green, Josh Martel
- Artist: Robert Hutson
- Series: Doom
- Platform: iOS
- Release: WW: June 26, 2009
- Genre: Rail shooter
- Mode: Single-player

Doom Resurrection is a first-person shooter game developed by Escalation Studios and published by id Software. It was released on 26 June 2009. John Carmack led the development team. The setting for Doom Resurrection is parallel to Doom 3, and it uses the characters and art of the previously developed game.

== Plot ==
The game stars an unnamed marine, a survivor of Bravo Team after a demonic invasion of Mars. He awakens, and is soon confronted by Dr. Garret, who presents him Sam, a flying droid capable of opening doors and hacking computers. Together with Sam, the survivor makes his way through the Mars facility, battling zombies and demons on his way through the base. The task is to reach a port, where a spaceship full of surviving members of the UAC facility is preparing to launch off. On his way, the marine meets more survivors, collects valuable information through Sam, and visits Hell, where he closes the demon-spawning portals. Eventually, the marine is forced to leave Dr. Garret behind, and Sam sacrifices itself to support a closing door to the spaceship, leaving only the data implicating UAC. The marine successfully boards the ship and leaves Mars with a few other survivors.

== Development ==
id Software billed Resurrection as the first AAA iPhone title; a claim that was met with some doubt by journalists. The game was built using assets from Doom 3. As an early iPhone game there was some iteration during development to figure out how to control and aim on a touchscreen. The team settled on accelerometer based aiming, which they believed would be copied by other developers after the launch. This helped avoid problems with players' fingers being in the way of the action.

== Reception ==
Reception

Review scores
Publication	Score
Edge	5/10
IGN	8/10

The game received a mixed reception at the time. While some publications were positive about the action experience, others pointed to the price point- $9.99, a high price for an iPhone title, and the inevitable poor comparison against the more fully fleshed core titles in the series.

Looking back in retrospect, the game is regarded in a much more negative light. When RollingStone ranked each Doom game by quality in 2025, they placed Resurrection at 11th place out of 12 titles, placing it only ahead of Mighty Doom. A similar list the same year from The Gamer placed it at 13th of 13 games, adding that it "takes what was one of the weakest entries in the mainline series and strips out everything that was even potentially fun about it."
