= Doom RPG =

2005 video game

- Developer: Fountainhead Entertainment
- Publisher: JAMDAT Mobile
- Director: John Carmack
- Producers: John Carmack, Katherine Anna Kang
- Designers: Matthew C. Ross, David Whitlark
- Programmers: John Carmack, Jah Raphael, Brett Estabrook, Heath Morrison
- Series: Doom
- Platforms: BREW, Java ME
- Release: September 19, 2005
- Genres: Role playing, first-person shooter
- Mode: Single player

Doom RPG is a 2005 role-playing video game developed by Fountainhead Entertainment and published by JAMDAT Mobile for mobile phones. It combines the Doom first-person shooter franchise with role-playing elements. The storyline incorporates many similar events of Doom 3, but involves different characters than those in the third game.

The website for Doom RPG states that the protagonist in Doom RPG is the same character from Doom, Doom II, and Doom 3.

== Gameplay ==
The game retains many of the elements of Doom, and is shown in the first person like the original. It is also visually similar to the original Doom. However, the game is fundamentally different in that it is a turn-based role-playing game, rather than a shooter, with greater emphasis on the plot. Combat and movement are turn-based, allowing the player time to select their responses in combat. The player turns at 90 degree angles and moves space by space. It is very important to speak to the scientists and access computer terminals to attain vital information in order to progress through the game, similar to Doom 3.

Many features of the original are retained, including the status bar face, sound effects and the majority of the weapons and monsters. Notably absent are the Chainsaw, Arachnotrons and Spider Mastermind. A difference from the original is that each monster is one of three levels of difficulty, and is colored to indicate this.

The game also adds several new elements. New weapons include the fire axe and fire extinguisher which are useful in combat against certain enemies. The dogs from Wolfenstein 3D appear as a new enemy, known as Hellhounds. A dog collar-styled mind-control device allows the hellhounds to be captured as pets, which can then act as both a melee weapon and a shield.

== Plot ==
The story occurs on a Martian Union Aerospace Corporation installation similar to Doom 3. The player is addressed to by NPCs in the game as Marine.

The game is divided into section based on Sectors in the base. The sectors are Entrance, Junction, Sector 1 through Sector 7, and Reactor. The Junction is the staging area or main town for the game.

Guerard was not on good terms with Jensen. Three weeks prior to the start of the game, Guerard asked Graff to perform a security audit on Jensen. Jensen failed the security audit and was dismissed for this security breach. Jensen suspected that Guerard was involved in his dismissal. During the same time, demons started to invade the installation, appearing out of nowhere. It is around this time that the game begins.

Early on in the game, the Marine meets Dr. Jensen when he was accessing a computer terminal investigating his dismissal. During the exploration of first few sectors of the installation, the Marine receives help from Dr. Guerard in gaining access to various locked down areas. In Biological Research Facility, the Marine meets Dr. Nadira who quarantines his weapons claiming security measures. Dr. Nadira then commands his mind-controlled hellhounds to attack the Marine and disappears in the process. Eventually, Marine meets Jensen again. This time he is incarcerated in a prison cell. After freeing Jensen, he informs the Marine that Guerard and Nadira are into an evil scheme and directs the Marine to the next section of the installation.

The next time the Marine meets Guerard and Nadira, it is known that Guerard was behind the invasion and has been attempting to open a portal to Hell in the Reactor Sector. Guerard promptly orders demons to attack the Marine and Nadira. Nadira dies and Guerard escapes. The Marine proceeds through the remaining two sectors, acquiring the BFG 9000 and the key to the Reactor sector. By then, a major invasion devastates the Junction. With the help of Kelvin and Jensen, the Marine gains access to the Reactor sector. Kelvin and Jensen both die in the process.

In the Reactor sector, Guerard reveals himself as Kronos and transforms into demonic form. By this time, he has succeeded in opening the portal to Hell. After defeating Kronos, the Marine closes the portal by destroying the reactors powering it. The Cyberdemon slips through before the portal closes. The game ends with the defeat of the Cyberdemon. The Cyberdemon is likely to be Kronos' creation referred to by other NPCs.

== Development ==
The game's engine was later used for another Fountainhead Entertainment title, Orcs & Elves, Orcs & Elves II, and was also followed by Wolfenstein RPG and Doom II RPG.

== Supported platforms ==
The game was released for three platforms:

- Java
- Low-end BREW
- High-end BREW

Symbian OS never received a dedicated port of game.

A fan version was released for PC and for the Amiga.

== Reception ==
The game received some awards including "2005 Mobile Game of the Year", "2005 Adventure/RPG of the Year", "Editor's Award", "Game of the Year", "Editor's Choice Award" and "Best Wireless Adventure Game". GameSpot gave Doom RPG a score of 8.6 out of a possible 10 in their review of the game.

The game sold more than 1 million copies.
