= Katherine Anna Kang =

American film producer and video game designer

- Born: December 15, 1970 (age 55)
- Occupations: Founder and CEO of Fountainhead Entertainment
- Spouse: John D. Carmack (m. 2000; div. 2021)
- Children: 2

Katherine Anna Kang (born December 15, 1970) is an American business woman and video game designer. She is best known in gaming circles as the ex-wife of programmer John Carmack (co-creator of Doom, Quake, etc.). They met at QuakeCon in 1997, married in January 2000, and had two sons together (one born in 2004, another in 2009). The couple divorced in 2021.

== Career ==
Kang served as Director of Business Development at id Software primarily from late 1997 to early 2000, where she worked on Quake III Arena and various mission packs and Quake II ports.

In 2000, Kang wrote, directed, and produced the documentary Gamers. The documentary included interviews from video gaming luminaries, with a brief focus on history and predictive trends. The documentary was released in limited distribution throughout Europe and the US in 2001.

In 2000, as founder and CEO of Fountainhead Entertainment, she championed machinima and became known as one of machinima's biggest supporters. Through Fountainhead Entertainment, she produced, wrote, and directed a variety of machinima pieces and co-founded the Academy of Machinima Arts & Sciences. In Machinima For Dummies, the machinima piece Anna is mentioned as "…one of the top ten list of every prominent machinima maker in the world."

Fountainhead Entertainment was renamed id Mobile and continued to be led by Kang. Kang produced and designed mobile games for id Software. Mobile game titles Doom RPG and the Orcs & Elves series were heralded as some of the best mobile games of their time. Orcs & Elves was eventually ported to the Nintendo DS with Kang producing and designing. As president of id Mobile, where she produced and designed Wolfenstein RPG and Doom II RPG. She also produced the iPhone-only game Doom Resurrection.

Kang is also co-founder of Armadillo Aerospace.

== Personal life ==
Kang was born in Brazil to Korean parents.

Kang married computer programmer and businessman John Carmack in January 2000. In August 2004, Kang gave birth to their first son, Christopher Ryan. Their second son was born in November 2009. The couple divorced in 2021.

== Awards ==
Through Fountainhead Entertainment, Kang has won the following awards:

- AMAS Best Technical Achievement for Anna
- AMAS Best Direction for In The Waiting Line
- IGN.com Adventure Game of the Year for Doom RPG
- 1UP.com Mobile Game of the Year for Doom RPG
- GameSpot's Mobies Mobile Game of the Year for Doom RPG
- Academy of Interactive Arts and Sciences Best Cell Game for Orcs & Elves
- IGN.com Best of E3 – Best Wireless RPG for Orcs & Elves
- IGN.com Best Wireless Story for Orcs & Elves
- Leipzig Game Convention Best Mobile Game for Orcs & Elves

== Machinima ==
Fountainhead's machinima include the award-winning short Anna; In The Waiting Line, aired on MTV; Game Over, aired on UPN; and Sidrial released via Fileplanet.

== Games ==
- Quake II (1997), for Microsoft Windows, Linux, Mac OS X, developed by id Software, published by Activision
- Kingpin: Life of Crime (1999), for Microsoft Windows, Linux Interplay Entertainment Corp
- Quake III Arena (1999), for Microsoft Windows, Linux, Mac OS X, developed by id Software and published by Activision
- Doom RPG (2005), developed by id Software, published by JAMDAT
- Orcs & Elves (2006), for mobile phone, developed by id Software, published by EA
- Orcs & Elves (2007), for Nintendo DS, developed by id Software, published by EA Mobile
- Orcs & Elves 2 (2007), developed by id Software, published by EA Mobile
- Wolfenstein RPG (2008), for mobile phone, by id Software, published by EA Mobile
- Doom Resurrection (2009), for iOS, developed by id Software
- Doom 2 RPG (2010), for mobile phone, by id Software
