= Doom 3: Resurrection of Evil =

2005 video game

- Box art featuring Maledict, the titular antagonist of the game
- Developer: Nerve Software
- Publisher: Activision
- Designers: David Kelvin; Adam Bellefeuil; Patrick Hook; Brandon James
- Programmers: Brian Matt; Darin McNeil; Sean Mitchell
- Artists: Ted Anderson; Jake Hernandez; Pat Jones
- Series: Doom
- Engine: id Tech 4
- Platforms: Windows; Linux; Xbox
- Release: Windows: WW: April 4, 2005; Linux: WW: May 24, 2005; Xbox: NA: October 5, 2005; EU: October 21, 2005
- Genres: First-person shooter, survival horror
- Modes: Single-player, multiplayer

Doom 3: Resurrection of Evil is a 2005 first-person shooter game developed by Nerve Software and published by Activision. An expansion pack and sequel to Doom 3, it was released for Microsoft Windows on April 4, 2005, and for Xbox on October 5, 2005. The Xbox version does not require the original Doom 3 in order to play and includes The Ultimate Doom, Doom II: Hell on Earth and Master Levels for Doom II. A remastered version of Resurrection of Evil was included with Doom 3: BFG Edition.

The game features eight multiplayer game modes. It features twelve new single-player levels, six new enemies including the Hunter, four new multiplayer maps, and new weapons such as the double-barreled shotgun originating from Doom II.

Online multiplayer was available until the termination of Xbox Live on April 15, 2010. Resurrection of Evil is playable online again on the replacement online servers for the Xbox called Insignia.

== Gameplay ==
Resurrection of Evil adds two new main features to the gameplay that the player can use throughout the game. The first is a tool that was originally developed for Doom 3: the "Grabber". Like the "Gravity Gun" from Half-Life 2, the Grabber is a physics-based weapon that allows the player to pick up and move certain items. It also allows the player to catch fireballs and throw them back at the enemy. Resurrection of Evil has come under some criticism about the use of the Grabber due to the prior popularity of the similar weapon in Half-Life 2. The developers have commented that the tool was originally in Doom 3 before Half-Life 2, and was used to create "damaged" rooms; instead of building a ruined room, they would build a pristine room and use the grabber to "damage" it realistically.

There are three major differences between the Grabber and the Gravity Gun. The first is that the Grabber has a limited charge, and thus can only hold onto an object for several seconds. The second is that the Grabber creates a distortion effect that can obscure the player's vision when in use. The third, and by far most important in terms of its impact on gameplay, is that the Grabber can catch and throw projectiles and small creatures, whereas the Gravity Gun cannot. This makes it the best weapon for defeating several types of monsters, including the Lost Soul, Cherub, and Trite, which it can throw and kill outright, and the Imp, Cacodemon, Hell Knight, and Vulgar, whose projectiles it can catch and throw back. It cannot catch Revenant missiles, but it can deflect them.

The second additional feature is the "Artifact". The Artifact has three abilities, each of which becomes available after defeating one of the expansion's first three boss monsters. The most frequently commented on is "hell time", an effect that changes the player's perception to be one of slow-motion, except for the player's own movements. This effect is notable, as something similar was originally introduced as the key new gameplay element of Max Payne, and later used in the 2005 game F.E.A.R.

The Xbox version adds an exclusive new feature to the gameplay: the flashlight is now attached directly to a weapon. In the PC version of Resurrection of Evil, as well as Doom 3, players cannot wield a flashlight and a weapon at the same time, forcing them to switch constantly between the two. Many players had asked for such a feature to be implemented after the original game's release, and various mods were released to fulfill this. However, in the Xbox version, the flashlight is mounted onto the pistol – the game's weakest firearm – and cannot be mounted onto more powerful weapons.

Another addition is the double-barreled shotgun. It uses the same ammunition as the regular shotgun but fires two shells at once, offering much greater stopping power and killing most enemies with one shot. The downside is that with every shot, the weapon must be reloaded in order to be used again. It thus resembles the double-barreled "Super Shotgun" from Doom II: Hell on Earth.

The ammo capacities for the weapons are also increased (e.g. the Plasma Gun's ammo capacity increased from 450 to 500 rounds). There are three new mini-games on usable arcade cabinets throughout the game, as opposed to the single game of "Super Turbo Turkey Puncher 3" found in the original. "Sarge's Big Game Hunt" is an artillery game, Hellanoid is an Arkanoid clone, and "Martian Buddy Blaster" is a shooter game.

There are also four new monsters, not counting boss creatures. The first new monster (also the first monster seen in the game) is the Forgotten One, a Lost Soul variant. It more closely resembles the Lost Souls from the original games, being a blazing horned skull without any cybernetic parts. The second addition is the Vulgar. It is closely related to the Imp, and behaves almost exactly like one. The model used for the Vulgar was the original Archvile model seen in early Doom 3 scans. The third new addition is the Bruiser. At about the same size as a Hell Knight, it has a computer monitor mounted on its face that flashes one of several images on-screen, including an eye when it sees the player and a set of flashing, sharp-toothed jaws. The fourth is the Bio-Suit Zombie, encountered only in a single brief run through a sewage tunnel.

== Synopsis ==
In 2147, two years after the events of Doom 3, the UAC detects a strange signal from one of its Martian satellites, and consequently sends a team in to investigate. After this, the team finds an Artifact and the forces of Hell are alerted and begin a new invasion. The player, a marine combat engineer who discovers the hellish device, must fight his way through the base to reach the doctor, chased by demons. McNeil, an unseen character in Doom 3, was the whistleblower who notified counselor Elliot Swann and Jack Campbell of Malcolm Betruger's mysterious activities at the beginning of Doom 3.

The marine eventually finds her, and she tasks him with stopping the invasion by returning the Artifact to Hell. In his journeys, he defeats the three Hell Hunters (demons who were supposed to find the Artifact) and absorbs their powers into the ancient device.

The marine arrives in Hell and battles his way to Betruger, who has become the dragon-like Maledict. After some fighting, Betruger bites the marine, but before he can eat him, the marine shoves the Artifact down Betruger's throat, causing him to dematerialize. Only his skull remains. The game ends with a bright white light, followed by McNeil's voice saying, "Marine?... Welcome home."

== Development ==
The development of Resurrection of Evil was announced by id Software in October 2004. While Doom 3 was developed by id Software, Resurrection of Evil was developed by Nerve Software. Activision would remain the publisher.

== Reception ==
Reception

Aggregate scores
Aggregator	Score
GameRankings	PC: 80% XBOX: 78%
Metacritic	PC: 78/100; XBOX: 77/100

Resurrection of Evil garnered mostly favorable reviews; the Windows version holds a score of 78/100 on the review aggregator site Metacritic, while the Xbox version is rated at 77/100.
