= Rage: Mutant Bash TV =

2010 video game

- Developer: id Software
- Publisher: Bethesda Softworks
- Engine: id Tech 5
- Platform: iOS
- Release: WW: November 18, 2010
- Genres: First-person shooter, rail shooter
- Mode: Single-player

Rage: Mutant Bash TV is a 2010 first-person rail shooter video game developed by id Software and published by Bethesda Softworks. It serves as a tie-in to the game of the same name that was later released in October 2011.

== Development ==
In his keynote speech at QuakeCon 2010 on August 12, 2010, Carmack announced that id was developing a Rage-related game for Apple's iOS. He later described the mobile Rage as a "little slice of Rage ... [about] Mutant Bash TV, a post-apocalyptic combat game show in the Rage wasteland", and separately hinted that he might try to port Rage Mobile to Android, although he later stated no id games would be coming to Android due to lack of financial viability.

== Reception ==
Reception

Aggregate score
Aggregator	Score
Metacritic	70/100

Review scores
Publication	Score
Destructoid	6.5/10
Eurogamer	6/10
IGN	7.5/10

Rage: Mutant Bash TV received average reviews, according to the aggregate review site Metacritic.
