= Mighty Doom =

2023 video game

- Key visual art by Anastasia Cook
- Developer: Alpha Dog Games
- Publisher: Bethesda Softworks
- Artist: Anastasia Cook
- Composer: Joshua Richardson
- Series: Doom
- Platforms: Android, iOS
- Release: 21 March 2023
- Genres: Roguelite, shoot 'em up
- Mode: Single-player

Mighty Doom was a roguelite shoot 'em-up video game developed by Alpha Dog Games and published by Bethesda Softworks in 2023. It was released as part of the Doom franchise and focused on playing the Mini Slayer character, a toy-like version of Doomguy, to progress through various levels in a roguelite play style. Players navigated through levels filled with enemies and environmental challenges, earning temporary upgrades to enhance combat. Several enemy designs from the Doom franchise were adapted to a toy-like art style and players could use the glory kill system to generate health pick-ups.

Developed by Alpha Dog Games for Android and iOS, Mighty Doom featured a colorful, cartoonish design that contrasted with the dark aesthetic of the canonical Doom series. The game was initially soft-launched in 2021 for Android. Pre-registration for the game opened in February 2023, accompanied by an announcement trailer that introduced the Mini Slayer in a stylized, animated version of the Doom universe.

Mighty Doom was officially released worldwide on 21 March 2023. The game received mixed reviews from critics, who praised its art direction, roguelite elements, and soundtrack, but criticized its lack of originality and its intrusive implementation of microtransactions. In 2024, Mighty Doom was shut down following the closure of Alpha Dog Games.

== Gameplay ==
In Mighty Doom, players progressed through levels split into stages, with some featuring boss fights.

Mighty Doom was a single-player top-down shooter video game that featured roguelite mechanics. The premise of the story revolved around demons who had taken away the protagonist's pet rabbit, Daisy. The game's protagonist, known as the Mini Slayer, is a toy-like version of Doomguy, the central character of the Doom franchise. He could be moved around using an onscreen joystick, while shooting was done automatically. Along with a primary weapon, the Mini Slayer had access to special weapons that could be activated manually. An energy meter with a limited capacity, a common aspect of mobile games, was utilized in the game.

The player had to progress through multiple levels and stages, each of which presented varying challenges in the form of monsters and environmental hazards. While starting each level with only basic equipment, the player could earn temporary upgrades to enhance combat performance, thanks to the game's roguelite features. Several enemy designs from the Doom franchise were featured in a toy-like art style. Players were also able to utilize the glory kill system from the latest mainline Doom titles, which allowed them to finish off dazed demons to generate health pick-ups. The game also offered gamepad support, allowing players to utilize controllers via Bluetooth connection.

== Development and release ==
Mighty Doom was developed for Android and iOS platforms by Alpha Dog Games. While the canonical entries in the Doom series are characterized by a dark and gritty aesthetic, Mighty Doom took a different artistic direction. Instead, the game focused on a colorful and cartoonish design. The game was initially soft-launched in 2021, offering early access exclusively on Android devices. In 2021, Pocket Gamer listed it as one of their 22 most anticipated mobile games.

Pre-registration became available in February 2023, offering players special gifts such as weapon skins and a Mini Slayer pack. The pre-registration phase was accompanied by the release of an announcement trailer, which introduced the Mini Slayer character in a stylized, animated presentation. The trailer depicted a toy-inspired version of the Doom universe, set within an alternate reality and crafted to deliver fast-paced, arcade-style action for mobile platforms. On 21 March 2023, the game was officially released worldwide.

On 7 May 2024, it was announced that Bethesda Softworks would be closing Alpha Dog Games, the developer of Mighty Doom, along with several other studios to cut operational costs. As a result, all development on Mighty Doom was halted, and the game was shut down on 7 August 2024. In-app purchases were disabled and refundable, and the app is no longer available for download to new players.

== Reception ==
Reception

Aggregate score
Aggregator	Score
Metacritic	(iOS) 56/100

Review scores
Publication	Score
IGN	5/10
PCMag	60/100

=== Critical response ===
According to review aggregator Metacritic, Mighty Doom received "mixed or average" reviews, based on 7 reviews for iOS. Pocket Gamer nominated the game as Best Mobile Action Game of 2023. By 7 May 2024, it had generated an estimated $10.5 million in global player spending across the App Store and Google Play and had been downloaded 7.6 million times.

Critics had mixed views on Mighty Doom's gameplay, praising its fast-paced combat but noting a lack of originality. According to PCMag, the core gameplay was competent but generic, falling short of the excitement the franchise was known for. However, mechanics like the Glory Kill system and a stacking weapon upgrade system encouraged aggressive, over-the-top action that felt true to Doom. IGN similarly noted that the roguelite progression, where players collected temporary upgrades mid-run, made the gameplay experience thrilling and empowering. While Multiplayer.it found the initial challenge too light, they ultimately commended the game for effectively adapting Doom to a mobile format, calling it fun and full of franchise references despite its lack of innovation.

Mighty Doom's monetization model received mostly negative reviews from critics, who said it significantly diminished the experience by turning progression into a grind or paywall. PCMag noted the game's free-to-play tactics were slow and designed to encourage spending, with upgrades coming quickly but progression stalling later on. IGN was more critical, describing the game as "a monetized nightmare" filled with pay-to-win mechanics, unfair difficulty spikes, and manipulative currencies that drained the fun from the game. Multiplayer.it, however, argued that microtransactions were optional and the game was fully playable without spending money—though they acknowledged the difficulty spike and suggested purchases could be a way to reward the developers.

The game received praise for successfully blending the franchise's trademark violence with a charming, cartoonish aesthetic. PCMag highlighted the amusing contrast between the "chibi" visuals and the brutal action, noting the satisfaction of watching a tiny Doomguy wield his chainsaw. IGN echoed this sentiment, calling the Mini Slayer and his enemies both adorable and hilariously brutal. Multiplayer.it commended the developers for striking a surprising balance between humor and gore, even if some animations fell short, ultimately recognizing it as a faithful and entertaining adaptation of the Doom universe in a stylized, cuter take.

The heavy-metal soundtrack in Mighty Doom received positive reviews from critics for enhancing the intensity of the gameplay experience. IGN highlighted the soundtrack's similarity to recent Doom games, noting how it enhanced the action with its intense rhythm and the announcer's dramatic delivery of upgrades. Multiplayer.it also appreciated the metal soundtrack, describing it as engaging and rhythmically fitting, complementing both the action and the sound effects, with the narrator's voice further elevating key moments.
