= Doom Eternal =

2020 video game

- Developer: id Software (Note: Panic Button developed the Nintendo Switch version of the game.)
- Publisher: Bethesda Softworks
- Director: Hugo Martin
- Producer: Timothy Bell
- Programmer: Evan Eubanks
- Artist: Tony Garza
- Writers: Hugo Martin; Adam Gascoine; Jon Lane; Chad Mossholder
- Composer: Mick Gordon (Note: The music for The Ancient Gods DLC was composed by Andrew Hulshult and David Levy.)
- Series: Doom
- Engine: id Tech 7
- Platforms: PlayStation 4; Stadia; Windows; Xbox One; Nintendo Switch; PlayStation 5; Xbox Series X/S
- Release: March 20, 2020: PS4, Stadia, Win, Xbox One; March 20, 2020; Nintendo Switch; December 8, 2020; PS5, Xbox Series X/S; June 29, 2021
- Genre: First-person shooter
- Modes: Single-player, multiplayer

Doom Eternal is a 2020 first-person shooter game developed by id Software and published by Bethesda Softworks. It is the sequel to Doom (2016), and the seventh game in the Doom series. The story follows the Doom Slayer once again, on a mission to end Hell's consumption of Earth and foil the alien Maykrs' plans to exterminate humanity. Doom Eternal introduces several new weapons and enemy types, and has a large focus on resource management in which players can gain the Slayer's ammo, armor and health by executing enemies in close range. Along with the single-player campaign, a multiplayer mode, Battlemode, was introduced. In this mode, players can either play as the Doom Slayer or as a demon, and fight until either the Doom Slayer defeats the demons, or vice versa.

Early production of the game began in 2017. A core development goal for Eternal was to address the shortcomings of the 2016 game, introduce more visual diversity and add more gameplay variety. Platforming segments, in particular, were introduced to break up the game's pacing and make the non-combat scenarios more engaging. The team described the game to a "fantasy combat puzzle", as players must choose the best tools to exploit specific enemy weaknesses. Unlike its predecessor, id Software developed the multiplayer component in-house to connect it to the single-player campaign. Mick Gordon composed the soundtracks, however he had a conflict with id Software that led to both parties severing their relationship. Announced during E3 2018, Doom Eternal was released for PlayStation 4, Stadia, Windows, and Xbox One in March 2020, with a port for Nintendo Switch released in December 2020, and versions for PlayStation 5 and Xbox Series X/S released in June 2021.

Doom Eternal received positive reviews from critics, who praised its campaign, graphics, level design, soundtrack, and combat mechanics, though some disliked the increased focus on storytelling and its platforming sections. It was a commercial success, generating the highest opening weekend sales for the franchise to date. The Ancient Gods, a two-part standalone campaign DLC set after the events of the main game, was released between October 2020 and March 2021. Doom Eternal received five nominations at The Game Awards 2020, including Game of the Year and Best Action Game, as well as a nomination for Action Game of the Year at the 24th Annual D.I.C.E. Awards. A prequel, Doom: The Dark Ages, was released in 2025.

== Gameplay ==
Doom Eternal's platforming challenges can be completed using the Slayer's double jumping and dashing abilities.

Doom Eternal is a first-person shooter, in which players control the Doom Slayer, who must battle the demonic forces of Hell. Like its predecessor, combat is fast-paced, requiring players to always stay on the move. The Slayer is equipped with a large variety of weapons, as well as throwables such as grenades and ice bombs. The Super Shotgun is equipped with a grappling hook, that grabs onto enemies and slingshots player towards them. Some weapons in the game have secondary fire modes that alter their functions. As players progress, they will earn points to upgrade their weapons. Each weapon modification has a mastery skill that can be earned through completing a specific gameplay challenge. Additionally, the developers included the option to have a centered weapon view, which was traditional in the first two Doom games and was added as a post-release update to Doom 2016. Players can find pickup items which can give them special buffs, such as granting them extra lives or a "berserker" mode, that will kill every demon in a single hit, with the exception of bosses. If the player dies repeatedly in the same combat encounter, they can select the option to respawn with Sentinel Armor, which significantly reduces incoming damage. The game offers five difficulty levels for players to choose from. At higher difficulty levels, enemies attack player character more aggressively and deal significantly more damage. In "Ultra-Nightmare" and "Extra Lives" modes, the Slayer dies permanently when their lives run out, forcing players to restart the campaign.

Players need to manage the Slayer's health, armor, and the ammo of his weapons. To restore health, players must first stagger an enemy, and then perform a quick and violent "Glory Kill" execution. Igniting enemies using a flamethrower will refill armor, while using a chainsaw against them will cause them to drop various types of ammo, though ammo and charges for the game's most powerful weapons (the BFG and the Crucible Blade) can only be picked up at combat arenas. Accumulating Glory Kills recharge "Blood Punch", a powerful melee attack that destroys enemies' armor. A new system called "Destructible Demons" is featured, in which enemies' bodies progressively deteriorate as they take damage. It also enables players to exploit an enemy's weaknesses, stripping away their primary attack abilities. The Slayer is very agile and is capable of double-jumping, climbing on walls, and utilizing an omnidirectional dash to evade enemies. In combat arenas, he can make use of swing bars, portals, and jump pads to reach distant areas.

Doom Eternal has 13 missions. Progression in each mission is measured by a meter which indicates the number of combat encounters remaining in the stage. In addition to standard enemy encounters and boss fights, some levels may have optional "secret encounters" and "Slayer Gates", which are harder combat challenges. As players explore each level, they will find more upgrades such as Runes, Sentinel Crystals, and Preator Suit points. They modify the Slayer's abilities, provide additional gameplay bonuses, and increase his maximum health, armour and the total ammunition he can carry. Players may also find a large number of collectibles, such as albums, toys, and cheat codes, which provide players with additional perks and gameplay modifiers when they replay missions. The hub area, called "Fortress of Doom" contains rooms with further upgrades and gear which can be unlocked with Sentinel Batteries collected in the game's levels. Players can also access "Master levels", which remix the campaign missions with a different set of enemies.

In addition to the campaign, the game features an asymmetrical multiplayer mode named "Battlemode". In this mode, one player controlling the Doom Slayer must fight against two player-controlled demons. At launch, it features five playable demons. While each playable demon possesses unique skills and abilities, they share common offensive and defensive maneuvers, such as increasing their movement speed and creating hazardous zones for the Slayer. They can also summon two types of AI-controlled allies to assist in combat, though the Slayer can also utilize them to replenish his health and ammo. If a player-controlled demon is defeated, their partner must survive for 20 seconds to trigger a respawn; otherwise, the round ends. Each match has three rounds, and players can pick an upgrade after each round. Doom Eternal also features a horde mode consisting of three types of rounds; in Arena, players must defeat waves of increasingly difficult enemies, starting with only one weapon and unlocking a random one as they progress through each round; in Blitz, players must kill as many enemies as possible within a limited timeframe; and in Traversal, players must complete platforming challenges while collecting as many coins as possible.

== Plot ==
=== Main campaign ===
In 2163, fourteen years after the events on Mars, (Note: As depicted in Doom (2016)) Earth has been overrun by demons, wiping out 60% of the planet's population. The Union Aerospace Corporation (UAC) has been fully corrupted into a demonic cult. What remains of humanity has either fled Earth or joined the Armored Response Coalition (ARC) resistance movement. The Doom Slayer, having previously been betrayed by Dr. Samuel Hayden, returns with a satellite fortress controlled by the AI VEGA to quell the demonic invasion by killing the Hell Priests: Deags Nilox, Ranak, and Grav. The priests serve an angelic being known as the Khan Maykr, who seeks to sacrifice mankind for her own race's survival. The Slayer teleports to Earth and kills Deag Nilox, but the Khan Maykr transports the two remaining priests to unknown locations.

The Slayer retrieves a celestial locator from the Sentinel city of Exultia, and then travels to Hell to acquire a power source from the exiled Sentinel, the Betrayer. The Betrayer also gives him a dagger to stab the heart of his son, whose body was turned into the apocalyptic demon, the Icon of Sin. The Slayer finds and kills Deag Ranak at his citadel in the Arctic. In response, the Khan Maykr moves Deag Grav again and accelerates the invasion of Earth. With no leads on the last Hell Priest, VEGA suggests finding Dr. Hayden, who knows his location. At an ARC compound, the Slayer retrieves Hayden's damaged robot chassis and the demonic Crucible.

Upon uploading Hayden's mind into the fortress, he reveals Deag Grav is hiding on Sentinel Prime; the only way to get there is a portal located in the lost city of Hebeth in Mars' core. The Slayer travels to the Martian moon Phobos, where he uses the BFG 10000 to shoot a hole in the surface of Mars to reach Hebeth. After reaching Sentinel Prime, flashbacks reveal the Slayer to be the original Doomguy. Found badly wounded by Sentinels sometime after Doom 64, Doomguy was brought before the Deags and forced to fight in a gladiatorial arena. Impressed by Doomguy's ruthlessness in battle, the Deags inducted him into the Sentinels.

In the present, the Slayer finds and kills Deag Grav in the arena. The Khan Maykr reveals to the Slayer her plan to resurrect the Icon of Sin to consume mankind. The Slayer travels to the Sentinel homeworld of Argent D'Nur for his own Crucible. Further flashbacks reveal that during the battle of Argent D'Nur, a rogue Maykr called the Seraphim imbued Doomguy with superhuman abilities by putting him in the Divinity Machine, transforming him into the Doom Slayer. It is revealed that the Khan Maykr had made a pact with Hell to produce Argent energy, which is created through the mass sacrifice of human souls. In return for providing worlds for Hell to invade, the Maykrs receive a share of the Argent energy produced by Hell, which allows their own dimension, Urdak, to survive.

The Slayer enters Urdak through Hell's citadel, Nekravol, and halts the Icon's awakening ceremony by using the Betrayer's dagger to destroy its heart. Free from Maykr control, the Icon of Sin awakens and teleports to Earth. With the dimensional barrier destroyed, the demons break their alliance with the Maykrs and invade Urdak. The Slayer kills the Khan Maykr before returning to Earth to confront the Icon of Sin, although VEGA is left behind to ensure the portal stays open and in doing so, learns that he is the mind of the Father, the creator of the Maykr race. The Slayer kills the Icon of Sin in battle, ending Hell's invasion of Earth.

=== The Ancient Gods ===
==== Part One ====
Despite defeating the Icon of Sin and halting Hell's invasion of Earth, the Doom Slayer's victory did not come without cost. The death of the Khan Maykr and Hell's conquest of Urdak has given the demons a chance to dominate all dimensions and reinitiate their invasion of Earth. To prevent this, the Slayer, Samuel Hayden, and ARC scientists set out to liberate the Seraphim. The Slayer travels to the UAC Atlantica Facility, where the Seraphim's containment pod is. He uploads Hayden's consciousness into the pod, and it is revealed that he and the Seraphim are one and the same.

The Seraphim, suffering from a transfiguration terminal illness, tasks the Slayer with retrieving the Father's Life Sphere from the Blood Swamps of Hell, located within the Ingmore's Sanctum, in order to combine it with VEGA and return the Father to physical form. The Slayer finds the sphere but chooses to destroy it rather than hand it to the Seraphim, and instead retrieves the Dark Lord's Life Sphere with the intent of resurrecting and then destroying him, which in turn will destroy all demons outside of Hell.

The Slayer returns to Urdak, which has been corrupted by the demons' occupation and reaches the Luminarium, which anyone with a Life Sphere may activate. However, the Slayer is confronted by the Seraphim, consumed by the degenerative transfiguration, and defeats him before the Father teleports him away. Despite being warned that bringing the Dark Lord into physical form is irreversible, the Slayer proceeds to summon him, only to be confronted with a being who is a mirror image of him.

==== Part Two ====
Having summoned the Dark Lord into existence, the Doom Slayer attempts to kill him but fails, as blood cannot be shed in the Luminarium. The Dark Lord tells the Slayer he will be waiting for him in Hell's capital city of Immora. To reach Immora, the Father informs the Slayer that he must activate the Gate of Divum, the only portal capable of reaching the city. The Slayer goes to Argent D'nur for a Wraith Crystal to power the portal, located inside the World Spear, a massive crystalline alien ship that had impaled the planet long ago (hence it "spearing" the world). On the way, the Slayer encounters the Betrayer, who has reassumed his original name, Valen, after the defeat of the Icon of Sin. The Slayer lights the Torch of Kings to rally the remaining uncorrupted Sentinel forces, then recovers the Wraith Crystal.

The Slayer activates the Gate of Divum on Earth. Traveling to Immora, the Slayer is greeted by the city's formidable defenses consisting of a massive wall and an army of demons. He is assisted by an army of Sentinels led by Valen and many of the remaining human forces, who teleport in and assault the city. While Hell's main forces are occupied with them, the Slayer follows the Dark Lord.

After fighting through Immora and being teleported to an arena, the Dark Lord and the Slayer fight. The Dark Lord reveals that he was the true creator of the multiverse and that Jekkad (later known as Hell) was the first dimension. The Maykrs, including the Father, betrayed him and rewrote history to depict the Father as the first being. This led the enraged Dark Lord to influence Samur Maykr to turn Doomguy into the Doom Slayer, whose original purpose was to (unintentionally) contribute to the destruction of the Maykrs and the Father, fulfilling the Dark Lord's revenge. The Slayer kills the Dark Lord, and all demons outside of Hell are instantly destroyed with his death, stopping the invasion for good and saving humanity and all other forms of life across the multiverse. Being one of the Dark Lord's creations himself, the Slayer falls unconscious before being sealed inside a stone sarcophagus at the Ingmore's Sanctum by the Seraphs until he is needed again.

== Development ==
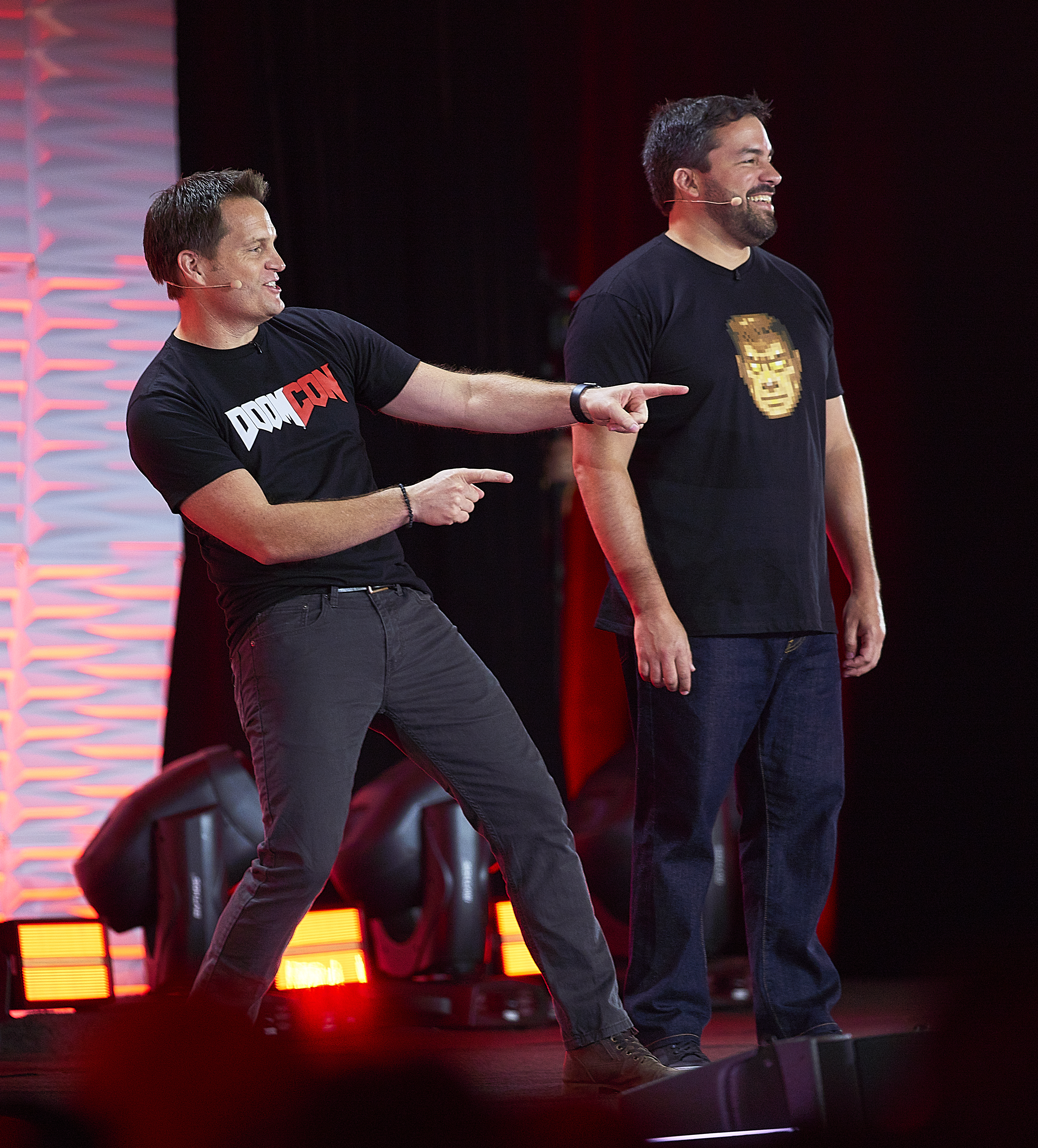
Executive producer Marty Stratton (left) and creative director Hugo Martin (right)

Doom Eternal was developed by id Software. The game entered early production in 2017. After Doom (2016) was met with a positive reception, the studio wanted to build on the positive momentum by working on a sequel and addressing the shortcomings of that game. During the marketing cycle, id Software frequently compared Eternal to Evil Dead II, where it significantly expanded on the foundation established by its predecessor. Both Hugo Martin and Marty Stratton returned, with Martin as game director and Stratton as executive producer. The team size of Eternal was about 35% to 45% larger than that of its predecessor.

While the early version of the new game retained the aggressive combat system, the team thought that newly-added movement made the experience too easy and therefore, unengaging. As a result, they decided to make enemy encounters more challenging and force players to play even more aggressively. Martin described this loop as a "fantasy combat puzzle", where players must choose the best tools to exploit specific enemy weaknesses. Slayer Gates represent the hardest challenges in the game, designed to push players to their limits and force them to master the game's systems. Ultimately, the team wanted players' to feel empowered because their adversaries were so challenging. Unlike the 2016 game where higher difficulties changed how demons behaved, Eternal instead makes enemies attack more frequently and deal greater damage to ensure that the experience remained consistent. Due to the fast-paced combat and intricate art design, the team made sure that information is clearly communicated to players, as a result, pick-ups are often highlighted with bold, bright colours that players can easily recognize from afar. Martin added that this approach was inspired by the original Doom games, as well as games developed by Nintendo.

Martin remarked that the 2016 game was "a one-trick pony". One of the players' complaints about the 2016 game was that it became repetitive towards its third act. The team attempted to solve the problem by introducing a lot more tools, adding twice as many enemy types, and introducing levels set in more diverse locations. As using different tools yields players different resources, Martin added that the overall gameplay design was to encourage players to "take what [they] need from the enemies, not hide behind a wall and wait for it to magically happen". The team realized that players would often rely only on the shotgun to eliminate enemies in the first game, and they made several adjustments to Eternal's arsenal to incentivize players to explore the use of other weapons. Enemies react to different types of weapons differently, with faster enemies evading slower projectiles and heavy enemies stomping on the player character to prevent them from getting too close. Each weapon holds less ammo when compared to Doom 2016, forcing players to use the chainsaw more to replenish them. Also, the amount of ammo pickups available in an arena is reduced. The developer compared the enemies in Doom Eternal to chess pieces, where players must consider both an enemy's weak point and attack behaviours when prioritizing targets. Aesthetically, the game aims at having a closer resemblance to the original Doom games, with the enemies' designs having been modified from those in the 2016 game to match the designs of the original games.

According to Martin, levels in Eternal are significantly larger, each featuring a three-act structure where players must "see something cool in the beginning, something new in the middle, and something fantastic at the end". The levels of Doom 64 had been cited by the team as their source of inspiration. To keep the sections between combat arenas engaging, the team added more enemy encounters and exploration puzzles to diversify gameplay. To maintain brisk pace, these puzzles were designed to be straightforward. The team also introduced platforming elements, rolling out traversal mechanics gradually throughout the campaign so players would not feel overwhelmed. Martin described these as "skill-based" puzzles, comparing them to the mechanics of the Tony Hawk's skateboarding series. Platforming sequences allowed levels to have more verticality. Also they enabled the team to expand the game's scale and introduce more diverse setpieces. The mechanics of the meat hook also evolved during development; it initially pulled enemies toward the player, but this was reversed to pull the player toward enemies to maximize mobility. While some team members proposed allowing players to hook onto any surface, the idea was ultimately rejected because the team felt it would trivialize other traversal mechanics like double-jumping and dashing.

With Eternal, the team aimed to create a "Doom universe", expanding on the lore and the setting introduced in its predecessor. While it uses cutscenes to convey its main story, the bulk of its narrative is told through codex entries. The studio compared the Doom Slayer to a superhero, a powerful being who is not emotive and only "reveals his humanity in tiny, subtle moments". While the story explored his origin, the team felt that his mysteriousness made him a more compelling character. While the Doom Slayer is a mute character, the team relied on environmental storytelling to convey his personality, such as showing how other non-playable characters react to his presence. According to Stratton, the title "Eternal" was meant to symbolize the "eternal struggle between good and evil". Despite this, characters are portrayed to be of gray morality, with the villains being designed to have relatable motivations. Ultimately, the team added that the game did not take itself seriously, with Martin recognizing that its premise was outlandish and silly. The Glory Kill executions were designed to be over-the-top and slapstick in nature instead of being disturbing.

The multiplayer of Doom 2016, outsourced to external developer Certain Affinity, received mixed reception as players felt that it was unoriginal and disconnected from the core experience. As a result, the multiplayer for the new entry was developed by id Software themselves, who wanted to translate the core gameplay loop of the campaign in a more social setting. As a result, the team came up with the "Battlemode", which allows players to fight against player-controlled demons. The studio initially planned to release an Invasion mode in which a player controlling a demon can enter the play session of another player's single-player campaign and hunt them down, though this mode was scrapped. To focus on creating the multiplayer experience and downloadable content for the game, the studio decided that the level editor from the 2016 game will not return in Eternal.

== Music ==
Mick Gordon returned as the composer. In January 2019, he put out a call for "metal screamers" to participate in a recording session to contribute to the soundtrack. The "heavy metal choir" included James Rivera of Helstar, Tony Campos of Static-X, Sven de Caluwé of Aborted, James Dorton of Black Crown Initiate, and Nature Ganganbaigal of Tengger Cavalry. Ganganbaigal died between the recording and the game's release. Oktavist Eric Hollaway also added vocals.

=== Soundtrack dispute ===
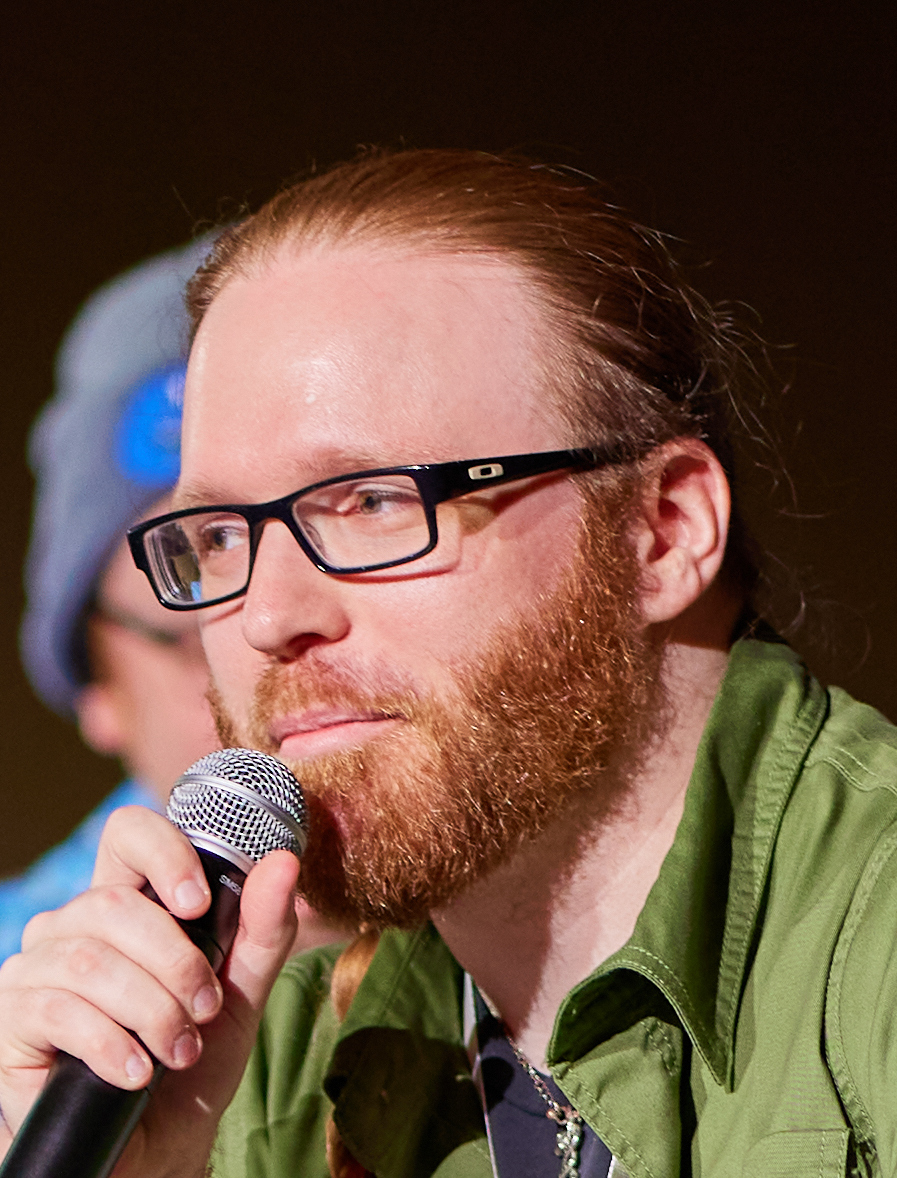
Andrew Hulshult (pictured) and David Levy replaced Mick Gordon as the composer for the game's expansion, The Ancient Gods.

The soundtrack was released for download on April 19, 2020, for buyers of the collector's edition. In the hours following the soundtrack's release, fans noticed differences between the soundtrack album and the music in the game, such as the large amount of compression on the track "BFG Division 2020" compared to the 2016 version. Gordon confirmed that he only mixed a small number of the tracks, such as "Meathook" and "Command and Control". Metadata suggests that most of the soundtrack was mixed by Chad Mossholder, id's audio director. Given his experiences working on the game, Gordon stated that he doubted he would work with id again.

In May 2020, Stratton released a statement saying that Gordon was given extensive time to mix the tracks and repeatedly delayed progress, missed deadlines, and refused to respond to emails or phone calls. According to Stratton, when Gordon did not complete the mixing before the soundtrack release deadline and refused to provide id with the source files as contractually required, Stratton suggested he collaborate with Mossholder. Gordon agreed and sent Mossholder about 12 finished tracks. Mossholder mixed and edited the remaining songs together from in-game assets, which were more heavily compressed to compensate for the other in-game audio. Stratton later wrote that although id had intended to continue working with Gordon, they would use a different composer in the future. Andrew Hulshult and David Levy composed music for The Ancient Gods campaign expansion.

In response to Stratton's post, Gordon provided his own account of the history of the in-game score, the original soundtrack (OST), and how he repeatedly attempted to engage id to resolve problems before and after the release of the OST. He further alleged that there was no contract for a soundtrack album until two days before the game release, and that Mossholder had been working on a soundtrack assembly for six months before Gordon was brought on board. Bethesda subsequently released a statement backing Stratton, Mossholder, and everyone on the id Software team. They said they had evidence to rebut Gordon's claims and implied that his statement incited harassment and violence.

== Release ==
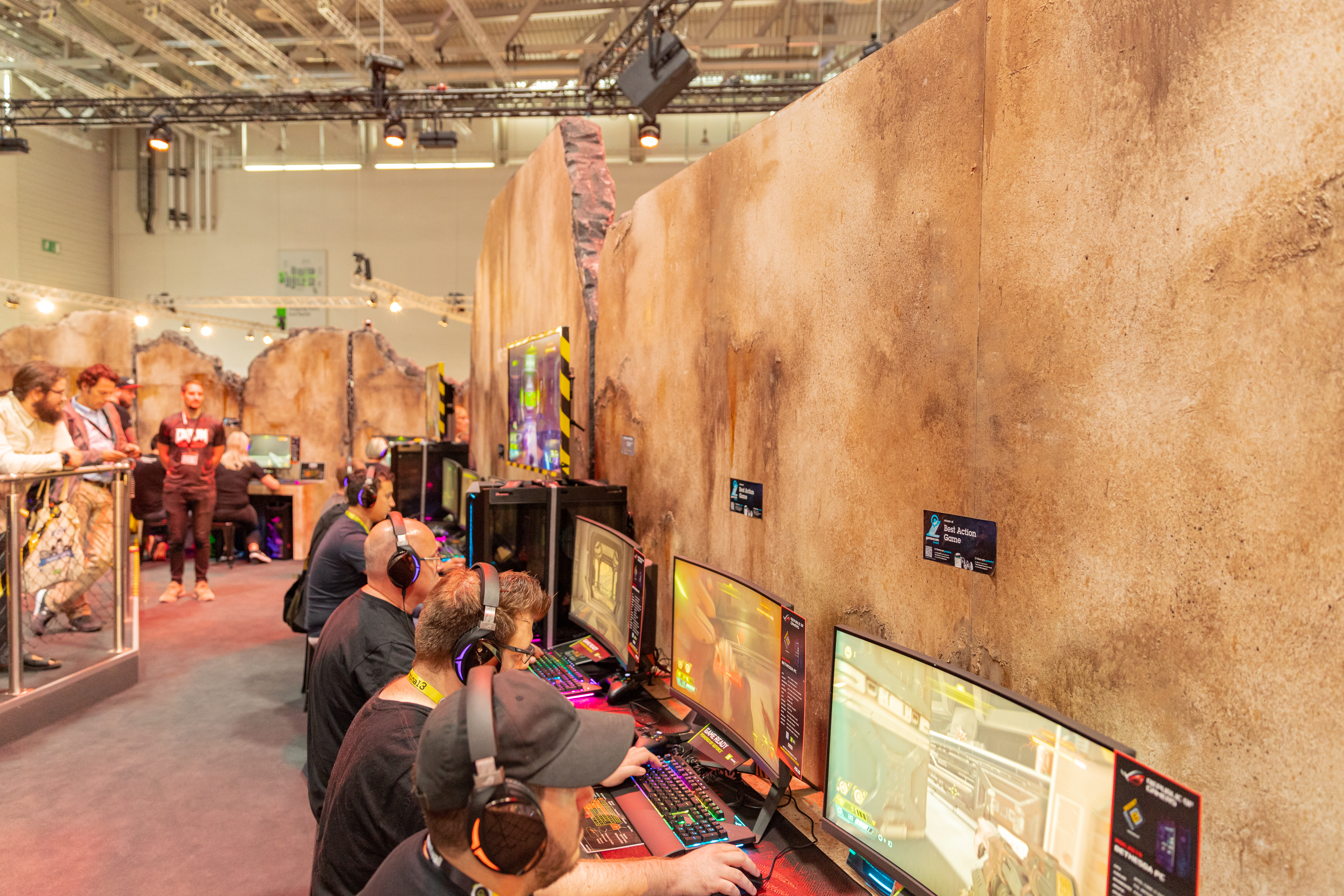
Doom Eternal at Gamescom 2019

Doom Eternal was announced by publisher Bethesda Softworks at E3 2018. Originally set to be released for Windows, PlayStation 5, Xbox One and Stadia on November 22, 2019, the game's release was delayed to March 20 the following year. Id Software had to crunch extensively throughout 2019 to finish the game. The release date for Doom Eternal coincided with that of Nintendo's Animal Crossing: New Horizons. Due to the demand expected for both games, and in light of the COVID-19 pandemic, GameStop decided to begin selling Doom Eternal one day earlier, on the 19th, to minimize crowding. The stark contrast in tone between both games, combined with them being released on the same day, prompted fans of both series to celebrate the coincidence by creating light-hearted crossover art featuring the Doomguy and Animal Crossing's Isabelle as "best friends". The Nintendo Switch version, developed by Panic Button, was released on October 8, 2020 as a digital game, while physical units of the game were distributed by Limited Run Games in July 2022. It was released for PlayStation 5 and Xbox Series X and Series S on June 29, 2021, adding higher frame rates and ray-tracing.

Players who pre-ordered the game would receive a free copy of Doom 64 as well as several cosmetic items, while players who purchased the Collector's Edition would receive a wearable Slayer helmet, access to the game's expansions, as well as other physical and in-game items. Bethesda released a 10 inches replica of the game's Crucible Blade for players to purchase, and collaborated with Dark Horse Comics and McFarlane Toys to release action figures based on the Doom Slayer.

On its initial release, the version of the game offered via the Bethesda Launcher appeared to have been intended to ship with the Denuvo digital rights management (DRM) protection software, but it was not set up properly, leaving the game DRM-free. In May 2020, the game was patched on Windows to include Denuvo anti-cheat technology, which operates by installing a kernel-mode driver. Some were concerned this would open up their computers to security vulnerabilities, while others claimed performance losses caused by the patch. This led users to review bomb the game on Steam over the decision. The studio removed Denuvo anti-cheat upon the game's next patch due the following week.

Id Software released several free updates for the game. The first major update introduced 'empowered demons'—enemies that killed a player in their own game before being transported into another player's world. Killing these empowered demons will grant players additional experience points, ammo and health. The second update introduced the Render mode, which allows players to change the visual style of the game. Both of these updates added new stages for the Battlemode. The campaign expansion, The Ancient Gods, can be played as a standalone game, and is divided into two parts. The first part of the expansion was released on October 20, 2020, while the second part was released on March 18, 2021. Both expansions were developed while the team was working from home. The Ancient Gods served as a conclusion to the Doom Slayer story arc. Both parts of the expansion received generally favourable reviews from critics. In October 2021, the company released the game's horde mode, and in August 2025, id released an update to Doom Eternal adding officially supported modifications to the game.

== Reception ==
=== Critical reception ===
Reception

Aggregate scores
Aggregator	Score
Metacritic	PC: 88/100; PS4: 87/100; XONE: 88/100; NS: 80/100
OpenCritic	95% recommend

Review scores
Publication	Score
Game Informer	9.25/10
GameSpot	8/10
GamesRadar+	3.5/5
IGN	9/10
PC Gamer (US)	94/100
Shacknews	8/10
VG247	4/5

Doom Eternal received "generally favorable" reviews, according to review aggregator website Metacritic. Fellow review aggregator OpenCritic assessed that the game received "mighty" approval, being recommended by 95% of critics.

Several reviewers praised the combat for being both approachable and deep, others perceived it to be a more challenging game when compared with its predecessor, though some noted that the gameplay became much more rewarding once they had mastered the combat. Phil Hornshaw from GameSpot noted that players had to "constantly calculate the best ways to [..] stay alive" by analyzing the battlefield and engaging their targets strategically to maximize the Slayer's resources. Andrew Reiner from Game Informer wrote that the game had the best combat in the series, in particularly commending the diverse array of weapons for allowing players to approach targets in different ways. The Destructible Demon system was also applauded for showing the player's progression during combat. The need to extract resources from enemies was praised for turning combat into a thrilling and tense experience, with James Davenport from PC Gamer describing the game as "one of the most intense shooters ever". Several critics felt that it was mechanically bloated with too many types of progression systems. Josh West from GamesRadar liked the aggressiveness of the artificial intelligence, though he disliked the game for mixing boss characters designed for one-versus-one encounters into more general fights. Writing for IGN, Ryan McCaffrey praised the introduction of enemy weak points for rewarding skillful play. However, retrospectively the game's weak-points system was criticized for being restrictive for forcing players to beat enemies in a certain way through its gameplay systems and tutorials.

The story received mixed reviews from critics. Davenport felt that the game's emphasis on world-building also meant that it lost its natural humor, and felt that the story only provided "thematic dressing" to the experience. Matthew Gault, writing for Vice, was critical of the game's heavy emphasis on narrative for breaking gameplay's momentum. Its reliance on using codex entries to tell its story was also criticized. Matthew Byrd from Den of Geek felt that the narrative in Eternal was less interesting than that of its predecessor, and felt that the Doom Slayer lacked any personality trait in the game. Hornshaw felt that the story was too long and overly serious, though he added that players do not need to engage with it to attain a worthwhile experience. Sam White, writing for British GQ, however, praised the story for providing narrative motivation to visit and explore varied locations.

The level design received mixed reviews, commended for visuals and expanded traversal opportunities but criticized for interruptive platforming sections. Kirk McKeand from VG247 praised the arena design for being "organic" and enjoyed how its boundaries fit into the surrounding environment naturally. He also noted that the game was visually more diverse than its predecessor. Sam Byford from The Verge remarked that they were "more open, diverse, and vertical" and praised its emphasis on traversal, comparing it to Titanfall 2 and Super Mario Bros. McCaffrey compared the levels to that of jungle gyms, and opined that the fast movement system allowed players to retreat and strategize during the heat of battle. Hornshaw felt that traversing a level provided a welcome change of pace to the combat. Despite disliking the puzzles for their simplicity, Reiner felt that the game's wealth of collectibles encouraged players to explore and solve them. While Davenport felt that the level design was "straightforward", he liked the expanded traversal options for enhancing its combat and contributing to some challenging navigation sequences. West strongly criticized its platforming sections, adding that they were imprecise and momentum-breaking. He concluded by adding that they "introduce points of friction in an otherwise frictionless experience".

Alex Avard from GamesRadar described Battlemode as "inventive", adding that it was as enjoyable as its main campaign. He felt that it had successfully transferred the core design pillars of the main campaign into a social experience, and remarked that playing as demons provided "a refreshing breadth of gameplay variety". McCaffrey opined that the mode was "new and exotic". Matt Cox, writing for Rock, Paper, Shotgun, praised the progression of the player in each match, noting that both the Slayer and demons become much more powerful towards the end of a match. However, it was criticized by Reiner for its lack of content and by Hornshaw for not significantly altering the core experience of Eternal. While Josh Hawkins from Shacknews lamented the loss of a traditional deathmatch mode in Eternal, Jeremy Peel from PC Gamer agreed with Bethesda that it no longer fit with the premise of the franchise.

=== Sales ===
The game had 100,000 concurrent users on Steam on launch day, more than double that of its predecessor. It also had the franchise's highest opening weekend sales.

It was the second best-selling game of the week in the UK and Switzerland, only behind Animal Crossing: New Horizons. Its physical sales were 33% less than its predecessor – a likely side-effect of the social distancing procedures implemented in wake of the COVID-19 pandemic. In North America, the game was the sixth-best-selling game of March 2020, though this does not include digital sales. SuperData estimated that, as of March 2020, the game had sold 3 million digital copies worldwide, beating 2016's Doom's 957,000 units of launch month sales. This made Eternal the fourth-highest-grossing console game of March 2020. In Germany, the game sold 100,000 units as of May 2020.

=== Accolades ===
Award	Date of ceremony	Category	Result	Ref.
Golden Joystick Awards	November 16, 2018	Most Wanted Game	Nominated	
Game Critics Awards	June 28, 2019	Best PC Game	Won	
Game Critics Awards	June 28, 2019	Best Action Game	Won	
The Game Awards	December 10, 2020	Game of the Year	Nominated	
The Game Awards	December 10, 2020	Best Score and Music	Nominated	
The Game Awards	December 10, 2020	Best Audio Design	Nominated	
The Game Awards	December 10, 2020	Best Action Game	Nominated	
The Game Awards	December 10, 2020	Player's Voice	Nominated	
New York Game Awards	January 26, 2021	Big Apple Award for Best Game of the Year	Nominated	
SXSW Gaming Awards	March 20, 2021	Video Game of the Year	Nominated	
SXSW Gaming Awards	March 20, 2021	Excellence in Score	Nominated	
SXSW Gaming Awards	March 20, 2021	Excellence in Audio Design	Won	
British Academy Games Awards	March 25, 2021	Animation	Nominated	
British Academy Games Awards	March 25, 2021	Technical Achievement	Nominated	
D.I.C.E. Awards	April 22, 2021	Action Game of the Year	Nominated	
Game Developers Choice Awards	July 21, 2021	Game of the Year	Honorable mention	
Game Developers Choice Awards	July 21, 2021	Best Audio	Nominated	
