= Doom (franchise) =

American media franchise

- Created by: John Carmack; John Romero; Adrian Carmack; Kevin Cloud; Tom Hall
- Original work: Doom (1993)
- Owner: id Software
- Years: 1993–present

Print publications
- Novel: Novel series
- Comics: Doom (1996)

Films and television
- Film: Doom (2005)
- Direct-to-video: Doom: Annihilation (2019)

Games
- Traditional: Doom: The Boardgame (2004)
- Video games: List of video games

Doom (stylized in all uppercase) is an American media franchise created by John Carmack, John Romero, Adrian Carmack, Kevin Cloud, and Tom Hall. The series usually focuses on the exploits of Flynn Taggart (often referred to as Doomguy, Doom Marine, or Doom Slayer) operating under the auspices of the Union Aerospace Corporation (UAC), who fights hordes of demons and the undead to save Earth from an apocalyptic invasion.

The original Doom is considered one of the first pioneering first-person shooter games, introducing IBM-compatible computers to features such as 3D graphics, third-dimension spatiality, networked multiplayer gameplay, and support for player-created modifications with the Doom WAD format. By 2005, the Doom series sold 10 million copies. The series has spawned numerous sequels, novels, comic books, board games, and film adaptations.

== Overview ==
The Doom video games consist of first-person shooters in which the player controls an unnamed space marine commonly referred to as Doomguy. In the 2016 series, the protagonist is called the "Doom Slayer" or just "Slayer" in later entries. The player battles the forces of Hell, consisting of demons and the undead. The games are usually set within sprawling bases on Mars or its moons, while some parts occur in Hell. The classic series had only a minimal focus on the narrative, much of which was in the manuals rather than the games. More recent titles, notably the 2016 series, would feature a heavier focus on narrative.

The original game featured eight weapons, designed so that no weapon became obsolete after the acquisition of another. With the player carrying all these weapons at once, the strategy of "gun juggling"—rapidly switching between the weapons depending on circumstance—can be employed. Outside of combat mechanics, Doom levels often feature mazes, colored key cards and hidden areas. As the genre was in its infancy in the early 1990s, the player could not jump or look up and down in the classic series due to technical limitations. Some limited platforming was however present, as players could sprint at gaps and let their momentum carry them to a destination. These features were added in newer titles, with the 2016 series in particular featuring a strong focus on platforming.

== Development and history ==
Release timeline Main series in bold
1993	**Doom**
1994	**Doom II: Hell on Earth**
1995	Master Levels for Doom II
1995	The Ultimate Doom
1996	**Final Doom**
1997	**Doom 64**
1998
1999
2000
2001
2002
2003
2004	**Doom 3**
2005	Doom 3: Resurrection of Evil
2005	Doom RPG
2006
2007
2008
2009	Doom Resurrection
2009	Doom II RPG
2010	Doom II: No Rest for the Living
2011
2012	Doom 3: BFG Edition
2013
2014
2015
2016	**Doom**
2017	Doom VFR
2018
2019	Sigil
2020	**Doom Eternal**
2020	Doom 64: The Lost Levels
2020	The Ancient Gods, Part One
2021	The Ancient Gods, Part Two
2021	Doom 3: VR Edition
2022
2023	Mighty Doom
2023	Sigil 2
2024	Doom + Doom II
2024	Doom II: Legacy of Rust
2025	**Doom: The Dark Ages**
2026	Revelations

=== Classic series (1992–1997) ===
The development of the original Doom started in 1992, when John Carmack developed a new game engine, the Doom engine, while the rest of the id Software team finished the Wolfenstein 3D prequel, Spear of Destiny. The game launched in an episodic format in 1993, with the first episode available as shareware and two more episodes available by mail order. The first episode was largely designed by John Romero. The title proved extremely popular, with the full version of the game selling one million copies. The term "Doom clone" became the name for the new genre now known as first-person shooters for several years.

Doom II: Hell on Earth was released in 1994 in a commercial format. Only minor changes were made at a technical level; the game featured new enemies, a new "Super Shotgun" weapon, and more complex levels. The game was followed by an expansion in 1995, titled Master Levels for Doom II, which added 20 additional levels. A fourth episode was added to the original game by the 1995 re-release.

From 1995 id Software were focused on the development of the new Quake series, which would be developed by the company throughout the late 1990s. Two additional games would be released over the following years, largely created by third-party developers under id's supervision. The first of these was Final Doom, which featured 64 levels based on the Doom II engine, organised into two episodes. TNT: Evilution was developed by the modding group TeamTNT and completed in November 1995, while the second episode The Plutonia Experiment was developed by TNT's Dario and Milo Casali and completed in January 1996.

Midway Games developed Doom 64 under id supervision for release in 1997. The title featured a new engine, with larger sprites and higher quality textures. The technical changes allowed for greater flexibility with the level design, such as the ability to adjust the geometry of the map during play. The classic metal soundtrack was replaced for a more ambient and eerie soundtrack, creating a unique atmosphere that would inspire future entries. Id did not allow the title to be called Doom 3, as the name was being reserved for a potential return to the franchise after the development of Quake.

=== Doom 3 and cancelled fourth game (2000–2013) ===
The troubled development of Quake had resulted in major staffing changes at id by 2000, with a number of key figures from the development of Doom having departed. This included the original designer John Romero, who was fired in 1996. In the interim, the company had hired former Doom modder Tim Willits. By 2000 a new non-Doom game was being designed, but id staff had a "lack of enthusiasm" for the project, and strongly desired to remake the original Doom instead. John Carmack, among others, announced internally that they were working on a Doom game- and would continue to do so unless the company fired them. While Paul Steed was indeed fired, work on the game did continue.

The title was unveiled later that year as Doom 3. The design of the title would be led by Willits. Using the new id Tech 4 engine, numerous technical improvements were made over the classic series, allowing greater realism and interactivity. The game used voice acting and featured a greater focus on narrative than earlier titles. A demo of the game was shown at E3 2002 and was subsequently leaked online, well ahead of the 2004 release date. At the time, it was the first Doom title in seven years, and helped renew interest in the franchise. An expansion, Doom 3: Resurrection of Evil was released in 2005. Unlike the base game, the expansion was developed by Nerve Software. A 2012 BFG Edition featured both previous releases along with a new expansion entitled The Lost Mission. A version of Doom 3: BFG Edition called Doom 3: VR Edition was released on March 29, 2021, for the PlayStation 4 VR and PlayStation 5 via backwards compatibility. It includes all of the content from Doom 3: BFG Edition (the main campaign, Resurrection of Evil and The Lost Mission), except for multiplayer.

Doom 4 entered development in the mid 2000s alongside Rage, with the new Doom title initially planned as a rework of Doom II. Hints were present in 2007 at QuakeCon, and the game was formally announced in 2008. Response to preview material was negative, with fans nicknaming the project "Call of Doom", after a perceived similarity to the Call of Duty franchise. Bethesda marketing vice president Pete Hines stated in retrospect that "it wasn't Doom enough". After Rage was not as successful as hoped, publisher ZeniMax requested a reboot of Doom 4 and moved the Rage staff over to the new project. This version was built using Rage's code base and suffered from disputes among staff, particularly among managers of the two projects. The game was cancelled in 2013. John Carmack, one of the few remaining veterans from the development of the classic series still present at id, left the studio that November.

The period saw the release of several spinoffs for mobile platforms. These included Doom RPG (2005), Doom II RPG (2009), and Doom Resurrection (2009). Additionally, the 2010 Xbox Live Arcade re-release of Doom II featured a new expansion entitled No Rest for the Living, which was developed by Nerve Software. This was structured in a similar manner to classic Doom chapters, with eight primary levels and one secret level. This release was packaged with the BFG Edition of Doom 3 in 2012.

=== Revival series (2013–present) ===
After the 2013 scrapping of the Doom 4 project, Willits stated that the next game in the Doom series was still the team's focus. Hugo Martin was hired as creative director that year and would go on to be a key figure in the revived franchise. The game was announced simply as Doom in 2014. It was released to generally positive reception in 2016, with a glory kill mechanic and additional platforming manoeuvres among the main gameplay additions. The game's multiplayer mode received three small downloadable content releases over the course of the first year, and all three were then released for free with the 6.66 update on July 19, 2017.

The 2016 series was not originally described as a continuation or origin story of earlier games, however plot details in the sequel Doom Eternal and commentary from Martin would later describe it as a continuation of the classic series. The 2020 re-release of Doom 64 included an expansion entitled The Lost Levels, intended "to connect 'old' Doom to 'new' Doom".

A VR spinoff entitled Doom VFR was released in 2017 to generally positive reception. The game features a single-player campaign, and reused enemies and other assets from the 2016 game. The game would be the last Doom title under Willits' leadership, ahead of his departure in 2019. 2018 marked the 25th anniversary of the franchise, and saw the Doom Slayer included as a playable character in id Software's Quake Champions. That year, John Romero announced Sigil, an unofficial "fifth episode" of the original 1993 game. The episode was released for free via Romero's website in 2019, with a paid version available that included a soundtrack by guitarist Buckethead. While Sigil was developed independently, Bethesda added the episode to the console ports of Doom as a free patch in October, alongside the two chapters of Final Doom.

The next main entry in the franchise, Doom Eternal, was directed by Hugo Martin and released in 2020. The title sold very well, generating $450 million in revenue over the first year; double the launch revenue of the previous title. Some commentators cited the timing of the release, which coincided with a wave of interest in gaming worldwide amid restrictions on social gathering during the COVID-19 pandemic. The game was made in id Tech 7, which afforded numerous technical improvements over the id Tech 6 engine used by its predecessor. An expansion of the game, The Ancient Gods, was released in two parts, one in October 2020 and the other in March 2021.

Romero confirmed in August 2021 that a second Sigil expansion using the Doom II engine was in development. In March 2022, he released a new Doom II level entitled One Humanity. The proceeds from the level were donated as humanitarian aid for Ukraine amid the Russian invasion. The level was the first for Doom II designed by Romero since 1994, and raised 25,000 euros by March 7. Romero released Sigil II in 2023 and was critically acclaimed. Like its predecessor, Id Software made the chapter freely available through the add-ons menu of the console ports of Doom and Doom II. A spin-off for mobile platforms Android and iOS, Mighty Doom, was developed by Alpha Dog Games and released in March 2023. Microsoft announced that it was shutting down Alpha Dog in May 2024; this resulted in the discontinuation of Mighty Doom in August.

In August 2024, id Software in collaboration with Nightdive Studios and MachineGames released Doom + Doom II, a "definitive rerelease" of all the pre-Doom 64 games alongside Sigil and a new 2 episode expansion pack called Legacy of Rust. The release features new enemies and weapons.

In March 2021, Hugo Martin discussed some directions future Doom titles could take, discussing time travel or a game set in the time span between Doom 64 and Doom (2016), when the Doom Slayer "first came to that place with the Sentinels, almost like a more medieval setting". An internal ZeniMax presentation, dated to 2020 and released as part of the FTC v. Microsoft case in 2023, indicated that a game entitled Doom: Year Zero was in development at that time, with a projected release in FY2023. DLC for the title was also marked for 2023 and 2024. The document was produced prior to Microsoft's acquisition of ZeniMax in 2021, but the game remained in production and was revealed at the 2024 Xbox Games Showcase as Doom: The Dark Ages.

== Games ==
=== Main series ===
Game	Details
Doom Original release date: NA: December 10, 1993; EU: December 1993	Release years by system: 1993 – MS-DOS; 1994 – Sega 32X, Atari Jaguar; 1995 – Super Nintendo Entertainment System, PlayStation; 1996 – 3DO; 1997 – Sega Saturn; 1998 – Acorn Archimedes / Risc PC; 2001 – Game Boy Advance; 2006 – Xbox 360 (original Activision release); 2009 – iOS; 2012 – Xbox 360 (Bethesda re-release); 2019 – Nintendo Switch, PlayStation 4, Xbox One, Android; 2020 – Meta Quest (Unofficial QuestZDoom VR mod); 2024 – PlayStation 5, Xbox Series X/S
Doom Original release date: NA: December 10, 1993; EU: December 1993	Notes: Originally developed by id Software and published by GT Interactive.; On April 30, 1995, an updated version of the game, The Ultimate Doom, was released; it included a new fourth episode, "Thy Flesh Consumed", in addition to the original three episodes.; On December 23, 1997, John Carmack released the source code of Doom for Linux under a proprietary Doom Source License.; On October 3, 1999, John Carmack relicensed the source code of Doom for Linux to GNU GPL-2.0-or-later. Since then the list of Doom ports has grown from game consoles and operating systems that never saw an official release (including some pre-Android and pre-iOS early smart phones), to unusual devices such as oscilloscopes and other embedded systems.; On November 3, 2009, John Carmack released the source code of Doom on iOS under GNU GPL-2.0-or-later. It does not run on modern iPhones, but can be emulated and run on PCs and Android phones with touchHLE emulator.; On May 22, 2019, John Romero released an unofficial 5th episode titled "Sigil" to commemorate the game's 25th anniversary.; On July 14, 2020, Randal Linden released the source code of Doom on SNES under GNU GPL-3.0-or-later.; On December 10, 2023, John Romero released an unofficial 6th episode titled "Sigil II" to commemorate the game's 30th anniversary.
Doom II: Hell on Earth Original release date: WW: October 10, 1994	Release years by system: 1994 – MS-DOS; 1995 – Mac OS; 1998 – Acorn Archimedes / Risc PC; 2002 – Game Boy Advance; 2010 – Xbox 360 (original Activision release); 2012 – Xbox 360 (Bethesda re-release); 2019 – Nintendo Switch, PlayStation 4, Xbox One, iOS, Android; 2020 – Meta Quest (Unofficial QuestZDoom VR mod); 2024 – PlayStation 5, Xbox Series X/S
Doom II: Hell on Earth Original release date: WW: October 10, 1994	Notes: Originally developed by id Software and published by GT Interactive.; On December 26, 1995, an expansion pack, Master Levels for Doom II, was released; it included 21 additional levels.; On May 26, 2010, an expansion pack, Doom II: No Rest for the Living, was released for the Xbox 360 release of the game, developed by Nerve Software.
Final Doom Original release date: NA: June 17, 1996; EU: 1996	Release years by system: 1996 – MS-DOS, PlayStation, Mac OS; 2020 – Nintendo Switch, PlayStation 4, Xbox One (as a free add-on available for both Doom and Doom II); 2024 – PlayStation 5, Xbox Series X/S (included with Doom I + II)
Final Doom Original release date: NA: June 17, 1996; EU: 1996	Notes: Developed by TeamTNT and published originally by id Software.; Final Doom is a compilation of two standalone Doom II modifications, TNT: Evilution and The Plutonia Experiment, which include full sets of new levels (both of them use the same level structure as Doom II with 30 regular levels and two secret levels), new graphics and textures, new music (for TNT: Evilution), and new text interlude screens in addition to most of the resources from Doom II and some from Doom.
Doom 64 Original release dates: NA: April 4, 1997; PAL: December 2, 1997	Release years by system: 1997 – Nintendo 64; 2020 – Microsoft Windows, Nintendo Switch, PlayStation 4, Stadia, Xbox One (Bethesda re-release)
Doom 64 Original release dates: NA: April 4, 1997; PAL: December 2, 1997	Notes: Originally developed and published by Midway Games.; The 2020 port is higher-resolution than the original, and includes a new multi-level sequel chapter.
Doom 3 Original release dates: NA: August 3, 2004; EU: August 13, 2004	Release years by system: 2004 – Microsoft Windows, Linux; 2005 – OS X, Xbox
Doom 3 Original release dates: NA: August 3, 2004; EU: August 13, 2004	Notes: Originally developed by id Software and published by Activision.; The Xbox version contains the full versions of The Ultimate Doom and Doom II, but they are only available in the limited collector's edition.; On November 22, 2011, id Software released the source code under GNU GPL-3.0-or-later.
Doom 3: Resurrection of Evil Original release dates: NA: April 3, 2005; EU: April 8, 2005	Release years by system: 2005 – Microsoft Windows, Linux, Xbox
Doom 3: Resurrection of Evil Original release dates: NA: April 3, 2005; EU: April 8, 2005	Notes: Developed by Nerve Software and published by Activision.; Expansion pack for Doom 3, which requires Doom 3 to play on Microsoft Windows.; The Xbox version does not require Doom 3 to play and also contains the full versions of The Ultimate Doom, Doom II, and Master Levels for Doom II.
Doom 3: BFG Edition Original release dates: NA: October 16, 2012; AU: October 18, 2012; EU: October 19, 2012	Release years by system: 2012 – Microsoft Windows, PlayStation 3, Xbox 360; 2015 – Nvidia Shield; 2019 – Nintendo Switch, PlayStation 4, Xbox One; 2021 – Sony PSVR ("BFG" missing from the title)
Doom 3: BFG Edition Original release dates: NA: October 16, 2012; AU: October 18, 2012; EU: October 19, 2012	Notes: Originally developed by id Software and published by Bethesda Softworks.; HD remasters of Doom 3 and its expansion Resurrection of Evil. A new expansion pack is also included in the game titled The Lost Mission.; The game also includes the full versions of The Ultimate Doom and Doom II, including the No Rest for the Living expansion pack by Nerve Software.; On November 26, 2012, id Software released the source code under GNU GPL-3.0-or-later.; The official VR version of the game on PSVR (2021) is ported from the BFG Edition, although the title of the game does not include the acronym "BFG".
Doom Original release date: WW: May 13, 2016	Release years by system: 2016 – Microsoft Windows, PlayStation 4, Xbox One; 2017 – Nintendo Switch; 2020 – Stadia
Doom Original release date: WW: May 13, 2016	Notes: Developed by id Software and published by Bethesda Softworks.; Multiplayer co-developed with Certain Affinity.; SnapMap co-developed with Escalation Studios.
Doom Eternal Original release date: WW: March 20, 2020	Release years by system: 2020 – Microsoft Windows, Nintendo Switch, PlayStation 4, Stadia, Xbox One; 2021 – PlayStation 5, Xbox Series X/S
Doom Eternal Original release date: WW: March 20, 2020	Notes: Developed by id Software and published by Bethesda Softworks.; Sequel to the 2016 reboot.; A two-part standalone campaign downloadable content titled The Ancient Gods was released in October 2020 and March 2021.
Doom 3: VR Edition Original release date: WW: March 29, 2021	Release years by system: 2021 – PlayStation 4 VR
Doom 3: VR Edition Original release date: WW: March 29, 2021	Notes: Originally developed by id Software and published by Bethesda Softworks.; HD remasters of Doom 3: BFG Edition.; Also playable on PlayStation 5 with backwards-compatibility.
Doom: The Dark Ages Original release date: WW: May 15, 2025	Release years by system: 2025 – Microsoft Windows, Xbox Series X/S, PlayStation 5
Doom: The Dark Ages Original release date: WW: May 15, 2025	Notes: Prequel to the 2016 reboot.; The first expansion, titled Revelations was released on July 7, 2026.

=== Spin-offs ===
Game	Details
Doom RPG Original release date: WW: September 13, 2005	Release years by system: 2005 – mobile
Doom RPG Original release date: WW: September 13, 2005	Notes: Developed by Fountainhead Entertainment and published by JAMDAT Mobile.; Released for BREW and Java ME
Doom Resurrection Original release date: WW: June 26, 2009	Release years by system: 2009 – iOS
Doom Resurrection Original release date: WW: June 26, 2009	Notes: Developed by Escalation Studios and published by id Software.; Set in parallel to Doom 3.
Doom II RPG Original release date: WW: November 23, 2009	Release years by system: 2009 – Java ME, BlackBerry OS; 2010 – Windows Mobile, iOS
Doom II RPG Original release date: WW: November 23, 2009	Notes: Developed and published by id Software.
Doom Pinball Original release date: WW: December 6, 2016	Release years by system:
Doom Pinball Original release date: WW: December 6, 2016	Notes: Release years by game: 2016 - Pinball FX 2; 2017 - Pinball FX 3; 2026 - Pinball FX; Bethesda Pinball DLC developed and published by Zen Studios.
Doom VFR Original release date: WW: December 1, 2017	Release years by system: 2017 – Windows Mixed Reality, HTC Vive, PS VR
Doom VFR Original release date: WW: December 1, 2017	Notes: Developed by id Software and published by Bethesda Softworks.; Virtual-reality game, set during the events of Doom (2016).
Mighty Doom Original release date: WW: March 21, 2023	Release years by system: 2023 – mobile
Mighty Doom Original release date: WW: March 21, 2023	Notes: Top-down shooter developed by Alpha Dog Games featuring a mini version of Doom Slayer. Shut down on August 7, 2024.

== Other media ==
=== Novels ===
A set of four novels based on Doom were written by Dafydd ab Hugh and Brad Linaweaver, and were published between June 1995 and January 1996 by Pocket Books. The books, listed in order, are titled Knee Deep in the Dead, Hell on Earth, Infernal Sky and Endgame. The unnamed Marine is called "Flynn Taggart" or "Fly" in the novels. The first two books feature recognizable locations and situations from the first two games. A film novelization was released by Pocket Star Books in 2005. It was adapted by John Shirley.

In 2008, a new series of Doom novels by Matthew J. Costello, an author who had worked on the story and scripts for Doom 3 and Resurrection of Evil, were published. The series of books aim to novelize the story of Doom 3, with the first installment, Doom 3: Worlds on Fire, published on February 26, 2008. The second book in the series, Doom 3: Maelstrom, was released in March 2009.

Richart Cobbett of PC Gamer called the first installment of the Doom novels "the only one genuinely worth bothering with for the laughs", describing the other novels as largely unrelated sci-fi stories.

=== Comic book ===
A one-shot comic book written by Steve Behling and Michael Stewart with art by Tom Grindberg was released in May 1996 by Marvel Comics as a giveaway for a video game convention and has gained a cult following for its over-the-top dialogue. Phrases such as "rip and tear" and "huge guts" have since been referenced by later Doom titles.

=== Tabletop games ===
In 2004, a board game designed by Kevin Wilson and published by Fantasy Flight Games titled Doom: The Boardgame was released.

In 2020, Critical Role published a fifth edition Dungeons & Dragons module entitled Doom Eternal: Assault on Amaros Station. The game was written by Christopher Lockey and Matthew Mercer, and received a digital release via the Critical Role store on December 16, 2020.

=== Films ===
==== Doom (2005) ====
In 2005, Universal Pictures released the first live-action film adaptation, titled Doom, which starred Karl Urban and Dwayne Johnson.

==== Doom: Annihilation (2019) ====
In 2019, Universal released a second live-action film adaptation direct-to-video, titled Doom: Annihilation starring Amy Manson.

== Reception ==
Aggregate review scores As of January 21, 2021.
Game	GameRankings	Metacritic
Doom (1993)	(PC) 86.67% (PS1) 84.00% (iOS) 82.86% (X360) 80.16% (32X) 80.00% (GBA) 79.87% (JAG) 78.75% (SNES) 54.05% (SAT) 47.00%	(iOS) 84 (X360) 82 (GBA) 81
Doom II: Hell on Earth	(PC) 95.00% (X360) 77.36% (GBA) 76.64%	(PC) 83 (X360) 77 (GBA) 77
Final Doom	(PS1) 80.71% (MAC) 60.00% (PC) 56.00%	
Doom 64	(N64) 73.47%	(XONE) 77 (PS4) 75 (Switch) 77
Doom 3	(Xbox) 87.63% (PC) 86.63%	(Xbox) 88 (PC) 87
Doom 3: Resurrection of Evil	(PC) 79.52% (Xbox) 78.02%	(PC) 78 (Xbox) 77
Doom RPG	(MOBI) 87.45%	—
Doom Resurrection	(iOS) 86.43%	(iOS) 79
Doom II RPG	(MOBI) 80.00% (iOS) 79.00%	(iOS) 80
Doom 3: BFG Edition	(PS3) 68.00% (X360) 66.63% (PC) 51.67%	(PS3) 67 (X360) 67 (PC) 59
Doom (2016)	(XONE) 89.04% (PS4) 85.82% (PC) 85.38%	(XONE) 87 (PS4) 85 (PC) 85 (Switch) 79
Doom Eternal		(XONE) 88 (PS4) 87 (PC) 88 (Switch) 81
Doom 3: VR Edition		(PS4) 67
Doom: The Dark Ages		(PC) 85 (PS5) 83 (XSXS) 85

In 1996, Next Generation ranked the series as the 19th top game of all time, for how "despite the hundreds of copycat titles, no one has ever been able to equal id's original, pulsing classic." In 1999, Next Generation listed the Doom series as number 25 on their "Top 50 Games of All Time," commenting that, "despite the graphic advances since Doom was released, the pixilated Barons of Hell and Cyber Demons still rank as some of the scariest things that can grace your screen."

The series' unnamed protagonist, a marine, has had a mostly positive reception. In 2009, GameDaily included "the Marine" on its list of "ten game heroes who fail at the simple stuff" for his inability to look up and down in the original series. UGO Networks ranked him fourth on its 2012 list of best silent protagonists in video games, noting his courage to continue in silence even when he faces Hell's army. In 2013, Complex ranked Doomguy at number 16 on its list of the greatest soldiers in video games for being "the original video game space marine" and "one of the classic silent protagonists." Both CraveOnline and VGRC ranked him the fifth most "badass" male character in the history of video games.

=== Sales ===
The original Doom sold 3.5 million physical copies and 1.15 million shareware copies from its 1993 release up through 1999. Doom II sold 1.55 million copies of all types in the United States during the same period, with about a quarter of that number also sold in Europe, a total of some 5-6 million sales for the original duology. Doom 3 sold 3.5 million copies along with many copies of the expansion pack Resurrection of Evil from its 2004 release up through 2007, making it the most successful game in the series at that point. The sales of Doom 64 were not disclosed.

By 2004, the series sold 8.5 million copies.

The 2016 reboot sold over 2 million copies on the PC alone from its May 2016 release up to July 2017.
