= Orcs & Elves =

2006 video game

- North American Nintendo DS box art
- Developers: id Software; Fountainhead Entertainment
- Publishers: EA Mobile (mobile); Electronic Arts (Nintendo DS)
- Director: Katherine Anna Kang
- Producer: Katherine Anna Kang
- Designers: Katherine Anna Kang; Matthew C. Ross
- Programmer: John Carmack
- Composer: Richard Douglas
- Platforms: Mobile phone, Nintendo DS
- Release: Mobile: NA: May 9, 2006; EU: February 28, 2007; Nintendo DS: NA: November 13, 2007; EU: November 16, 2007
- Genre: Role-playing

Orcs & Elves is a 2006 role-playing video game for the mobile phone and Nintendo DS. It was developed by id Software and Fountainhead Entertainment and published by EA Mobile and licensed by Nintendo for the DS version. It was released for mobile phones in May 2006 before being ported to the Nintendo DS in November 2007. The game is based on Doom RPG's engine and is id's first original intellectual property since Quake. The DS port of the game included graphical enhancements, such as 3D environments and camera cutscenes, along with improved character sprites, two new levels and the use of the touchscreen feature.

In Orcs & Elves, the protagonist, a young Elf must retake a dwarven city from the evil army of Orcs occupying it. A sequel titled Orcs & Elves II has been released for mobile phones.

== Gameplay ==
Nintendo DS version displaying double screens, with the lower as the touch screen

Orcs & Elves is a turn-based role-playing game, played from a first person perspective. Each individual action by the player counts as a "turn", whether that be movement, using an item or weapon or casting a spell in which other foes will also move and attack in turns following each. Each forward move by the player is done on an invisible grid that makes up each level in order to retain the turn-based element while appearing more like a first person adventure due to its fast-paced nature.

Each level is set in a maze environment such as a dungeon or cavern with a start and end point, containing multiple corridors and rooms that can be visited at any time. Many paths are cut off and require certain objectives to be completed in order to advance, such as activate hidden switches, locate helpful ghosts and opening rune gates that require a code of four runes. Some foes also require different strategies in order to defeat with some being resistant to certain attacks such as magic.

The mobile phone single display

The RPG elements, along with those of dungeon crawlers, come in the form of basic leveling up of the player and collecting and trading items and gold. As the player progresses they will level up, increasing their overall stats such as health, strength and defense, through slaying foes, completing objectives and locating hidden areas and items, many of which can be repeated. Although to begin with the player is equipped with just a basic sword and a wand called "Ellon" they can also find various items, along with gold, throughout each level, which they can spend on new equipment by visiting "Gaya the Dragon", located by entering portals at the end of each level. Equipment can have both passive and active effects, such as armor to improve defense, repair kits for damaged armor, magic rings and potions that improve certain stats or heal and stronger weapons like war hammers and crossbows or spells for the wand Ellon to be used in combat like lightning and fire attacks.

In the Nintendo DS version of the game, spells can be cast through drawing runes on the touchscreen for each spell using the DS' stylus. Movement, item management and menu navigation can also be done using this feature along with the option of button controls.

== Story ==
=== Characters ===
Players take control of the protagonist Elli, an Elf warrior and son of the famous Elf adventurer Eol. Despite his heroic position, Elli is never seen outside of the player's first person perspective (except in concept art found online or unlockable in the DS version) and never directly speaks to other characters. However, Elli wields a wand known as Ellon, that not only can speak but exchanges dialogue with others throughout the story, making Ellon Elli's form of interaction. Despite being only a wand however, Ellon embodies an almost human personality, in many instances often exchanging jokes or arguments with friend and foe alike.

Another prominent character is King Brahm, king of the Dwarf mountain city of Zharrakarag and friend of Elli's father, Eol. While not initially seen at the beginning of the story, Elli must locate him in order to learn more and eventually track down the perpetrators of the Orc invasion. Other friendly characters encountered throughout the game are the ghosts of the fallen dwarf inhabitants, who despite their demise aid the player through guiding them and unlocking impassable doors. Some of the dwarf ghosts are encountered multiple times, such as Sarbok, a dwarf ale brewer who will invite Elli to drink with him before continuing with the quest on several occasions and Nestri, the first dwarf encountered, proving to be a key ally throughout.

Another recurring character is the dragon Gaya, who sits in a lair near the top of the mountain guarding a vast treasure who uses it to trade with adventurers and the dwarves, where King Brahm made a deal with the dragon as a supplier. Elli can teleport in between levels via portals and can even trade rare artifacts for better, more expensive equipment.

=== Plot ===
From the beginning, Elli and Ellon receive a "cryptic message" from King Brahm, the Dwarf ruler of Mount Zharrkarag and close friend of Elli's father.

Upon arriving at Zharrkarag, Elli and Ellon encounter a ghost of a fallen Dwarf inhabitant, Iog or Nestri who informs the pair that the mountain city has been attacked by Orcs. With the help of other Dwarf ghosts, the pair reach the Dragon's Lair, home of the dragon Gaya who assists the player throughout by trading loot with Elli. As they explore the prison, they encounter a captive Dark Elf, revealing their part in the invasion. Later, after battling through waves of Orcs and giant insects, Elli encounters and defeats the great weaver Sonja.

Moving into the Zharrkarag forge, the ghost of the Forge Master informs Elli and Ellon that King Brahm is dead but can still be contacted in the Dwarf King's Throne Room. After meeting the King, Elli is given possession of his powerful Warhammer Abraxas to aid him in battle against the Orc warlord Bruul.

Upon reaching the Pit and defeating Bruul, Elli is informed that the leader of the overall invasion is Kai'Laria, a powerful dark elf sorceress. Elli and Ellon confront her in the Twilight Cavern where at first it appears she is defeated, but she quickly returns as a ghost, supposedly invincible against physical attacks and thus more powerful. However, before she can strike back, the ghosts of the fallen Dwarves appear and surround her, draining her magic and shifting the Cavern's walls, thus imprisoning her now powerless spirit inside.

The Dwarves thank both Elli and Ellon before finally being free and passing into the afterlife in peace.

=== Nintendo DS version ===
In the Nintendo DS version, there are two additional levels that can be accessed in the Dragon's Lair at any time in the game. Elli encounters a yellow "wererat" called Flopsie stuck in Gaya's food pen with an Orc, who promises to lead Elli to a "powerful weapon" in exchange for freeing only him. Upon releasing Flopsie, he leads Elli into a fiery cavern called Brimstone before Gaya's nests of eggs. By this point it is revealed that Flopsie only used Elli to gain access to Gaya's eggs to feed on them. Elli starts to try and slay Flopsie. After a few tries, Flopsie releases Lava Dwellers on Elli. After defeating the lava dwellers, Elli and Ellon chase Flopsie to the Burrows. After fighting weavers, centipede hatchlings, and centipedes Elli and Ellon finally find Flopsie. Elli pursues Flopsie into monster insect invested burrows where the wererat is surrounded and slaughtered by giant centipedes.

== Reception ==
Publication	Score
Mobile Phone
IGN	8.4/10
1UP.com	Grade A
DS
IGN	8/10
1UP.com	Grade B
GameSpot	7/10
Game Informer	6.75/10
GameSpy	3.5/5
Eurogamer	6/10
GameTrailers	7.9/10

Upon its first release on the mobile phone, Orcs & Elves was received well by critics with an average score of 86% at GameRankings. IGN praised the game's look by stating "There's no way you cannot be impressed with the overall look and atmosphere of the game" while pointing out that it is "remarkably similar in mechanics and control" to Doom RPG. 1UP.com praised the story for having more depth than most other games on the mobile phone, that it "has some characters we can care a bit about and a story that goes beyond a thin excuse to run around killing things in mazes."

The later Nintendo DS release was met with a less positive, yet still fair response, with an average critic score of 72%. Many complaints came from the fact the game had been ported to a more technically capable system, making its origins as a mobile phone game more noticeable, such as simple graphics and short game length. GameSpot noted this by saying "Orcs & Elves' simplicity doesn't do much to hide its roots as a mobile phone game" Eurogamer mentioned "what would be a surprising effort for a mobile phone is somewhat disappointing on the DS", being more of "a thick lump of nostalgia" while GameSpy found it "looks different and plays better than the mobile phone original" and that "more than innovating, the game is designed to stay true to a certain tradition that old-school players will definitely welcome after years of starvation."

On the game's level design GameTrailers found it made the game "pretty engaging throughout", being "nothing out of the ordinary yet oddly compelling", yet "a short lived experience". GamesRadar concluded that the "dungeons are well-designed, the action is well-balanced and fun, and even the characters are likable." Reviewing the latest version, IGN still felt "even with its limitations, Orcs & Elves’ fast-paced, turn-based style is a refreshing change of pace from the evolved role-playing game design" while Game Informer more negatively concluded "you may be better off making up your own fantasy game with RPG Maker."

The game sold 400,000 copies.

=== Awards ===
Before its release on the mobile phone, IGN named Orcs & Elves Best RPG at their Best of E3 2006 Awards, Wireless category. Following its mobile release, it was named Mobile Game of the Year at the 10th Annual Interactive Achievement Awards, and Best Mobile Game at the 2006 Leipzig Games Convention. IGN later award it Best Story for their Best of 2006 Wireless awards and included in the best games of 2006 list by The Village Voice.
