= Doom II RPG =

2009 video game

- Developer: id Software
- Publisher: id Software
- Director: Katherine Anna Kang
- Producer: Katherine Anna Kang
- Designer: Matthew C. Ross
- Programmer: John Carmack
- Composer: Christian Antkow
- Series: Doom
- Platforms: Java ME, BlackBerry OS, Windows Mobile, iOS
- Release: Java ME: WW: November 23, 2009; BlackBerry: WW: December 11, 2009; Windows Mobile: WW: February 1, 2010; iOS: WW: February 8, 2010
- Genres: Role-playing, first-person shooter
- Mode: Single-player

Doom II RPG is a 2009 role-playing video game developed and published by id Software. It is the sequel to Doom RPG. It was released for Java ME on November 23, 2009, and for iOS on February 8, 2010. It uses the Wolfenstein RPG engine and was developed by id partners Fountainhead Entertainment via the merger id Mobile.

The iOS version can be played on modern hardware (PC and Android) with touchHLE emulator.

== Reception ==
Reception

Aggregate score
Aggregator	Score
Metacritic	80/100

Review scores
Publication	Score
4Players	73%
IGN	8/10
Macworld	4/5
Pocket Gamer	3.5/5
TouchArcade	4.5/5
