= Doom II =

1994 video game

- Cover art by Brom, depicting the Doomguy firing a shotgun at a Cyberdemon
- Developer: id Software (Note: Ported to PC-98 by Infinity Co., Mac OS by Lion Entertainment, Game Boy Advance by Torus Games, Zodiac by Machineworks Northwest, Xbox 360 by Nerve Software, who also developed the 2019 release, and Nvidia Shield by Nvidia Lightspeed Studios, while the 2024 release was developed by Nightdive Studios)
- Publisher: id Software (Note: The European MS-DOS version, Game Boy Advance, Xbox 360 and PlayStation 3 versions, as well as the 2019 and 2024 releases, were published by Virgin Interactive Entertainment, Activision and Bethesda Softworks respectively.)
- Designers: Sandy Petersen; John Romero; Shawn Green; American McGee
- Programmers: John Carmack; John Romero; Dave Taylor
- Artists: Adrian Carmack; Kevin Cloud
- Composer: Robert Prince (Note: The 2024 release featured a new "IDKFA" arrangement soundtrack by Andrew Hulshult.)
- Series: Doom
- Engine: Doom engine (Note: The 2019 release uses Unity, while the 2024 release uses the KEX Engine.)
- Platforms: MS-DOS: Mac OS; PC-98; Game Boy Advance; Tapwave Zodiac; Xbox 360; Xbox One; Xbox Series X/S; PlayStation 3; PlayStation 4; PlayStation 5; Nintendo Switch; Sega Saturn; PlayStation; Android; iOS
- Release: October 10, 1994: MS-DOS; WW: October 10, 1994 (Note: Some online sources point to a September 30, 1994 release date, but that date refers to when the game shipped. The October 10, 1994 date refers to the actual release date of the game.); Mac OS; NA: June 27, 1995; JP: August 1995; PC-98; JP: September 29, 1995; PlayStation; NA: November 16, 1995; EU: December 1995; Saturn; NA: March 1997; EU: 1997; Game Boy Advance; NA: October 23, 2002; AU: November 13, 2002; EU: November 15, 2002; Tapwave Zodiac; NA: 2004; Xbox 360; WW: May 26, 2010; PlayStation 3; WW: November 20, 2012; Switch, PlayStation 4, Xbox One, Android, iOS; WW: July 26, 2019
- Genre: First-person shooter
- Modes: Single-player, multiplayer

Doom II, also known as Doom II: Hell on Earth, is a 1994 first-person shooter video game developed and published by id Software for MS-DOS. It was released on Mac OS the following year. Whereas the original Doom was initially only available through shareware and mail order, Doom II was the first Doom game released initially in stores.

Doom II features larger levels, new enemies, a new Super Shotgun weapon, and a new power-up. Master Levels for Doom II, an expansion pack with 21 new levels, was released on December 26, 1995. Another expansion, No Rest for the Living, which adds nine extra levels, was developed for the release of the game on Xbox Live Arcade and is also included in the Doom 3: BFG Edition, as part of Doom Classic Complete, and as a free add-on for the 2019 Unity engine port of Doom II. It was also included in the 2024 KEX Engine port.

Doom II received positive reviews for its refining of the original Doom. It has sold more than 1.8 million copies, has earned over $74 million in revenue in the United States, and is considered one of the greatest video games ever made.

Doom II was ported to the Game Boy Advance in 2002, Tapwave Zodiac in 2004, on Xbox Live Arcade in 2010, and on Nintendo Switch, PlayStation 4 and Xbox One in 2019. The release of the Doom source code has facilitated ports to platforms including iOS and other cellphone systems. Doom II was included in the Doom ports for the PlayStation and Sega Saturn in 1995 and 1997.

== Gameplay ==
The Super Shotgun in use

Doom II was not dramatically different from its predecessor. There were no major technological developments, graphical improvements, or substantial gameplay changes. Instead, the development team took advantage of advances in computer hardware since the release of the original game that allowed them to do more with their game engine by making much larger and more intricate levels. The game still consists of the player navigating large nonlinear levels. Each level is infested with demons that can be killed with a variety of weapons that can be picked up throughout the game. Levels are completed by finding an exit, whether it be a switch or a teleporter; the goal is simply to advance to the next area. As with its predecessor, Doom II's levels can be completed in a straightforward fashion. However, because the levels are nonlinear, players can wander off the beaten path, and those who do are often rewarded with bonuses like health pickups and more powerful weapons. Due to the larger and more complicated maps with larger groups of monsters, the game had somewhat higher system requirements than the original.

Rather than the player playing through three episodes as in the first Doom, gameplay takes place over 32 levels (two of which are secret levels that can be accessed from level 15), albeit with interludes for when the story develops. The game is divided into three sections: Outpost, City and Hell. Instead of watching the player's progress on a map (as in the original episodes of Doom), the screens between each level simply show a background (a style carried over to the bonus fourth episode of Doom available in The Ultimate Doom). This also means the player is never forced to lose all of their inventory after completing an episode.

Doom II doubled the number of non-boss monster types and started using bosses from the original Doom as normal level enemies, in addition to adding a new weapon, the Super Shotgun (a very powerful double-barreled shotgun), and a new power-up, the Megasphere.

=== Multiplayer ===
Doom's multiplayer functionality was greatly improved in Doom II, including "out of the box" support for a vastly increased number of dial-up modems. The two-player dial-up connection allowed one player to dial into the other player's computer in order to play either cooperatively or in deathmatch-style combat. There was also local area network (LAN) functionality added, which was improved upon as patches and updates were released. This functionality was later incorporated into the original Doom. As with the original Doom, multiplayer games used to be played using the dial-up or LAN by the internal setup program (setup.exe), through the online service DWANGO or with once-popular programs like Kali and Kahn (using SPX) in Windows 95. Nowadays, there are countless third-party source ports of the Doom engine, such as Odamex, Zandronum, and ZDaemon, that are able to play Doom II multiplayer across different operating systems. The Xbox Live Arcade port of Doom II supports online multiplayer via Xbox Live.

== Plot ==
Immediately following the events in Doom, the player once again assumes the role of Doomguy. After defeating the Spider Mastermind, the marine finds a portal to Earth opened by demons. After returning to Earth, the marine finds that it has also been invaded by the demons, who have killed billions of people.

The humans who survived the attack have developed a plan to build massive spaceships which will carry the remaining survivors into space. Unfortunately, Earth's only ground spaceport has been taken over by the demons, who placed a barrier over it, preventing any ships from leaving. The marine battles hordes of demons and is able to deactivate the force field, allowing the remaining humans to escape. Once all the survivors have escaped Earth, the marine is the only human left on the planet.

Just as he sits down to await death, knowing that he saved humanity, the marine then receives an off-planet transmission from the survivors in orbit, who have managed to find out where the armies of Hell are coming from. The message reveals that the demonic base is in the center of the marine's own hometown. He then fights through the city until he reaches the base, but sees there is no way to stop the invasion on that side. He decides to step into the portal to try deactivating it from the other side, entering Hell.

After fighting through the hordes of Hell, the marine reaches the location of the biggest demon he has ever seen, called the Icon of Sin (Baphomet). He kills the Icon of Sin by firing rockets into its exposed brain. Its death causes devastation in Hell, and the portal to Earth is sealed. The marine wonders where evil people will go when they die now that Hell has been destroyed, and reflects that rebuilding the world will be more fun than saving it as he begins his journey back home.

== Development ==
Most of the levels were designed by Sandy Petersen, with American McGee playing a significant role as well.

The final level, Icon of Sin, contains an easter egg where two of the artists put the severed head of John Romero as the sprite hidden behind the icon on the wall which must be damaged by rocket splash damage three times to win the game. Romero, while playing the level to work on its sound effects, accidentally stumbled upon this in-joke of himself. After realising what his co-workers had done, Romero himself answered by recording his voice saying "To win the game, you must kill me, John Romero", putting it through various filters to distort it, then reverse the recording to create the "demonic chant" spoken by the head upon spotting the player. The photo that was scanned for the "John Romero's head"-sprite was from a Businessweek photo shot in 1994.

One of Sandy Petersen's ideas that never made it to the final game was replacing the Fists weapon with a hand axe.

Advertising for the game was between $3 million and $5 million.

== Releases ==
Doom II was released for DOS on October 10, 1994 (one of the days of the Doomsday rule and exactly ten months after the original) in North America and Europe; distribution was handled by GT Interactive.

In 1995, a port for Mac OS by Lion Entertainment Inc. was released, as well as a port for the PlayStation. An Atari Jaguar port was also announced early in the year, but was never released. Likewise, a 3DO Interactive Multiplayer version was announced to be in development by Art Data Interactive, but it never materialized. In 1997, a port for the Sega Saturn was released.

A port for the Game Boy Advance was released in 2002, for the Tapwave Zodiac in 2004, for Xbox Live Arcade in 2010, and for Nintendo Switch, PlayStation 4 and Xbox One in 2019, with the latter-most platforms (with PlayStation 5 and Xbox Series X/S versions) receiving a further expanded port in 2024 alongside the original Doom.

The release of the Doom source code has facilitated ports to many other platforms, including iOS and other cellphone systems.

In August 2024, Bethesda announced a definitive edition at QuakeCon called Doom + Doom II. The new edition also includes TNT: Evilution, The Plutonia Experiment, Master Levels for Doom II, No Rest for the Living, Sigil (by John Romero), a new deathmatch map pack with 26 maps, and a new episode titled Legacy of Rust. Legacy of Rust was developed by id Software, Nightdive Studios, and MachineGames. The bundle also included in-game mod support across both titles, along with the 2016 "IDKFA" arranged soundtrack for Doom and a brand new "IDKFA" arranged soundtrack for Doom II, both by Andrew Hulshult.

On 10 April 2025, Sigil II was officially added to the Doom + Doom II edition.

== Expansions ==
=== Master Levels for Doom II ===
Master Levels for Doom II is an official expansion pack for Doom II which was released on December 26, 1995, by id Software. The CD contains 20 WAD files created by various authors under contract. There is also a bonus called Maximum Doom consisting of over 3,000 homebrew levels. Romero wrote about the origin of the expansion in 2023. Back in 1995, some retailers were selling disks in stores that simply contained many Doom WADs scraped from the internet. Though the levels were available for free online, many players had slow internet access at the time and so would purchase the disks, which were "selling like hot-cakes". Realising this, id decided to officially license a similar disk by approaching mappers and commissioning them for levels, in addition to the large shareware collection. More broadly, the disk was part of an effort by Romero to diversify id Software's income at a time when much of the team was waiting for the Quake engine to be ready. Reviewer Ed Dawson for PC PowerPlay praised the quality of the levels, but noted the "uniformly medium size" of the commercial levels and the high purchase price for predominantly shareware content.

=== No Rest for the Living ===
No Rest for the Living is an expansion pack developed for the release of Doom II on Xbox Live Arcade for the Xbox 360. It was developed by Nerve Software, under the direction of id Software and was released on May 26, 2010. It consists of eight regular levels and one secret level. It is also included in the 2012 Doom II release from Doom 3: BFG Edition, as part of Doom Classic Complete for the PlayStation Network, and has been released as a free add-on for the 2019 Unity engine port of Doom II. Although no detailed plot information is given, this expansion appears to take place after the main campaign of Doom II. Brandon James, president of Nerve Software, said this expansion was designed to be played on Ultra-Violence difficulty, contains "a plethora of secrets to find", and "is geared toward a more hardcore experience".

=== Legacy of Rust ===
Legacy of Rust was developed by id Software, Nightdive Studios, and MachineGames. Released on August 8, 2024, Legacy of Rust is the first official episode since Doom II to feature brand-new enemies/weapons. The new episode is divided into two chapters, "The Vulcan Abyss" and "Counterfeit Eden", which contain a combined total of 16 maps.

== Reception ==
=== Critical reception ===
Reception

Aggregate score
Aggregator	Score
Metacritic	PC: 83/100; GBA: 77/100; X360: 77/100

Review scores
Publication	Score
AllGame	4/5 (DOS); 4/5 (Macintosh)
GameSpot	8.5 /10 (PC)
GameSpy	4.5/5 (GBA)
Next Generation	3/5
PC PowerPlay	3/10 (Master Levels)
MacUser	4/5
Entertainment Weekly	A

The reception of Doom II was positive, with reviewers saying it refined everything that made the original Doom good. The game was reviewed in 1995 in Dragon #216 by David "Zeb" Cook in the "Eye of the Monitor" column, who stated that, "if mindless but intense carnage is what you want, you'll get your money's worth. It's just not a must-have, keep-on-the-hard-drive-forever game. If you need to have more Doom, get this."

Writer/game designer Chris Crawford used the level "Barrels O' Fun" to illustrate a point about death in video games, explaining he chose the level as his example because it is "one of the most complex and sophisticated challenges in one of the very best games of the 1990s".

Next Generation reviewed the PC version of the game, rating it three stars out of five, and stated that "Now that the first person interface has become the design of choice for the entire industry, Id will need to find new innovations, or it will quickly find it's playing catch-up in its own game niche."

=== Awards ===
Doom II won the Origins Award for Best Fantasy or Science fiction Computer Game of 1994.

=== Sales ===
According to David Kushner in Masters of Doom, id Software shipped 600,000 units of Doom II to stores in preparation for its launch. This initial shipment sold out within a month on shelves, despite its being expected to last for three months. Pre-orders for the game were so massive that it was difficult to buy from a store. The game products were displayed on pallets rather than shelves. The game was the United States' highest-selling software product of 1994, and sold more than 1.2 million copies within a year. It placed 10th for 1996, with 322,671 units sold and $12.6 million earned in the region that year alone. According to PC Data, which tracked sales in the United States, Doom II sold 1.81 million units and earned $74.7 million in revenue in the United States. This led PC Data to declare it the country's third-best-selling computer game for the period between January 1993 and April 1998. Its revenues in that country ultimately reached $80 million, while those in Europe reached $20 million. Of the latter figure, Kushner wrote that "30 percent [...] came from Germany—a country that had banned the game from its shelves."

In Australia, the game sold 10,000 copies in the first two days of its release.

== Legacy ==
In 2022, John Romero created a new level called "One Humanity" for the game to raise money for the Ukrainian Red Cross, and the United Nations Central Emergency Response Fund following the outbreak of the 2022 Russian invasion of Ukraine. By March 2022, the new level had raised more than $29,000.
