= Andrew Hulshult =

American video game composer (born 1988)

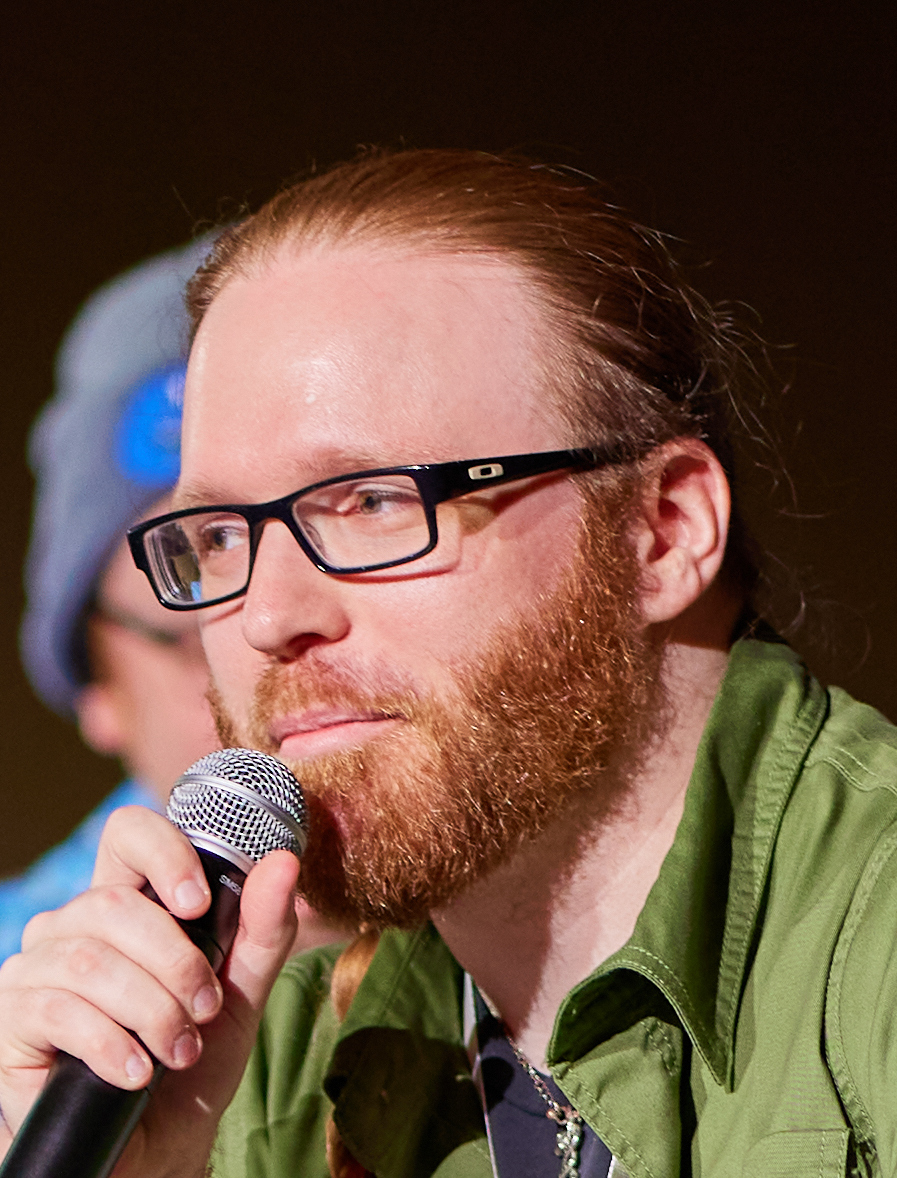
- Hulshult at QuakeCon 2023

Background information
- Born: February 14, 1988 (age 38)
- Genres: Video game music, Heavy metal music
- Occupations: Composer, sound designer
- Instruments: Guitar, synthesizer
- Years active: 2010–present
- Website: https://www.hulshult.com/

Andrew Hulshult (born 14 February 1988) is an American video game music composer and sound designer. He is best known for his work with New Blood Interactive as well as his scores for several first-person shooters, such as Dusk, Quake Champions, and Doom Eternal.

== Career ==
Hulshult is based in Dallas, Texas, where he has lived since childhood. He started in the industry composing for a Duke Nukem 3D remake that would eventually be canceled. Interceptor Entertainment CEO Frederik Schreiber wanted a heavy metal soundtrack for the game and described Hulshult's demos as "by far the best they had received." That relationship eventually led to Hulshult scoring the 2013 remake of Rise of the Triad. After Interceptor merged with 3D Realms, he continued with the company on several 3D Realms releases including Bombshell and Rad Rodgers.

Hulshult independently created remakes for classic video game tracks from games such as Quake II and Doom, the latter of which was attached to the Brutal Doom mod by Marcos "Sergeant_Mark_IV" Abenante. The mod won the IGN SXSW 2017 award for "Fan Creation of the Year", and Hulshult accepted for Sergeant_Mark_IV, who wasn't able to attend.

Hulshult also continued his association with Rise of the Triad collaborator Dave Oshry, who became CEO of New Blood Interactive. The company published Dusk and later Amid Evil, both of which featured scores composed by Hulshult.

In July 2018, Bethesda announced that a new in-game soundtrack for Quake Champions had been made by "the sweet metal Viking Andrew Hulshult." The update went live a few weeks later.

In November 2018, the indie game Prodeus was announced, and by the March 2019 Kickstarter campaign Hulshult had been brought on for the soundtrack.

In an August 2020 interview with Bethesda Germany, Doom Eternal directors Marty Stratton and Hugo Martin disclosed that they had selected local Texas artists Andrew Hulshult and David Levy as composers for The Ancient Gods DLC, with Hulshult having been frequently requested by fans. Hulshult confirmed the announcement.

In April 2023, Hulshult was confirmed to be scoring the film Iron Lung. This is the first film soundtrack that he worked on. The full Original Motion Picture Soundtrack was released on January 26, 2026.

== Works ==
Video Games

Year	Title	Notes
2011	Duke Nukem 3D: Reloaded (Canceled)	With Marcin Przybyłowicz
2013	Rise of the Triad	Arrangements of Bobby Prince and Lee Jackson's soundtrack
2014	3D Realms Anthology	Arrangements of music from various 3D Realms games.
2016	Brutal Doom	Unofficial mod addon
2016	Bombshell	
2018	Rad Rodgers	
2018	Dusk	
2019	Amid Evil	
2020	Nightmare Reaper	
2020	Wrath: Aeon of Ruin	With Bjørn Jacobsen
2020	Prodeus	With James Paddock
2020–2021	Doom Eternal	The Ancient Gods campaign expansion, composed with David Levy
2021	Dusk '82	Chiptune soundtrack
2022	Quake Champions	With Chris Vrenna
2024	Doom + Doom II	Updated versions of original soundtracks (see IDKFA, below)
2025	Heretic + Hexen	Updated versions of original soundtracks
2025	Tokyo Underground Killer	

Film

Year	Title	Director
2026	Iron Lung	Mark Fischbach

Albums

Year	Title
2014	3D Realms Soundtrack Re-Rockestrated
2015	Rise of the Triad Official Soundtrack
2016	Bombshell Official Soundtrack
2016	IDKFA
2016	Rad Rodgers 16-Bit Soundtrack
2018	Dusk (Original Game Soundtrack)
2019	Amid Evil Soundtrack
2020	Prodeus Original Game Soundtrack
2021	Dusk '82 Original Game Soundtrack
2022	Nightmare Reaper (Original Game Soundtrack)
2023	Amid Evil: The Black Labyrinth (Original Game Soundtrack)
2025	Tome of Power (Official Heretic + Hexen Game Soundtrack)
2025	Tokyo Underground Killer (Official Game Soundtrack)
2026	Iron Lung (Original Motion Picture Soundtrack)
