= David Szymanski =

American video game developer (born 1989)

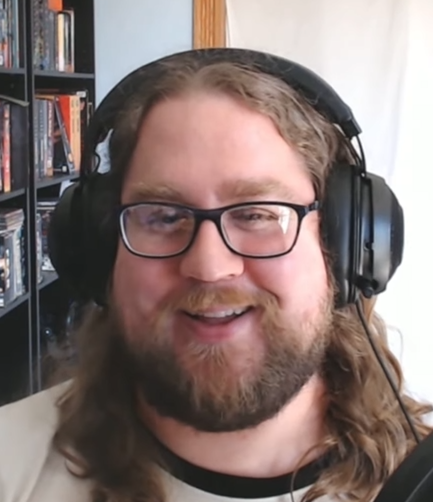
- Szymanski in 2025
- Born: December 23, 1989 (age 36); United States
- Occupation: Video game developer
- Notable work: Dusk (2018); Iron Lung (2022); Gloomwood (2022)

David Szymanski (/səˈmæn.skiː/ sə-MAN-skee; Polish pronunciation: [ʂɨˈmaɲ.ski]; born December 23, 1989) is an American video game developer. He is best known for having developed the games Dusk, Iron Lung, and Gloomwood.

== Life and career ==
Video of a "visual prototype" Szymanski was working on before he started to develop Dusk

David Szymanski was born on December 23, 1989. (Note: Szymanski, David (December 23, 2025). "I am 36 years old today!". Bluesky.) He is the brother of video game developers John and Evan Szymanski, known for developing My Friendly Neighborhood. He is half Polish.

Under the username "jefequeso", David began to release games on Itch.io, Game Jolt, and Steam in 2014, including the freeware horror game Fingerbones and his first commercial horror game The Moon Sliver.

On December 10, 2018, David released Dusk, a retro-style first-person shooter game. For Dusk, Szymanski has been credited by SUPERJUMP with "single-handedly revitalizing the boomer-shooter genre". He then released Iron Lung on March 10, 2022, a submarine simulation horror game in which players navigate an ocean of blood on a moon. Sales increased after the Titan submersible implosion, which disconcerted Szymanski. He faced criticism online for increasing the price of the game by two dollars, to which he told those complaining to "go pirate it or something". Sales of the game dropped after the price adjustment. On April 21, 2023, YouTuber Markiplier announced that he would be directing a film based on Iron Lung. Szymanski had a cameo in the film.

Szymanski released Squirrel Stapler in September 2023, followed by The Pony Factory in 2024. Both had originally been released as part of the Dread X Collection and take place in the same world, while the latter was inspired by Jacqueline Ess: Her Will And Testament, a short story by Clive Barker. In January 2025, he released Butcher's Creek, a first-person horror game about a man going to the titular Butcher's Creek on a quest to collect snuff films on VHS. Szymanski published Secret Agent Wizard Boy and the International Crime Syndicate, developed by brothers John and Evan Szymanski, which was released as early access on March 6, 2025. Szymanski worked with Dillon Rogers in developing Gloomwood, a stealth survival horror game published by New Blood Interactive.
