= Hands of Necromancy =

2022 video game

- Developer: Rising Fire Games
- Publisher: Fulqrum Publishing
- Producer: Emmanuel Frechou
- Composer: Luke Jansen
- Engine: GZDoom
- Platforms: Windows, macOS, Linux
- Release: June 20, 2022
- Genres: First-person shooter, Metroidvania, Fantasy
- Modes: Single-player, multiplayer

Hands of Necromancy is a 2022 first-person shooter video game, developed by Rising Fire Games (Note: Formerly known as Frechou Games) and published by Fulqrum Publishing. It was built using GZDoom, a modern source port of the Doom engine, and released for Windows, macOS, and Linux. For its retro shooter mechanics, fantasy setting, and metroidvania-style exploration, the game has been described as a spiritual successor to Heretic (1994) and Hexen: Beyond Heretic (1995).

== Gameplay ==
The player assumes the role of a necromancer, wielding a diverse arsenal of weapons as well as offensive and utility spells to combat foes and interact with the environment. The main character can also transform into various creatures, such as a golem to shatter obstacles or a serpent to swim, each of which bestows certain skills necessary for advancement.

Hands of Necromancy incorporates metroidvania-style gameplay, requiring players to acquire new abilities in order to access previously unreachable areas. The game features three hub worlds, each consisting of numerous interconnected maps that encourage backtracking and exploration to uncover new paths and overcome challenges.

== Development ==
The game was built using GZDoom, a modern source port of the Doom engine that adds advanced rendering, scripting, and modding capabilities. The project was developed primarily by veteran modders, among them members of the Bloom Team, creators of the Bloom mod. Many of its mechanics and visual design drew inspiration from Raven Software’s Heretic and Hexen: Beyond Heretic, particularly in its focus on fantasy themes, hub-based progression, and magical combat. The soundtrack was composed by Australian musician Luke Jansen. The source code was later released on GitHub under the GNU General Public License v3 (GPLv3).

== Reception ==
Kotaku described Hands of Necromancy as "a game so good it could have been Hexen III", praising its hub-based level design as "top-notch" and its unique ability to transform into enemies as "such a splendid idea". The review noted it was inspired by Heretic and Hexen without being beholden to them, and concluded it could stand alongside Raven Software's mid-90s fantasy shooters, calling HON Team "a name to follow".

PCGamesN noted that "thankfully there are some developers who are still willing to try and crack the fantasy nut", praising the game's magic system, distinct monster transformations, and the ability to raise fallen foes to fight alongside the player. Jot Down remarked that Hands of Necromancy “does not limit itself to being a common clone and manages to cultivate a personality of its own".

AnaitGames stated that the game "without great fanfare manages to surprise through the solidity and spontaneity of its design", and concluded that "many big-budget shooters could benefit from the audacity and innocence of Hands of Necromancy".

== Legacy ==
In September 2024, Hands of Necromancy II was released, introducing two playable characters with distinct weapons, spells, and transformations. Its soundtrack was composed by Spanish musician ASCIIMOV (Oscar Martín).

== See also ==
- Amid Evil - A retro-style first-person shooter, also described as a spiritual successor to Heretic and Hexen.
