= Amid Evil =

2019 video game

- Developer: Indefatigable
- Publisher: New Blood Interactive
- Directors: Leon Zawada; Simon Rance
- Producer: Dave Oshry
- Designers: Leon Zawada; Simon Rance; Daniel Hedjazi
- Programmer: Leon Zawada
- Artists: Simon Rance; Chris Pollitt
- Composer: Andrew Hulshult
- Engine: Unreal Engine 4
- Platform: Microsoft Windows
- Release: Microsoft Windows; June 20, 2019
- Genre: First-person shooter
- Mode: Single-player

Amid Evil is a first-person shooter video game developed by Indefatigable and published by New Blood Interactive. The game's dark fantasy theme, action-oriented gameplay, and retro-inspired visual elements have earned it frequent descriptions as a spiritual successor to 1994's Heretic and 1995's Hexen.

== Plot ==
In the ancient past, a mysterious and powerful "Evil Force" appeared and corrupted the sacred lands of the known realms. Though many heroes have tried to defeat the Evil Force, none have succeeded. The protagonist, known only as "the Champion", is the first to overcome the trial of the Black Labyrinth and win the right to carry a holy battle axe. Possessing the powerful relic grants the wielder passage to the higher planes. As the Champion travels to an inter-dimensional gateway, the voices of ancient deities warn of the great power of the Evil Force and implore the Champion to cleanse the sacred lands.

== Gameplay ==
Amid Evil borrows heavily from 90s first-person shooters Unreal, Doom, Heretic, Hexen, and Quake. Similar to most first-person shooter games of that era, Amid Evil is structured as a progression of levels, each of which featuring a complex, non-linear structure with progression often requiring the player to seek out keys to unlock doors. The level design in Amid Evil promotes exploration, with most levels containing several hidden "secrets" where the player can find power-ups, as well as lore (plot exposition) in the form of inscriptions on walls or floors. Levels are grouped into episodes, with the levels in each episode sharing a unique theme. Episodes consist of four levels each, the last of which being a boss battle. Like Quake, players start in a hub level that allows episode (and difficulty) selection by walking through various portals.

As in Heretic, the player must battle enemies using an array of magical weapons. In addition to the Axe of the Black Labyrinth, there are six ranged weapons in the game, each using one of four types of mana. The player must find both the weapons and the mana in the game world. The weapons have varied effectiveness against each of the enemy types, encouraging the player to modify their strategy depending on the situation. In addition to picking up mana, the player may absorb the souls of fallen enemies. As the player accumulates enough souls, they enter "soul mode" which activates alternative fire modes for all weapons, and greatly increases their power for a short time.

As the player takes damage from enemies, the player loses health points. To replenish health points the player must pick up "blood orbs" scattered throughout the levels. There are also rare power-ups that grant temporary abilities such as flight, invisibility, or a torch to illuminate darkened areas.

In addition to the single-player campaign, Amid Evil features a "Hordes of Evil" survival mode where the player can face off against endless waves of enemies in battle arenas.

== Development ==
Developers Leon Zawada and Simon Rance, friends since childhood, began their career in game development with Doom mods, most notably a Rise of the Triad total conversion called Return of the Triad. The two started Amid Evil as a Doom mod in 1997. Though that game would never be completed, the concepts that they developed for it evolved over time and were incorporated into the new incarnation. They knew they wanted to make a "fantasy shooter"—a game with a medieval magic theme, but featuring ranged weapons as the main weapons.

Zawada and Rance eventually worked together on the 2013 Rise of the Triad remake, where they met other game developers that would help them form Indefatigable. Amid Evil was to be the new company's first project.

Lighting effects on the Axe of the Black Labyrinth, showing the use of a normal mapped sprite

Before launching development of Amid Evil for Indefatigable, Rance had created an Unreal Engine 4 demo showcasing a weapon rendered as a normal mapped sprite. He described the idea as "the thing that got [the game] going." The distinctive visual style established the art direction of Amid Evil, described by the developers as a "mix [of] old-school and new-school graphics techniques." "The first-person weapons and pickups are actually sprites with individual frames using masked materials, complete with normal, roughness, and metalness maps. They’re then baked with perspective from hi-poly 3D meshes," a workflow unique to Amid Evil. Rance described applying the same technique to environments, "where instead of making a giant texture we'd just make a small [resolution] texture but still apply a normal map to it, so everything looks shaded correctly but it's got the same pixely 1995 aesthetic as the old games. So it's old-looking but it's brought into the future; it's not just mimicked."

In order to make a 1990s game for a modern audience, the developers added to the retro first-person shooter formula. For example, enemy AI is much more dynamic. Rather than attacking the player from a single position, enemies can rush the player, jump from platforms, and give chase. Enemies have the ability to dodge or reflect attacks, and flank, which adds depth. The level design, while more complex than typical modern titles, is not maze-like so as to allow constant progression. Also weapons were given an alternate "soul mode" to add to the variety.

== Release ==
Amid Evil was announced on October 25, 2017. Like Dusk before it, New Blood chose to publish the game using the early access model, initially releasing the game with a fully functional but incomplete single-player campaign, along with a survival mode.

Amid Evil was released to Steam Early Access on March 12, 2018, featuring the first three of seven episodes, "Astral Equinox", "Domain of the Sentinels", and "The Sacred Path." Additional episodes followed in a regular cadence; "The Solar Solstice" was released on May 18, 2018, "The Forges" was released on September 21, 2018, "The Arcane Expanse" was released on February 7, 2019, and "The Void" was released on June 20, 2019.

The release of the final episode of the game coincided with Amid Evil leaving early access for a full release, which included updates to the previous episodes such as additional lore, more enemy variety, environmental tweaks, and weapon balancing.

The first DLC, Ancient Alpha Builds, was released on November 22, 2019. Rather than new content for the main game, the DLC offered 5 earlier versions of the game from various stages of development. At the same time, ray tracing support with RTX was announced.

A release for Linux has been confirmed as planned.

=== Prequel expansion ===
Amid Evil: The Black Labyrinth was announced with a teaser trailer on September 6, 2020.

== Reception ==
Reception

Aggregate score
Aggregator	Score
Metacritic	85/100

Review scores
Publication	Score
Destructoid	8.5/10
GameRevolution	4/5
Hardcore Gamer	4.5/5
PC Gamer (US)	86/100
PC Invasion	9/10

The early access release of Amid Evil did receive press coverage, though nearly all outlets opted to provide a first impressions summary rather than a full review. In one such example, PC Gamer UK offered the summation, "A truly weird (and beautiful) fantasy setting lays the groundwork for a worthy ode to Heretic." Reviewers typically praised the weapon and level designs, while some criticized the enemy design and others criticized glitches in the pre-release version.

The full release of Amid Evil received "generally favorable" reviews from critics, according to review aggregator website Metacritic. Reviewers praised the variety of weapons and environments, comparing the game favorably to Unreal and Quake.

== See also ==
- Hands of Necromancy: A retro-style first-person shooter built on GZDoom, also described as a spiritual successor to Heretic and Hexen.
