= Faith: The Unholy Trinity =

Horror video game series

- Developer: Airdorf Games
- Publisher: New Blood Interactive
- Engine: GameMaker
- Platforms: Windows, Nintendo Switch
- Release: Chapter 1; October 4, 2017; Chapter 2; February 22, 2019; Chapter 3; October 21, 2022; Faith: The Unholy Trinity; October 21, 2022 (PC); October 10, 2024 (Switch); October 23, 2025 (Xbox); April 9, 2026 (Playstation)
- Genres: Survival horror Religious horror
- Mode: Single-player

Faith: The Unholy Trinity is a series of Christian survival horror video games developed by Airdorf Games for Windows. The trinity consists of three chapters; the first two were self-published in October 2017 and February 2019 respectively. The third was published by New Blood Interactive in October 2022 as part of a compilation of the chapters.

Inspired by the Satanic panic of the 1980s to 1990s, Faith depicts a priest named John Ward and his conflicts with demons and a satanic cult. The game uses retro graphics similar to that of an Apple II or Atari 2600.

Faith received positive reviews, with critics praising the trinity for its unique visual style, atmospheric storytelling, and the ability to evoke the nostalgic feel of classic horror games.

== Gameplay ==
Faith: The Unholy Trinity has the player control a priest. Gameplay is simple; the priest must explore an area and hold out a cross to interact with objects and solve puzzles. Some objects produce written notes (symbolized as the object being exorcised) that provide backstory and exposition. The cross is also used to ward off attacking demons. It is the priest's only means of defense, who is slow at movement and will be killed otherwise.

== Plot ==
=== Chapter I ===
On September 21, 1987, Catholic priest John Ward returns to the Martin residence in rural Sterling, Connecticut, to complete the exorcism of 17-year-old Amy Martin, though the mission has not been approved by the Holy See. One year earlier, Amy killed her parents and John's superior, Father Allred, during the exorcism ritual. While approaching the house through the surrounding woods, he is stalked by a pale humanoid monster that he repels with his cross. Entering the house, John battles Amy in the attic. He fails to finish the exorcism, and she throws herself out of a window, fleeing into the woods. John then finds a gun with a single bullet.

Shooting any of five specific targets concludes the chapter and results in a different ending. Killing Amy causes John to be arrested for murder and accused of impersonating a priest. Shooting a shadowy figure near a shed ends with John being ambushed by the pale monster. Shooting a deer causes John to be killed by another deer. Shooting a fox corpse left at an apparent ritual site ends with John being captured by cultists. Lastly, shooting the pale monster (which appears near the car if none of the aforementioned targets are shot) causes it to retreat along the road before it is then run over by a passing truck. The monster's remains baffle authorities and are reported as a Chupacabra, and John comments that though he does not know how to explain what happened at the Martin house, he can have faith that he did the right thing.

=== Chapter II prologue ===
Seemingly taking place after the fifth ending of Chapter I, Chapter II's prologue sees John crash his car into an oncoming truck driven by a cultist (named in the game as "Thralls"). Afterwards, John sees a rather unsettling scarecrow, which grows a hole after John exorcises a demon in the nearby cornfield. Afterwards, John finds a dead dog and six graves as well as a statue of Saint William. He eventually finds a derelict church. Going into it he finds a note talking about a nun named "Sister Bell" and her history with the church. He also discovers another demon and exorcises it too, learning more about Bell's strange behavior with the church's orphans. As he continues to investigate the ruined church, he exorcises various objects, learning more about Sister Bell along the way, which seems to break some sort of invisible seal on the staircase leading to the church's basement. Going down, it is pitch black and John finds a flashlight. He defeats yet another demon (which will later be encountered in Chapter II proper) before leaving the basement and going back up.

There are two endings to this chapter, the first simply requires John to go up after leaving the basement. There he sees two purple children holding hands before a cloaked old woman appears and yells "HERE I AM!". The second ending requires John to burn the scarecrow from before and turn into a demon himself. Doing so, he meets the same lady who screams at him to "GET OUT!".

=== Chapter II ===
The main character in Chapter II, Father John Ward, walking through the forest

A priest, Father Garcia, attempts to exorcise a teenager he is holding captive named Michael Davies, who is revealed to be the pale monster from Chapter I. Michael breaks free from his restraints, and escapes after killing a passerby.

John Ward, while suffering a crisis of faith due to the events at the Martin house, travels to Gallup Cemetery in Connecticut to investigate strange activity. He is chased across the cemetery and beyond by demonic creatures, including Amy Martin, who afflicts him with terrifying visions and tortures, before eventually finding a hidden cultist sanctuary in the sewers. After he enters the inner sanctum and is attacked by the cloaked old woman from the Prologue, Father Garcia appears and asks for John's help to defeat her by reciting the 91st Psalm. Following a demonic onslaught (where Father Garcia may die if not protected), the woman transforms into a horrifying demon. John then awakens in his bed, revealing the events to be a dream. He reads a letter from Father Garcia, asking him to help stop the imminent summoning of a powerful demon.

=== Chapter III ===
On October 28, three days until the "Profane Sabbath", John receives a letter from Father Garcia asking him to search the now-abandoned clinic where Amy Martin worked as a volunteer. Inside, he is attacked by a mangled humanoid creature, knocked unconscious, and strapped to a gurney. John escapes the creature and is freed by a police officer. As they attempt to leave, the creature attacks again and is defeated. John may leave at this point, or he can return to the clinic's basement and solve a puzzle to fight a secret boss in the form of the demonic Mother and her children.

On October 29, two days until the Profane Sabbath, John goes to an apartment building in New Haven to assist a woman named Lisa, his childhood friend, who had been sending him letters asking for help. He finds the apartment building empty, but learns that it is a base of operations for the cult and a possible summoning site for Malphas. After undoing a magical seal preventing him from entering Lisa's room, he finds that she has been possessed by a demon named Alu. John fights and banishes Alu, though Lisa can die in the process; if she does not, she informs John that Gary Miller is the leader of the cult and asks John to stop him. If the player fulfills certain conditions, they will unlock a second secret boss named Tiffany, also known as the Daughter. She was a member of the cult who renounced Gary's rule and attempted to become a demonic vessel on her own, but was rejected. They will also unlock a secret floor of the apartment building, revealing that an apartment tenant had been collecting bodies, possibly to revive their dead son.

On October 30, one day until the Profane Sabbath, Father Garcia asks John to investigate a nearby daycare center where children have been acting strangely, believing that it is somehow connected to Gary's cult. John finds the daycare surrounded by police, but manages to sneak in. The children are gone, but he finds drawings suggesting influence by Gary's cult, and a secret passage beneath the school. The passage leads to an extensive cult stronghold, filled with cultists who have been transformed into demonic creatures. As he explores the stronghold, John is ambushed by Gary and injected with a hallucinogenic substance before awakening deeper in the stronghold. Here, John may summon the third secret boss, the Unholy Spirit, who takes the form of a floating head; John can either avoid it as it stalks him or destroy it. John eventually enters the heart of the stronghold and confronts Gary himself, who reveals that his true goal is to summon the Antichrist. John and Gary fight, with John emerging victorious. Father Garcia arrives with a shotgun and forces Gary to retreat. John and Garcia pursue him, finding the entrance to the Crucible, the source of the cult's power, and a broken holy seal.

Throughout Chapter III, John experiences nightmares related to his first exorcism. It is revealed that John, in a desperate prayer to God, made a deal with a white figure whom he assumed was the Lord, allowing him to escape the house safely, leaving Amy possessed.

==== Endings ====
If the player did not defeat all three secret Unholy Trinity bosses (the Mother, the Daughter, and the Unholy Spirit), John and Garcia find the Crucible sealed. John empowers the seal, sealing Gary and the demons inside the Crucible. Father Garcia asks John to join him as an apprentice so that he may train him to fight Gary when he inevitably returns, to which John expresses doubt in his own abilities. This ending has two variants based on John's performance. If John saved Lisa, Garcia reassures John and convinces him to join; if John failed to save Lisa, Garcia forces him to join at gunpoint.

If the player defeated the Unholy Trinity, the seal protecting the Crucible is removed. John enters it and finds Gary, now horrifically deformed, in front of a human skeleton. He explains that the skeleton is his mother, who attempted to complete the Profane Sabbath but failed. Gary attacks John once again, this time fusing with another demon (implied to be Malphas) and his mother's body to form a powerful monster. John defeats this demon using his crucifix and burns the mother's body. Amy Martin appears, and Gary receives her reverently, as she is the intended vessel for the Profane Sabbath. However, the demon possessing Amy calls him a failure for failing to complete the ritual and drags him into Hell. Amy's soul then returns, and John apologizes to Amy for running away and not being able to save her; she forgives him, and asks him to complete the exorcism, allowing her to ascend to Heaven, finally granting her eternal rest. His faith in the Lord now restored, John leaves the daycare center, finding the rest of the cult to have died in a shootout with the police. He may choose to learn the art of demon hunting with Father Garcia, or leave town with Lisa and attempt to live a normal life.

A third ending is possible if John returns home on the third night before entering the cult's underground stronghold. If he does so, the Profane Sabbath occurs without hindrance, and he is ambushed at his home by the cultists and Amy. He finds himself back in the Martin household, now appearing decrepit on the inside, matching the appearance it always appeared to have on the outside, before finding a ritual circle and kneeling in it; Amy and Michael Davies appear and hold him in place while a giant hand drags him away. The house is shown to have disappeared, and the screen goes black, showing the words "damnatio memoriae".

== Development ==
Faith is styled after 8-bit computer games of the early 1980s, such as the ones found on the Atari 2600 console or Apple II computer (most notably the 1985 remake of the Oregon Trail). Though most of the game is presented in an isometric, low-framerate display, several rotoscoped cutscenes are used throughout each chapter. Additionally, much of the dialogue is presented through 80s-era synthesized speech (in particular, SAM), with some voice lines and sound effects taken from real electronic voice phenomena (EVPs) and exorcisms (one fight uses actual recordings of the Exorcism of Anneliese Michel) processed through those same programs. The music is a combination of original music and pre-existing pieces, such as Ludwig van Beethoven's Moonlight Sonata and Erik Satie's Gnossiennes, with the game's main menu theme being Eventide by William Henry Monk.

Faith's story is inspired by the Satanic panic of the 1980s–90s, where allegations of physical and sexual abuse in the name of Satan were made against teachers, schools, tabletop role-playing games, toy companies, heavy metal musicians, and television and film companies. It also takes influence from The Exorcist franchise, which itself took inspiration from real life events. The initial loading message was inspired by the Commodore 64 boot screen.

== Release ==
The first chapter was released on itch.io on October 4, 2017. The second chapter was released on February 22, 2019. In November 2019, developer Airdorf Games and publisher New Blood Interactive announced Faith: The Unholy Trinity, a compilation of the first two chapters alongside the newest release, the third chapter. At the same time, the first chapter was released on Steam as a demo for The Unholy Trinity. The Unholy Trinity was released for Windows via itch.io and Steam on October 21, 2022, and includes new features such as alternate screen filters and a "turbo" mode which increases the game speed. Console versions were mentioned alongside Windows in the announcement for The Unholy Trinity, with the Nintendo Switch version release on October 10, 2024. A demo, consisting of the cemetery from the second chapter, was released for Xbox One and Xbox Series X/S on September 9, 2025. The full game released for Xbox on October 23, 2025. On January 1, 2024, pre-production began for the fourth chapter.

== Reception ==
Reception

Aggregate score
Aggregator	Score
OpenCritic	90% recommend

Review scores
Publication	Score
Nintendo Life	8/10
Slant Magazine	4.5/5

Reception for Faith has been positive. OpenCritic determined that 90% of critics recommended the game. Writing for Rock Paper Shotgun, Noa Smith called the game "one of those little treasures you stumble across on your monthly horror binge". Jef Rouner of the San Francisco Chronicle's Datebook praised the use of retro graphics, saying that "The sudden acceleration into full motion from jerky two-frame animation is jarring enough for a jump scare but still empty enough that players are forced to ask what it is that is attacking them." It was included in IGN's "18 Best Horror Games of 2017".

== Film adaptation ==
On December 9, 2024, it was announced that a film adaptation based on the game was in development, with Brandon Salisbury to direct. Others involved in the project include Steve Barton and George Demick as executive producers, and John Esposito as screenwriter.

On March 26, 2026, Variety announced that Alanah Pearce had joined the project as screenwriter and producer, through her recently-launched production company Charred Pictures. Additionally, the game's developer Mason Smith, credited as Airdorf Games, was confirmed as an executive producer.
