= Butcher's Creek =

2025 video game

- Developer: David Szymanski
- Publisher: David Szymanski
- Engine: Unity
- Platform: Windows
- Release: January 23, 2025
- Genres: Survival horror; Melee
- Mode: Single-player

Butcher's Creek is a 2025 first-person melee survival horror game developed and published by David Szymanski. The player controls an unnamed loner on a search for videotapes, which leads him to an abandoned cabin near the titular town of Butcher's Creek, Pennsylvania. The game is heavily inspired by the horror games Manhunt (2003) and Condemned: Criminal Origins (2005). The game was released for Windows on January 23, 2025.

== Gameplay ==
Butcher's Creek takes place in the autumn of 1993, with the player controlling an unnamed loner who is obsessed with cinematic gore, and is seeking "authentic snuff videotapes", and attempts to make contact with the mysterious group that produces them, but no one answers. During his quest, he eventually arrives at an abandoned cabin near the fictional town of Butcher's Creek, Pennsylvania, in a remote, decaying corner of the Appalachian Forest.

He is then knocked unconscious by a mysterious antagonist who swings a rusty shovel into the back of his head, and is captured and set upon a "gang of sadistic killers". The player then must fight for survival by using various melee weapons, such as box cutters and hammers, to defend himself against the killers, and uses a camera to document the violence, while also unveiling mysterious cult activities.

== Release ==
On July 21, 2023, the game was announced on Steam, along with screenshots from the game. The pre-release gameplay trailer was released on August 28, 2024, with the demo of game being released on October 11 of that year. The full game was officially released on Steam on January 23, 2025.

== Reception ==
Dominic Tarason of PC Gamer says Butcher's Creek is "the sort of short, low-fi and pointedly horrible experience that [Szymanski] is increasingly known for." Tarason also states that the "horror adventures of movie length or less" are "long enough to get under your skin and have you turning them over in your head for a while." Sean Shuman of Horror Geek Life rated the game with 3.5 out of 5 stars, saying that while it "may not have met all my (admittedly unfair) expectations", he admits that "it'll remind me that there's still a devoted audience for the kind of edgy and unpleasant terror seemingly left behind in the 2000s."

== Plot ==
The game is set in autumn 1993 in a remote corner of the Appalachian Forest near the fictional town of Butcher's Creek, Pennsylvania. The player controls an unnamed, troubled loner (later identified in cult lore as the Tooth Sower), a degenerate obsessed with cinematic gore and snuff films. Drawn by rumors of authentic snuff videotapes produced by a mysterious group, he ventures to an abandoned cabin and sawmill complex seeking contact with the producers. Finding the site deserted, he explores deeper into the derelict structures and surrounding woods, discovering traces of extreme violence such as bloodstains and bone fragments.

He is soon ambushed from behind with a rusty shovel, knocked unconscious, stripped of his clothing and possessions, and captured by a gang of sadistic killers and torturers who live in the decaying compound. Upon waking, he finds himself imprisoned and slated to become the next victim in their snuff films. Escaping his initial confines with a scavenged box cutter, he arms himself with improvised melee weapons such as hammers, knives, pipes, pliers, boards, and other rusted tools—and begins a brutal fight for survival, carving his way through the cultists in gory, close-quarters combat.

As the protagonist progresses through the gore filled industrial mazes and underground lairs, he uncovers the cult's lore through notes and writings. The killers form a cult dedicated to producing snuff films not solely for pleasure but as ritual offerings to appease and imprison an eldritch entity known as the Watcher (sometimes referred to in context with phrases like "the Watcher is Watching"). The cult views the Watcher as an overwhelmingly evil cosmic force—more malevolent than Hell itself—whose release would bring about apocalyptic ruin. By feeding it violence and suffering captured on videotape, they believe they are containing its influence.

Cult prophecies describe the arrival of the Tooth Sower, a figure who "arrives as meat but hides the heart of a butcher." This prophesied individual would sow doubt within the cult (exemplified by internal notes about a "Traitorous Prophet" spreading weakness), destroy the group, and enable the Watcher's escape through a ritual called the Crimson Communion. The protagonist's own actions and reactions—photographing gruesome murder scenes with evident enthusiasm and reveling in the violence—reveal his alignment with this role. He is no innocent victim but a kindred spirit to the cultists, distinguished mainly by his superior capacity for brutality and genuine affinity for the depravity.

The narrative culminates as the protagonist fights through a final gauntlet (armed with an exceptionally powerful pickaxe) and confronts the Watcher directly. In a perverse union known as the Crimson Communion, the entity recognizes the Tooth Sower's profound embrace of its "gospel of pain and depravity." The Watcher, taken aback by the protagonist's reciprocal enthusiasm (noted narratively as the entity not knowing "that the Tooth Sower would love it back"), is empowered by this connection. This event appears to shatter the cult's containment, releasing the Watcher and ushering in an apocalyptic end.
