= Iron Lung (film) =

2026 sci-fi horror film by Mark Fischbach

- Theatrical release poster
- Directed by: Mark "Markiplier" Fischbach
- Written by: Mark "Markiplier" Fischbach
- Based on: Iron Lung by David Szymanski
- Produced by: Mark "Markiplier" Fischbach; Will Hyde; Jeff Guerrero
- Starring: Mark "Markiplier" Fischbach; Caroline Kaplan; Troy Baker; Elsie Lovelock; Elle LaMont; Mick Lauer; Seán McLoughlin; Isaac McKee
- Cinematography: Philip Roy
- Edited by: Mark "Markiplier" Fischbach
- Music by: Andrew Hulshult
- Production companies: Markiplier Studios
- Distributed by: Markiplier Studios
- Release date: January 30, 2026
- Running time: 125 minutes
- Country: United States
- Language: English
- Budget: $3 million
- Box office: $51.2 million

Iron Lung is a 2026 American independent submarine science fiction horror film starring writer, editor, and director Mark Fischbach (better known by his online alias Markiplier) in his feature-length directorial debut. It is based on the 2022 video game by David Szymanski. It also stars Caroline Kaplan, Troy Baker, Elsie Lovelock, Elle LaMont, Mick Lauer, Seán McLoughlin (Jacksepticeye), Isaac McKee and Alanah Pearce. The plot follows a convict (Markiplier) who is forced to pilot a submarine through an ocean of blood on a desolate moon following an apocalyptic event known as the "Quiet Rapture" that caused all the stars and habitable planets along with their human inhabitants to disappear without warning.

Development on an Iron Lung film adaptation began in April 2023, when Markiplier announced he would be adapting the game into film. Markiplier, who had previously played Iron Lung on his YouTube channel, stated it would be self-written, self-financed, and star himself alongside Kaplan. Szymanski had been involved with it since pre-production, assisting with its story and being on set during filming. Iron Lung was self-released by Markiplier in North America on January 30, 2026. The film received mixed reviews from critics, and was a box-office success, grossing $51 million worldwide.

== Plot ==
In the distant future, an event called the "Quiet Rapture" causes all stars, inhabited planets, and the human population to mysteriously vanish. Only lifeless planets floating in the void, and the few humans who were on space stations and spaceships during the rapture, remain.

A man named Simon is convicted and imprisoned for his involvement in destroying a space station known as Filament Station. He is sent to a newly discovered moon and forced to pilot the SM-13 (a submarine with a sealed porthole nicknamed the "Iron Lung") through the depths of the moon's ocean of blood. In order for Simon to see, he must take still images using a crude camera, and he receives limited communication from the crew on the surface via a radio. In exchange for completing the mission, Simon is promised freedom. During the dive, Simon captures images of a large skeleton on the ocean floor and is briefly brought to the surface before being tasked with collecting a sample of the skeleton. Simon demands to be freed and activates the camera, but the crew's commander berates him, explaining that the camera is an x-ray imaging device which has heavily irradiated the crew outside of the submarine.

Simon learns that he is not the first pilot of the Iron Lung after discovering a seed medallion and a voice recording left by the previous pilot. After collecting a sample, Simon captures an image of a living creature that attacks the sub, and he is knocked unconscious. Awakening in an uncharted cave system with communications lost, Simon repairs the sub and attempts to return to a charted area, capturing images of the living sea monster stalking him nearby. As Simon explores the moon he begins to hallucinate as blood slowly leaks into the submarine.

Simon finds another wrecked submarine, the SM-8, but is unable to access the data within its black box. He begins hearing a woman's voice, seemingly another convict talking through the radio, which Simon believes he is hallucinating. The voice directs Simon to a godly "light" beneath the ocean, supposedly linked to the Quiet Rapture. Upon arriving at the light, Simon experiences a vision of the blood ocean's surface, where he makes contact with both the sea monster, speaking via the woman's voice, and a mysterious entity watching him through a giant eye in a red sky. Simon awakens with the sub's communication restored, and learns he has been missing for several days, far longer than his oxygen supply should have lasted. The commander tells him to recover the data of the SM-8, promising to rescue him herself if he complies, and reveals her name to be Ava.

Simon returns to the SM-8 and uses Ava's credentials to download its data, including audio logs which confirm the light's connection to the Quiet Rapture, and that the blood ocean is composed of human blood. One of the SM-8's crew, the original source of the sea monster's voice, began obsessively drinking it before their sub was destroyed. Ava's vessel is caught by the monster; she apologizes for being unable to rescue Simon and begs him to protect the SM-8 data because it may save what is left of humanity. Simultaneously, the monster speaks to Simon again, telling him to destroy the data instead. The monster destroys Ava's vessel and attempts to kill Simon. Simon defies the monster and ties the Iron Lung's black box to a life vest, as the damaged submarine floods with blood and fleshy matter that rapidly grows and mutates his body. As the blood makes contact with the cracked medallion Simon holds, he merges with the seed within as it mutates into a giant tree, killing the monster as the submarine implodes inside its mouth. The life vest and the black box are shown floating on the surface of the ocean, discovered by an unseen party.

== Cast ==
- Markiplier as Simon, a convict
  - Kazuki Jalal as a young Simon
- Caroline Rose Kaplan as Ava
- Troy Baker as David
- Elsie Lovelock as the voice of the Monster
  - Lovelock also appears as a research lead on the SM-8
- Elle LaMont as the voice of the Monster
  - LaMont also appears as a research assistant on the SM-8
- Mick Lauer as the voice of the previous occupant of SM-13
- David Pettitt as the Father
- Holt Boggs as Eden Soldier
- Seán McLoughlin as Jack
- Alanah Pearce as a Familiar Voice

David Szymanski cameos in the film as himself. Additionally, Rahul Kohli, Ethan Nestor, Valkyrae, Mika Midgett and Robert Rexx all provide additional voices.

== Production ==
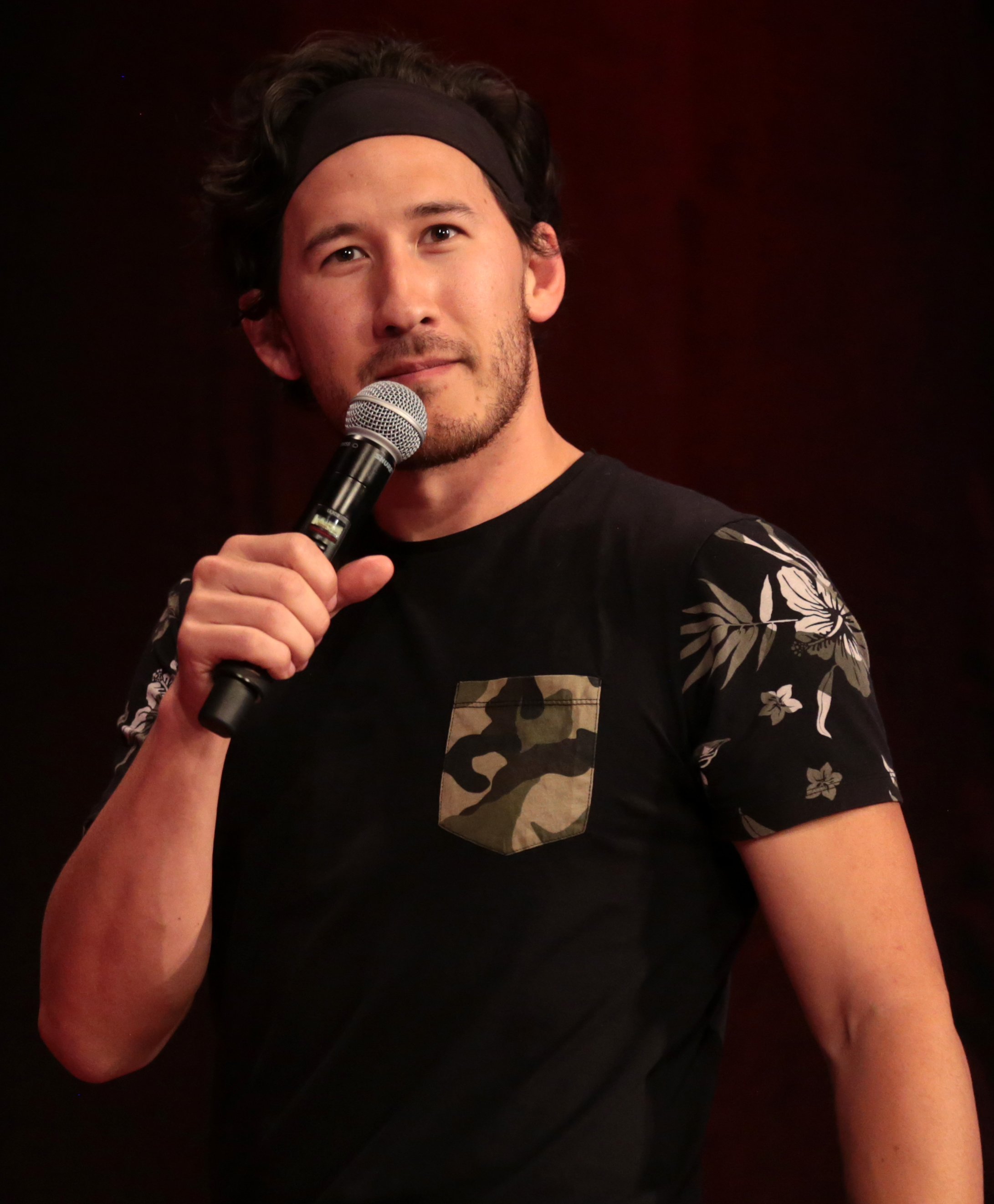
Markiplier directed, edited, wrote, starred in, and funded Iron Lung.

=== Development ===
On February 16, 2023, David Szymanski joked on Twitter that Mark Fischbach and Seán McLoughlin (known by their online usernames Markiplier and Jacksepticeye, respectively) would be starring in a film adaptation of the game Iron Lung, which Fischbach and McLoughlin had both played, with a soundtrack by Andrew Hulshult, slated for a summer release. In an interview with Variety on March 8, 2023, Markiplier confirmed he was directing, writing, and acting for a film, but did not state what it was. On May 7, 2023, McLoughlin confirmed on Twitter that he would be in it. Szymanski assisted with the script and pre-production, and filmed a brief cameo. Andrew Hulshult was also confirmed to be scoring, in what would be his first film soundtrack. Markiplier previously directed and wrote the YouTube Original films A Heist with Markiplier (2019) and In Space with Markiplier (2022).

=== Filming ===
On April 21, 2023, Markiplier officially announced a film adaptation of Iron Lung with the release of a teaser trailer. Additionally, Deadline Hollywood reported that Markiplier was also self-financing, co-starring with Caroline Kaplan, and producing with Will Hyde and Jeff Guerrero; filming had already commenced in Austin, Texas.

During production, Markiplier confirmed that Iron Lung would contain the most fake blood of any horror film, beating 2013 film Evil Dead's 50,000 US gallons (190,000 L); during filming, he had to go to the hospital after getting too much fake blood in his eyes. In a YouTube livestream posted on December 7, 2025, he revealed that the approximate amount of blood for the final movie was over 80,000 US gallons (300,000 L).

=== Post-production ===
On April 29, 2023, Markiplier announced on his YouTube channel that filming had been completed, marking the beginning of the editing and post-production process. In July 2023, Markiplier revealed that he is a member of SAG-AFTRA, and that the production of Iron Lung would be delayed due to the 2023 SAG-AFTRA strike. On October 14, 2023, Markiplier published the official trailer of Iron Lung on his YouTube channel. On October 16, in a livestream on his YouTube channel, he stated that he had turned down a role in Five Nights at Freddy's (2023) in order to produce Iron Lung, due to the two films having conflicting production schedules.

== Release ==
In June 2024, Markiplier announced that it was "officially done", and that he was in the process of negotiating its release. On December 5, 2025, Markiplier published the release date trailer and opened ticket pre-sales. Despite an initial slated release in only 60 independent US theaters, Markiplier encouraged fans to request it directly from their local theaters, leading to a grassroots word of mouth campaign reaching Cinemark, AMC, and Regal Entertainment Group, among several others. As of the official release day, January 30, 2026, it showed in 4,161 theaters worldwide.

Iron Lung debuted in North America, the United Kingdom, Australia, New Zealand, and some European territories with Piece of Magic Entertainment. Along with the release, some theaters partnered with local donation centers for moviegoers to donate blood, with a goal of breaking the world record of 37,000 donations. In February 2026, Markiplier expressed interest in releasing Iron Lung on DVD and Blu-ray.

On March 3, Warner Bros. India announced they had acquired domestic distribution rights to the film, and subsequently uploaded the trailer to their YouTube channel. The film opened in Indian theatres on March 13.

=== Streaming and home media ===
In the following months, Fischbach announced that the film would be digitally released on YouTube Movies on May 31, 2026. In exchange for streaming exclusivity, YouTube agreed to make him an aggregator himself and keep control of the film's distribution. For the physical release, Fischbach printed DVDs and Blu-rays in his home rather than selling them through a third-party manufacturer. The film was released two days early on May 29, 2026, exclusively on YouTube Movies and Google TV in the United States, the United Kingdom, Canada, Australia, and New Zealand.

== Reception ==
=== Box office ===
Iron Lung grossed $41.1 million in the United States and Canada and $10.1 million in other territories, for a worldwide total of $51.2 million. Though the film's budget was widely reported as $3 million or less, (Note: Attributed to multiple references:) Fischbach has denied this, describing it instead as "a little over" $4 million or "just under" $5 million.

In the United States and Canada, Iron Lung was released alongside Send Help and Shelter. It opened with $3.5 million on Thursday previews and was initially projected to make $9–10 million domestically on opening weekend. After an $8.9 million opening day, including Thursday previews, projections were increased to $14–17 million. It opened with an estimated $17.8 million from 3,015 theaters per Variety and Deadline, though it opened to a slightly higher $18.2 million when official figures came out.

=== Critical response ===
Metacritic review
breakdown (unweighted)

Positive
5 (50%)
Mixed
5 (50%)
Negative
0 (0%)

The film received mixed reviews from critics. On the review aggregator website Rotten Tomatoes, 63% of 51 critics' reviews are positive, with an average rating of 5.70/10. The website's consensus reads: "A claustrophobic video game adaptation that can veer into just plain stifling, Iron Lung is more interesting for its production than its story, but it conjures enough atmosphere to announce Mark Edward Fischbach as a filmmaker to watch." Metacritic, which uses a weighted average, assigned the film a score of 55 out of 100, based on 10 critics, indicating "mixed or average" reviews.

Some reviewers praised Iron Lung for its visual approach and atmosphere, while others criticized its slow pacing and Markiplier's performance. (Note: Attributed to multiple references:) Writing for The A.V. Club, Simon Abrams praised the film's attention to detail and noted its potential as a cult film, though he also characterized Fischbach's performance as "distractingly monotonous". Zachary Lee of RogerEbert.com wrote that the film's visual language was "consistently interesting" and that it was "more interestingly shot" than comparable productions but criticized Markiplier's performance as sounding like he was rehearsing; Lee gave the film 2.5 stars. Tasha Robinson of Polygon compared the film to slow burn horror such as Skinamarink and We're All Going to the World's Fair and argued it was "pretty frightening".

In more negative reviews, Eric Goldman of IGN rated the film 4/10, citing its pacing and "low energy" but praising Andrew Hulshult's score. Mike McCahill of The Guardian gave it two stars and described the production as "barebones". Dan Jolin of Empire also gave it two stars and called the film "leaden" and "monotonous", finding that its "low-budget sci-fi horror makes Event Horizon look like 2001: A Space Odyssey".

Dennis Harvey of Variety wrote that the film "could have used a wee more actual horror content". Alison Foreman of IndieWire gave the film a C+ and called it "audacious and at times astonishingly boring". Luis Pomales-Diaz of Horror Press called the film a "worthy successor" in the cosmic horror genre, praising its special effects and final act while describing Markiplier's acting as "hit or miss, but mostly hits".

Audience and user reviews are generally much more positive of the film, with the aforementioned review aggregator website Rotten Tomatoes showing 86% of audience reviews being positive

=== Accolades ===
Accolades received by Iron Lung (film)
Award	Date of ceremony	Category	Recipient(s)	Result	Ref.
National Film Awards	July 2, 2026	Best Thriller		Nominated	
National Film Awards	July 2, 2026	Best Actor	Mark Fischbach	Nominated	
National Film Awards	July 2, 2026	Best Actress	Caroline Kaplan	Won	
National Film Awards	July 2, 2026	Best Supporting Actress	Elsie Lovelock	Nominated	
National Film Awards	July 2, 2026	Best Director	Mark Fischbach	Nominated	
National Film Awards	July 2, 2026	Best Producer	Jeff Guerrero, Will Hyde	Nominated	
National Film Awards	July 2, 2026	Best Independent Film		Nominated	
Fangoria Chainsaw Awards	October 25, 2026	Best First Feature		Nominated	
Golden Joystick Awards	November 11, 2026	Best Game Adaptation		Won	

== See also ==
- List of films based on video games
- List of underwater science fiction works
- Submarine film
