= Tonight We Riot =

2020 beat 'em up video game

- Developer: Pixel Pushers Union 512
- Publisher: Means Interactive
- Platforms: Nintendo Switch, Linux, macOS, Windows
- Release: Nintendo Switch; May 5, 2020; Linux, macOS, Windows; May 8, 2020
- Genre: Beat 'em up
- Modes: Single-player, multiplayer

Tonight We Riot is a beat 'em up game released in 2020 by American studio Pixel Pushers Union 512, and published by Means Interactive, both worker cooperatives, and released for Windows, MacOS, Linux and the Nintendo Switch. The game promotes left-wing anti-capitalist ideals.

== Gameplay ==
The game follows a player-controlled crowd of workers rather than a single character, each member with their own weapons, to fight against Pinkertons, militias, and police as they move their way through a level. Players can inspire more workers to join the crowd by liberating factories and encouraging more workers to join the fight. The game's difficulty is dynamic as it is tied in part due to the size of the mob, from being extremely difficult as a single worker to challenging or easy as the mob grows in size. The levels end in boss fights ranging from large vehicles operated by the police to the President of the fictional country the game takes place in.

== Plot ==
The game follows a worker's uprising in a future year of the 21st century that begins in Factory Town, an industrial town in a fictional country. After the uprising takes over Factory Town, they begin pushing through Bootlick Bayou, a logging town, Dockyards, a port and finally the Bowling Green Estates, a wealthy neighborhood which is the capital of this country. The uprising grows in size as it proceeds through each level in each area, inspiring more and more workers along the way. The game concludes with the workers overthrowing their government, implying that an anarcho-syndicalist system is formed in its place.

== Development ==
Tonight We Riot started development around 2016, after Ted Anderson, one of the developers of Pixel Pushers Union 512, developed a smaller game called Radical Rebels which was nominated for the Gamer's Voice award at South by Southwest. Publishing partners were initially found with New Blood Interactive, who first revealed the game at PAX West 2016, then showed the game off at PAX East in 2019. The game changed publishers to Means Interactive, another worker cooperative as a publisher, as it was "a better fit" for the game and game's message.

== Reception ==
Bonus Stage gave the game a positive review, praising the gameplay, story, and message, along with the game's sense of tongue in cheek humor. Wireframe also gave the game a positive review, praising the game's crowd control mechanics and that Pixel Pushers live true to their ethos, but criticized the game's short length and difficulty level. Indie game storefront Itch.io featured Tonight We Riot on their "Games of the Month" list for May 2020. Conservative magazine National Review praised Tonight We Riot's gameplay mechanics, describing them as "innovative", but overall gave the game a negative review due to the game's short length and the shared socialist ideology of the developer and publisher, claiming that due to their ideology, they should not sell the game on the Nintendo eShop and Steam.
