= Maximum Action =

2018 video game

- Developer: George Mandell
- Publisher: Balloon Moose Games
- Engine: Unity
- Platform: Windows
- Genre: First-person shooter
- Mode: Single-player

Maximum Action is a 2018 indie first-person shooter video game created by American developer George Mandell and self-published by Mandell under the name Balloon Moose Games. The game features gun fu, ragdoll physics, and player movement inspired by Hong Kong action cinema.

== Gameplay ==
Maximum Action is a physics-based shooter that takes inspiration from games such as Max Payne, Superhot, and Action Half-Life. The game has a heavy emphasis on fluid movement using dives, slides, and kicks in addition to the running and jumping that is typical of first-person shooters. Kicks can be used to knock weapons out of the hands of enemies, move tables for cover, or to kick enemies out of windows. Dives are useful for evasion, especially when combined with a "bullet time" mechanic that slows down the passage of time, allowing for high-precision attacks.

There are a variety of weapons, each of which can be dual-wielded in combination with any other weapon. A few weapons are typically given to the player at the beginning of each scene, with the player expected to replenish their arsenal with the weapons dropped by enemies. There is also now a Workshop in the game that allows you to add new weapons and levels with high support of George Mandell.

In addition to the main campaign sequence, players may create their own levels with an included level editor and share them using Steam workshop. There is also a sandbox mode for casual play; and an endless mode, in which the player takes on waves of enemies until they are killed.

== Development ==
Maximum Action first appeared as a demo on Steam Greenlight in August 2016, acquiring enough support to join Steam that same month. The original concept was a sandbox game that focused on immersive movement and weapons handling in open-ended player-created scenarios. The game progressed with George Mandell as the sole developer, eventually releasing on Steam Early Access on September 19, 2018. The focus evolved to a series of shootout spectacles in loosely connected "scenes", each taking only a few minutes to complete.

In early 2019, John Szymanski joined the project as co-developer, leading to more frequent updates to the game. By June 2019, the team was officially partnered with New Blood Interactive under creative director David Szymanski. However, Mandell parted ways with New Blood in 2020, citing creative differences.
