= Dead Take =

2025 video game

- Developer: Surgent Studios
- Publisher: Pocketpair Publishing
- Director: Abubakar Salim
- Producer: Zoe Brown
- Programmer: Geraldo Nascimento
- Artist: Ackeem Durrant
- Writers: Dana Thompson; Dominic Hodge
- Composer: Ross Tregenza
- Engine: Unreal Engine 5
- Platform: Windows
- Release: 31 July 2025
- Genre: Adventure
- Mode: Single-player

Dead Take is a first-person adventure game developed by Surgent Studios and published by Pocketpair Publishing. The game was released for Microsoft Windows on 31 July 2025 to generally favourable reviews.

== Gameplay ==
Dead Take features gameplay from a first person perspective.

Dead Take is a first-person horror adventure game. The game has an emphasis on exploration and psychological tension over direct combat. Progression is often tied to collecting items and clues to solve puzzles found around a mansion in order to trigger cinematic sequences through full-motion video (FMV).

== Synopsis ==
The story follows Chase Lowry (Neil Newbon), an actor who is struggling to find work. Chase goes to the aftermath of a party hosted at a secluded estate in the Hollywood Hills, where his close friend and rising star Vinny Monroe (Ben Starr) has mysteriously vanished. Chase investigates the mansion to search for clues, and quickly finds himself ensnared in a nightmare.

Throughout the game, Chase uncovers disturbing secrets about the partygoers, as well as the price they pay to remain in the limelight through a series of full-motion video sequences and the use of fragmented storytelling.

The game features an ensemble cast consisting of Neil Newbon, Ben Starr, Jane Perry, Alanah Pearce, Matthew Mercer, Travis Willingham, Laura Bailey, and Sam Lake.

== Development ==
Developer Surgent Studios is based in the United Kingdom; they are known for the 2024 game Tales of Kenzera: Zau. The studio was founded by actor Abubakar Salim, who served as the game’s creative director. In contrast to their previous title, Dead Take uses a horror framework to critique the entertainment industry and the many struggles actors deal with.

A film adaptation entered development by March 2026 under Charred Pictures, co-written and co-produced by Salim and Alanah Pearce.

== Reception ==
=== Critical reception ===
Reception

Aggregate scores
Aggregator	Score
Metacritic	76/100
OpenCritic	68% recommend

Review scores
Publication	Score
Gamekult	7/10
GameSpot	8/10

Dead Take received "generally favourable" reviews, according to review aggregator website Metacritic. OpenCritic determined that 68% of critics recommended the game.

Critics praised the immersive setting, effective use of FMV, and the storytelling. However, some reviewers cited inconsistent pacing and simplistic puzzle mechanics as the game's flaws.

=== Accolades ===
Dead Take was nominated for Performer in a Supporting Role at the 22nd British Academy Games Awards, with the nomination going to Jane Perry for her role as Lia Cain.
