= Tenebris Somnia =

- Developers: Andrés Borghi, Saibot Studios
- Publisher: New Blood Interactive
- Director: Andrés Borghi
- Producer: Andrés Borghi
- Programmer: Tobías Rusjan
- Writer: Andrés Borghi
- Composers: Pablo Borghi; Clara Kovacic; David Levill
- Platforms: Nintendo Switch; Nintendo Switch 2; PlayStation 5; Windows; Xbox Series X/S
- Release: Switch, Switch 2, PS5, Windows, Xbox Series X/S; October 16, 2026
- Genre: Survival horror
- Mode: Single-player

Tenebris Somnia is a survival horror game co-created by Andrés Borghi and Tobías Rusjan in association with Saibot Studios, and developed in Argentina. It is published by New Blood Interactive and released for Nintendo Switch, PlayStation 5, Windows, and Xbox Series X/S on October 16, 2026. A version for Nintendo Switch 2 is planned.

== Gameplay ==
The player must solve puzzles by interacting with objects in the environment and combining items in their inventory. Julia is able to run and avoid enemies in each room. Enemies will still remain and new enemies will be added on in the same room if left alive. Enemies will always chase and attack if Julia is in their line of sight. Bosses cannot be avoided. The combat consists of ranged and melee where the player can get a wrench, pistol, iron pipe, and shotgun. The wrench is quick to swing whereas the iron pipe has a slower attack. Healing items and ammo are limited and can be found from killing certain enemies or around the map. There are four different endings with the first two being main endings. The third and fourth are joke endings.

== Plot ==
The plot follows Julia, an amateur filmmaker, who has recently begun having nightmares about her ex-boyfriend, Ivan. Upon returning to the apartment they shared, Julia finds a strange book with pages she cannot read, and Ivan's study door sealed shut by a waxy substance. Upon dissolving it, she enters an alternate dimension based on Ivan's memories.

Travelling through this dimension, the Desiderium, Julia encounters various hostile monsters, as well as an enigmatic woman in a red dress and a gravely injured man named Sanguis. Sanguis explains that they are Relicta, wandering spirits who contacted Ivan and offered to remove the part of his soul that is still obsessed with Julia to allow him to move on from her, though it came at the cost of giving them his body. Sanguis claims that he is looked down on by the other Relicta and as such he wants to work against them. He also explains that the strange waxy figures that populate the Desiderium are called Rubralacras, born when a subject's memories include living things that the Desiderium cannot replicate.

Continuing, Julia defeats Obscuratus and obtains a pill called the Lapis Fictus and gives it to Sanguis, who explains that once the Relicta begin using Ivan's flesh, they can take a physical form and interact with the world around them, including hurting Julia. He also tells her that Ivan will have been taken to one of the lower floors of the Desiderium, and that the lower the floor, the earlier the memory.

Julia descends through the floors of the Desiderium, collecting the tape reels of Ivan's amateur film "Devora," one of which has been cursed to force her to leave the building and wipe her memories of it. While exploring, she finds a recreation of Devora's set and the film school they both attended together, as well as fighting Fumus to unlock the office building where Ivan pitched Devora as a feature length film, but was ultimately rejected. After developing a photo of the two at Devora's public debut, Ivan stumbles into the room, but is quickly dragged away by an unseen force, up to the school's stage area. Hurrying after him, Julia finds Sanguis, still heavily wounded, who says he is willing to help in any way he can. The two enter the stage and Sanguis is knocked down by Vitra, the women in the red dress.

Once Julia defeats Vitra, Sanguis gives her the Lapis fictus pill, claiming that if she truly loves Ivan, she can sacrifice herself for him and free him from the Relicta's grasp. He dies, claiming that he was happy to have died in service of Vitra's defeat. Backstage, Julia finds Ivan laying on the floor, heavily bloodied and missing body parts. She takes the pill, intending to sacrifice herself for him, but instead doubles over in pain as her skin is marked with sigils, and she finds herself separated from her Relicta, which is led away by Ivan's. Sanguis appears once again, explaining that by taking the pill, she performed the same ritual as Ivan and is now marked, allowing the Relicta to use her flesh to take physical form. He stabs himself with a ritualistic dagger, causing his physical form to disappear and, while Julia is escaping, he takes a chunk of her flesh to create a new one, becoming a monstrous dog that chases Julia through the stage.

After her escape, Julia follows Ivan and her own Relicta to a recreation of the Cinema where she left him, but her way is blocked by a horde of Relicta. As she tries to find a way to escape, she realises her copy of Ivan's apartment keys (which she has been carrying since the beginning of the game) carry a curse similar to the tape reel, which has been removing her worst memories of their relationship. She manages to discard them, and slowly the memories of Ivan's abuse return.

After his pitch for Devora was rejected, Ivan began a downward spiral, slowly becoming more and more short-tempered, culminating in a holiday in Mendoza where, desperate to be alone, Julia tried to go on a walk, but was stopped by Ivan, who choked her out. From that moment, she was determined to leave him, but never found the courage until he was poised to propose to her, causing her to return to the apartment, gather her belongings, and abandon him.

Back in the Desiderium, Julia learns that the Relicta can actually be killed, but only by a sharp object made from the same wax-like substance as the Rubralacras, tempered by chemicals and bathed in moonlight to become an Aurifier. Once she obtains it, there are two possible endings.

If Julia kills any of the Relicta on the way to the final fight, she will face Ivan's Relicta and be dragged away by her own, which she then stabs. She fades back into the real world, the marks on her skin gone. While travelling on the subway, she sees Sanguis and quickly leaves, returning home where Ivan awaits her. This is what the game considers the bad ending.

If none of the Relicta are killed on the way to the final fight, Julia will instead face her own Relicta. Once defeated a similar scene will play out where Ivan drags her away and is stabbed, this time by Vitra, who speaks to Juila outside of the fight on both paths. With Ivan dead, Julia and her Relicta reunite, becoming whole again, and she once again returns to the real world. The scene cuts to Julia directing her debut film, and it being shown at a film festival to positive feedback. This is the Good Ending.

== Cast ==
The principal cast are:

- Clara Kovacic as Julia
- Pedro Merlo as Ivan
- Maria Eugenia Rigon as Vitra
- Esteban Prol as Sanguis
- Yael Tesouro as desfigurate woman

== Development ==
In the middle of 2022, Andrés Borghi and Tobías Rusjan first came up with the idea for the game. An initial demo was released in September 2023. In October 2023, Andrés Borghi and Clara Kovacic were interviewed for the podcast Press Over and explained the concept of the game and its main story. Tenebris Somnia was present at EVA 2024, an Argentine video game convention, here another trailer was released. Additionally, Borghi and Rusjan produced a short film, Devora, related to the main story. The actress Clara Kovacic was also involved in the production.

== Reception ==
Reception

Aggregate scores
Aggregator	Score
Metacritic	(PC) 79/100
OpenCritic	89% recommend

The PC version of Tenebris Somnia received generally favorable reviews from critics, according to the review aggregation website Metacritic. Fellow review aggregator OpenCritic assessed that the game received "mighty" approval, being recommended by 89% of critics.

In a interview with Argentine newspaper Infobae Borghi noted the difference between the live action scenes and the 2D videogame
