= God of War Laufey =

Upcoming 2027 video game

- Developer: Santa Monica Studio
- Publisher: Sony Interactive Entertainment
- Director: Ariel Lawrence
- Writers: Elize Morgan; Jimmie Myers; Alanah Pearce
- Composer: Bear McCreary
- Series: God of War
- Platform: PlayStation 5
- Release: May 20, 2027
- Genre: Action-adventure
- Mode: Single-player

God of War Laufey is an upcoming action-adventure game in development by Santa Monica Studio and to be published by Sony Interactive Entertainment. It is scheduled to be released on May 20, 2027, for the PlayStation 5. The 11th installment in the God of War series, it will be the first mainline game in which series protagonist Kratos is not the main character, instead featuring his wife Laufey, also known as Faye, a powerful Jötnar who had died just prior to the events of God of War (2018). In addition to Norse mythology, the game will introduce other mythologies as it will be set in a place called Everywhen, the afterlife of the gods. The game's narrative will occur simultaneously with that of God of War (2018) and God of War Ragnarök (2022) and will see Faye battling through Everywhen as her plans to protect Kratos and their son Atreus are at risk, with her coming into conflict with both Sekhmet and Begtse, the respective gods of war of Egyptian and Mongolian mythologies.

== Gameplay ==
God of War Laufey will be a single-player action-adventure game in which the player controls the titular character Laufey (Faye). The combat builds upon the system utilized in God of War (2018) and God of War Ragnarök (2022), while incorporating the movement and fluidity of the earlier games in the series. Compared with Kratos, Faye has greater mobility and can transition between ground and aerial attacks without interrupting combat. She wields a sword guarded by the enchanted ribbon Rue, with its combat emphasizing on speed, control, and maintaining momentum by chaining attacks together.

Faye also possesses magical abilities associated with her title as the Golden Hand of the Jötnar. Using her golden palm, she can separate an enemy's soul from its body. The detached soul can then be attacked directly or knocked into other enemies, allowing the ability to be incorporated into combos and used against groups of opponents.

== Synopsis ==
=== Setting ===
God of War Laufey will take place simultaneously with the events of God of War (2018) and Ragnarök. It will be set primarily in the Everywhen, a transcendent realm that serves as the birthplace and final destination of magic and the afterlife of gods from different mythologies. While continuing themes of Norse mythology, the game will also introduce other mythologies, such as Egyptian and Mongolian.

=== Characters ===
The main protagonist is Laufey, commonly referred to as Faye (played by Deborah Ann Woll). She is a powerful Jötunn warrior, the wife of Kratos (Christopher Judge), and the mother of Atreus. Previously the guardian of the Jötnar and a rebel leader against the Æsir who became known as Laufey the Just, Faye awakens in the Everywhen following her death and attempts to preserve the plans she created to protect her family. Faye is accompanied by Phranque (Jack Quaid) and Rue (Perlina Lau). Phranque is a curious cosmic cube who does not remember his past, is always focused in the present, and is protective of his friends and the inhabitants of the Everywhen. Rue is an enchanted ribbon entrusted with preventing a devastatingly powerful sword from falling into the wrong hands. She allows Faye to wield it, becoming Faye's primary weapon.

Returning characters include Kratos, Faye's husband and the former Greek God of War, and their son Atreus. Although they are not the central playable characters, protecting them serves as the principal motivation for Faye's journey. Announced antagonistic characters include Sekhmet and Begtse, the respective gods of war of Egyptian and Mongolian mythologies.

=== Plot ===
The story begins after Laufey's funeral as depicted at the beginning of God of War (2018). Just after her husband Kratos and their son Atreus cremate her corpse in the living world in the realm of Midgard, she unexpectedly awakens in the Everywhen, where the natural flow of magic has been disrupted and gods and creatures from multiple mythologies compete for power. Faye discovers that the plans she left behind to protect Kratos and Atreus are in danger. While searching for a way to return home, she encounters Phranque, a cosmic cube, and Rue, an enchanted ribbon guardian responsible for protecting a powerful sword. Her journey also brings her into conflict with the gods Sekhmet and Begtse.

== Development ==
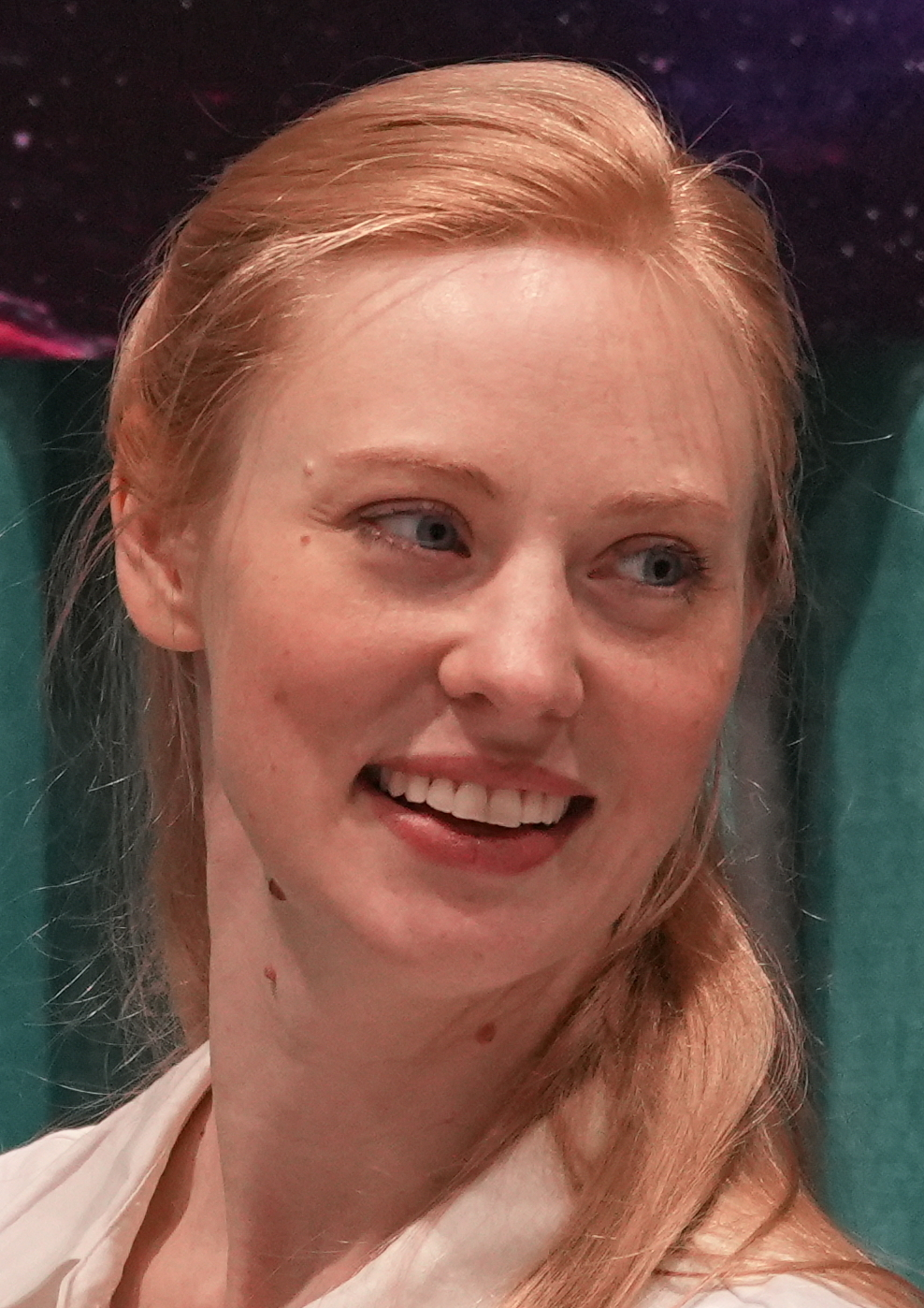
Deborah Ann Woll reprises her role of the game's protagonist, Laufey (Faye), from God of War Ragnarök (2022).

Development of God of War Laufey is led by game director Ariel Lawrence, while the story is written by narrative director Jimmie Myers, lead writer Elize Morgan, and staff writers including Alanah Pearce, Orion Walker, Lauren Signorino, and Jeremy Bernstein. Bear McCreary returned to compose the score, having previously worked on God of War (2018) and Ragnarök, as well as Sons of Sparta (2026). Deborah Ann Woll reprises her role of Laufey from Ragnarök, joined by Jack Quaid as the cosmic cube Phranque and Perlina Lau as the enchanted ribbon Rue. A game centered around Laufey had been planned by series creative director Cory Barlog since 2018, with him pitching Deborah Ann Woll the game when she signed on to play her in Ragnarök with a poster with both her character and Phranque. The game was announced during Sony's State of Play presentation on June 2, 2026, alongside a 20-minute gameplay trailer, confirming it was in development for the PlayStation 5.

In July 2026, following Sony Interactive Entertainment's announcement that it would cease production of physical game discs and would only release games digitally beginning in January 2028, the game's developer Santa Monica Studio affirmed that Laufey would be available on disc, with the release date subsequently confirmed as February 16, 2027. However, in a post made on November 4, 2026, Santa Monica revealed that the game's release had been delayed by three months to May 20, 2027, stating they needed more time in order to meets fans' expectations.

== Release ==
The game will be released worldwide on May 20, 2027, for the PlayStation 5. Pre-orders for both the physical and digital versions of the game opened on September 29, 2026. Pre-orders for the physical edition include the Last Wish armor set for Faye, a Golden Leaves appearance for Phranque, and an in-game resource pack. The Digital Deluxe Edition includes the Dark Alchemy set (armor, blade, bow scales, and catalyst), an in-game resource pack, a digital mini artbook, and a digital copy of the game's official soundtrack.

Available separately will be a limited quantity Collector Box that does not include the game (physical or digital). It contains an eight-inch tall light-up statue depicting Faye, Phranque, and Rue fighting against Begtse's soldiers, a 51-card Oracle Deck featuring custom illustrations for each card by artist Megan Lara, and a physical mini artbook with concept art depicting the characters, creatures, and environments of the game. Pre-orders for the Collector Box opened on October 13, 2026.

Laufey is a nominee for "Most Anticipated" game at The Game Awards 2026.
