= Alanah Pearce =

Australian video game writer and journalist (born 1993)

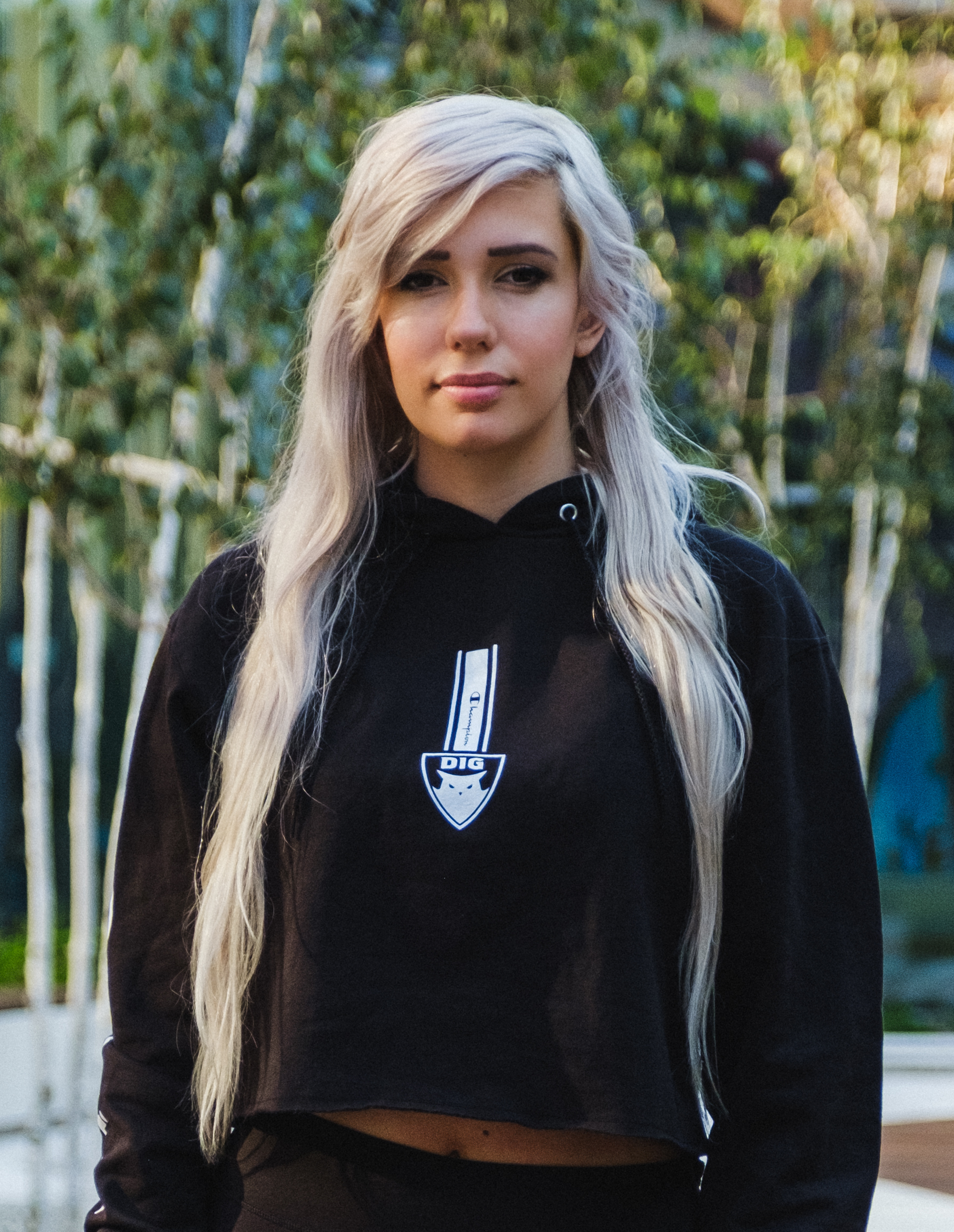
- Pearce in 2020
- Born: 24 August 1993 (age 33); Cairns, Queensland, Australia
- Education: Queensland University of Technology
- Occupations: Video game writer; journalist; content creator
- Years active: 2012–present
- Employers: IGN (2015–2018); Rooster Teeth (2018–2020); Santa Monica Studio (2020–2024)

YouTube information
- Channel: alanahpearce
- Genre: Video games
- Subscribers: 686 thousand (Note: Pearce has an additional 112 thousand subscribers on her Alanah IRL channel, 44 thousand on Alanah Streams, and 36 thousand on Play, Watch, Listen+.)
- Views: 13 million (Note: Pearce has an additional 6.6 million views on her Alanah IRL channel, 2.7 million on Alanah Streams, and 1.8 million on Play, Watch, Listen+.)
- Last updated: 4 April 2026

Alanah Pearce (born 24 August 1993) is an Australian video game writer, content creator, actor and former journalist. From 2020 to 2024, Pearce worked as a writer for American game developer Santa Monica Studio.

Pearce has reported on video games for various news outlets including entertainment news website IGN. She worked at production company Rooster Teeth from 2018 to 2020, during which she hosted the Inside Gaming news program and was involved with its Funhaus division, which produced videos focused on video games.

== Early life and education ==
Alanah Pearce was born in Cairns, Queensland, Australia, on 24 August 1993. Pearce was raised in Cairns, and later spent nine years in Brisbane. From a young age, she was interested in writing and video games, doing reviews of video games in her diaries. While working at a call center, she found a job listing for a volunteer games journalist position that inspired a career in journalism. She earned a bachelor's degree studying mass communication at the Queensland University of Technology in Brisbane.

== Career ==
=== Journalism ===
From 2012 to 2015, Pearce wrote gaming news for around a dozen news outlets, including Impulse Gamer, Zelda Universe, the BBC, and worked stints at Australian radio and television stations. She launched a YouTube channel in 2012, where she publishes game reviews and personal videos.

Feeling the Australian video game industry was too small, Pearce moved to the United States in 2015. She began work as an editor and writer for IGN later that year. In 2017, she replaced Naomi Kyle as host of IGN's Daily Fix gaming news program. Later that year, she was involved in a staff walkout until the company issued a statement addressing sexual harassment allegations made by former editor Kallie Plagge. Pearce cohosted the SXSW Gaming Awards alongside Rich Campbell in 2018.

After departing IGN in 2018, Pearce joined production company Rooster Teeth. She regularly appeared in videos for Funhaus, a division of Rooster Teeth which produced videos focused on video games, and cohosted the company's Inside Gaming news program starting in 2019. She left Rooster Teeth in October 2020.

=== Game development and acting ===
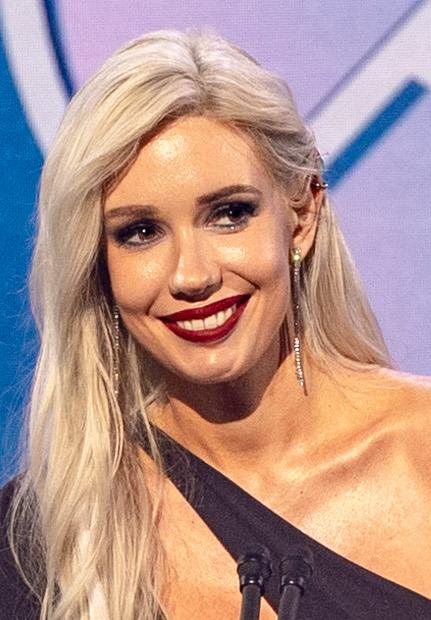
Pearce at the Game Developers Conference in 2024

In November 2020, Pearce joined Sony's Santa Monica Studio as a video game writer. She provided consulting on three video games and completed other work on two video games prior to joining the studio. She faced harassment on social media following the studio's decision to delay the release of God of War Ragnarök. In November, she was selected among the Forbes 30 Under 30 for gaming.

Pearce did voice acting for Gears 5 (2019), Afterparty (2019), Dispatch (2025), and Warhammer 40,000: Boltgun 2 (2026), appeared in Dead Take (2025), and lent her voice and likeness to a character in Cyberpunk 2077 (2020).

In December 2024, Pearce revealed that she was leaving Santa Monica Studio, citing her desire for the flexibility to visit her family in Australia more often as the key factor in her decision. She announced her intent to focus on freelance work, live streaming, and content creation following her departure. (Note: I'm leaving Sony Santa Monica Studio. on YouTube) One of her projects at the studio, God of War Laufey, was announced in June 2026.

=== Podcasting ===
Pearce is the host of the Play, Watch, Listen podcast, along with Troy Baker, Mike Bithell, and Austin Wintory. She also hosts the podcasts Red Lips, Orange Car, Video Game Writing 101, and Voice Acting 101, and formerly hosted Idiots and a Broad. She was a founding host of the Kinda Funny Xcast, but left the show several months after its premiere due to scheduling conflicts with her new job at Santa Monica Studio. (Note: Alanah Pearce's Last Episode! - Kinda Funny Xcast Ep. 16 on YouTube)

=== Other activities ===
Pearce participated in the Creator Clash 2 boxing event in April 2023, beating content creator RIPmika by split decision.

Pearce was briefly banned from Twitch following a DMCA takedown notice sent by Nintendo after she live-streamed herself reacting to already published preview footage of its game, The Legend of Zelda: Tears of the Kingdom, five days before its release.

Pearce appears as Halley in the 2024 film V/H/S/Beyond, in the final segment "Stowaway", directed by Kate Siegel and written by Mike Flanagan.

In 2026, Pearce launched her own indie production company named Charred Pictures focusing on adapting video games into films and television series together with the game developers of the games. The first project in development is a film based on the horror game Faith: The Unholy Trinity by Airdorf Games.

== Personal life ==
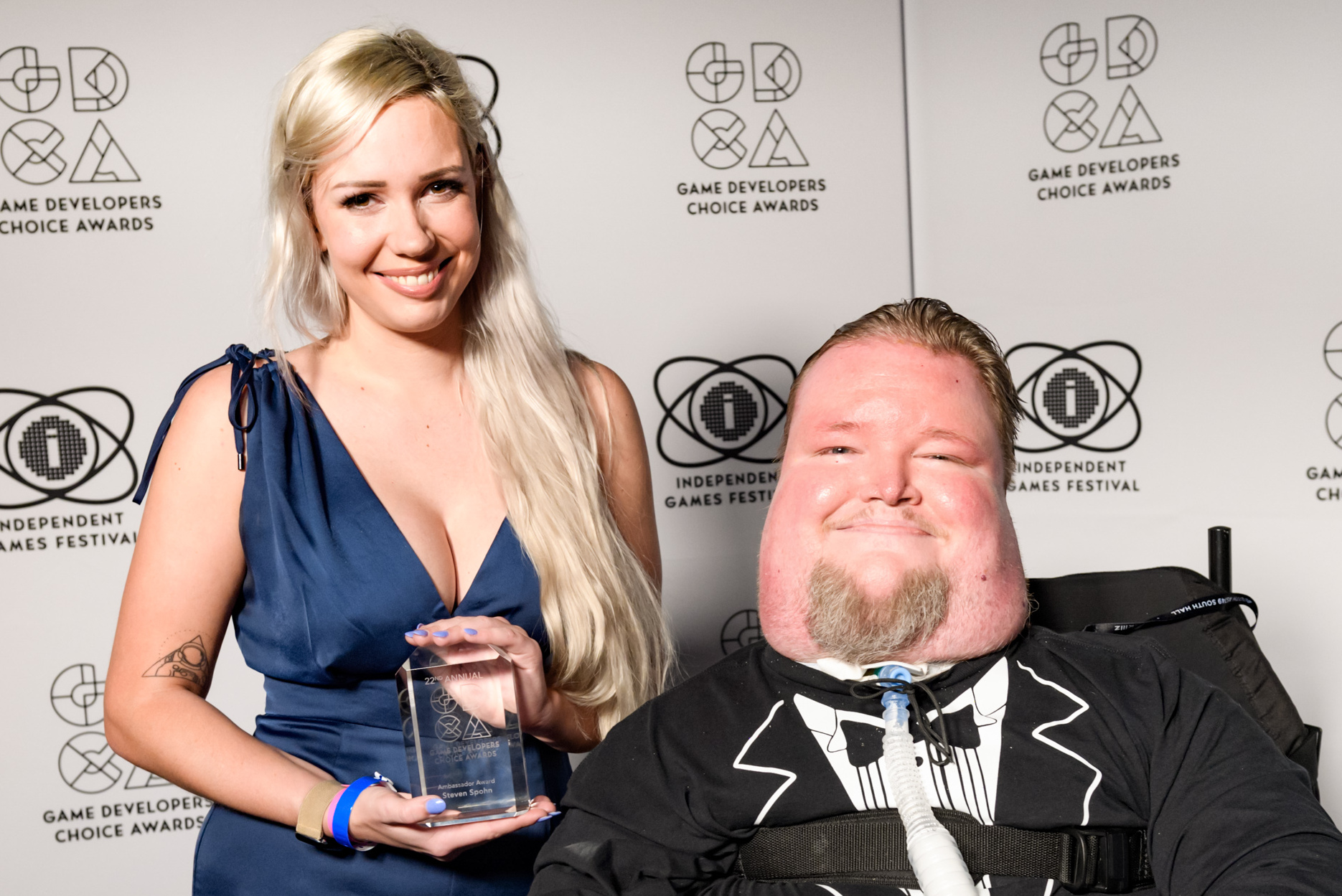
Pearce co-hosts the Video Game Accessibility Awards with Steven Spohn.

Pearce credits video games with helping her deal with the effects of myalgic encephalomyelitis and tendinitis. She has helped fundraise for AbleGamers, a charity dedicated to improving accessibility in video games. She co-hosted the inaugural Video Game Accessibility Awards with AbleGamers's chief operating officer Steven Spohn in November 2020, and returned to present the second event in March 2022.

In 2014, Pearce became the focus of news media after she wrote to the mothers of internet trolls who had sent her rape threats. In 2019, she was subject to harassment after the Entertainment Software Association, the organiser of the E3 gaming expo, leaked the personal information of E3 2019 media attendees to the public.

Pearce came out in June 2020; while she does not feel an attachment to any label, she felt best defined by the term pansexual. In July 2024, she made a video where she reflected and discussed her previous post. In the video she described herself as both pansexual and demisexual.

== Works ==
=== Acting ===
Year	Title	Role	Notes	Ref.
2018	IGN's Far Cry 5: Choose Your Own Adventure	Herself	Web series	
2018	Sugar Pine 7	Herself	Web series; 6 episodes	
2019	Arizona Circle	Cynthia / Kate, Secretary	Web series; 2 episodes	
2020	The Monster Under My Bed	Sasha	Animated short	
2021	RWBY	Computer Terminal	Animated web series; 1 episode	
2021	One Year	Woman	Short; also writer, director, editor, and producer	
2022	KOllOK 1991	Charmelle	Podcast series; 1 episode	
2024	Miss Crow	Miss Crow	Animated short; also writer and director	
2024	V/H/S/Beyond	Halley	Feature film; segment: "Stowaway"	
2025	The Comic Shop	Alyssa	Web series; 1 episode	
2026	Iron Lung	A Familiar Voice	Feature film	
2026	Carrie	Operator #1	TV series; 1 episode	
TBA	The Money Tree	Kate	Short	

==== Video games ====
Year	Title	Role	Ref.
2019	Gears 5	NPCs	
2019	Afterparty	NPC	
2020	Cyberpunk 2077	Lana Prince	
2024	Abiotic Factor	Kylie Muir	
2025	Dead Take	Victoria Cross	
2025	Dispatch	Malevola	
2026	Warhammer 40,000: Boltgun 2	Nyra Veyrath	

=== Filmmaking ===
Year	Title	Director	Producer	Writer	Notes	Ref.
2021	One Year	Yes	Yes	Yes	Short; also editor	
2024	Miss Crow	Yes	No	Yes	Animated short	
2025	The Comic Shop	Yes	No	No	Web series; 1 episode	
2026	Godmother	No	Yes	Yes	Feature film	
TBA	Faith: The Unholy Trinity	No	Yes	Yes	Feature film	
TBA	Dead Take	No	Yes	Yes	Feature film	

=== Video game development ===
Year	Title	Credit(s)	Ref.
2022	God of War Ragnarök	Accessibility consultant	
2026	Nullstar: Solus	Writer	
2027	God of War Laufey	Writer	
TBA	Layers Deep	Narrative director	

=== Hosting ===
Year	Title	Credit(s)	Ref.
2012–2014	Xbox Insider	Host	
2013–2015	Zed Games	Host and writer	
2015–2018	IGN	Host, writer, editor, director, and producer	
2018	SXSW Gaming Awards	Co-Host and writer	
2018–2021	Funhaus	Host, writer, editor, director, and producer	
2020	Kinda Funny Xcast	Host	
2020	Video Game Accessibility Awards	Creator, writer, director, producer, and host	
2021	British Academy Games Awards	Presenter	
2022	Cobra Kai: Unlocked	Host	
2022	Video Game Accessibility Awards	Creator, writer, director, producer, and host	
2024	Game Developers Choice Awards	Host and writer	

=== Books ===
Year	Title	Notes	Ref.
2020	Things I Learned from Mario's Butt	Chapter: "The Science that Supports Solid Snake's Nerfed Butt"	
2022	God of War: The Official Cookbook of the Nine Realms	Lore entries	

== Awards and nominations ==
Year	Work	Association	Category	Result	Ref.
2015	Content Creation	Shorty Awards	Best in Gaming	Nominated	
2020	Content Creation	The Game Awards	Content Creator of the Year	Nominated	
2021	Charity	American Red Cross	Rescue Royale Hero of the Year	Won	
2021	Content Creation	the*gamehers Awards	Top YouTuber of the Year	Won	
2022	Play, Watch, Listen	The Communicator Awards	Host	Won	
2022	Game Development	the*gamehers Awards	Game Developer of the Year	Won	
2024	One Year	Check the Gate	Best Experimental Film	Won	
