= New Blood Interactive =

Video game publisher

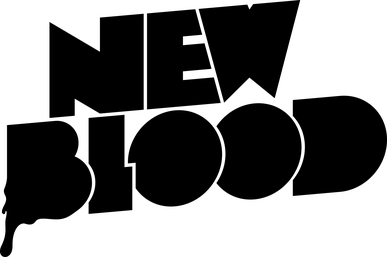
- Type: Private
- Industry: Video games
- Founded: 2014; 12 years ago
- Founders: Aaron Alexander; Kreyg DeZago; Dave Oshry
- Key people: Dave Oshry (CEO)
- Number of employees: c. 50 (2025)
- Website: newblood.games

New Blood Interactive is a video game publisher founded by Aaron Alexander, Kreyg DeZago, and Dave Oshry in 2014. The company originally developed virtual reality games before turning to publishing, first releasing Nick Clinkscales's Super Galaxy Squadron and finding early success with David Szymanski's Dusk.

== History ==
New Blood Interactive was founded in 2014 by lead designer Aaron Alexander, lead programmer Kreyg DeZago, and chief executive officer Dave Oshry. Alexander and Oshry had previously collaborated on the 2013 remake of Rise of the Triad. The company initially aimed to develop virtual reality games, including a boxing game it wanted to present at the Game Developers Conference. However, these plans never materialized. Oshry later came into contact with Nick Clinkscales. At the time, New Blood was looking for a pixel artist and Clinkscales needed a publisher for his Kickstarter-backed game Super Galaxy Squadron, so they agreed that New Blood would publish the game and Clinkscales join the company in return. Super Galaxy Squadron was released in January 2015. It was remastered as Super Galaxy Squadron EX in February 2016, with the Super Galaxy Squadron EX Turbo version released in March 2017.

When Oshry encountered David Szymanski, who knew Oshry had worked on the Rise of the Triad remake, Szymanski spontaneously decided to pitch his boomer shooter game Dusk. New Blood released the game into early access in January 2018, and its success gave the company long-time financial support. New Blood subsequently signed publishing agreements for further retro-style games, including Amid Evil and Faith: The Unholy Trinity. Towards the end of Dusk's early-access phase, the company brought in Dillon Rogers to help complete the game, which was released in December 2018. As New Blood employees, Rogers and Szymanski commenced work on the stealth game Gloomwood. Oshry considered this the beginning of a new phase for the studio, turning from solely a publisher to also developing games internally. The company also acquired the publishing rights to Blood West in November 2024 and published its expansion, Dead Man's Promise. In September 2025, New Blood Interactive announced its foray into publishing games for Xbox consoles with ports of Dusk, Amid Evil, Faith and Blood West for the Xbox Series X/S.

== Organization ==
As of December 2025, New Blood has nearly 50 employees. The company has a flat hierarchy with many developers helping out on other projects. Most planning is done via Discord. Oshry oversees all development teams and manages the internal quality assurance team, which routinely tests games during their development. Oshry supports trade unions in the video game industry.

== Games published ==
Year	Title	Developer(s)	Platform(s)
2015	Super Galaxy Squadron	Psyche Studios	Linux, Windows
2018	Dusk	David Szymanski	Linux, macOS, Nintendo Switch, PlayStation 4, Windows, Xbox Series X/S
2019	Amid Evil	Indefatigable	Windows, Xbox Series X/S
2020	Unfortunate Spacemen	Geoff "Zag" Keene	Windows
2020	Ultrakill (early access)	Arsi "Hakita" Patala	Windows
2021	Dusk '82	David Szymanski	Nintendo Switch, Windows
2022	Gloomwood (early access)	Dillon Rogers, David Szymanski	Windows
2022	Faith: The Unholy Trinity	Airdorf Games	Nintendo Switch, Windows, Xbox Series X/S
2023	Amid Evil VR	Indefatigable, Andre Elijah Immersive	Windows
2023	Rise of the Triad: Ludicrous Edition	Nightdive Studios	Nintendo Switch, PlayStation 4, PlayStation 5, Windows, Xbox One, Xbox Series X/S
2024	Fallen Aces (early access)	Trey Powell, Jason Bond	Windows
2024	Blood West	Hyperstrange	Windows, Xbox Series X/S
2026	Dungeons of Dusk	68k Studios	Windows
2026	Tenebris Somnia	Andrés Borghi, Saibot Studios	Windows
TBA	Untitled CRPG	TBA	TBA
TBA	Untitled top-down shooter	TBA	TBA
TBA	Untitled vehicular combat game	TBA	TBA
TBA	Untitled Faith visual novel	TBA	TBA

=== Unreleased ===
Title	Developer(s)	Notes	Ref(s).
Lazer Type	Labcoat Studios		
Tonight We Riot	Pixel Pushers Union 512	Changed publishers to Means Interactive	
Maximum Action	George Mandell	Changed publishers to Balloon Moose Games	
