= Fallout: Bakersfield =

Upcoming total conversion mod

- Developers: Alexander Berezin; Denis Berezin
- Engine: GZDoom
- Platforms: Windows, macOS, Linux
- Genre: First-person shooter
- Mode: Single-player

Fallout: Bakersfield is an upcoming fan‑made total conversion mod for the Doom source port GZDoom, designed to recreate Fallout (1997) as a first‑person shooter. Developed by Alexander Berezin and Denis Berezin, the mod blends classic Fallout aesthetics with Doom‑style 2.5D sprite‑based visuals.

== Gameplay ==
The mod retains Doom’s fast‑paced combat while integrating Fallout’s signature UI and text‑based logs. HUD elements combine Doom’s character face panel with Fallout’s monochrome green log messages narrating actions and environmental context. The trailer also hints at simple dialogue options and inventory interactions within the FPS structure. The game is set in Necropolis, the post-war remnants of Bakersfield, California and a location in Fallout.

== Development ==
Fallout: Bakersfield was first announced in 2022, but updates were scarce until a new trailer was released in July 2025, confirming the project’s continuation. According to the developers, the game world, wall tiles, and scenery are approximately 80% complete, while the creatures and weapons are at 30% and 50% completion, respectively.

== Reception ==
The mod has garnered widespread acclaim from major gaming outlets for its visual quality and authentic recreation of the original Fallout atmosphere. IGN described the teaser trailer as “stunning and surprisingly cinematic,” highlighting how the mod “brings Fallout's Necropolis to Doom” and citing player reactions such as, “never seen a fan project get so close to the OG vibe.” GameSpot called it “mind‑blowing,” emphasizing its cinematic quality and faithful aesthetic blend of Doom and Fallout. PC Gamer similarly praised the project, noting that the new teaser not only confirmed ongoing development but also dispelled earlier speculation that it had been abandoned. The outlet emphasized the impressive scope of the project, particularly given that it is being developed by only two creators.

== See also ==
- Doom modding
- Bloom
- Brutal Doom
