= Bloom (video game mod) =

2021 video game modification

- Cover art of Bloom
- Developer: Bloom Team
- Designer: Antonio González
- Programmers: Antonio González; Virgilio Virzo
- Artist: Roberto Julio
- Composers: ASCIIMOV; Buio Mondo
- Engine: GZDoom
- Platforms: Windows, macOS, Linux
- Release: October 31, 2021
- Genre: First-person shooter
- Modes: Single-player, multiplayer

Bloom is a fan-made modification built on the Doom source port GZDoom. It combines elements from Doom II (1994), developed by id Software, and Blood (1997) by Monolith Productions to create a crossover experience. The mod was developed by the Spanish indie studio Bloom Team and released on Mod DB on October 31, 2021.

== Gameplay ==
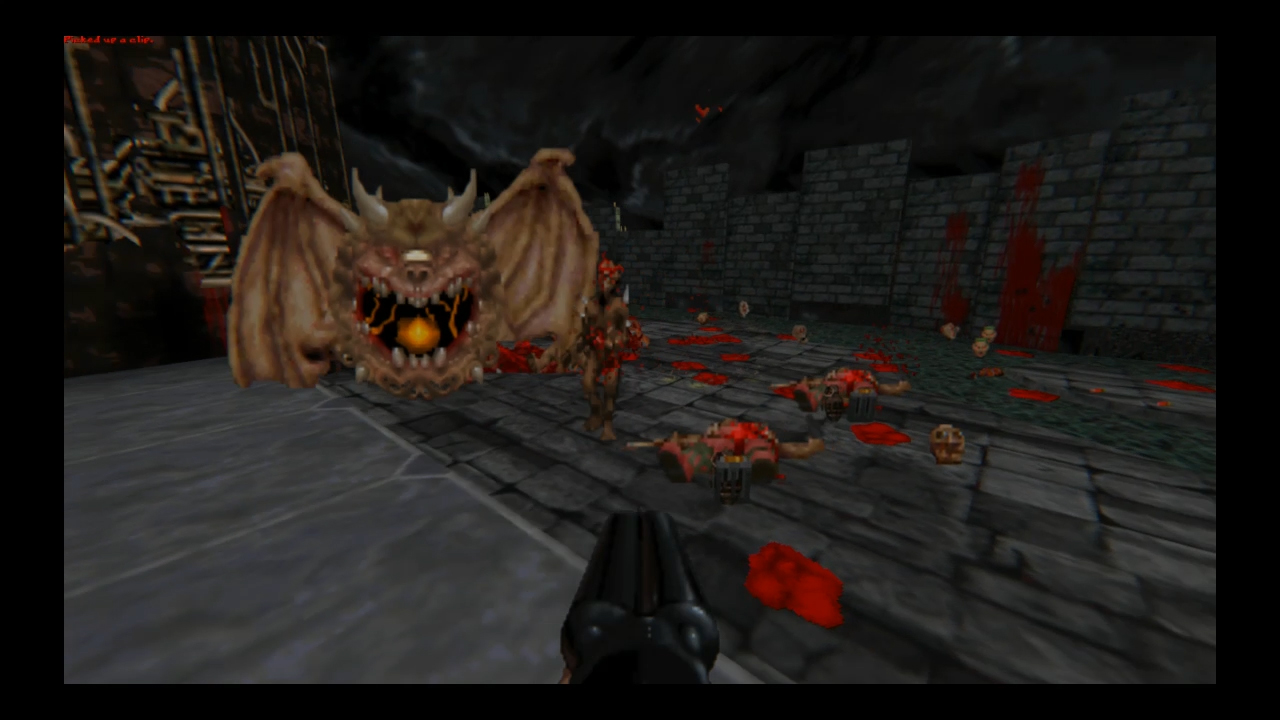
Enemies are hybrids composed of monsters from Doom II and Blood.

Players must navigate each level to reach the exit while overcoming numerous hazards. The mod introduces hybrid enemies that combine traits of monsters from Doom II and Blood, as well as levels built using design elements from both games. Players can choose between two protagonists, Doomguy and Caleb, each equipped with unique weapons and abilities.

In addition to original weapons, the mod adds new ones such as a revolver, grenades, and a flamethrower, alongside graphical improvements including voxel models and upgraded lighting effects. Bloom supports cooperative play and offers five difficulty levels. It is compatible with Doom, Doom II, Final Doom, Sigil, and various custom WADs.

== Development ==
Bloom was originally conceived and created by Spanish developer Drugod (Antonio González) under the title Bloom – Rise of Caleb, with the initial aim of adding Blood enemies into the Doom source port GZDoom. The first gameplay footage was published on Drugod’s YouTube channel in April 2016. To evolve the project into a complete crossover experience, a small group of developers joined him, forming what became known as the Bloom Team. A public demo — featuring four maps, hybrid enemies drawn from both games, and a full soundtrack composed by Buio Mondo, was released on Mod DB on October 31, 2019. The final version launched on Mod DB on October 31, 2021, expanding the content with nine levels, an original storyline, cutscenes, and an entirely new soundtrack composed by ASCIIMOV. The source code of the project was later made available on GitHub.

== Reception ==
The mod received praise from Jace Hall, the former CEO and founder of Monolith Productions, who described it as "awesome" on his personal X account. Dominic Tarason of Rock, Paper, Shotgun named Bloom one of the best Doom mods, calling it "an extremely cool concept" and "a real treat, visually and aurally". Chris J. Capel of PCGamesN described it as "a ridiculously fun FPS" and a "wonderfully unique hybrid". Ángel Morán of Hobby Consolas called Bloom “the best mod to ever combine Doom and Blood” and “one of the finest mods ever made for Doom.” YouTube game reviewer GmanLives praised the mod's level design, visuals, and atmosphere, describing it as "one of the best Doom mods ever made".

=== Awards ===
Bloom won the "Best Crossover Mod" and "Best Upcoming Mod" awards from Mod DB in 2019.

== Legacy ==
After the success of Bloom, several games and mods were developed as its spiritual successors:

- Call of the Void, a Quake II mod that fuses enemies and environments from Quake and Quake II, echoing the concept pioneered by Bloom. It was released in September 2025 through Mod DB and GOG.com.
- QDOOM, an add-on for Quake that allows players to experience the first episode of Doom within the Quake engine, featuring enemies from both games. It was released by Bethesda in December 2023 to commemorate the 30th anniversary of Doom.
- Voidwalker, a new standalone science fiction first-person shooter currently under development.

== See also ==
- Doom modding
- Fallout: Bakersfield
- Brutal Doom
- List of crossovers in video games
