= Dusk (video game) =

2018 video game

- Developer: David Szymanski
- Publisher: New Blood Interactive
- Producer: Dave Oshry
- Composer: Andrew Hulshult
- Engine: Unity
- Platforms: Windows; Linux; macOS; Nintendo Switch; PlayStation 4; Xbox Series X/S
- Release: Windows; December 10, 2018; Linux, macOS; February 6, 2019; Nintendo Switch; October 28, 2021; PlayStation 4; October 31, 2023; Xbox Series X/S; October 31, 2025
- Genre: First-person shooter
- Modes: Single-player, multiplayer

Dusk is a 2018 first-person shooter game created by American developer David Szymanski and published by New Blood Interactive for Windows, Linux, macOS, PlayStation 4, Nintendo Switch, and Xbox Series X/S. The game is produced by Dave Oshry, who previously co-directed the 2013 remake of Rise of the Triad. The game received positive reviews for its retro gameplay, dark atmosphere, and throwback graphical design.

== Plot ==
Dusk takes place in and around the fictitious rural town of Dusk, Pennsylvania. A huge network of "Lovecraftian ruins" is discovered underneath a section of farmland, which attracts the attention of the government. Military personnel and scientists establish research labs and factories in the town in an attempt to harness the magic of the ruins. Much of the research team soon fall victim to a series of demonic possessions and industrial disasters, which force the remnants of the team out of the town. A large perimeter wall is built around the town, sealing it off from the outside world. The player takes the role of a nameless treasure hunter ("Dusk Dude" or "The Intruder"), who has heard rumors that hidden riches exist within the sealed town. The treasure hunter is apprehended by the town's denizens, brought to a secluded farmhouse, and impaled onto a meathook.

The Foothills, the first episode, is largely set in the country outskirts around Dusk's perimeter wall. After the protagonist escapes from the farmhouse, he travels across a variety of rural environments such as swamps, barnyards, cornfields, and sawmills. After breaching the perimeter wall and entering the town, the protagonist uncovers an underground passageway, which ultimately leads him to an industrial zone on the outskirts of the city.

In the second episode, The Facilities, the player must fight through the remnants of the possessed military and science personnel, who guard an array of occult machines within the industrial zone. In the penultimate level of the episode, it is revealed that the machines extract power from the minced remains of slaughtered humans. Deep in the ruins of the industrial complex, the protagonist finds an otherworldly portal, which he activates and walks through.

In the third and final episode, The Nameless City, the protagonist finds himself in a nightmarish dimension. After passing through a cathedral, he travels through various locations and is forced into a trial that takes place within a corrupted version of his own memories. In the end, the protagonist confronts and defeats the cult's leader, named Jakob, who in turn is killed by his followers. As he attempts to leave Jakob's lair, the protagonist finds himself trapped by the one responsible for everything that has occurred: the Outer God whom Jakob served under and the source of the cult's power, known as Nyarlathotep. A final battle ensues, and as the protagonist is able to deal the killing blow, Nyarlathotep deems him to be "worthy" and gives him his power, presumably corrupting him in the process and taking Jakob's place as leader of the cult. Nyarlathotep then places the protagonist in a kind of stasis "until [Nyarlathotep] has need of [him] again".

== Gameplay ==
The object of Dusk's gameplay is to reach the exit of the level, while surviving all hazards on the way. Such hazards include hostile enemies such as robed cultists, demonic livestock, sentient scarecrows, and possessed soldiers. The player has access to a variety of weapons, including dual-wielded sickles, dual pistols, dual single-barrel shotguns, a double-barrel "super shotgun", an assault rifle, a hunting rifle, a magic crossbow, a mortar, a magic sword, and a weapon called the "Riveter" that shoots exploding rivets. A unique mechanic of Dusk is the unlocked rotational-axis, allowing the player an additional degree of rotation whilst in midair, which grants the ability to perform front and back-flips.

The multiplayer component of Dusk, titled DuskWorld, features an online deathmatch mode which supports up to 16 players.

Dusk inherits many design staples from 1990s first-person shooters, such as non-regenerating health, greater emphasis on movement and speed, and the ability to carry a large number of weapons at once.

== Development ==
The earliest concepts for what would eventually become Dusk were conceived in the mid-2000s by lead developer David Szymanski. At the time, Szymanski only had access to computers with low-end hardware, which precluded him from playing recent video game releases; instead, he played older first-person shooters such as Half-Life and Doom. These games would ultimately become major inspirations for Dusk's gameplay.

Dusk's development began in 2015, stemming from a series of tests Szymanski created in the Unity game engine. In an attempt to emulate the visual style of Quake, Szymanski modeled a low-polygon shotgun and fixed it to a camera; from that point, development on Dusk began in earnest. The artistic direction of Dusk drew inspiration from several sources. The rural farmhouse setting of Episode 1 was inspired by the film The Texas Chain Saw Massacre, the video game Redneck Rampage, and Szymanski's own experiences of living in rural Pennsylvania. The abandoned factories of Episode 2 were inspired by the world of the S.T.A.L.K.E.R. series of video games, which takes place in an alternative reality version of Ukraine; Szymanski said that Dusk was initially to be set in Ukraine as a nod to S.T.A.L.K.E.R., prior to settling on the game's rural Pennsylvania locale. In designing Dusk's levels, Szymanski took cues from John Romero's level design in both Doom and Quake, emphasizing non-linearity and abstract geometry.

The visuals of Dusk were crafted to be evocative of 1990s first-person shooters. Through deliberate design, textures are low-resolution and have a limited palette, and both models and map geometry feature a lower amount of polygons than contemporary 3D games. Szymanski initially experienced difficulties adhering to the graphic limitations of 1990s shooters, as Unity engine continually introduced undesirable visual improvements throughout development: "[The] biggest challenge is just convincing Unity to stop doing things that make the game look better," Szymanski commented. Szymanski's next project, the 2022 video game Iron Lung, features a similar short-form horror experience with lower detail graphics as Dusk.

In January 2019, after the initial PC release of Dusk, Dave Oshry announced that the game would be receiving console ports, a physical PC release and more free content including a co-op mode, New Game+ and mod support. Mod support and an HD version of the game with updated textures were released in December 2023.

== Release ==
Pre-orders for Dusk opened in August 2017. In a nod to the episodic shareware releases of 1990s first person shooters like Doom and Quake, pre-orderers gained immediate access to the first episode of Dusk, The Foothills, in advance of the full game's release. A closed beta for DuskWorld, Dusk's multiplayer component, opened in December 2017 to selected volunteering participants.

Dusk released into early access on January 11, 2018, containing both DuskWorld and the first two episodes of the singleplayer campaign. On June 12, 2018, New Blood Interactive announced that Dusk will be released for the Nintendo Switch.

Dusk fully released out of early access on December 10, 2018, on the 25th anniversary of its inspiration, Doom.

The Switch port was released on October 28, 2021, followed by a version for PlayStation 4 on October 31, 2023, and a version for Xbox Series X/S on October 31, 2025.

== Prequel and spin-off ==
On April 1, 2021, New Blood Interactive released a seeming April Fools joke in the form of screenshots of a 2D roguelike version of Dusk. The screenshots were soon revealed to be genuine previews of a real game.

Dusk '82 ULTIMATE EDITION was released on October 22 for Halloween 2021. The game is an action/puzzler similar to Chip's Challenge, though with thematic and story elements of Dusk, and features chiptune versions of the Dusk soundtrack by Andrew Hulshult.

In December 2025, New Blood Interactive announced the spin-off game Dungeons of Dusk, a turn-based dungeon crawler RPG. The game is set between the episodes of Dusk and is planned to release in 2026.

== Reception ==
Reception

Aggregate score
| Aggregator | Score |
|---|---|
| Metacritic | PC: 88/100; NS: 88/100 |

Review scores
| Publication | Score |
|---|---|
| Destructoid | 9.5/10 |
| Game Informer | 8.75/10 |
| GameRevolution | 9/10 |
| Hardcore Gamer | 4.5/5 |
| Jeuxvideo.com | 17/20 |
| PC Gamer (US) | 89/100 |

Dusk was met with critical acclaim. The early access release of Dusk received generally positive reviews. Significant praise was directed towards the authenticity of Dusk's gameplay in relation to its 1990s progenitors, with Rock Paper Shotgun saying that the game "manages to avoid being the retro game equivalent of an observational comedy stand-up, hoping that simply jogging your memory will provide sufficient entertainment ... Dusk has too much energy to fall into that trap."

PC Gamer praised the level design of Dusk, stating that the game "is both an ode to and evolution of the greatest era of FPS level design." Following a gameplay preview of Dusk's third episode, Destructoid commented: "if the level design trend exhibited in this early state is any indication, DUSK could be in the running for one of the best FPS games ever made."

The Switch port was praised as a faithful conversion and "a nigh-on flawless iteration of an excellent game".
