= Brutal Doom =

2010 video game modification

- Developer: Marcos "Sergeant Mark IV" Abenante
- Release: August 19, 2010; 16 years ago
- Stable release: v21 / May 18, 2019; 7 years ago
- Engine: Doom engine
- Platform: Microsoft Windows, OS X, Linux, Android
- Type: First-person shooter
- Website: www.moddb.com/mods/brutal-doom

Brutal Doom is a video game mod for the 1993 first-person shooter Doom created by the Brazilian developer Marcos Abenante, known online as "Sergeant Mark IV". It adds numerous gameplay elements and graphical effects. The mod has been in development since 2010, and continues to receive new updates.

== Gameplay ==
Screenshot of the player armed with a shotgun after killing an undead soldier with it

Brutal Doom adds many gameplay features, such as blood splattering, allied Marines, an updated particle system, interactive bodies and "intestine particles"; interactive particles that enemies drop upon killed, the ability to drive vehicles such as tanks, stealth kills, headshots, and various "Mortal Kombat-esque fatality animations". Enemy AI has been revamped, with most enemies gaining new attacks and behaviors.

The mod includes new and updated guns, such as a flamethrower, the demonic Unmaker, assault shotguns, new rifle types, a grenade launcher and some weapons used by enemies, specifically a Revenant's missiles or a Mancubus' flame cannon. In addition the weapon mechanics have also changed, with certain guns requiring reloading, having recoil, and iron sights or scopes.

== Reception ==
The mod was mentioned by John Romero, who jokingly said that if id Software had released the original Doom with the features of Brutal Doom, they would have "destroyed the gaming industry", but he later mentioned on his Twitter feed that Brutal Doom "is not how doom's supposed to be played". Dominic Tarason of Rock Paper Shotgun remarked how the mod has "risen to such ubiquity that it has spawned a whole parallel mod scene of its own" and considered it "a game in its own right at this point". Andras Neltz of Kotaku said that it was "shaping up to be one of the modding greats". TechRadar called it "the most modernised, spectacular Doom mod to date". Chris Plante of Polygon called it "incredible", "stomach-churning" and "hysterical".

In 2021, Brutal Doom surpassed five million downloads on Mod DB.

=== Awards ===
Brutal Doom won the first-ever Cacoward in 2011 for "Best Gameplay Mod" and the "Mod of the Year" award by Mod DB in 2012 and 2017.

== See also ==
- Doom modding
- Bloom (mod)
- Fallout: Bakersfield
