= Means (company) =

Anti-capitalist streaming service

Means, LLC
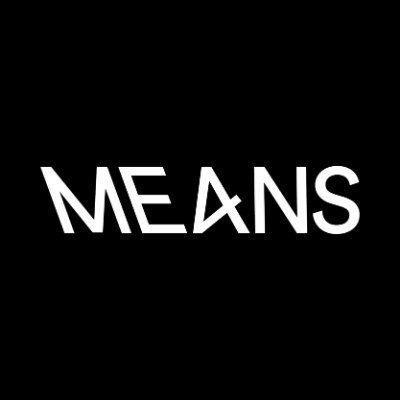
- Means TV Logo
- Company type: Worker cooperative
- Website type: OTT platform, Video game publishing
- Founded: March 21, 2019; 7 years ago
- Headquarters: Portland, Maine
- Founders: Naomi Burton and Nick Hayes
- Products: Streaming media; Video on demand
- Services: Film production; Television production; Video game publishing
- Website: means.tv
- Commercial: Yes
- Registration: Required
- Launched: February 26, 2020; 6 years ago

Means, LLC (also known as The Means Cooperative) is an American mass media limited liability worker cooperative. Means was founded in 2019 by filmmakers Naomi Burton and Nick Hayes in Detroit as an expansion of their video production company Means of Production. Means currently has two arms, a subscription-based streaming service named Means TV and a video game publishing arm via Means Interactive.

== History ==
Before founding The Means Cooperative, Burton and Hayes both worked in commercial media production for automakers in Detroit and attended Democratic Socialists of America meetings. They began to find their work morally objectionable and left their jobs to found the video production company Means of Production. Means of Production first came to prominence after producing a viral campaign ad for Alexandria Ocasio-Cortez's 2018 election campaign.

== Branches ==
=== Means TV ===
Means TV is a subscription-based video on demand streaming service owned and managed by The Means Cooperative. The service features films, documentaries, television series, an original news program called Means Morning News, and independent creators from YouTube and Twitch. The cooperative raised nearly $200,000 in its crowdfunding campaign. The full streaming service launched February 26, 2020.

Hayes has cited the anarchist podcast Street Fight as an inspiration for his decision to create Means TV, having worked with Street Fight to record live performances in 2017 and 2019. The service has variously been described as "post-capitalist", "socialist", and "leftist".

On Saturday, August 8, 2020 Hayes and Burton's home and office was attacked in a drive-by shooting. Nobody was hurt. According to Hayes, they are "not 100% sure it wasn't politically motivated." They relocated to Portland, Maine, following the shooting.

=== Means Interactive ===
Means Interactive is a video game publisher and subsidiary of The Means Cooperative. The first game published by Means Interactive is Tonight We Riot, released in May 2020 and developed by Pixel Pushers Union 512, itself a worker-owned cooperative.
