= Quake Champions =

2022 first-person shooter video game

- Developers: id Software; Saber Interactive St. Petersburg
- Publisher: Bethesda Softworks
- Director: Tim Willits
- Producers: Brandon Riffe; Matthew Charles
- Designer: Adam Pyle
- Programmer: Billy Ethan Khan
- Artist: Shinichiro Hara
- Composers: Chris Vrenna; Andrew Hulshult
- Series: Quake
- Engine: id Tech; Saber3D Engine
- Platform: Windows
- Release: August 18, 2022
- Genre: First-person shooter
- Mode: Multiplayer

Quake Champions is a 2022 multiplayer first-person shooter game developed by id Software and Saber Interactive and published by Bethesda Softworks for Windows. It is the fifth main entry in the Quake series, following 2005's Quake 4.

The game was first released in early access on August 22, 2017. On August 10, 2018, the game was made free-to-play. The game's full version was released on August 18, 2022. It ceased to receive content updates on September 23, 2026, and became a paid title with all content unlocked by default.

== Development ==
Quake Champions was announced at the Electronic Entertainment Expo 2016. The game features a large quantity of playable characters, with each having access to one or more 'passive abilities', and one 'active ability' that must be triggered by a key-press. The game was promised to be a "fast paced arena based shooter", and would not be released on consoles due to hardware limitations.

At QuakeCon 2016, creative-director Tim Willits revealed that Quake Champions does not run on the id Tech 6 game engine, but instead works on a hybrid engine made up of id Tech and Saber3D Engine, which means a number of the features seen in Doom are not native to Quake Champions, such as virtual reality, Vulkan API, SnapMaps and mod support, although mod support is potentially planned after initial release. It was revealed that Quake Champions was originally considered as an expansion to Quake Live, a revamped version of Quake III Arena released in 2010. The game went into closed beta on April 6, 2017, and was released onto Steam's early access program on August 22.

It is stated that the game would feature a free-to-play option, allowing players to play as Ranger, with additional characters available for purchase, similar to the model used in Killer Instinct.

At E3 2017, B.J. Blazkowicz of the Wolfenstein series was announced as a playable character.

At E3 2018, Bethesda announced the availability of a free-to-play trial downloadable on Steam. Players who signed up during the free trial period would be able to keep playing for free after the game launch. Early access to the game was available for purchase at $30 on Steam.

Andrew Hulshult announced on his Twitter that he will be composing new music for the game. Hulshult previously composed music for the modification Brutal Doom and Apogee Software titles like 2013's Rise of the Triad and 3D Realms' Bombshell.

During Quakecon 2018, it was announced that Quake Champions would be free-to-play and open to all players on August 10. At launch, the game made use of loot boxes containing random cosmetic items. It later transitioned to a battle pass model in December, with players earning "shards" from weekly challenges to unlock new cosmetics.

On September 23, 2026, Bethesda announced Quake Champions would no longer receive new content updates, and would transition to a paid title with the removal of all live service elements. The game would now cost $10 with all content unlocked from the start, with people who had played the game prior to this receiving the paid version at no cost.

== Reception ==
The game has been well-received by fans of the Quake series, however, the lack of modding support has disappointed many, and it failed to keep the players' attention for longer than other free-to-play games.

The game was nominated for "Fan-Favorite Shooter Game" at the Gamers' Choice Awards, and for "Best Action Game" at the Titanium Awards.

The game inspired two demakes on earlier id Tech games: Quake Champions: Doom Edition for the original Doom, and Quake Champions Classic for the original Quake.
