= BFG (weapon) =

Fictional weapon

BFG 9000
- Doom franchise element
- The BFG 9000 as depicted in Doom (1993, top), Doom 3 (2004, middle) and Doom (2016, bottom)
- Publisher: Id Software
- First appearance: Doom (1993)
- Created by: Tom Hall; Adrian Carmack; Kevin Cloud
- Genre: First-person shooter

In-universe information
- Type: Weapon
- Owners: Doomguy
- Affiliation: Union Aerospace Corporation

The BFG is a fictional weapon created by id Software. It is largely found in their first-person shooter video games Doom and Quake. The abbreviation stands for "Big Fucking Gun", as described in Tom Hall's original Doom design document and in the user manual of Doom II: Hell on Earth. The Quake II manual says it stands for "Big, Uh, Freakin' Gun". This euphemistic label implies the more profane name of the BFG. Another version of the name used in the Doom motion picture is "Bio Force Gun". The versions found in the Doom games are called "BFG 9000" and those in Quake "BFG 10K".

== Appearances ==
=== Doom ===
The weapon first appeared in the press beta release of Doom. In that version, the BFG9000 released a cloud of 80 small plasma balls (randomly green or red) per shot, which could bounce off floors and ceilings. However, it was scrapped as developer John Romero stated that it "looked like Christmas" and severely slowed the game down due to the large number of on-screen sprites.

Computer Gaming World described the BFG9000 in the first commercial Doom game as "the Ultimate Weapon". It is a large energy weapon that fires giant balls of green plasma as well as 40 invisible rays in a cone shape. The most powerful weapon in the game, it causes major damage to most types of enemies and can clear an entire room of foes in one shot, or deal huge damage to singular enemies. In the first Doom, the weapon can only be picked up in the third and fourth episodes. The BFG 9000 also appears virtually unchanged in Doom II: Hell on Earth, Final Doom, Doom 64, and Doom RPG.

=== Other versions ===
In Doom 3, the BFG 9000 is a charged weapon: holding down the trigger causes the weapon to accumulate energy before release, resulting in a more powerful shot. Overcharging the BFG will cause it to overheat and explode, killing the player instantly.

Quake II and Quake III Arena pay homage to the BFG9000 with a pair of weapons both called the BFG10K. The Quake II version fires a slow plasma ball that fires rays at any enemies in range and line-of-sight. The Quake III Arena version of the BFG fire a series of fast plasma orbs, and acts quite like the rocket launcher (rocket jumping can also be done with the BFG10K). The BFG10K from Quake III also appears in OpenArena (with a different appearance) and Quake Live (with slightly modified characteristics). Rage also pays homage to the BFG9000 with a weapon known as the "Authority Pulse Cannon", that fires "BFG Rounds".

In the Doom movie, the "bio force gun" fires a bright blue projectile that appears to burst on impact and spray a caustic substance over its target and the surrounding area.

The BFG is featured in Doom's 2016 reboot, but unlike in its first two appearances, it follows the mechanics of its Quake II rendition, firing a projectile that shoots beams at enemies. The game itself does not resolve the acronym "BFG" either in-game or in its codex entries, although one challenge in the game's final campaign level involving the BFG is called "Big [REDACTED] Gun" as a nod to the original vulgar name. In that game's pinball adaptation, it is called the "Big Fancy Gun", and is the most powerful weapon that the Doom Slayer can obtain; collecting it will grant the player an extra ball.

In 2020's Doom Eternal, a new version of the weapon, the BFG 10000, appears, as a massive interplanetary particle-beam weapon mounted on Mars' moon, Phobos, used by the in-universe organization, the UAC, to protect its control of Mars and the surrounding space. The BFG 9000 also returns as the main component of the BFG 10000, and, after the BFG 10000 is commandeered by the Doom Slayer to shoot a hole into the surface of Mars, he removes the 9000 from its socket and carries it around as a usable weapon, where it is functionally identical to the 2016 version.

In 2025's Doom: The Dark Ages, the Slayer obtains a powerful Night Sentinel weapon called the Ballistic Force Crossbow, or BFC, a large crossbow that fires Eldritch Lances and functions identically to the traditional BFG.

A similar weapon to the BFG makes an appearance in MachineGames' Wolfenstein II: The New Colossus. According to the game's plot, the weapon, named "Übergewehr" ("Super-rifle" in German), was developed by the Nazis in the 1960s. It utilizes a mixture of laser and diesel energy, as well as a mysterious third source of energy, described as “extra-dimensional microportals", possibly hinting that it is the same Argent Energy mentioned in Doom (2016) onwards.

== Reception ==
UGO.com ranked the BFG 9000 at number two on their list of top video game weapons of all time, stating "it was marvellous and complex, and we should not hesitate to put this weapon down in history as one of the best." X-Play ranked it number one on their list of top "badass" weapons, stating that while "not as fancy as the Gravity Gun", it was the first weapon that "really made us swoon". IGN also listed the BFG as one of the hundred best weapons in video games, placing it at number two, saying that "The BFG established exactly what we should expect when it comes to powerful in-game weaponry". Machinima.com named it number one on their list of top video game weapons, stating "Do you really need a reason why this tops the list?"
