= Robert Duffy (programmer) =

American video game programmer

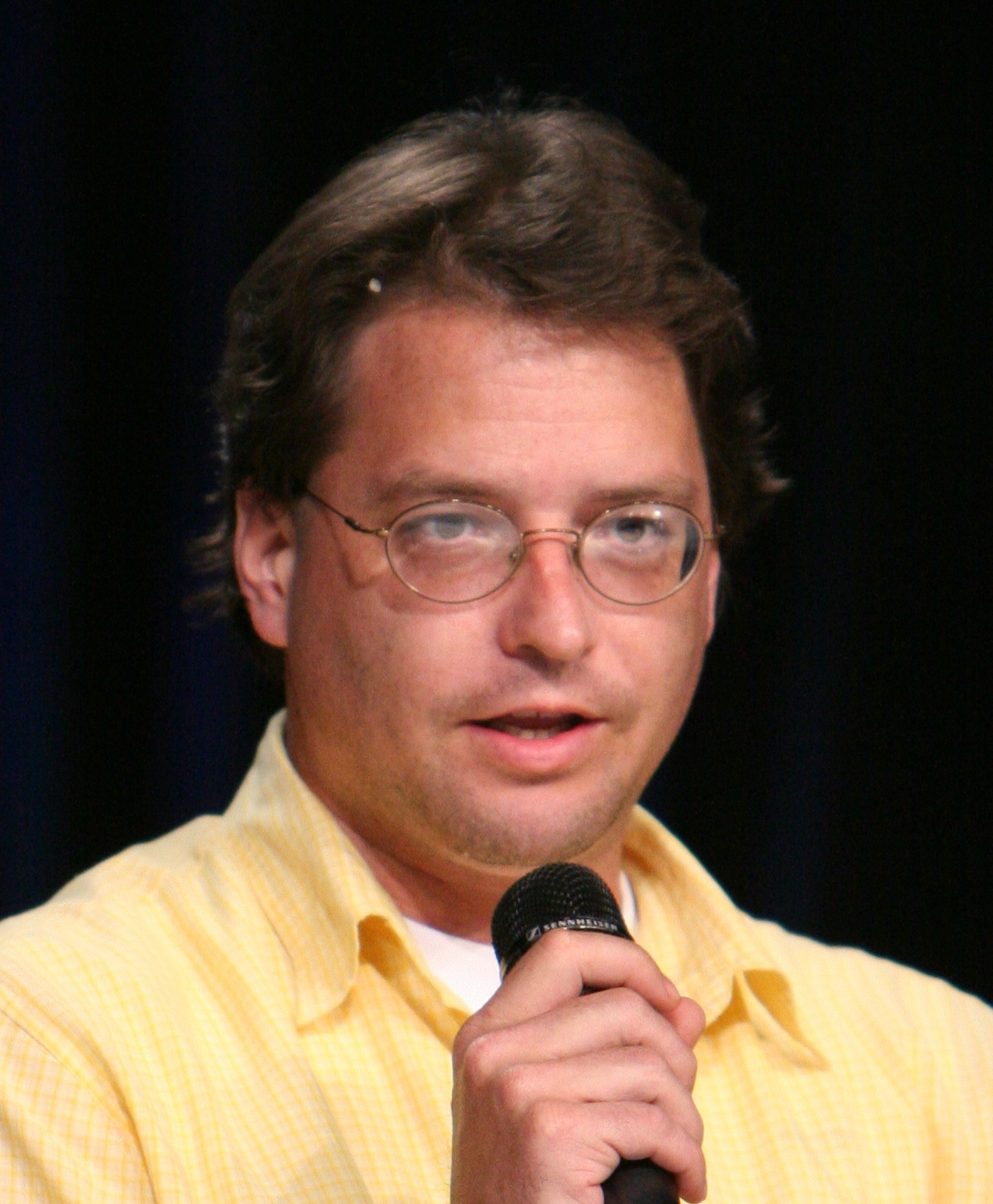
- Duffy at QuakeCon 2006
- Born: 1963 (age 62–63)
- Occupations: CTO, id Software
- Spouse: Millie Kautz Duffy

Robert Allen Duffy (born 1963) is an American video game programmer who has been working for id Software since 1999. In 1999, Duffy created the map editor for Quake III Arena. Since 2013, Duffy has been the chief technology officer of id Software.

== Credits ==
Robert Duffy's programming work consists mostly of id Software titles, ports of classics like Doom and Wolfenstein 3D are ported over to their respective platforms by other developers.

Year	Title	Credited for	System(s)	Notes
1998	Quake II Mission Pack: The Reckoning	Additional Editor Tool Programming	Microsoft Windows	Expansion pack for Quake II developed by Xatrix Entertainment
1999	Kingpin: Life of Crime	Additional Tool Programming	Microsoft Windows	Developed by Xatrix Entertainment
1999	Quake III: Arena	Programming, map editor	Microsoft Windows	—N/a
2001	Anachronox	Programming	Microsoft Windows	—N/a
2001	Quake III Revolution'	Programming	PlayStation 2	Primarily developed by Bullfrog Productions
2001	Commander Keen	Programming	Game Boy Advance	Primarily developed by David A. Palmer Productions
2001	Doom (1993)	Programming	Game Boy Advance	Primarily developed by David A. Palmer Productions
2002	Wolfenstein 3D	Programming	Game Boy Advance	Primarily developed by Stalker Entertainment
2004	Doom 3	Lead Programming	Microsoft Windows, Linux, Xbox	—N/a
2005	Quake 4	Programming	Microsoft Windows	Primarily developed by Raven Software
2007	Enemy Territory: Quake Wars	Programming	Primarily developed by Splash Damage	
2011	Rage	Programming Director	Microsoft Windows, Xbox 360, PlayStation 3	
2012	Doom 3 BFG Edition	Programming	Microsoft Windows, Xbox 360, PlayStation 3	Re-release of Doom 3
2016	Doom	Chief Technology Officer	Microsoft Windows, Xbox One, PlayStation 4, Nintendo Switch	
