= Id Software =

American video game developer

id Software LLC
- Formerly: id Software, Inc. (1991–2009)
- Type: Subsidiary
- Industry: Video games
- Predecessor: Ideas from the Deep
- Founded: February 1, 1991; 35 years ago in Shreveport, Louisiana, US
- Founders: Adrian Carmack; John Carmack; Tom Hall; John Romero
- Headquarters: Richardson, Texas, US
- Number of locations: 2 (2024)
- Key people: Marty Stratton (co-studio director); Hugo Martin (co-studio director)
- Products: id Tech; Wolfenstein series (1992–2008); Doom series (1993–present); Quake series (1996–present); Rage series (2011–present)
- Number of employees: 200+ (2016)
- Parent: ZeniMax Media (2009–present)
- Divisions: id Software Frankfurt
- Website: idsoftware.com

id Software LLC (/ɪd/) is an American video game developer based in Richardson, Texas. It was founded on February 1, 1991, by four members of the computer company Softdisk: programmers John Carmack and John Romero, game designer Tom Hall, and artist Adrian Carmack.

id Software made important technological developments in video game technologies for the PC (running MS-DOS and Windows), including work done for the Wolfenstein, Doom, and Quake franchises at the time. id's work was particularly important in 3D computer graphics technology and in game engines that are used throughout the video game industry. The company was involved in the creation of the first-person shooter (FPS) genre: Wolfenstein 3D is often considered to be the first true FPS; Doom is a game that popularized the genre and PC gaming in general; and Quake was id's first true 3D FPS.

In June 2009, ZeniMax Media acquired the company. In 2015, it opened a second studio in Frankfurt, Germany. ZeniMax Media was acquired by Microsoft in March 2021. In July 2026, the majority of id Software employees were reputedly laid off.

== History ==
=== Formation ===
The founders of id Software – John Carmack, Tom Hall, and John Romero – met in the offices of Softdisk based in Shreveport, Louisiana, developing multiple games for Softdisk's monthly publishing, including Dangerous Dave. Along with another Softdisk employee, Lane Roathe, they had formed a small group they called Ideas from the Deep (IFD), a name that Romero and Roathe had come up with. In September 1990, Carmack developed an efficient way to rapidly side-scroll graphics on the PC. Upon making this breakthrough, Carmack and Hall stayed up late into the night making a replica of the first level of the popular 1988 NES game Super Mario Bros. 3, inserting stock graphics of Romero's Dangerous Dave character in lieu of Mario. When Romero saw the demo, entitled Dangerous Dave in Copyright Infringement, he realized that Carmack's breakthrough could have potential. The IFD team moonlighted over a week and over two weekends to create a larger demo of their PC version of Super Mario Bros. 3. They sent their work to Nintendo. According to Romero, Nintendo had told them that the demo was impressive, but "they didn't want their intellectual property on anything but their own hardware, so they told us Good Job and You Can't Do This". While the pair had not readily shared the demo though acknowledged its existence in the years since, a working copy of the demo was discovered in July 2021 and preserved at the Museum of Play.

Around the same time in 1990, Scott Miller of Apogee Software learned of the group and their exceptional talent, having played one of Romero's Softdisk games, Dangerous Dave, and contacted Romero under the guise of multiple fan letters that Romero came to realize all originated from the same address. When he confronted Miller, Miller explained that the deception was necessary since Softdisk screened letters it received. Although disappointed by not actually having received mail from multiple fans, Romero and other Softdisk developers began proposing ideas to Miller. One of these was Commander Keen, a side-scrolling game that incorporated the previous work they had done on the Super Mario Bros. 3 demonstration. The first Commander Keen game, Commander Keen in Invasion of the Vorticons, was released through Apogee in December 1990, which became a very successful shareware game. After their first royalty check, Romero, Carmack, and Adrian Carmack (no relation) decided to start their own company. After hiring Hall, the group finished the Commander Keen series, then hired Jay Wilbur and Kevin Cloud and began working on Wolfenstein 3D. id Software was officially founded by Romero, John and Adrian Carmack and Hall on February 1, 1991. The name "id" came out of their previous IFD; Roathe had left the group, and they opted to drop the "F" to leave "id". They initially used "id" as an initialism for "In Demand", but by the time of the fourth Commander Keen game, it opted to let "id" stand out "as a cool word", according to Romero. In September 1991, it relocated to Madison, Wisconsin. Later on April 1, 1992, it relocated to an office in Mesquite, Texas.

The shareware distribution method was initially employed by id Software through Apogee Software to sell its products, such as the Commander Keen, Wolfenstein and Doom games. They would release the first part of their trilogy as shareware, then sell the other two installments by mail order. Only later (about the time of the release of Doom II) did id Software release their games via more traditional shrink-wrapped boxes in stores (through other game publishers).

After Wolfenstein 3D's great success, id began working on Doom. After Hall left the company, Sandy Petersen and Dave Taylor were hired before the release of Doom in December 1993.

=== The end of the classic lineup ===
Quake was released on June 22, 1996, and was considered a difficult game to develop due to creative differences. Animosity grew within the company and it caused a conflict between Carmack and Romero, which led the latter to leave id after the game's release. Soon after, other staff left the company as well such as Michael Abrash, Shawn Green, Jay Wilbur, Petersen and Mike Wilson. Petersen claimed in July 2021 that the lack of a team leader was the cause of it all. In fact, he volunteered to take lead as he had five years of experience as project manager in MicroProse but he was turned down by Carmack.

=== ZeniMax Media and Microsoft ===
On June 24, 2009, it was announced that id Software had been acquired by ZeniMax Media (owner of Bethesda Softworks). The deal would eventually affect publishing deals id Software had before the acquisition, namely Rage, which was being published through Electronic Arts. ZeniMax received in July a $105 million investment from StrongMail Systems for the id acquisition, it's unknown if that was the exact price of the deal. While the two companies were open to technology sharing, John Carmack ruled out larger changes like having Bethesda use id Tech for The Elder Scrolls, or exchanging IPs to develop Doom RPGs and Fallout first person shooters. id Software moved from the "cube-shaped" Mesquite office to a location in Richardson, Texas during the spring of 2011.

On June 26, 2013, id Software president Todd Hollenshead quit after 17 years of service. On November 22, 2013, it was announced id Software co-founder and Technical Director John Carmack had fully resigned from the company to work full-time at Oculus VR which he joined as CTO in August 2013. He was the last of the original founders to leave the company.

Tim Willits left the company in 2019. ZeniMax Media was acquired by Microsoft for US$7.5 billion in March 2021 and became part of Microsoft Gaming.

In July 2026, 136 workers at id Software, around 50% of the company, were laid off as part of a mass layoff of 3,200 workers in Microsoft's Xbox division.

== Company name ==
The company writes its name with a lowercase id, which is pronounced as in "did" or "kid", and, according to the book Masters of Doom, the group identified itself as "Ideas from the Deep" in the early days of Softdisk but that, in the end, the name 'id' came from the phrase "in demand". Disliking "in demand" as "lame", someone suggested a connection with Sigmund Freud's psychological concept of id, which the others accepted. Evidence of the reference can be found as early as Wolfenstein 3D with the statement "that's id, as in the id, ego, and superego in the psyche" appearing in the game's documentation. Prior to an update to the website, id's History page made a direct reference to Freud.

== Key employees ==
- Donna Jackson – Office manager / "id mom" (1994–present)
- Marty Stratton – Director of Business Development (1997–2006), executive producer (2006–present), studio director (2019–present)
- Hugo Martin – Creative director (2013–present)

=== Former key employees ===
Arranged in chronological order:

- Tom Hall – Co-founder, game designer, level designer, writer, creative director (1991–1993). After a dispute with John Carmack over the designs of Doom, Hall was forced to resign from id Software in August 1993. He joined 3D Realms soon afterwards.
- Bobby Prince – Music composer (1991–1994). A freelance musician who went on to pursue other projects after Doom II.
- Dave Taylor – Programmer (1993–1996). Taylor left id Software and co-founded Crack dot Com.
- John Romero – Co-founder, game designer, programmer (1991–1996). Romero resigned on August 6, 1996. He established Ion Storm along with Hall on November 15, 1996.
- Michael Abrash – Programmer (1995–1996). Returned to Microsoft after the release of Quake, but eventually worked with Carmack again at Reality Labs.
- Shawn Green – Software support (1991–1996). Left id Software to join Romero at Ion Storm.
- Jay Wilbur – Business manager (1991–1997). Left id Software after Romero's departure and joined Epic Games in 1997.
- Sandy Petersen – Level designer (1993–1997). Left id Software for Ensemble Studios in 1997.
- Mike Wilson – PR and marketing (1994–1997). Left id Software to become CEO of Ion Storm with Romero. Left a year later to found Gathering of Developers and later Devolver Digital.
- American McGee – Level designer (1993–1998). McGee was fired after the release of Quake II. He joined Electronic Arts and created American McGee's Alice.
- Adrian Carmack – Co-founder, artist (1991–2005). Carmack was forced out of id Software after the release of Doom 3 because he would not sell his stock at a low price to the other owners. Adrian sued id Software and the lawsuit was settled during the Zenimax acquisition in 2009.
- Todd Hollenshead – President (1996–2013) Left id Software on good terms to work at Nerve Software.
- John Carmack – Co-founder, technical director (1991–2013). He joined Oculus VR on August 7, 2013, as a side project, but unable to handle two companies at the same time, Carmack resigned from id Software on November 22, 2013, to pursue Oculus full-time, making him the last founding member to leave the company.
- Tim Willits – Level designer (1995–2001), creative director (2002–2011), studio director (2012–2019). He is now the chief creative officer at Saber Interactive.
- Kevin Cloud – Artist (1992–2006), executive producer (2007–2023).
- Robert Duffy – Chief Technology Officer (1998–2024).

== Game development ==
=== Technology ===
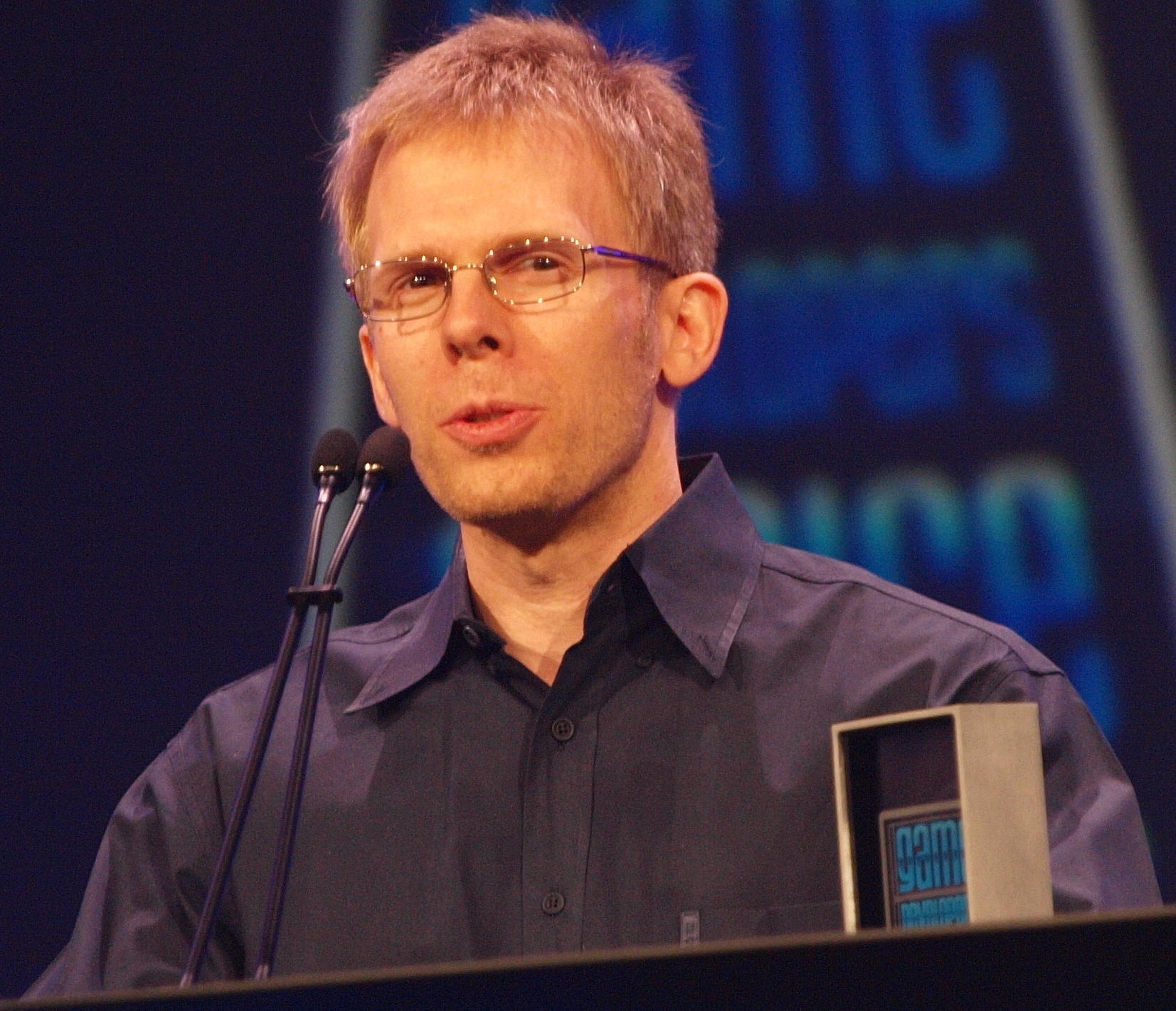
Co-founder John Carmack at the 2010 GDC

Starting with its first shareware game series, Commander Keen, id Software has licensed the core source code for the game, or what is more commonly known as the engine. Brainstormed by John Romero, id Software held a weekend session titled "The id Summer Seminar" in the summer of 1991 with prospective buyers including Scott Miller, George Broussard, Ken Rogoway, Jim Norwood and Todd Replogle. One of the nights, id Software put together an impromptu game known as "Wac-Man" to demonstrate not only the technical prowess of the Keen engine, but also how it worked internally.

id Software has developed its own game engine for each of its titles when moving to the next technological milestone, including Commander Keen, Wolfenstein 3D, ShadowCaster, Doom, Quake, Quake II, and Quake III, as well as the technology used in making Doom 3. After being used first for id Software's in-house game, the engines are licensed out to other developers. According to Eurogamer.net, "id Software has been synonymous with PC game engines since the concept of a detached game engine was first popularized". During the mid to late 1990s, "the launch of each successive round of technology it's been expected to occupy a headlining position", with the Quake III engine being most widely adopted of its engines. However id Tech 4 had far fewer licensees than the Unreal Engine from Epic Games, due to the long development time that went into Doom 3 which id Software had to release before licensing out that engine to others.

Despite his enthusiasm for open source code, Carmack revealed in 2011 that he had no interest in licensing the technology to the mass market. Beginning with Wolfenstein 3D, he felt bothered when third-party companies started "pestering" him to license the id tech engine, adding that he wanted to focus on new technology instead of providing support to existing ones. He felt very strongly that this was not why he signed up to be a game programmer for; to be "holding the hands" of other game developers. Carmack commended Epic Games for pursuing the licensing to the market beginning with Unreal Engine 3. Even though the said company has gained more success with its game engine than id Software over the years, Carmack had no regrets by his decision and continued to focus on open source until his departure from the company in 2013.

In conjunction with his self-professed affinity for sharing source code, John Carmack has open-sourced most of the major id Software engines under the GNU General Public License. Historically, the source code for each engine has been released once the code base is 5 years old. Consequently, many home grown projects have sprung up porting the code to different platforms, cleaning up the source code, or providing major modifications to the core engine. Wolfenstein 3D, Doom and Quake engine ports are ubiquitous to nearly all platforms capable of running games, such as hand-held PCs, iPods, the PSP, the Nintendo DS and more. Impressive core modifications include GZDoom, which adds to the Doom engine modern hardware accelerared renderers and a scripting system called ZScript, and was also utilized in the creation of ECWolf for Wolfenstein 3D and Raze for the Build engine. Meanwhile DarkPlaces adds stencil shadow volumes into the original Quake engine along with a more efficient network protocol. Other projects include Yamagi Quake II, ioquake3, and dhewm3, which maintain the goal of cleaning up the source code, adding features and fixing bugs. Even earlier id Software code, namely for Hovertank 3D and Catacomb 3D, was released in June 2014 by Flat Rock Software.

The GPL release of the Quake III engine's source code was moved from the end of 2004 to August 2005 as the engine was still being licensed to commercial customers who would otherwise be concerned over the sudden loss in value of their recent investment.

On August 4, 2011, John Carmack revealed during his QuakeCon 2011 keynote that it will be releasing the source code of the Doom 3 engine (id Tech 4) during the year.

id Software publicly stated it would not support the Wii console (possibly due to technical limitations), although it has since indicated that it may release titles on that platform (although it would be limited to its games released during the 1990s). They continued this policy with the Wii U but for Nintendo Switch, it collaborated with Panic Button starting with 2016's Doom and Wolfenstein II: The New Colossus.

Since id Software revealed its engine id Tech 5, it calls its engines "id Tech", followed by a version number. Older engines have retroactively been renamed to fit this scheme.

==== IMF Music File Format ====
IMF ("id music file" or "id's music format") is an audio file format created by id Software for the AdLib sound card for use in its video games. The format is similar to MIDI, in that it defines musical notes, and does not support sampled digital audio for sound effects. IMF files store the actual bytes sent to the AdLib's OPL2 chip, which uses FM synthesis to produce audio output. The format is based on the AdLib command syntax, with a few modifications. Due to the limited features and relatively low sound quality, modern games no longer use IMF music.

A large number of songs in id Software's early games (such as Commander Keen and Wolfenstein 3D) were composed by Bobby Prince in IMF format. Other game developers like Apogee Software also used this format in their games (such as Cosmo's Cosmic Adventure, Duke Nukem II, and Monster Bash).

=== Linux gaming ===
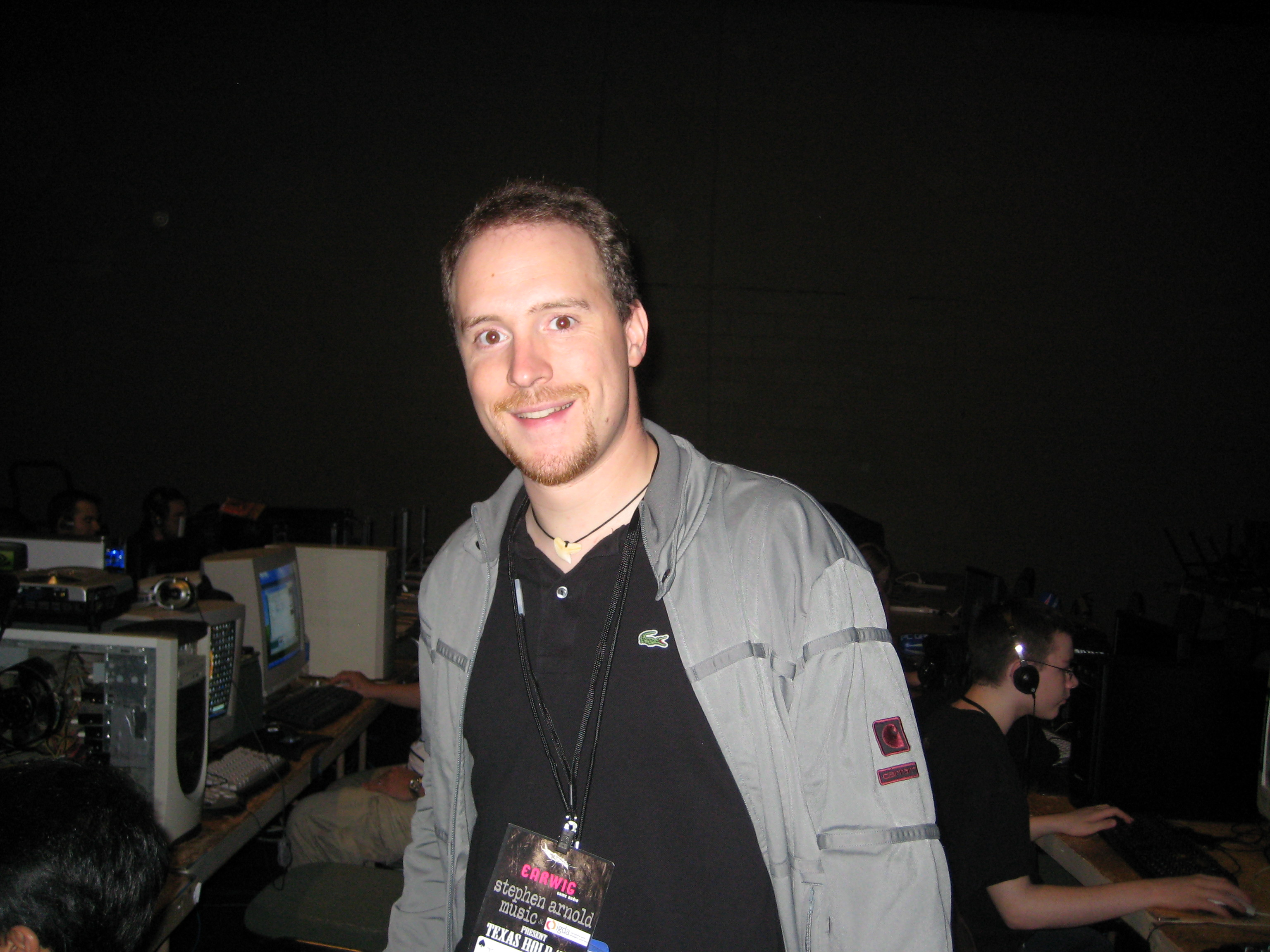
Timothee Besset was responsible for many Linux ports of id Software's games.

id Software was an early pioneer in the Linux gaming market, and id Software's Linux games have been some of the most popular of the platform. Many id Software games won the Readers' and Editors' Choice awards of Linux Journal. Some id Software titles ported to Linux are Doom (the first id Software game to be ported), Quake, Quake II, Quake III Arena, Return to Castle Wolfenstein, Wolfenstein: Enemy Territory, Doom 3, Quake 4, and Enemy Territory: Quake Wars. Since id Software and some of its licensees released the source code for some of its previous games, several games which were not ported (such as Catacomb 3D, Catacomb Abyss, Wolfenstein 3D, Spear of Destiny, Blake Stone: Aliens of Gold, Blake Stone: Planet Strike, Super 3D Noah's Ark, Rise of the Triad, Doom 64, Strife, Heretic, Hexen, Hexen II, Star Trek: Voyager – Elite Force Holomatch, Star Wars Jedi Knight II: Jedi Outcast, Star Wars Jedi Knight: Jedi Academy) can run on Linux and other operating systems natively through the use of source ports. Quake Live also launched with Linux support, although this, alongside OS X support, was later removed when changed to a standalone title.

The tradition of porting to Linux was first started by Dave D. Taylor, with Zoid Kirsch doing some later porting. Since Quake III Arena, Linux porting had been handled by Timothee Besset. The majority of all id Tech 4 games, including those made by other developers, have a Linux client available, the only current exceptions being Wolfenstein and Brink. Similarly, almost all of the games utilizing the Quake II engine have Linux ports, the only exceptions being those created by Ion Storm (Daikatana later received a community port). Despite fears by the Linux gaming community that id Tech 5 would not be ported to that platform, Timothee Besset in his blog stated "I'll be damned if we don't find the time to get Linux builds done". Besset explained that id Software's primary justification for releasing Linux builds was better code quality, along with a technical interest in the platform. However, on January 26, 2012, Besset announced that he had left id.

John Carmack has expressed his stance with regard to Linux builds in the past. In December 2000 Todd Hollenshead expressed support for Linux: "All said, we will continue to be a leading supporter of the Linux platform because we believe it is a technically sound OS and is the OS of choice for many server ops." However, on April 25, 2012, Carmack revealed that "there are no plans for a native Linux client" of id's most recent game, Rage. In February 2013, Carmack argued for improving emulation as the "proper technical direction for gaming on Linux", though this was also due to ZeniMax's refusal to support "unofficial binaries", given all prior ports (except for Quake III Arena, via Loki Software, and earlier versions of Quake Live) having only ever been unofficial. Carmack didn't mention official games Quake: The Offering and Quake II: Colossus ported by id Software to Linux and published by Macmillan Computer Publishing USA.

Despite no longer releasing native binaries, id was an early adopter of Stadia, a cloud gaming service powered by Debian Linux servers, and the cross-platform Vulkan API. A Linux version of Doom from 2016 was tested internally, while it and its sequel Doom Eternal can be run using Wine and Proton.

== Games ==
=== Commander Keen ===
Commander Keen in Invasion of the Vorticons, a platform game in the style of those for the Nintendo Entertainment System, was one of the first MS-DOS games with smooth horizontal-scrolling. Published by Apogee Software, the title and follow-ups brought id Software success as a shareware developer. It is the series of id Software that designer Tom Hall is most affiliated with. The first Commander Keen trilogy was released on December 14, 1990.

=== Wolfenstein ===
The company's breakout product was released on May 5, 1992: Wolfenstein 3D, a first-person shooter (FPS) with smooth 3D graphics that were unprecedented in computer games, and with violent gameplay that many gamers found engaging. After essentially founding an entire genre with this game, id Software created Doom, Doom II: Hell on Earth, Quake, Quake II, Quake III Arena, Doom 3 and Quake 4. Each of these first-person shooters featured progressively higher levels of graphical technology. Wolfenstein 3D spawned a prequel and a sequel: the prequel called Spear of Destiny, and the second, Return to Castle Wolfenstein, using the id Tech 3 engine. A third Wolfenstein sequel, simply titled Wolfenstein, was released by Raven Software, using the id Tech 4 engine. Another sequel, named Wolfenstein: The New Order; was developed by MachineGames using the id Tech 5 engine and released in 2014, with it getting a prequel by the name of Wolfenstein: The Old Blood a year later; followed by a direct sequel titled Wolfenstein II: The New Colossus in 2017.

=== Doom ===
Eighteen months after its release of Wolfenstein 3D, on December 10, 1993, id Software released Doom which would again set new standards for graphic quality and graphic violence in computer gaming. Doom featured a sci-fi/horror setting with graphic quality that had never been seen on personal computers or even video game consoles. Doom became a cultural phenomenon and its violent theme would eventually launch a new wave of criticism decrying the dangers of violence in video games. Doom was ported to numerous platforms, inspired many knock-offs, and was eventually followed by the technically similar Doom II: Hell on Earth. id Software made its mark in video game history with the shareware release of Doom, and eventually revisited the theme of this game in 2004 with its release of Doom 3. John Carmack said in an interview at QuakeCon 2007 that there would be a Doom 4. It began development on May 7, 2008. Doom 2016, the fourth installation of the Doom series, was released on Microsoft Windows, PlayStation 4, and Xbox One on May 13, 2016, and was later released on Nintendo Switch on November 10, 2017. In June 2018, the sequel to the 2016 Doom, Doom Eternal was officially announced at E3 2018 with a teaser trailer, followed by a gameplay reveal at QuakeCon in August 2018.

=== Quake ===
On June 22, 1996, the release of Quake marked the third milestone in id Software history. Quake combined a cutting edge fully 3D engine, the Quake engine, with a distinctive art style to create critically acclaimed graphics for its time. Audio was not neglected either, having recruited Nine Inch Nails frontman Trent Reznor to facilitate unique sound effects and ambient music for the game. (A small homage was paid to Nine Inch Nails in the form of the band's logo appearing on the ammunition boxes for the nailgun weapon.) It also included the work of Michael Abrash. Furthermore, Quake's main innovation, the capability to play a deathmatch (competitive gameplay between living opponents instead of against computer-controlled characters) over the Internet (especially through the add-on QuakeWorld), seared the title into the minds of gamers as another smash hit.

In 2008, id Software was honored at the 59th Annual Technology & Engineering Emmy Awards for the pioneering work Quake represented in user modifiable games. id Software is the only game development company ever honored twice by the National Academy of Television Arts & Sciences, having been given an Emmy Award in 2007 for creation of the 3D technology that underlies modern shooter video games.

The Quake series continued with Quake II in 1997. However, the game is not a storyline sequel, and instead focuses on an assault on an alien planet, Stroggos, in retaliation for Strogg attacks on Earth. Most of the subsequent entries in the Quake franchise follow this storyline. Quake III Arena (1999), the next title in the series, has minimal plot, but centers around the "Arena Eternal", a gladiatorial setting created by an alien race known as the Vadrigar and populated by combatants plucked from various points in time and space. Among these combatants are some characters either drawn from or based on those in Doom ("Doomguy"), Quake (Ranger, Wrack), and Quake II (Bitterman, Tank Jr., Grunt, Stripe). Quake IV (2005) picks up where Quake II left off – finishing the war between the humans and Strogg. The spin-off Enemy Territory: Quake Wars acts as a prequel to Quake II, when the Strogg first invade Earth. Quake IV and Enemy Territory: Quake Wars were made by outside developers and not id.

There have also been other spin-offs such as Quake Mobile in 2005 and Quake Live, a web browser based modification of Quake III. A game called Quake Arena DS was planned and canceled for the Nintendo DS. John Carmack stated, at QuakeCon 2007, that the id Tech 5 engine would be used for a new Quake game.

=== Rage ===
Todd Hollenshead announced in May 2007 that id Software had begun working on an all new series that would be using a new engine. Hollenshead also mentioned that the title would be completely developed in-house, marking the first game since 2004's Doom 3 to be done so. At 2007's WWDC, John Carmack showed the new engine called id Tech 5. Later that year, at QuakeCon 2007, the title of the new game was revealed as Rage.

On July 14, 2008, id Software announced at the 2008 E3 event that it would be publishing Rage through Electronic Arts, and not id's longtime publisher Activision. However, since then ZeniMax has also announced that it is publishing Rage through Bethesda Softworks.

On August 12, 2010, during Quakecon 2010, id Software announced Rage US ship date of September 13, 2011, and a European ship date of September 15, 2011. During the keynote, id Software also demonstrated a Rage spin-off title running on the iPhone. This technology demo later became Rage HD. The game was ultimately released in October 2011.

On May 14, 2018, Bethesda Softworks announced Rage 2, a co-development between id Software and Avalanche Studios.

=== Other games ===
Screenshot of a Commander Keen game, Keen Must Die!

A screenshot from the first episode of Doom

During its early days, id Software produced much more varied games; these include the early 3D first-person shooter experiments that led to Wolfenstein 3D and Doom – Hovertank 3D and Catacomb 3D. There was also the Rescue Rover series, which had two games – Rescue Rover and Rescue Rover 2. Also there was John Romero's Dangerous Dave series, which included such notables as the tech demo (In Copyright Infringement) which led to the Commander Keen engine, and the decently popular Dangerous Dave in the Haunted Mansion. In the Haunted Mansion was powered by the same engine as the earlier id Software game Shadow Knights, which was one of the several games written by id Software to fulfill its contractual obligation to produce games for Softdisk, where the id Software founders had been employed. id Software has also overseen several games using its technology that were not made in one of its IPs such as ShadowCaster (pre-Doom engine), Heretic, Hexen: Beyond Heretic (Doom engine), Hexen II (Quake engine), and Orcs and Elves (Doom RPG engine).

== Other media ==
id Software has also published novels based on the Doom series Doom novels. After a brief hiatus from publishing, id resumed and re-launched the novel series in 2008 with Matthew J. Costello's (a story consultant for Doom 3 and now Rage) new Doom 3 novels: Worlds on Fire and Maelstrom.

id Software became involved in film development when it oversaw the film adaption of its Doom franchise in 2005. In August 2007, Todd Hollenshead stated at QuakeCon 2007 that a Return to Castle Wolfenstein movie is in development which re-teams the Silent Hill writer/producer team, Roger Avary as writer and director and Samuel Hadida as producer. A new Doom film, titled Doom: Annihilation, was released in 2019, although id itself stressed its lack of involvement.

== Controversy ==
id Software was the target of controversy over two of its most popular games, Doom and the earlier Wolfenstein 3D. More recently in 2022, id Software found themselves mired in a controversy concerning libel against Doom Eternal's composer.

=== Doom ===
Doom was notorious for its high levels of gore and occultism along with satanic imagery, which generated controversy from a broad range of groups. Yahoo! Games listed it as one of the top ten most controversial games of all time.

The game again sparked controversy throughout a period of school shootings in the United States when it was found that Eric Harris and Dylan Klebold, who committed the Columbine High School massacre in 1999, were avid players of the game. While planning for the massacre, Harris said that the killing would be "like playing Doom", and "it'll be like the LA riots, the Oklahoma bombing, World War II, Vietnam, Duke Nukem and Doom all mixed together", and that his shotgun was "straight out of the game". A rumor spread afterwards that Harris had designed a Doom level that looked like the high school, populated with representations of Harris's classmates and teachers, and that Harris practiced for his role in the shootings by playing the level over and over. Although Harris did design Doom levels, none of them were based on Columbine High School.

While Doom and other violent video games have been blamed for nationally covered school shootings, 2008 research featured by Greater Good Science Center shows that the two are not closely related. Harvard Medical School researchers Cheryl Olson and Lawrence Kutner found that violent video games did not correlate to school shootings. The United States Secret Service and United States Department of Education analyzed 37 incidents of school violence and sought to develop a profile of school shooters; they discovered that the most common traits among shooters were that they were male and had histories of depression and attempted suicide. While many of the killers—like the vast majority of young teenage boys—did play video games, this study did not find a relationship between gameplay and school shootings. In fact, only one-eighth of the shooters showed any special interest in violent video games, far less than the number of shooters who seemed attracted to books and movies with violent content.

=== Wolfenstein 3D ===
As for Wolfenstein 3D, due to its use of Nazi symbols such as the swastika and the anthem of the Nazi Party, Horst-Wessel-Lied, as theme music, the PC version of the game was withdrawn from circulation in Germany in 1994, following a verdict by the Amtsgericht München on January 25, 1994. Despite the fact that Nazis are portrayed as the enemy in Wolfenstein, the use of those symbols is a federal offense in Germany unless certain circumstances apply. Similarly, the Atari Jaguar version was confiscated following a verdict by the Amtsgericht Berlin Tiergarten on December 7, 1994. The Unterhaltungssoftware Selbstkontrolle lifted the outright ban in 2018 in favor of analysing depictions on a case-by-case basis, and the international version of the game was removed from the list of banned titles in 2019.

Due to concerns from Nintendo of America, the Super NES version was modified to not include any swastikas or Nazi references; furthermore, blood was replaced with sweat to make the game seem less violent, and the attack dogs in the game were replaced by giant mutant rats. Employees of id Software are quoted in The Official DOOM Player Guide about the reaction to Wolfenstein, claiming it to be ironic that it was morally acceptable to shoot people and rats, but not dogs. Two new weapons were added as well. The Super NES version was not as successful as the PC version.

=== Soundtrack dispute ===
In May 2020, after the Doom Eternal Original Soundtrack was released, there was a serious backlash to the Doom Eternal OST and accusations of low quality work that did not match composer Mick Gordon's usual standards. On April 19, Gordon confirmed on Twitter that it was not his work, and Marty Stratton subsequently posted on May 20 a 2,500-word open letter on Reddit blaming Gordon for everything that went wrong with the process of creating music for the soundtrack. Following this, public outcry against Gordon reached a level where he received explicit death threats and graphic messages of intent to harm him and his family. Gordon's message accounts, servers, and phones were allegedly inundated with abuse to extreme levels, seriously impacting his mental health.

On November 9, 2022, Gordon published a 14,000-word article on Medium explaining his side of the story as a defensive rebuttal of the nine outlined accusations in Stratton's post (described as "an extensive series of lies"), substantiated with various forms of evidence including photographs of emails, receipts, and file metadata to verify his claims. It included claims that Gordon had yet to receive over half of his payment for his work and awards from the soundtrack's nominations at The Game Awards 2020 Stratton had reportedly claimed to deliver on Gordon's behalf; that his name had been listed on the OST's pre-order for weeks before Bethesda had contracted him to work on it just 48 hours before the game's release; Mossholder had been composing an alternate version of the OST as early as August 2019, and in response to request from Gordon's lawyers for Stratton's Reddit post to be removed, Gordon was offered six figures in exchange for a lifetime gag order, but never the possibility of Stratton's defamatory post being removed.

On November 16, 2022, Bethesda released a statement backing Marty Stratton, Chad Mossholder, and everyone in the id software team. Their statement further claimed that they had evidence to rebut Gordon's claims, without releasing mentioned evidence, and expressed concern that his statement enticed harassment and violence towards the team.

== People ==
In 2003, the book Masters of Doom chronicled the development of id Software, concentrating on the personalities and interaction of John Carmack and John Romero. Below are the key people involved with id's success.

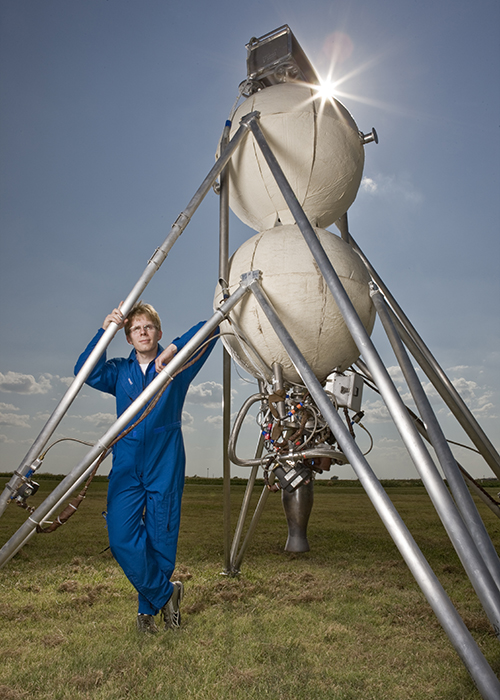
John Carmack in 2008

=== John Carmack ===
Carmack's skill at 3D programming is widely recognized in the software industry and from its inception, he was id's lead programmer. On August 7, 2013, he joined Oculus VR, a company developing virtual reality headsets, and left id Software on November 22, 2013.

=== John Romero ===
John Romero saw the horizontal scrolling demo Dangerous Dave in Copyright Infringement and immediately had the idea to form id Software on September 20, 1990. Romero pioneered the game engine licensing business with his "id Summer Seminar" in 1991 where the Keen4 engine was licensed to Apogee for Biomenace. John also worked closely with the DOOM community and was the face of id to its fans. One success of this engagement was the fan-made game Final DOOM, published in 1996. John also created the control scheme for the FPS, and the abstract level design style of DOOM that influenced many 3D games that came after it. John added par times to Wolfenstein 3D, and then DOOM, which started the phenomenon of Speedrunning. Romero wrote almost all the tools that enabled id Software and many others to develop games with id Software's technology. Romero was forced to resign in 1996 after the release of Quake, then later formed the company Ion Storm. There, he became infamous through the development of Daikatana, which was received negatively from reviewers and gamers alike upon release. Afterward, Romero co-founded The Guildhall in Dallas, Texas, served as chairman of the CPL eSports league, created an MMORPG publisher and developer named Gazillion Entertainment, created a hit Facebook game named Ravenwood Fair that garnered 25 million monthly players in 2011, and started Romero Games in Galway, Ireland in 2015.

Both Tom Hall and John Romero have reputations as designers and idea men who have helped shape some of the key PC gaming titles of the 1990s.

=== Tom Hall ===
Tom Hall was forced to resign by id Software during the early days of Doom development, but not before he had some impact; for example, he was responsible for the inclusion of teleporters in the game. He was let go before the shareware release of Doom and then went to work for Apogee, developing Rise of the Triad with the "Developers of Incredible Power". When he finished work on that game, he found he was not compatible with the Prey development team at Apogee, and therefore left to join his ex-id Software compatriot John Romero at Ion Storm. Hall has frequently commented that if he could obtain the rights to Commander Keen, he would immediately develop another Keen title.

=== Sandy Petersen ===
Sandy Petersen was a level designer for 19 of the 27 levels in the original Doom title as well as 17 of the 32 levels of Doom II. As a fan of H.P. Lovecraft, his influence is apparent in the Lovecraftian feel of the monsters for Quake, and he created Inferno, the third "episode" of the first Doom. He was forced to resign from id Software during the production of Quake II and most of his work was scrapped before the title was released.

=== American McGee ===
American McGee was a level designer for Doom II, The Ultimate Doom, Quake, and Quake II. He was asked to resign after the release of Quake II, and he then moved to Electronic Arts where he gained industry notoriety with the development of his own game American McGee's Alice. After leaving Electronic Arts, he became an independent entrepreneur and game developer. McGee headed the independent game development studio Spicy Horse in Shanghai, China from 2007 to 2016.

== Bibliography ==
- Kushner, David (2003). Masters of Doom: How Two Guys Created an Empire and Transformed Pop Culture, New York: Random House. ISBN 0-375-50524-5.
