= Will Rock =

2003 video game

- Developer: Saber Interactive
- Publisher: Ubi Soft
- Director: Andrey Iones
- Designers: Matthew Karch; Vladimir Chernysh
- Platform: Microsoft Windows
- Release: NA: June 10, 2003; EU: June 13, 2003
- Genre: First-person shooter
- Modes: Single-player, multiplayer

Will Rock is a first-person shooter video game developed by Saber Interactive and published by Ubi Soft. Released for Windows in June 2003, it was the first game developed by Saber Interactive. It received mixed reviews, with critics comparing the game unfavorably to Serious Sam.

== Gameplay ==
Will Rock is a first-person shooter, with the player having control over the main protagonist, Will Rock. The player can use 11 different weapons in combat. The single-player mode of the game has 10 levels, and there are different multiplayer modes in the game.

== Plot ==
With the aid and powers of the titan Prometheus, Will Rock rampages through Lost Olympus, seeking the safe return of his love, Emma, and revenge for the murder of his mentor, Dr. Headstrong. Prometheus, fusing his spirit into Will's able body, seeks to wage a bloody vendetta against the god Zeus, who robbed him of physical form long ago. Half mortal, half Titan, Will Rock will stop at nothing short of toppling the pillar of the gods to wreak vengeance of mythic proportions, and to save a terrified woman in the name of love. They don't have much time, though on the eve of the next thunderstorm, Zeus will be able to take a new wife and this time his sights are set on a mortal: Emma Headstrong.

== Reception ==
Reception

Aggregate score
Aggregator	Score
Metacritic	63/100

Review scores
Publication	Score
Computer Gaming World	2.5/5
Game Informer	7.75/10
GameSpot	6.7/10
IGN	7.2/10
PC Format	74%
PC Gamer (UK)	56%
PC Gamer (US)	79%
PC Zone	40%
X-Play	2/5

The game received "mixed or average" reviews according to the review aggregation website Metacritic. Chris Hudak of IGN gave the game a score of 7.2/10, praising the graphics and gameplay. GameSpot criticized the game for being a mindless knockoff of Serious Sam in a more negative review.
