= Doom 3: Maelstrom =

2009 novel by Matthew J. Costello

- Author: Matthew J. Costello
- Language: English
- Series: Doom
- Genre: Science fiction
- Publisher: Simon & Schuster
- Publication date: March 31, 2009
- Publication place: United States
- Media type: Paperback, e-book
- Pages: 336
- ISBN: 1-4165-5385-1
- Preceded by: Doom 3: Worlds on Fire

Doom 3: Maelstrom is the second book in a series of three novels based on the 2004 video game Doom 3. The book was released in March 2009. Before writing the book, its author Matthew J. Costello, wrote the scripts for Doom 3 and Doom 3: Resurrection of Evil.

== Synopsis ==
In the year 2145, a space marine assigned to the Union Aerospace Corporation research centre on Mars is one of the few survivors of a massive interdimensional invasion – an overwhelming demonic force from the mouth of Hell itself. As he struggles to survive the chaos and horror while dealing his own shock and fear, he discovers more than he could ever bargain for – the truth behind the shadowy research taking place within the very facility he is desperately trying to escape...

== Plot ==
=== 2145: Two Days Before the First Outbreak ===
The novel starts off a few days before the end of the last book, describing the actions on the undersea Ballard research lab on Earth. The novel describes that the scientists are studying a strange bacteria that allows life to live in a very inhospitable area. The base is underfunded due to the UAC's interests on Mars, and there are fears that UAC head Ian Kelliher will cancel it.

Henceforth the novel is made up of different stories about different people, but returns to each regularly. The book describes a visit by Ian Kelliher to his weak, technically retired, father and UAC founder Tommy. Tommy gives his son a warning – you are playing god on Mars City with forces you can't control. He also tells Ian that Ballard is vital, basically saving the lab.

=== 2145: Armageddon ===
The book returns to Mars just after the first demonic outbreak, with General Hayden and his compatriots trying to assure Kelliher that things are under control – while at the same time trying to make it a reality. Meanwhile, Maria Moraetes and John Kane are both leading squads with Maria near Alpha Labs and Kane at Mars City reception.

Master Sergeant Kelly, who is setting up troops near the outbreak's source of Delta Labs, talks to Kane and warns of unusual readings. Kane leaves reception to look for a child he saved from his zombified mother. Then a second outbreak breaks out, destroying and zombifying more of Mars City, and unleashing more demons.

Kane decides not to return to reception and to instead fight his way to Maria in Alpha Labs, who was trying to make her way to him. Meanwhile, Maria and Andy Kim are fighting their way through Mars City too. While fighting through onslaughts of trites, pinkies, imps and zombies (creatures they name as they go along), they are beginning to make progress. But then an imp grabs Andy and nearly kills him – only being stopped by Maria. Desperate to save her friend, but without any medical supplies, she senses an approaching presence.

There is also the subplot of Theo, the child Kane saved, who ran away as instructed and hid in a compartment. He is later sensed by two zombies and he only escapes after a hole breaks open in his compartment other than the two being penetrated by the zombies. From there he runs through the base avoiding the various horrors until he reaches a monorail – which takes him to Delta Labs.

Maria finds that it is Kane who is approaching and greets him, to Kane's surprise, with an embracing kiss. Kane uses one of his medical stim-packs to rehabilitate Andy, but not to the point of much use in combat. Maria and Kane decide that they must head to the source of the invasion – Delta. Kane argues that Maria should guide Andy back to reception but Maria is adamant that she must go with him. Andy agrees to go it alone and Maria finally wins Kane over. After resupplying at a munitions locker, the three head off on their respective journeys.

Meanwhile, Kelliher is considering his options, having lost radio contact with Mars City. He decides to contact Ballard and get them to research things that might prepare humanity for a demonic invasion – including using the bacteria in a way to make them superhuman. Glad for the newfound resources and scientists he is offering – but weary of taking up a military mission – the team agrees. He also gets his research base below UAC headquarters to try to mimic on a smaller scale what happened on Mars – in a desperate attempt to understand it. He also is debating with himself whether or not to send for the Armada military spaceships– something that top people on Mars are also debating.

Jack Campbell, one of two people sent to Mars City at Kelliher's request, is trying his best to figure out what to do. He realizes his immediate issue is to stop his other companion Elliot Swann or General Hayden from contacting the Armada, something he knows would break Mars' present quarantine and jeopardize Earth. He fights his way to the Mars City communications centre, using his powerful BFG 9000 weapon, and convinces Swann not to transmit. Campbell, joined by an unwilling and terrified Swann, then set off for Delta themselves.

=== 2145: Into Hell ===
Andy makes his way back to reception, and is greeted by Kane's appointed team leader McCullough and his marines. Meanwhile, both Maria and Kane and Campbell and Swann are approaching Delta Labs. Kane and Maria arrive first and find Delta's teleportation experiments and a lone survivor, Kellyn MacDonald. Kane is forced to use one of the experimental teleporters, the very same technology that allowed the demons to get to Mars, to reach him. This separates him from Maria.

MacDonald explains to Kane that in order to defeat the demons they need an artifact from the Martian archaeological digs sites called the U1 or soul cube. He explains how the research team discovered the history of an ancient Martian civilization that was forced to sacrifice itself to create the soul cube to defeat their own demonic invasion. Finally he reveals that Malcolm Betruger, chief Delta Labs scientist, is working for the demons and took the cube into the demon's dimension, now nicknamed as hell. Suddenly, MacDonald is killed by a sneak attack by a demon.

Kane only survives when Maria teleports in and defeats it. Then the two discover Theo, before even more demons arrive. This time deliverance comes from the arrival of Campbell and Swann – and Campbell's BFG. The four adults decide that one of them has to go through the portal into hell to retrieve the soul cube, something Kane obliges to do. Maria is sent to take Theo back to reception, and Campbell and an unhappy Swann are to guard the portal for Kane's return.

Kane arrives in the demon's realm and sees a massive and heavily guarded – but thankfully empty – throne containing the coveted soul cube. Powered by pure focus, beyond fear, beyond weariness, Kane battles the guardians and retrieves the cube, and then makes it back through the portal. There he finds Campbell and Swann dead – and a zombified and mechanically enhanced Sergeant Kelly. Kane uses the new-found artifact and retrieves Campbell's BFG. With Kelly dead, he makes his way to archaeological Site 3, to bring the soul cube back where it belongs and hopefully end the invasion.

At Site 3 a lone surviving scientist – Axelle Graulich – is making her way through a deep eerie tunnel, while the spirits of the ancient Martians reveal their secrets to her, and makes a discovery. The demons are making a permanent portal between hell and Mars, to compensate for the now closed Delta portal. Axelle is left to wonder, why is she still alive?

Kelliher watches as his scientists begin their teleportation experiment, and sees their animal test subject comes back as a zombified monster. Strange waves emanate from the lab and throughout the Earth and Kelliher is left to contemplate what this means. Meanwhile, he contacts the U.S. President and gets authorization for the Armada to obliterate Mars City.

Kane reaches Site 3 and finds the demon's portal, almost active, and Axelle who tells him that he must stop them rather than help her. Suddenly two demons arrive and kill her, but not before she warns Kane of the presence of the inhabitant of the throne he saw in hell – an enormous demon, maybe their king. Kane begins the final battle with it and its legions, with the help of the soul cube, finally persevering and sealing the portal.

Afterwards, he begins the agonizing journey back to Mars City, only for a crazed zombie to take its final revenge. Kane, severely wounded and missing a leg, is only saved by the arrival of Maria from reception. Hayden calls the Armada down to send support for Mars City.

=== Epilogue ===
Now with only stray zombies left on Mars City since the closing of the portal, the Armada troops evacuate the wounded and civilians – including Theo and Kane. Maria, Andy, other survivors, and the Armada reinforcements are left to start rehabilitating Mars City, much to Maria's regret. She vows to check up on Theo on Earth and Kane, as they both know they have feelings for each other. Everyone realizes that reviving Mars City will be a large job. Kelliher visits his father again, and vows to tell him everything, including his worries about the force that came from his experiments on Earth.

Meanwhile, the scientists on the Ballard research lab reveal their discovery that the bacteria and the tube worms are not existing in a symbiotic relationship – but that the two actually merge as one being. The team contemplate the ramifications of this biological merging and where this discovery could lead.

== Reception ==
The back of the book features two positive blurbs from the Science Fiction Chronicle and Publishers Weekly. BookBrowser noted "Readers who enjoy a creative and entertaining horror story populated with an ensemble who appear real will relish this novel."
