= Tim Willits =

Video game designer

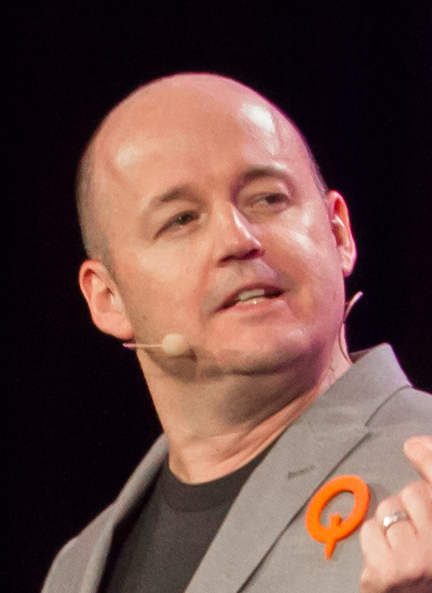
- Willits in 2016
- Born: September 13, 1971 (age 54)
- Occupations: Studio director, id Software (1995–2019); Chief creative officer, Saber Interactive (2019–present)
- Spouse(s): Unknown (before 2009) Allison Barron Willits (m. 2009)
- Children: 3

Tim Willits is the former studio director, co-owner, and level designer of id Software. As of August 2019, Willits is the chief creative officer at Saber Interactive. He became a Director of 3D Realms with Saber Interactive’s acquisition of the company.

== Biography ==
Willits is a computer science and business graduate of the University of Minnesota and a former member of the University of Minnesota Army ROTC program. Willits was the battalion cadet-command sergeant major (C/CSM) during his junior year and attended ROTC Advanced Camp at Fort Lewis, Washington during the summer between his junior and senior years of college. After an injury during the summer, Willits completed two rotations, being assigned to both the first and seventh cadet regiments during that summer. He held the rank of cadet-major (C/MAJ) during his senior year and was assigned as the battalion training officer.

=== Personal life ===
Married for the second time in 2009, Willits currently lives in a Dallas suburb with his wife, Alison Barron Willits. Together, both of them have triplets.

== Career ==
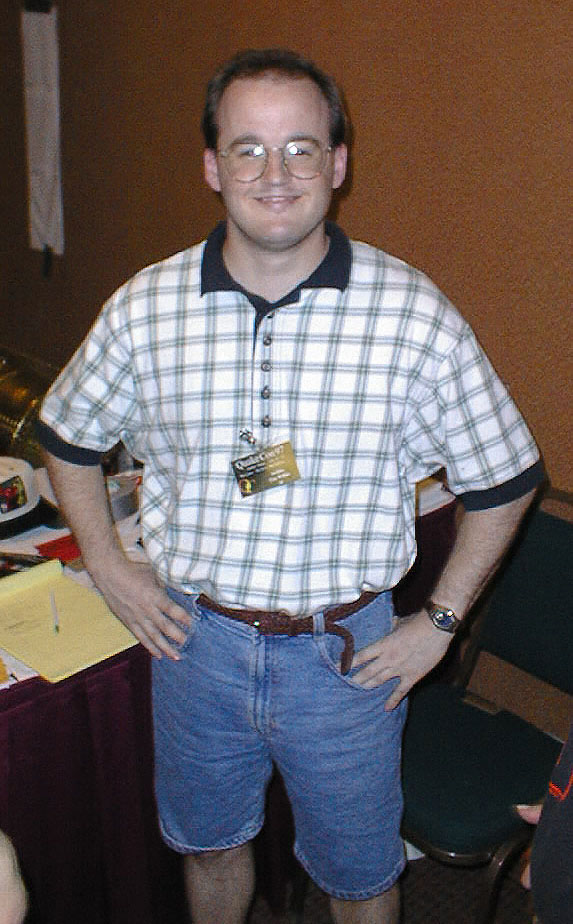
Willits at QuakeCon 1997

Willits has stated in numerous interviews that he was inspired to make video games when he downloaded a shareware version of Doom. He played the first room of E1M1, thinking that was the entire demo, then, discovering a door that led the player to the other rooms. It was that moment when the door opened that Willits decided he wanted to make video games. He joined id Software in 1995 after impressing the owners and development team with Doom levels he forged in his spare time and distributed free over the Internet. Willits has worked on Strife, The Ultimate Doom, Quake, Quake II, Quake III Arena, Quake III: Team Arena and Doom 3.

Willits was lead designer on Doom 3, and executive producer on Quake 4. He was also the creative director on Rage and Quake Live, as well as the game director on the arena shooter, Quake Champions.

Willits was the only id Software employee to attend every single QuakeCon event since its inception in 1996 until his departure from id in 2019, something of which he is proud. On July 18, 2019, Willits announced he would leave id Software after serving for 24 years. He is now the chief creative officer at Saber Interactive.

Willits was referenced in the Doom movie as Dr. Willits.

== Controversy ==
Willits received attention in August 2017 for claiming that he created the concept of multiplayer maps during the development of Quake. According to Willits, he approached coworkers John Romero and John Carmack with the idea of maps which could only be played in multiplayer, which Willits claimed the two dismissed as "the stupidest idea they'd ever heard".

The following day, Romero refuted Willits' statement on his personal blog, claiming that Willits' alleged encounter between him and Carmack never happened. Carmack said that he does not recall the conversation between Tim Willits, John Romero, and himself, and he trusts Romero's recollection of events, in line with the account detailed on Romero's blog. Romero explained that many hundreds of deathmatch-only maps had been made for Doom prior to Quake's release, including a deathmatch map created by then-id Software employee American McGee. Romero also noted that Marathon and Rise of the Triad, first person shooters which predated Quake by over a year, both shipped with maps exclusive to multiplayer. Tom Hall, co-founder of id Software and director of Rise of the Triad, gave his support for Romero. Willits responded to the article by posting an early video of a map fragment with elements of Q1DM3 shown named Tim14.bsp on his Instagram, and stated that "I stand by what I said". In January 2020, Willits was on the Arcade Attack Podcast and clarifies that when he talked about multiplayer-only maps he was specifically talking about Quake, not FPS games in general. He also added that Quake was the first FPS game that had dedicated client-server architecture for multiplayer.

Willits was interviewed by Warren Spector in 2007, giving the same account of creating the concept of multiplayer-only maps. Willits also claimed to have created all of Quake's shareware levels; this was disputed by John Romero.

== Works ==
These are the works Tim has done, which includes titles mostly from id Software:

Year	Title	System(s)	Role(s)	Notes
1995	The Ultimate Doom	MS-DOS (Note: See Official versions of Doom for full list)	Level Designer for Episode 4: "Thy Flesh Consumed"	Updated release of the original 1993 game featuring an additional episode, "Thy Flesh Consumed"
1995	Master Levels for Doom II	MS-DOS	"Attack" and "Canyon" map designer	—N/a
1996	Strife	MS-DOS	Level Designer	Primarily developed by Rogue Entertainment
1996	Quake	MS-DOS	Level and scenario designer	—N/a
1996	Hexen: Beyond Heretic	Sega Saturn	Designer	Primarily developed by Raven Software
1997	Quake II	Microsoft Windows	Level designer	—N/a
1999	Quake III Arena	Microsoft Windows	Level and scenario design	—N/a
2004	Doom 3	Microsoft Windows	Lead designer	—N/a
2005	Quake 4	Microsoft Windows	Executive producer	Primarily developed by Raven Software
2010	Quake Live	Microsoft Windows	Creative director	—N/a
2011	Rage	Microsoft Windows, PlayStation 3, Xbox 360	Studio Director and creative director	—N/a
2012	Doom 3 BFG Edition	Microsoft Windows, PlayStation 3, Xbox 360	Studio Director	—N/a
2016	Doom	Microsoft Windows, PlayStation 4, Xbox One, Nintendo Switch	Studio Director	—N/a
2017	Quake Champions	Microsoft Windows	Game and Studio Director	—N/a
2019	Rage 2	Microsoft Windows, PlayStation 4, Xbox One	Studio Director	Collaboration with Avalanche Studios
2024	Warhammer 40,000: Space Marine II	Microsoft Windows, PlayStation 5, Xbox Series X/S	CCO at Saber Interactive	announced at The Game Awards 2021
