= Doom 3 =

2004 video game

- Box art, displaying a Hell Knight
- Developer: id Software (Note: Ported to Mac OS X by Aspyr Media and Xbox by Vicarious Visions. Nvidia Lightspeed Studios developed the Nvidia Shield version. Panic Button developed the Nintendo Switch, PlayStation 4, and Xbox One versions. Archiact Interactive developed the PlayStation VR version.)
- Publisher: Activision (Note: Aspyr Media published the Xbox version. BFG version published by Bethesda Softworks.)
- Designer: Tim Willits
- Programmers: John Carmack; Robert A. Duffy
- Artists: Kenneth Scott; Kevin Cloud; Adrian Carmack
- Writer: Matthew J. Costello
- Composer: Ed Lima (Note: Theme music composed by Clint Walsh and produced by Chris Vrenna)
- Series: Doom
- Engine: id Tech 4
- Platform: Windows: Linux, Mac OS X, Xbox, PlayStation 3, Xbox 360, Nvidia Shield Tablet, Nvidia Shield TV, Nintendo Switch, PlayStation 4, Xbox One
- Release: August 3, 2004: Windows; NA: August 3, 2004; EU: August 13, 2004 Linux; NA: October 1, 2004 OS X; NA: March 14, 2005; EU: April 8, 2005 Xbox; WW: April 4, 2005 BFG Edition PS3, Xbox 360, Windows; NA: October 16, 2012; AU: October 18, 2012; EU: October 19, 2012 Nvidia Shield Tablet, Nvidia Shield TV; NA: June 4, 2015 Switch, PS4, Xbox One; WW: July 26, 2019 PlayStation VR; WW: March 29, 2021
- Genres: First-person shooter, Survival Horror
- Modes: Single-player, multiplayer

Doom 3 (Note: Stylized as DOOM³) is a 2004 first-person shooter survival horror game developed by id Software and published by Activision. It was originally released for Windows on August 3, 2004, before being adapted for Linux later that year, and ported by Aspyr Media for Mac OS X in 2005. Vicarious Visions ported the game to the Xbox, releasing it worldwide on April 4, 2005.

Doom 3 is set on Mars in 2145, where a military-industrial conglomerate has set up a scientific research facility into fields such as teleportation, biological research, and advanced weapons design. The teleportation experiments open a gateway to Hell conducted by Doctor Betruger, resulting in a catastrophic invasion of the Mars base by demons. The player controls a space marine who fights through the base to prevent the demons from attacking Mars and reaching Earth.

Doom 3 is the first game that utilizes the id Tech 4 game engine. The engine has since been licensed out to other developers, and later released under the GNU General Public License v3.0 or later in November 2011.

Doom 3 was a critical and commercial success; with more than 3.5 million copies of the game sold, it was the most successful game by developer id Software up to that date. Critics praised the game's graphics, presentation, and atmosphere, although reviewers were divided by how close the gameplay was to that of the original Doom, focusing primarily on simply fighting through large numbers of enemies. The game was followed by Resurrection of Evil, an expansion pack developed by Nerve Software, in April 2005. A series of novelizations of Doom 3, written by Matthew J. Costello, debuted in February 2008. An expanded and remastered edition, Doom 3: BFG Edition, was released in the fourth quarter of 2012. It has been ported to various platforms, including some which enable portable and virtual reality gameplay.

== Gameplay ==
=== Single player ===
Doom 3 is a story-driven action game played from a first-person perspective with occasional cutscenes in a third-person perspective. As with previous Doom games, the main objective is to successfully pass through its levels, defeating a variety of enemy characters intent on killing the player's character. Doom 3's more story-centered approach, however, means that the player often encounters friendly non-player characters, who provide key plot information, objectives and inventory items. The game incorporates ten weapons for the players use to survive, including conventional firearms such as a submachine gun, shotgun and grenades, experimental plasma weaponry, and the powerful BFG 9000 and chainsaw weapons of the Doom franchise. Enemies come in multiple forms and with different abilities and tactics, but fall into two broad categories of either zombies or demons. Zombies are humans possessed by demonic forces, who attack the player's character using their hands and melee weapons or a variety of firearms, while demons are creatures from Hell, most of which attack using claws and spines, or by summoning fireballs. The corpses of demons are reduced to ashes after death, leaving no trace of their body behind.

The player fighting a Revenant in Doom 3. The majority of the game takes place within the futuristic base.

The game's levels are semi-linear in nature and incorporate several horror elements, the most prominent of which is darkness. This design choice is not only intended to foster feelings of apprehension and fear within the player, but also to create a more threatening game environment in which the player is less likely to see attacking enemies. This aspect is further enhanced by the fact that the player must choose between holding a weapon and holding the flashlight (until the BFG editions released in 2012 made the "duct tape mod" a standard feature), forcing the player to choose between being able to see or having a readied weapon upon entering a room, which consequently leads to a more deliberate pace for the player. In addition, the levels are regularly strewn with corpses, chopped body parts and blood, sometimes used in conjunction with the game's lighting to disorient the player.

Frequent radio transmissions through the player's communications device also add to the atmosphere, by broadcasting certain sounds and messages from non-player characters meant to unsettle the player. Early in the game, during and directly after the event that plunges the base into chaos, the player often hears the sounds of fighting, screaming and dying through their radio transmitter. The ambient sound is extended to the base itself through such things as hissing pipes, footsteps, and occasional jarringly loud noises from machinery or other sources. Often ambient sounds can be heard that resemble deep breathing, unexplained voices and demonic taunting from the game's antagonists.

Early in the game, the player is provided with a personal data assistant (PDA). PDAs contain security clearance levels, allowing the player to access certain areas that are otherwise locked and off-limits. Additionally, the PDA can be used to read e-mails and play audio logs or video discs that the player's character acquires during the game. Whenever the player picks up any of the other PDAs found throughout the game, its contents are automatically downloaded to the player's own device. Other PDAs often contain e-mails and audio logs for other characters, which can provide useful information such as storage or door key codes, as well as significant plot details.

=== Multiplayer ===
Doom 3 was released with a four-player multiplayer element, featuring four game modes. However, the game's community created a modification to boost this to eight or sixteen players. The Resurrection of Evil expansion would later officially increase the player limit to eight. The four game modes are all deathmatches. The standard deathmatch game mode involves each player moving around a level, collecting weaponry and killing the other players, with the player with the highest kills when the time runs out winning. A team variation of this involves the same principle. The third game mode is "last man standing", in which each player has a limited amount of respawns, with players losing a life when they are killed. Eventually, all but one player will be eliminated from the game, leaving the survivor as the winner. The final game mode is "tournament", in which two players fight each other while the other players watch as spectators. The victor of the battle remains in the arena, facing each other player one at a time until the winner of previous rounds is defeated. The loser then moves to the spectators and the new winner remains to fight the next player. The Xbox version of Doom 3 also incorporates an additional two-player co-operative mode for the main single-player game.

As of April 15, 2010, the Xbox Live service was shut down, thus online multiplayer for the original Xbox game is no longer available.

== Synopsis ==
=== Setting ===
Doom 3 is set on the planet Mars in the year 2145. According to the game's backstory, the Union Aerospace Corporation (UAC) has grown to become the largest corporate entity in existence with near-unlimited funds and has set up a research facility on Mars. At this base, the UAC are able to conduct research into several scientific areas, including advanced weapons development, biological research, space exploration and teleportation, outside of legal and moral boundaries. As the player progresses through the game, they learn that the employees on the base are unsettled due to a large number of incidents involving hearing voices, unexplained sightings and increasing cases of paranoia and insanity, often leading to fatal accidents with the facility's machinery. Rumors regarding the nature of experiments in the UAC's Delta Labs division are especially prevalent among the base's employees.

Much of Doom 3's story and dialogue were written by author Matthew J. Costello.

=== Characters ===
There are five main characters in Doom 3. The player assumes the role of an anonymous Space Marine corporal who has just arrived on the UAC's Mars base. The player's non-commissioned officer in-charge is Master Sergeant Thomas Kelly (voiced by Neil Ross) who gives the player objectives and advice over the player's radio for the first half of the game. The antagonist in the story is Dr. Malcolm Betruger (Philip L. Clarke), the head scientist of the UAC's enigmatic Delta Labs division, who is revealed to be working in collaboration with the forces of Hell to cause the subjugation of humanity, and his demonic voice frequently taunts the player as the game progresses. The final two principal characters are Elliott Swann (Charles Dennis), a representative of the UAC's board of directors, and Jack Campbell (Andy Chanley), a space marine who acts as Swann's enforcer and is armed with a BFG 9000. Swann is sent to Mars to check up on Betruger's research and investigate the rising number of accidents on the base after a request for assistance from a whistleblower. Swann is almost always accompanied by Campbell, and the two are often shown in the game to be a few steps ahead of the player but cannot be reached and directly communicated with until late in the game. The game also incorporates a host of minor characters who add details to the story or assist the player in certain segments. The player encounters multiple scientists involved in the various research and development programs and archaeological digs through the UAC base, as well as fellow marines and security guards. Civilian employees engaged in bureaucratic work and maintenance workers are also seen.

=== Plot ===
UAC board member Elliott Swann, his bodyguard Jack Campbell, and a recently transferred Marine arrive at Mars City, the main access to the UAC's Mars base. Sent to investigate multiple incidents involving the Delta Complex, Swann has a tense meeting with facility director Dr. Malcolm Betruger while the Marine reports to Master Sergeant Thomas Kelly for orders. Kelly orders the Marine to find a scientist from the Delta Labs who has gone missing. The marine finds the scientist in a decommissioned communications facility, where he is frantically trying to send a warning to the UAC on Earth about Betruger's teleportation experiments. However, as he tries to explain the situation to the marine, another teleportation test takes place but loses containment, at which point the entire Mars base is swept with a shockwave. The forces of Hell invade through the teleporter's portal and transform most of the base's personnel into zombies.

Much of Doom 3, such as this section in the Delta Labs, was planned using storyboards.

Now forced to fend off attacks from zombified base personnel and demons from Hell, the Marine returns to Mars City, where Kelly gives him orders to link up with another squad of marines and get a transmission card containing a distress call to the main communications facility to call for reinforcements. As the Marine progresses through the base, he learns that Swann and Campbell have survived and are also en route to the communications facility to prevent any messages being sent in order to contain the situation on Mars. The marine squad is ambushed by demons and slaughtered in the EnPro Plant, and although the Marine recovers the transmission card, he is too late to prevent the bulk of equipment at the communications facility being destroyed by Campbell. However, Kelly directs the Marine to a backup system, where the Marine is given the choice of whether to obey Kelly's orders to send for reinforcements, or accept Swann's argument to keep Mars isolated until the nature of the invasion is understood, so as not to endanger Earth. The Marine is told to go to the Delta Labs by Kelly or Swann, depending on whether the transmission is sent or not.

On the way to the Delta Labs, the Marine is contacted by Betruger, who is now shown to be working in cooperation with Hell in order to invade Earth. If the Marine did not send the distress call to Earth, Betruger does so himself, hoping to use the ships bringing reinforcements to transport the demons to Earth. Betruger then unsuccessfully attempts to kill the Marine using the toxic gases in the base's recycling facilities. Upon arriving at the Delta Labs, the Marine learns of the details behind the teleportation experiments, expeditions into Hell to retrieve specimens and Betruger's increasing obsession with the tests, as well as of a xenoarchaeological dig under the surface of Mars. The dig is excavating the ruins of an ancient civilization discovered on Mars and has produced a relic known as the Soul Cube. According to a scientist the Marine finds in the labs, the Soul Cube is a weapon created by the ancient civilization to defend against the forces of Hell. The scientist also reveals that the invasion began when Betruger took the Soul Cube into the portal at the beginning of the game, depositing it in Hell. The Marine pursues Betruger through the labs, but is pulled into the main teleportation portal after being lured into a trap by Betruger.

The portal takes the Marine directly into Hell, where he proceeds to fight his way through a large number of demons to the Soul Cube, defeating its demonic guardian. The Marine is then able to reinitialize the teleportation equipment left by previous research expeditions and return to the Delta Labs. Betruger, however, tells the Marine that although the main UAC teleporter has been destroyed, Hell is opening a Hellmouth on Mars, capable of bringing millions of demons to Mars. The Marine encounters the injured Swann, who informs him that Kelly has been working with Hell for possibly the whole time, and has been transformed by the demons. Telling the Marine that Campbell has gone after Kelly, Swann gives the marine his PDA containing information on the location on the Hellmouth under the surface of Mars and says that he will try to make his way out of the base alone.

However, when the Marine catches up with Campbell in the central computer processing sector of the base, Campbell is mortally wounded; before expiring, he says that Kelly has taken Campbell's BFG 9000 weapon. Kelly then begins to taunt the marine in a demonic voice. The Marine eventually faces off with Kelly in the central computer core, revealing Kelly has become a cyborg grafted onto a tank-like base. The Marine is able to kill Kelly and takes the BFG 9000 before proceeding deeper under the Martian surface to Site 3, the archaeological dig site where the Soul Cube was unearthed. At the primary excavation site, the Marine discovers the Hellmouth, defended by Hell's mightiest warrior, the Cyberdemon. Using the Soul Cube, the Marine defeats the Cyberdemon, and the Soul Cube then seals the Hellmouth. The ending cut scene shows the reinforcements from Earth arriving at the base to discover the carnage. They find the Marine alive but discover that Swann has died from his injuries. They are unable to locate Betruger, who in the final scene is shown in Hell, reincarnated as a dragon-like demon.

=== The Lost Mission ===
The player takes the role of the last surviving member of Bravo team, which was seen being ambushed by demons in Doom 3. The Bravo team survivor is contacted by Dr. Richard Meyers (voiced by Paul Eiding), a scientist working on teleportation experiments in Exis Labs, and asked to help Meyers destroy an experimental teleportation array that was captured by the demons and is currently held deep inside Hell. The array is potentially powerful enough to send an army of demons all the way to Earth, hence Meyers' desperation to destroy it. To achieve this goal, the marine must acquire the components necessary to activate the Exis Labs teleportation system, then travel to Hell in order to destroy the teleportation array. In the epilogue, the marine is teleported by Dr. Meyers back to Mars. The reinforcements from Earth arrive to search for another marine who is still missing; eventually, they find him in the Delta Labs complex.

== Development ==
=== Production ===
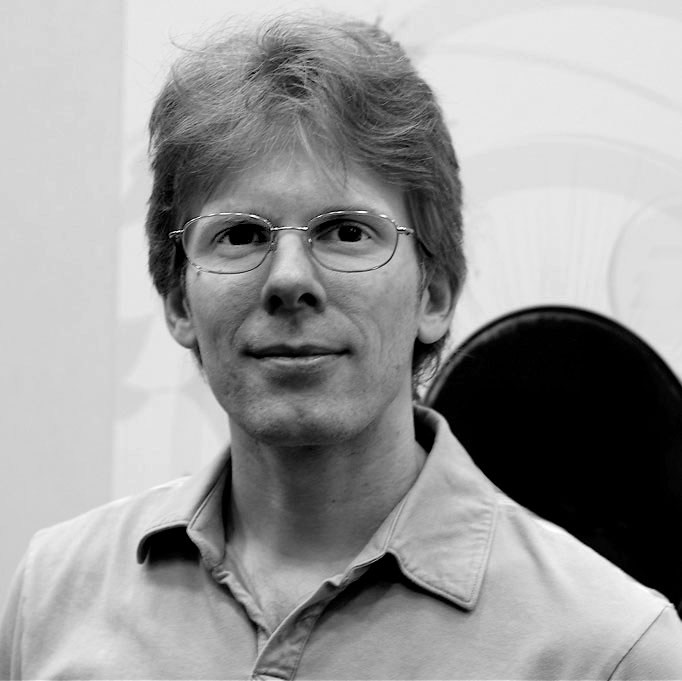
The game engine powering Doom 3 was created by John Carmack, who also spurred the initial planning of the project.

In June 2000, id Software's game engine designer John Carmack, posted an internal company plan announcing a remake of Doom using next generation technology. This plan revealed controversy had been growing within id Software over remaking Doom. Kevin Cloud and Adrian Carmack, two of id Software's owners, were always strongly opposed to remaking Doom, believing that id was going back to the same formulas and properties too often. However, after the positive reception to Return to Castle Wolfenstein and the latest improvements in rendering technology, most of the employees agreed that a remake was the right idea and presented the two owners with an ultimatum: allow them to remake Doom or fire them. After the reasonably amicable confrontation (although artist Paul Steed, one of the instigators, was fired in retaliation), the agreement to work on Doom 3 was made. id Software began development on Doom 3 in late 2000, immediately after finishing Quake III: Team Arena. The game was made by 20 to 22 people. The game's development budget was $10 million. In 2004, John Carmack estimated that the total cost was as much as $14 million. In February 2001, it was unveiled to the public by Steve Jobs (CEO of Apple at the time when it unveiled) in Macworld Conference & Expo/Tokyo 2001 along with the GeForce 3 at Makuhari Messe and was later demonstrated at E3 2002 at LACC, where a fifteen-minute gameplay demo was shown. It won five awards at E3 that year.

Early in Doom 3's development, Trent Reznor of the band Nine Inch Nails, a fan of the Doom games and composer for id's earlier title Quake, was set to compose the music and sound effects to Doom 3. However, due to "time, money and bad management", none of Trent Reznor's sound effects or music made the final product. Eventually, Nine Inch Nails' former drummer, Chris Vrenna, produced and fellow Tweaker band member Clint Walsh composed the game's soundtrack.

We never really did come to an actual agreement with Trent. The original idea was just for him to do all of the sound design for the game. I don't think Trent anticipated how long and how involved that process was and what is involved in game design versus what he does in the music and production side. It just wasn't a good mix with how much time it was going to take him, the value it was going to provide to the game, and what we could afford to pay. Trent's a popular guy. He's a rock star, and his time is valued in rock star dollars.

— Todd Hollenshead the CEO of id Software, The Making of Doom 3

Doom 3 was also intended to be more storyline-focused than previous id titles, as was demonstrated by the developers' conscious effort to have more professional voice acting. Late in 2002, two employees at ATI Technologies leaked a development version of Doom 3 onto the Internet. One year later, a new trailer was shown at E3 2003 and soon afterwards id Software's website was updated to showcase Doom 3 as an upcoming project, although it was also announced that Doom 3 would not be ready for the 2003 holiday season. According to John Carmack, the development took longer than expected. The developer Splash Damage assisted in design for the multiplayer elements of the game. Around 3,000 beta testers on site provided feedback via QuakeCon. The game's crunch period was between January and August 2004.

=== Technology ===
The shadowing effects of the unified lighting and shadowing engine applied on a group of zombies

According to John Carmack, the lead graphics engine developer at id Software, the technology of Doom 3 was supported by three primary features: unified lighting and shadowing, complex animations and scripting that showed real-time with fully dynamic per-pixel lighting and stencil shadowing, and GUI surfaces that add extra interactivity to the game. The key advance of the id Tech 4 graphics engine developed for Doom 3 is the unified lighting and shadowing. Rather than computing or rendering lightmaps during map creation and saving that information in the map data, most light sources are computed in real-time. This allows lights to cast shadows even on non-static objects such as monsters and machinery, which was impossible with static non-directional lightmaps. A shortcoming of this approach is the engine's inability to render soft shadows and global illumination.

To increase the interactivity with the game world, id Software designed hundreds of high-resolution animated screens for in-game computers. Rather than using a simple "use key" to operate these computers, the crosshair acts as a mouse cursor over the screens allowing the player to use a computer in the game world. This allows for an in-game computer terminal to perform more than one function, from operating security door codes, activating machinery, toggling lights or unlocking weapons lockers. According to the Doom 3 manual, GUI designer Patrick Duffy wrote over 500,000 lines of script code, and generated more than 25,000 image files to create all of the graphical interfaces, computer screens, and displays throughout Doom 3. Other important features of the game engine are normal mapping and specular highlighting of textures, realistic handling of object physics, a dynamic, ambient soundtrack, and multi-channel sound. Doom 3 on Xbox supports 480p widescreen video display resolution and Dolby Digital 5.1 surround sound.

== Release ==
Doom 3 achieved gold status on July 14, 2004 and a Mac OS X release was confirmed the next day. Doom 3 was released in the United States on August 3, 2004, and to the rest of the world on August 13. Due to high demand, the game was made available at select outlets at midnight on the date of release. Additionally, a Linux version was released on October 4, 2004, by Timothee Besset. The Mac OS X version was released on March 14, 2005, and on February 20, 2006, the patch 1.3 Rev A included a universal binary, adding support for Mac OS X on the x86 architecture. Finally, the modified Xbox conversion was released on April 4, 2005, featuring a limited steel book edition and two games including The Ultimate Doom and Doom II: Hell on Earth.

A week before the game's release, it became known that an agreement to include EAX audio technology in Doom 3 reached by id Software and Creative Labs was heavily influenced by a software patent owned by the latter company. The patent dealt with a technique for rendering shadows called Carmack's Reverse, which was developed independently by both John Carmack and programmers at Creative Labs. id Software would have placed themselves under legal liability for using the technique in the finished game, so to defuse the issue, id Software agreed to license Creative Labs sound technologies in exchange for indemnification against lawsuits.

During the keynote address at QuakeCon 2011, John Carmack announced that the source code for the Doom 3 engine would be released. The source code was open-sourced under the GNU GPL-3.0-or-later on November 22, 2011. It contains minor tweaks to the shadow rendering code to avoid potential patent infringement with a patent held by Creative Labs. Art assets such as 3D models, music, sound effects etc. remain subject to the EULA.

=== Downloadable content ===
On April 4, 2005, eight months after the release of Doom 3, id Software released an expansion pack for Doom 3 on Windows. The expansion, entitled Resurrection of Evil, was developed by Nerve Software, a company that had partnered with id Software on several other projects, including Return to Castle Wolfenstein and the Xbox conversion of Doom. Once again published by Activision, a Linux version was released on May 24, 2005, and an Xbox version followed on October 5, 2005. The expansion featured a new twelve-level single-player campaign, set two years after the original storyline, as well as three new weapons, one of which is geared towards manipulating the physics in the game. Several new enemy characters were also introduced. Multiplayer gameplay was enhanced, officially increasing the player limit to eight and adding new game modes such as capture the flag. Resurrection of Evil's reception was not as positive as it had been for Doom 3 but still received generally favorable reviews from the industry's critics.

=== BFG Edition ===
Cover art of the BFG Edition

A re-release of Doom 3 called Doom 3: BFG Edition, published by Bethesda Softworks, was released on October 15, 2012 in Australia, October 16, 2012 in North America, and October 19, 2012 in Europe. It features enhanced graphics, better sound with more horror effects, a checkpoint save system, support for 3D displays and HMDs, and the ability to use the flashlight while holding a weapon, in the form of a so-called "armor-mounted flashlight". Also included are the previous expansion pack Resurrection of Evil, a new single-player expansion called The Lost Mission, and copies of the original Doom (the Ultimate Doom edition with the add-on fourth episode Thy Flesh Consumed) and Doom II (with the expansion No Rest for the Living, previously available only for the Xbox 360). The versions of Doom and Doom II released with the BFG Edition have undergone cultural sensitivity censorship. PC versions of Doom 3: BFG Edition other than the GOG.com release require the Steam client and a valid Steam account for installation, play and achievements.

On June 4, 2015, Doom 3: BFG Edition was released for Nvidia Shield Tablet and Nvidia Shield TV without online multiplayer. On July 26, 2019, Doom 3: BFG Edition was released under the name Doom 3 for Nintendo Switch, PlayStation 4, and Xbox One without online multiplayer. On March 29, 2021, Doom 3: BFG Edition was released as Doom 3: VR Edition for PlayStation 4 via PlayStation VR without online multiplayer.

== Reception ==
=== Critical ===
Reception

Aggregate scores
Aggregator	Score	
Aggregator	PC	Xbox
GameRankings	87%	88%
Metacritic	87/100	88/100

Review scores
Publication	Score	
Publication	PC	Xbox
1Up.com	B+	A
AllGame	4/5	4/5
Eurogamer	9/10	
GameSpot	8.5/10	8.6/10
GameSpy	4.5/5	5/5
GameTrailers		9.0/10
IGN	8.9/10	9.3
PC Gamer (UK)	90%	
PC Gamer (US)	94%	

Awards
Publication	Award
GameSpot	Best and Worst of 2004: Best Graphics (Technical)
Golden Joystick Awards	2004 edition: PC Game of the Year, Ultimate Game of the Year

Doom 3 received a favorable reception from critics, with the PC version of the game holding an 87 percent score and an 88 percent score at the review compilation sites Metacritic and GameRankings respectively. Much praise was given to the quality of Doom 3's graphics and presentation; GameSpot described the game's environments as "convincingly lifelike, densely atmospheric, and surprisingly expansive", while PC Gamer UK described the graphics and non-player character modeling and animation as simply "flawless", stating that Doom 3 signaled the return of the Doom franchise to the forefront of the computer and video game industry, eleven years after the release of the original Doom. IGN's Dan Adams noted that the game's presentation comprised a remarkably high proportion of the game, stating that "without the atmosphere, Doom 3 is a plain shooter that hearkens back to those of the '90s." In addition, several reviewers praised id Software for making the game still look surprisingly good even on lower graphics levels.

A number of reviewers also praised the attention paid to the game's premise and setting; GameSpot's Greg Kasavin described getting "the impression that Doom 3 takes place in a fully realized world" while IGN noted that "the UAC base also has a very worn and lived-in feel that adds to the realism." Eurogamer in particular pointed out that the game's opening sequence "feels like a fitting tribute to the excellent ideas" of Valve's genre-defining Half-Life.

Many reviewers noted that Doom 3 stuck with a similar "run and gun" gameplay style that was successful with its predecessors, and the game was alternately praised and criticized for this element. Several reviews were critical of a perceived repetitiveness in gameplay after a while. In addition, the game's artificial intelligence was not regarded as particularly challenging, with GameSpot noting that "enemies follow the same sorts of predictable patterns that [players] may remember from previous Doom games" while GameSpy stated the way enemies would spawn to attack the player was "gimmicky"; the reviewer noted that players would realize that picking up a lone armor vest would cause a variety of zombies to emerge from hidden compartments in the dark. In addition, several reviewers noted that the game's methods of conveying the story were "ineffectual", compounded by the lack of an identity for the player character. Finally, the game's multiplayer was seen as lacking in innovation, with its low player limits and small number of game modes, particularly in contrast to id Software's influential Quake III Arena.

The Xbox version of Doom 3 received a similar level of critical support, holding a score of 88 percent on Metacritic and an 87.7 percent score on GameRankings. The game was praised and faulted on many of the same issues as the PC version, although the game was praised for maintaining smooth and user-friendly controls on a gamepad, as well as for including a two player co-operative multiplayer mode, which IGN described as "worth the price of admission alone." However, some criticism was directed towards slowdowns in play due to the game engine, despite being scaled down for the Xbox, still being demanding on the Xbox hardware.

GameSpot named Doom 3 the best computer game of August 2004, and later gave the game its annual "Best Graphics, Technical" prize. Computer Games Magazine nominated the game for its "Best Technology" award in 2005, which ultimately went to Half-Life 2. During the 8th Annual Interactive Achievement Awards, the Academy of Interactive Arts & Sciences nominated Doom 3 for "Computer Game of the Year", "Computer First-Person Action Game of the Year", "Outstanding Innovation in Computer Gaming", and outstanding achievement in "Art Direction", "Sound Design", and "Visual Engineering".

==== BFG Edition ====
Reception

Aggregate score
Aggregator	Score
Metacritic	(PC) 59/100 (PS3) 67/100 (X360) 67/100 (NS) 81/100

Review scores
Publication	Score
Eurogamer	5/10
GameZone	8/10
IGN	7.6/10

The BFG Edition received mixed reviews in comparison. The rework of the graphics and sound design, and inclusion of the new Lost Mission content were praised. Most criticisms were aimed toward long loading times, forced auto-saves, and a control scheme which forces the player to cycle through their weapons continuously instead of bound to hotkeys as in the original release.

=== Sales ===
Doom 3 was a commercial success for id Software. id expected to sell 4 million copies of the game. In the United States, the computer version sold 760,000 copies and earned $32.4 million (~$49.7 million in 2025) by August 2006. It was the country's 16th best-selling computer game between January 2000 and August 2006. Its computer version also received a "Gold" sales award from the Entertainment and Leisure Software Publishers Association (ELSPA), indicating sales of at least 200,000 copies in the United Kingdom. By the beginning of 2007, over 3.5 million copies of Doom 3 had been sold worldwide (compared to 2–3 million copies sold for the original Doom and 2 million for Doom II), making it the most successful project by id Software at the time.

== Legacy ==
In early 2008, a new series of Doom novels by Matthew J. Costello were published, an author who had worked on the story and scripts for Doom 3 and Resurrection of Evil; previous Doom novels had expanded the storyline of the original two Doom games. The series of books aims to novelize the story of Doom 3, with the first installment, Worlds on Fire, published on February 26, 2008. The second book in the series, Maelstrom, was released in March 2009.

The game engine for Doom 3, id Tech 4, has been licensed out for the use of other developers, such as in Human Head Studios' Prey, Raven Software's Quake 4, Splash Damage's Enemy Territory: Quake Wars, Raven Software's Wolfenstein, and Splash Damage's Brink; however id Tech 4 has not been widely licensed compared to Epic Games' Unreal Engine. On November 22, 2011, the source code of the engine was released under the GNU GPL-3.0-or-later, but the game's artwork content still remains under the EULA. A later source code drop also included the changes made for the BFG Edition, allowing the re-release to potentially be ported to other previously unsupported platforms such as Linux and OS X, and such a port was eventually released.

=== Doom (2016) ===
id Software eventually went on to release another title in the series, this time following the series' original roots in minimal storytelling and fast-paced action. Development was announced in 2008, then slated to run on the id Tech 5 engine and initially titled Doom 4. Titled just Doom and powered by the id Tech 6, the game was released in 2016 by Bethesda Softworks for Microsoft Windows, Xbox One, and PlayStation 4 with cross-platform support in its "Snapmap" multiplayer mode. A Nintendo Switch version was released in 2017. It is considered a continuation of the original Doom storyline.

== See also ==
- 2004 in video games
