= Kevin Cloud =

American video game artist

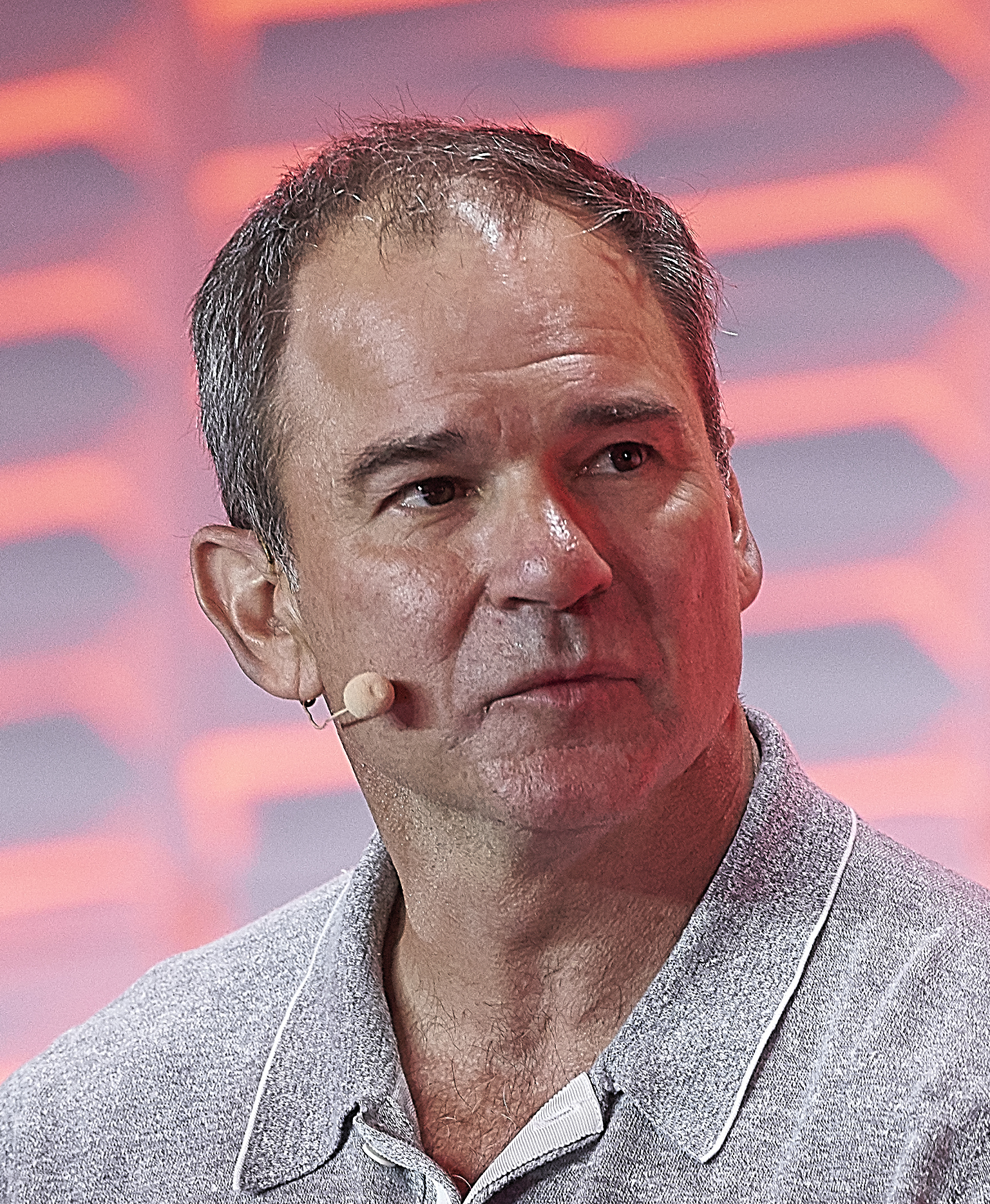
- Cloud at QuakeCon 2019
- Occupation: Video game artist
- Years active: 1985–present

Kevin Cloud is an American video game artist. He graduated from LSU-Shreveport in 1987 with a degree in political science. Cloud acquired his first full-time job as a computer artist at Softdisk in 1985. He was hired by id Software on March 10, 1992 to work as an assistant artist to lead artist Adrian Carmack, where he remained to work on popular computer games such as Wolfenstein 3D, Doom, and Quake, climbing the ranks of the company. Prior to his career at id, he was employed by Softdisk as an editorial director, where several other id founders worked. During that time he also worked as an illustrator for Softdisk's Commodore 64 disk magazine Loadstar. Cloud was an artist and co-owner of id until the ZeniMax Media merger in 2009, where he now serves as a senior producer.

== Works ==
All games Cloud has worked on were developed by id Software unless stated otherwise.

Year	Title	Credited for	Original system(s)	Notes
1992	Wolfenstein 3D	Artist and Documentation	MS-DOS	
1993	Doom	Artist	MS-DOS	
1994	Doom II	Artist	MS-DOS	
1996	Quake	Artist	MS-DOS	
1997	Quake II	Artist and Project Director	Windows	
1999	Quake III Arena	Artist	Windows	
2003	Wolfenstein: Enemy Territory	Executive producer	Windows; Macintosh; Linux	Developed by Splash Damage
2004	Doom 3	Artist	Windows	
2007	Enemy Territory: Quake Wars	Executive producer	Windows; Linux; Mac OS X PlayStation 3 Xbox 360	Developed by Splash Damage
2009	Wolfenstein	Executive producer	Windows; PlayStation 3 Xbox 360	Developed by Raven Software
2016	Doom	SnapMap Lead Producer	Windows, PlayStation 4, Xbox One, Nintendo Switch	
2020	Doom Eternal	Additional development support	Windows, Stadia, PlayStation 4, Xbox One, Nintendo Switch, PlayStation 5, Xbox Series X/S	
