= Saber Interactive =

American video game company

Saber Interactive Inc.
- Type: Subsidiary
- Industry: Video games
- Founded: 2001; 25 years ago
- Founders: Andrey Iones; Matthew Karch; Anton Krupkin
- Headquarters: Fort Lauderdale, Florida, U.S.
- Key people: Matthew Karch (CEO); Andrey Iones (COO); Tim Willits (CCO); Anton Krupkin (CTO)
- Revenue: ▲US$161.2 million (2022)
- Number of employees: 2,671 (2022)
- Parent: Embracer Group (2020–2024); Beacon Interactive (2024–present)
- Subsidiaries: See § Subsidiaries
- Website: saber.games

Saber Interactive Inc. is an American video game developer and publisher based in Fort Lauderdale, Florida. Founded by Andrey Iones, Matthew Karch, and Anton Krupkin in 2001, it is controlled by Karch's investment company Beacon Interactive, created in 2024. The company employs over 1,350 people.

Saber was initially acquired by Embracer Group in February 2020. In March 2024, amidst financial difficulties, Embracer Group sold Saber Interactive to Beacon Interactive, reverting control to co-founder Karch.

== History ==
Saber Interactive was founded in 2001 by Andrey Iones, Matthew Karch, and Anton Krupkin. Together they created a 3D engine from scratch, gathered a team of artists from Saint Petersburg, Russia, and began working on its first game, Will Rock. After the release of Will Rock, Saber developed its proprietary game engine, Saber3D, which was used in its second title, TimeShift (2007). The Saber3D engine has since been continuously updated and evolved for use in current games.

In 2010, Saber was approached by Microsoft's 343 Industries to remake Halo: Combat Evolved for the game's tenth anniversary. This would be Saber's first involvement in a major franchise and COO Andrey Iones considered it "an opportunity that we couldn't miss". To maintain the original game experience, Saber used the original engine for game play and the Saber3D engine for visuals. Halo Combat Evolved Anniversary was released on November 15, 2011, to positive reviews. Saber then assisted in 2014 on the development of Halo: The Master Chief Collection.

On August 1, 2016, Saber Interactive opened its first internal studio outside of Russia in Madrid. This was the beginning of a major international expansion, with Saber opening studios in Sundsvall, Sweden (by buying porting studio Binary Motion), and Minsk, Belarus.

CD Projekt Red partnered with Saber in 2018 on the Nintendo Switch port of The Witcher 3: Wild Hunt — Complete Edition. The port was released on October 15, 2019, to positive reviews highlighting the performance and playability.

On April 16, 2019, Saber launched World War Z. The game sold over one million units in its first week of release.

id Software studio director Tim Willits joined Saber as chief creative officer on August 1, 2019.

In October 2019, Saber Interactive acquired Bigmoon Entertainment, a game development studio of forty people based in Porto, Portugal, and rebranded the studio as Saber Porto.

Saber was acquired by Embracer Group in February 2020 in a deal worth US$525 million. Under the deal, Saber became the fifth direct subsidiary under Embracer and maintains autonomy. Post-acquisition, Matthew Karch continues to serve as chief executive officer and Andrey Iones as chief operating officer. After joining Embracer, Saber became a platform for future acquisitions of other studios.

In August 2020, Saber Interactive acquired 4A Games, the developers behind the Metro video game series and New World Interactive, the developers of Insurgency: Sandstorm. In November 2020, Saber Interactive acquired 34BigThings, Mad Head Games, Nimble Giant Entertainment, Snapshot Games and Zen Studios. Former President and CEO of id Software, Todd Hollenshead, joined Saber as Head of Publishing on November 18, 2020.

Saber and Boss Team Games announced Evil Dead: The Game during The Game Awards 2020.

In February 2021, Embracer Group announced that it acquired Aspyr and that the developer would be a subsidiary for Saber Interactive. The day one purchase price amounts to US$100 million on a cash and debt free basis, where US$60 million is paid in cash and US$40 million is paid in newly issued Embracer B shares. An additional consideration of a maximum of US$350 million may be paid under the agreement subject to certain conditions.

In June 2021, new publishing label Prime Matter announced Saber Interactive was developing a new entry in the Painkiller franchise. In that same month, Warhorse Studios announced that Saber Interactive will be developing a Kingdom Come: Deliverance port for the Nintendo Switch.

In August 2021, Saber Interactive acquired 3D Realms, Slipgate Ironworks, SmartPhone Labs, Demiurge Studios, and Fractured Byte. The following month, Saber Interactive acquired Bytex. In December of that year, Saber Interactive acquired DIGIC Pictures and Shiver Entertainment.

In March 2024, following earlier reports, Embracer Group announced that it would divest Saber Interactive by selling it to Beacon Interactive, a company owned by Karch, for US$247 million. As part of the deal, Saber Interactive retained the Saber-branded studios, 3D Realms, Digic Pictures, Fractured Byte, Mad Head Games, New World Interactive, Nimble Giant Entertainment, Sandbox Strategies, SmartPhone Labs, Slipgate Ironworks, and Stuntworks, as well as their associated intellectual properties, whereas Embracer Group kept 34BigThings, Aspyr, Beamdog, Demiurge Studios, Shiver Entertainment (later sold to Nintendo), Snapshot Games, Tripwire Interactive, and Tuxedo Labs. Beacon Interactive was also given the option to buy 4A Games and Zen Studios at a later date, but both studios ultimately stayed with Embracer Group.

In 2026, Matthew Karch admitted that some of their upcoming games used AI in creating their dialog. This came after an accusation by a former employee that she had been replaced by ChatGPT. Karch's subsequent response where he personally insulted the former employee led to increased visibility of the controversy and negative reviews for the game Rideshare "Stimulator".

== Subsidiaries ==
List of subsidiaries of Saber Interactive
Name	Location	Ref.
3D Realms	Aalborg, Denmark	
Bytex	Saransk, Russia	
Digic Pictures	Budapest, Hungary	
Fractured Byte	Tallinn, Estonia	
Mad Head Games	Belgrade, Serbia	
New World Interactive	Denver, Colorado, U.S.	
Nimble Giant Entertainment	Buenos Aires, Argentina	
Saber Armenia	Yerevan, Armenia	
Saber Belarus	Minsk, Belarus	
Saber London	London, England	
Saber Madrid	Madrid, Spain	
Saber Porto	Porto, Portugal	
Saber St. Petersburg	Saint Petersburg, Russia	
Saber Sweden	Sundsvall, Sweden	
Sandbox Strategies	New York City, U.S.	
Slipgate Ironworks	Aalborg, Denmark	
SmartPhone Labs	Veliky Novgorod, Russia	
Stuntworks	Saint Petersburg, Russia	

=== Former subsidiaries ===
- 34BigThings in Turin, Italy; founded in January 2013, acquired in November 2020, remained with Embracer Group in March 2024.
- 4A Games in Sliema, Malta and Kyiv, Ukraine; founded in 2006, acquired in August 2020, remained with Embracer Group in March 2024.
- Aspyr in Austin, Texas, U.S.; founded in September 1996, acquired in February 2021, remained with Embracer Group in March 2024.
- Demiurge Studios in Boston, Massachusetts, U.S.; founded in 2002, acquired in August 2021, remained with Embracer Group in March 2024.
- Shiver Entertainment in Miami, Florida, U.S.; founded in 2012, acquired in December 2021, sold to Nintendo in May 2024.
- Snapshot Games in Sofia, Bulgaria; founded in 2013, acquired in November 2020, remained with Embracer Group in March 2024.
- Tripwire Interactive in Roswell, Georgia, U.S.; founded in February 2005, acquired in August 2022, remained with Embracer Group in March 2024.
- Tuxedo Labs in Malmö, Sweden; acquired in August 2022, remained with Embracer Group in March 2024.
- Zen Studios in Budapest, Hungary; founded in 2003, acquired in November 2020, remained with Embracer Group in March 2024.
