= Doom 3: Worlds on Fire =

2008 book by Matthew Costello

- Author: Matthew J. Costello
- Language: English
- Series: Doom
- Genre: Science fiction
- Publisher: Simon & Schuster
- Publication date: February 26, 2008
- Publication place: United States
- Media type: Paperback, e-book
- Pages: 320
- ISBN: 1-4165-4980-3
- Followed by: Doom 3: Maelstrom

Doom 3: Worlds on Fire, released on February 26, 2008, is the first book in a planned series of three novels. Before writing the book, its author Matthew Costello wrote the scripts for Doom 3 and Doom 3: Resurrection of Evil.

== Synopsis ==
The year is 2144 and the battle over Earth's precious resources has raged for a century. With global economies in ruins and all-out world war more than a possibility, the U.S government turned to the Union Aerospace Corporation, giving it carte blanche on the legendary red planet of Mars in a desperate bid to construct an off-world outpost that might provide resources and a military advantage, as well as something so secret that even members of the government do not have a clue about it.

Special operations marine lieutenant John Kane used to be happy with his current position, before disobeying an immoral direct order. After being demoted to private, Kane has been reassigned to the "U.S. Space Marines" - the private army of the UAC - with the prospect of becoming little more than a security guard on Mars.

Now Pvt. Kane's fate leads him to Mars City - a part environmental community, part lab center that is owned and protected by the UAC. It is a strange place with a fatal environment, and the thousands who live and work within the city have already begun to think of themselves as Martians. Away from Mars City, at the strange ancient sites, an uncovered small squad of marines on the planet stand guard while scientists uncover wall glyphs and search for artifacts. They find strange inexpiable things - including the relic called "U1," nicknamed "the Soul Cube" - this strange shape will be the bringer of destructive chaos and unspeakable horror.

== Reception ==
Time magazine stated that Worlds on Fire tells the same story as the game, but noted that it did so with "surprisingly artistic tenderness".
