= Todd Hollenshead =

American video game businessman

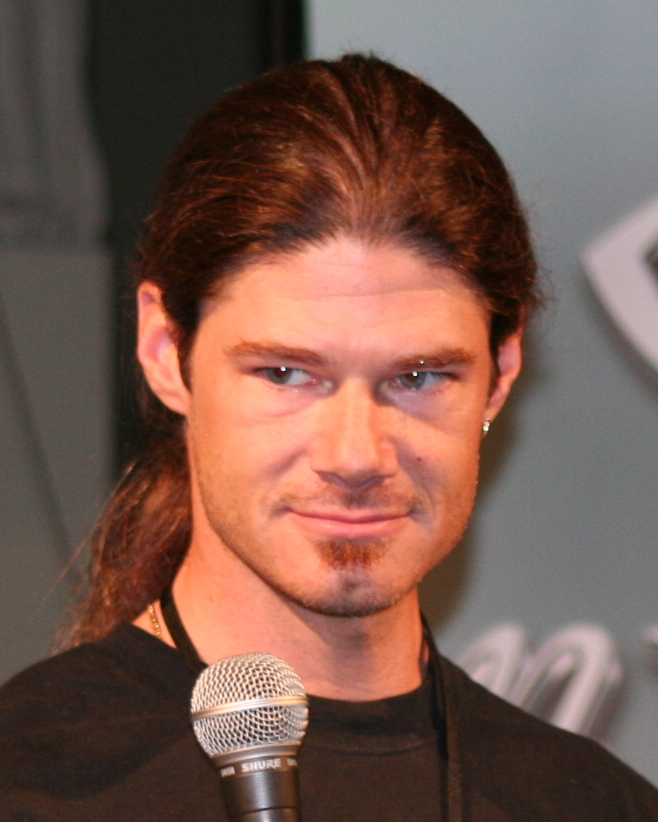
- Hollenshead at QuakeCon 2006
- Occupations: CEO/President, id Software (1996–2013); Head of Publishing, Saber Interactive (current)
- Spouse: Mihaela Plesa

Todd Hollenshead is a computer game development executive. He was President and CEO of id Software while the company released Doom, Quake, Wolfenstein 3D, and Rage. In addition to his software work, he is also known in the gaming community for his long hair and his role as master of ceremonies at Quakecon, a LAN party and gaming convention in Dallas, Texas.

Hollenshead joined id Software in November 1996. He stayed on as President of id after it was acquired by ZeniMax in 2009; he left the company in 2013.

In February 2018, Hollenshead took a leadership role at Nerve Software.

In November 2020, Hollenshead became Head of Publishing at Saber Interactive.
