= Doom (2016 video game) =

First-person shooter

- Developer: id Software (Note: Certain Affinity developed the game's multiplayer, while post-launch updates were handled by both id Software and BattleCry Studios. Escalation Studios worked on the game's SnapMap feature. Additional work by MachineGames and ZeniMax Online Studios.)
- Publisher: Bethesda Softworks (Note: Nintendo Switch version co-published by Nintendo)
- Directors: Marty Stratton; Hugo Martin
- Programmer: Billy Ethan Khan
- Writer: Adam Gascoine
- Composer: Mick Gordon
- Series: Doom
- Engine: id Tech 6
- Platforms: PlayStation 4; Windows; Xbox One; Nintendo Switch; Stadia
- Release: PS4, Windows, Xbox One; May 13, 2016; Nintendo Switch; November 10, 2017; Stadia; August 19, 2020
- Genre: First-person shooter
- Modes: Single-player, multiplayer

Doom is a 2016 first-person shooter game developed by id Software and published by Bethesda Softworks. The game is the first major installment in the Doom series since 2004's Doom 3 and is a reboot of the franchise. It was released for PlayStation 4, Windows, and Xbox One in May 2016. A port for Nintendo Switch was co-developed with Panic Button and released in November 2017, and a version for Stadia was released in August 2020. Players take the role of an ancient warrior, known colloquially as the Doom Slayer, as he battles demonic forces within an energy-mining facility on Mars and in Hell.

The game was announced as Doom 4 in 2008, and that version underwent an extensive development cycle with different builds and designs before the game was restarted in 2011 and re-revealed as simply Doom in 2014. It was tested by customers who pre-ordered the 2014 MachineGames game Wolfenstein: The New Order and the general public. Mick Gordon composed the music, with contributions by Richard Devine. The game also has an online multiplayer component and a level editor known as "SnapMap", co-developed with Certain Affinity and Escalation Studios respectively.

Doom was well received by critics and players. The single-player campaign, graphics, soundtrack, and gameplay received considerable praise, whereas the multiplayer mode drew significant criticism. It was the second best-selling video game in North America and the United Kingdom in the week of its release and sold over 500,000 copies for PCs by the end of May 2016. A sequel, Doom Eternal, was released in March 2020. A prequel, Doom: The Dark Ages, was released in May 2025.

== Gameplay ==
The Doom Slayer fighting against a Baron of Hell with the Super Shotgun

Doom is a first-person shooter. Gameplay consists of fast movement and frenetic combat against aggressive and mobile opponents, as well as exploration of the game's environments via double-jumps and ledge climbing. To progress through the game, the player wields an arsenal of weapons influenced by those of Doom and Doom II, such as a chainsaw and the BFG 9000, against demonic opponents also influenced by the original Doom games. Weapons do not need to be reloaded and can be augmented with various mods obtained during the campaign.

To replenish their resources, the player must pick up items or kill enemies. Players may recover health by using the "Glory Kill" mechanic, in which sufficiently damaged enemies enter a stunned state and may be killed by the player in a short melee animation. Ammunition can be replenished by using the chainsaw on an enemy, which instantly kills them if there is enough fuel in the chainsaw.

The single-player campaign has 13 levels, which typically have multiple pathways and open areas for players to explore and find collectibles, secrets, and upgrades to their equipment. Other pickups include Doomguy figurines and data files that expand on the setting and story. Throughout the campaign are Easter egg references to Commander Keen, The Elder Scrolls V: Skyrim, Fallout 4, Terminator 2, and the preceding Doom games. Each level contains a hidden lever which opens an area extracted from a classic level in the original games. An arcade mode in which all upgrades in the single-player campaign are unlocked from the beginning of the game was added on October 20, 2016.

=== Multiplayer ===
Doom supports an online multiplayer mode. Gamemodes include a basic Team Deathmatch and variations thereof called Freeze Tag, in which defeated players are frozen in ice and may be revived by teammates, and Soul Harvest, in which players must pick up "souls" dropped by slain opponents; Warpath, a variation of King of the Hill in which the hill moves around the map; Clan Arena, a team-based last man standing mode; and Domination, in which teams must capture and hold three locations. Players use a loadout consisting of two weapons chosen from an arsenal of weapons that may include weapons unique to the multiplayer mode. During matches, players may obtain "hack modules", one-use power-ups that convey information to the player, such as the time until other power-ups respawn. They may also obtain "runes" that temporarily transform them into demons. Playable demons include the Revenant, Baron of Hell, and Mancubus, also featured in the single-player campaign, and the Prowler and Harvester, which are not.

=== SnapMap ===
Doom includes a level creation tool called SnapMap which allows players to create and edit maps. Using in-game assets, players can create single-player levels and co-operative or competitive multiplayer maps. Players can place enemies into their maps, with the exception of the campaign's bosses, and modify their artificial intelligence and stats. Alternatively, SnapMap can automatically generate enemies for player-made maps with the AI conductor feature. Players can share their completed maps with other players, who can rate and make derivatives of their map.

== Synopsis ==
Doom takes place on Mars in 2149, where the Union Aerospace Corporation (UAC) operates a facility to exploit an energy seeping from Hell, an alternate dimension populated by hostile lifeforms known as demons. To solve an energy crisis on Earth, the UAC constructed the Argent Tower to extract and refine raw Hell energy into Argent energy, which deteriorates the physical and mental health of the facility's staff, and allowed transit to and from Hell. After discovering that Argent energy had properties that defied their understanding of physics, the UAC began occult research into Argent energy and Hell, and the demons, who its staff began to worship and cybernetically modify.

The facility is run by Samuel Hayden, a UAC scientist who transferred his consciousness to an android body after being afflicted with terminal brain cancer during the construction of the Argent Tower. In addition to directing the energy extraction and refining process, Hayden organizes expeditions into Hell to retrieve captive demons and artifacts for study. Among them is a sarcophagus containing the player character, a being they call the Doom Slayer and fear immensely, along with his armor, the Praetor Suit. Assisting Hayden is VEGA, a self-aware artificial intelligence that controls and monitors the facility. Leading the UAC's research into biomechanics is Olivia Pierce, a protege of Hayden's who developed crippling scoliosis while working on Mars and makes a pact with the demons to open a portal between Mars and Hell and allow the demons to conquer humanity.

=== Plot ===
At an undetermined time, Pierce opens the portal for the demons, who overrun the facility and kill almost all of its staff. To repel them, Hayden awakens the Slayer, who recovers his armor and initially ignores Hayden's entreaties to work together. Denied information unless he agrees to help Hayden, the Slayer acquiesces and begins to be guided by VEGA. After clearing out the facility core and preventing a meltdown in its foundry, the Slayer pursues Pierce up the tower, along the way destroying infrastructure critical to the refinement of Argent energy despite Hayden's protests. At the top of the tower, Pierce opens an explosive rift into Hell using a device called an Argent accumulator, destroying the Tower and sending the Slayer back to Hell.

In Hell, the Slayer fights his way to the tomb in which he was imprisoned and reaches a teleporter back to Mars. The Slayer makes his way to Hayden's office, where Hayden installs a teleporting device in the Praetor Suit for more reliable teleportation. Hayden also tells the Slayer of the Helix Stone, an artifact used to study and harness Argent energy, which is being housed in Pierce's office in the Lazarus Labs. Entering the Lazarus Labs, the Slayer observes the Helix Stone and learns of the Well, where the portal is powered, and of the Crucible, a magical blade. To reach the Well, he makes another excursion into Hell with the Argent accumulator within the Cyberdemon, a massive and cybernetically modified demon. After killing the Cyberdemon, the Slayer fights through a labyrinthine gauntlet and three more powerful demons to recover the Crucible.

Hayden teleports the Slayer to a facility in the frozen north of Mars that houses VEGA's core, which he plans to use to trigger an explosion powerful enough to send the Slayer to the Well. The Slayer triggers a meltdown of the core, but makes a backup copy of VEGA before the explosion. Entering the Well, the Slayer uses the Crucible to destroy the portal's power source and confronts Pierce, who is betrayed and transformed by the demons into the Spider Mastermind. Upon killing the Spider Mastermind, the Slayer is teleported back to Mars by Hayden, who tells the Slayer he has won and stopped the invasion. Hayden confiscates the Crucible to continue his research into Argent energy. To keep the Slayer from interfering with his plans, Hayden teleports him to an undisclosed location.

== Development ==
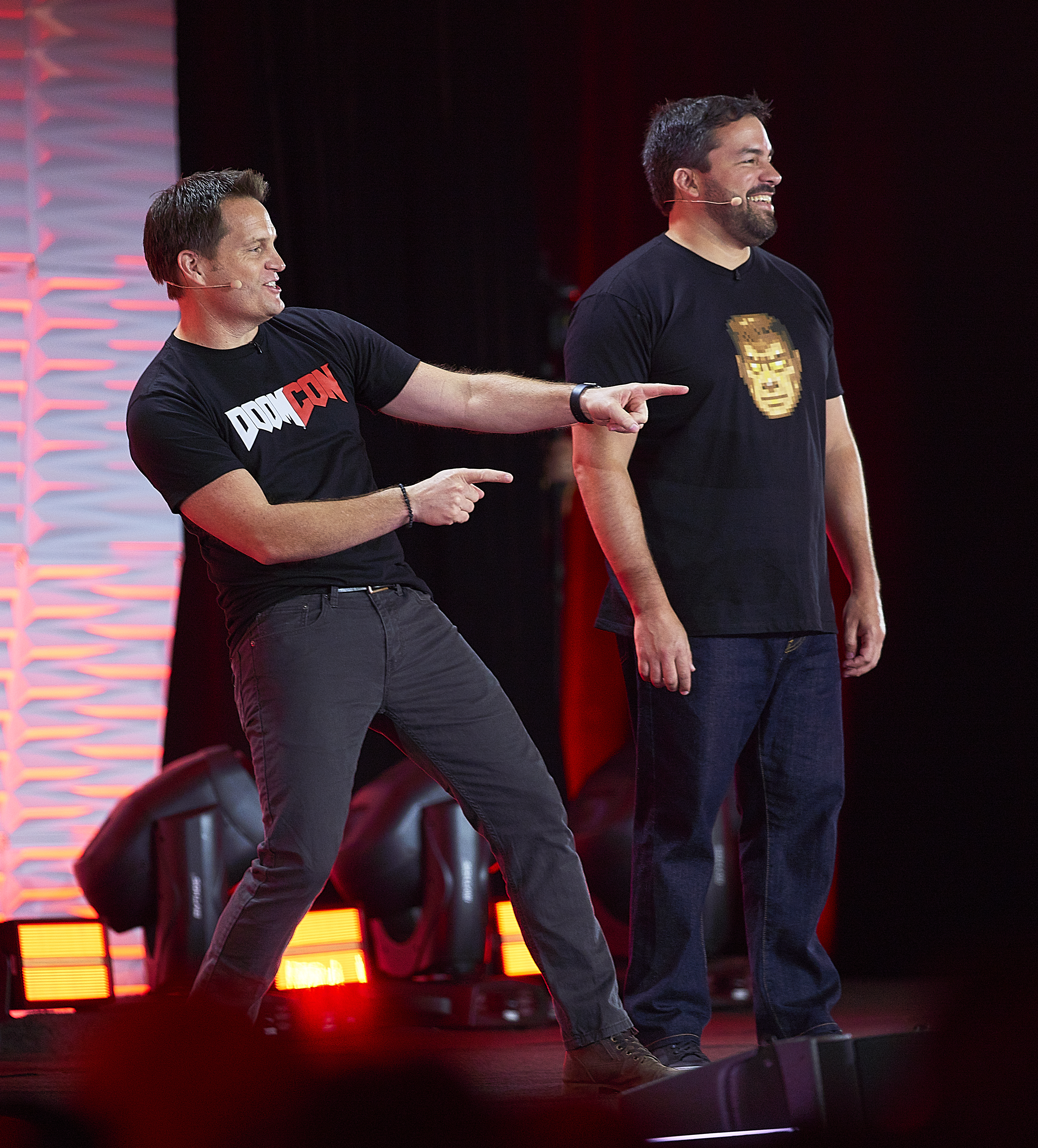
Marty Stratton (left) and Hugo Martin (right), the game's directors

=== As Doom 4 ===
After releasing Doom 3 in 2004, id Software began working on a new intellectual property, Rage, and unsuccessfully sought to license the Doom franchise to another developer as it had with Wolfenstein. In 2007, however, id began development of Doom 4. The studio, which had 19 employees at the time of Doom 3's release, struggled to simultaneously develop Rage and Doom 4. Development of Doom was first revealed via job listings on id's website on May 7, 2008, for a project titled Doom 4. On June 23, 2009, ZeniMax Media, parent company of Bethesda Softworks, acquired id and announced that Bethesda would publish its future games. According to id creative director Tim Willits, the partnership allowed the company to have two teams, each having a project in parallel development. Asked in April 2009 about whether Doom 4 would be a sequel to Doom 3 or a reboot, id CEO Todd Hollenshead stated that it was neither.

Doom 4 was intended to feature a story written by British science fiction writer Graham Joyce. The game was going to be set on Earth and was described as a "new take" on Doom II (subtitled Hell on Earth). In a 2016 video documentary by Noclip about the game's development, Doom creative director Hugo Martin described Doom 4 as being "about the global impact of a Hellish invasion" and compared it to the 1997 film Contact. The game was influenced by the Call of Duty series of first-person shooters, featuring passive health regeneration, an emphasis on using cover to protect the player character, and scripted cinematics; developers and fans derided the project as "Call of Doom". In 2011, Rage was released to mixed reception. id and Bethesda, feeling that Doom 4 was out of touch with the original games, decided to restart development.

On April 3, 2013, Kotaku published an exposé that described Doom 4 as being trapped in "development hell" and allegedly mismanaged. Bethesda's vice president of marketing, Pete Hines, acknowledged difficulty in the development of Doom 4 that same day. In an August 2013 interview with IGN, Willits said that the pre-2011 Doom 4 "had a bit of schizophrenia, a little bit of an identity crisis." Marty Stratton, Doom's director, described the period between 2011 and 2013 as a "rolling reboot". This period contained numerous departures from id such as Hollenshead and company co-founder John Carmack. In an interview by Nathan Grayson of Rock, Paper, Shotgun on August 6, 2013, Willits stated that there was no publicly available timeline for updates on Doom 4.

=== As Doom ===
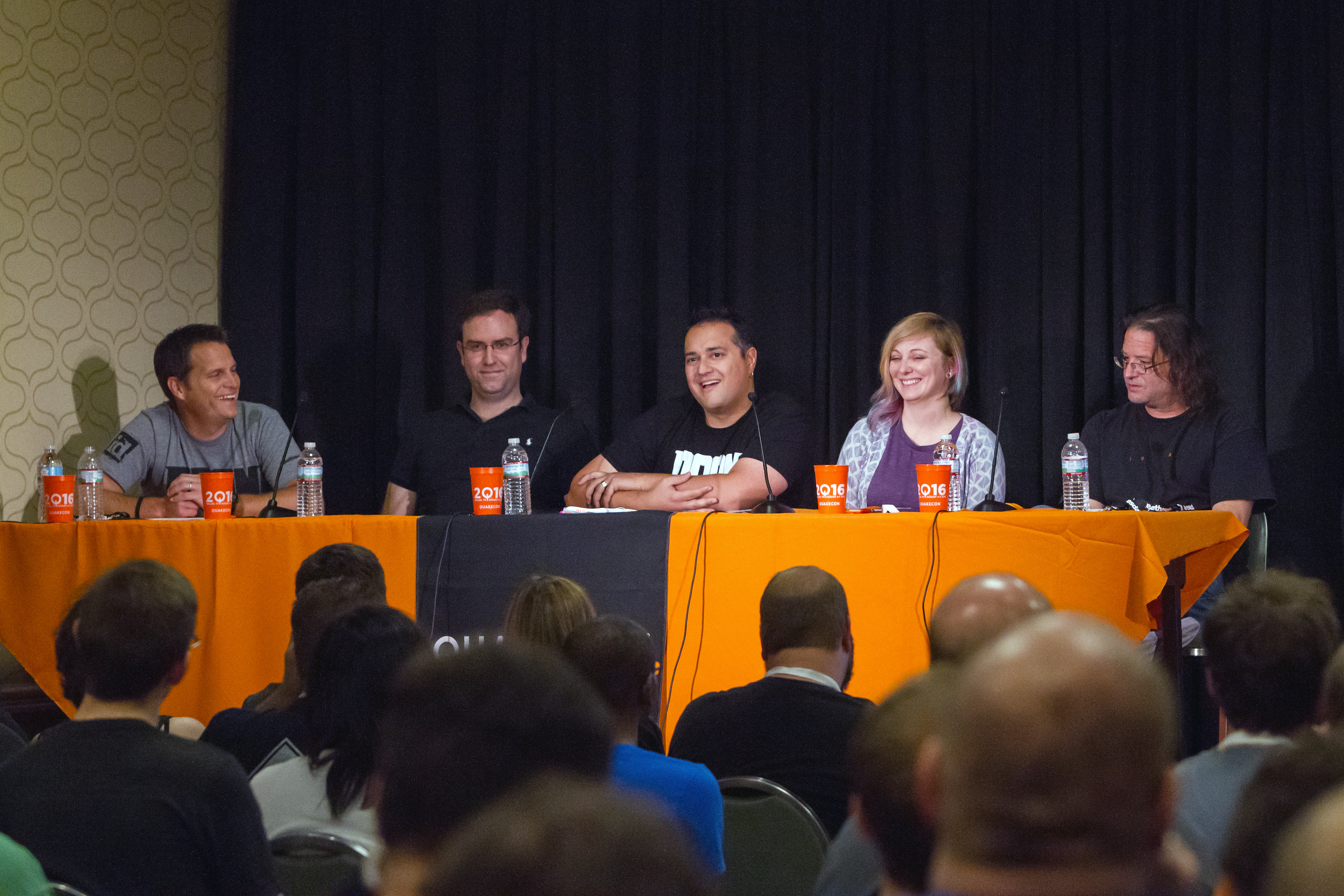
Various developers at QuakeCon 2016. From left to right: Marty Stratton, Tiago Sousa, Billy Khan, Shale Williams, and Robert Duffy.

On June 10, 2014, Bethesda presented a teaser trailer at E3 2014, followed by another at id's yearly convention, QuakeCon, on July 17, 2014, that revealed Doom 4 had been renamed to Doom and would be a series reboot. id selected Stratton to be game director and hired Hugo Martin as creative director in August 2013. Tiago Sousa, head R&D graphics engineer at Crytek, led development of the id Tech 6 engine for Doom. Stratton, Martin, and id used the original Doom games as their template for Doom's artwork and gameplay, and abandoned the slower pace and survival horror themes of Doom 3. Stratton highlighted id's desire to "[be] faithful to the legacy of [the original] Doom" and the replication of its tone. Willits explained that Doom was "built on the emotional core of the original game".

Development of Doom focused primarily on refining its combat, dubbed "push forward combat". The Glory Kill mechanic, which began as a "sync melee" system to be used in Doom 4, (Note: The designs of the Hell Knight and Summoner demons, and Super Shotgun and Chainsaw weapons, were also retained from Doom 4.) was developed early and became crucial to the design of Doom's combat. To incentivize player aggression, id rewarded use of the Glory Kill mechanic and chainsaw by replenishing resources and built the game's levels to encourage movement during combat. Enemies were also designed to visually resemble those of the original Doom games and encourage the player to be mobile.

Id placed less emphasis on Doom's story, which was written by Adam Gascoine. Speaking to Noclip, Martin said that the story was one of the last elements of the game to be implemented, and that he and Gascoine aimed for a lighter, self-aware narrative; the game begins with a quotation of the 1996 Doom comic book. In his direction for Doom's story, Martin was inspired by action movies such as RoboCop (1987), Evil Dead 2 (1987), and The Last Boy Scout (1991), and paintings by American artist Frank Frazetta.

Doom's multiplayer was co-developed with Certain Affinity, though id parted ways with them after launch to work on the Windows-version multiplayer and introduce new features such as private matches, custom game settings, and an enhanced cheat detection system. BattleCry Studios assisted id with post-release multiplayer updates. SnapMap was developed with Escalation Studios. Patches for Doom after its release introduced a new photo mode, a new game option for holding weapons in the center of the screen as in the original games, and support for the Vulkan API. The Vulkan patch was expected to enable playable frame rates on older hardware. Subsequent benchmarks show up to a 66% improvement in the frame rates on AMD graphics cards, with minor changes in the performance of Nvidia cards.

=== Soundtrack ===
Doom's soundtrack was composed by Australian musician and composer Mick Gordon, with contributions by American electronic musician and sound designer Richard Devine. Gordon met with id at their Dallas headquarters in mid-2014 to discuss composing music for Doom. At their meeting, id instructed Gordon not to use guitars or write a metal score, despite the original Doom having an ambient, thrash metal soundtrack by Bobby Prince, as id felt that the genre had grown "corny". Gordon was encouraged to use synthesizers, and used them to create the sound Argent energy might make. He designed several chains of effects units through which he passed sub-bass sine waves, layered with white noise to make them audible on widely available speaker equipment. According to Gordon, after "six to nine months [of] doing just synthesizers", he convinced id to allow the use of guitars and began experimenting with augmenting their sound. For the main riff of the main menu track, Gordon combined a nine-string guitar with a sample of the chainsaw from the original Doom.

Gordon devised different soundscapes for Mars and for Hell, saying in an interview with Revolver magazine, "As the [Mars] environments were created by humans ... the music needed to sound like humans created it, too. ... That lead to Hell being more atonal, dissonant and weird." Some tracks, such as "At Doom's Gate", contain homages to Prince's work for the original Doom. Gordon also included Easter eggs in the soundtrack; shortly after the game's release in May 2016, players discovered pentagrams and the number "666" hidden in the track "Cyberdemon" via spectrogram. Speaking to the Game Development Conference about composing Doom's soundtrack in 2017, Gordon revealed the presence of a reversed message, "Jesus loves you", in an unidentified track. On February 7, 2019, Gordon confirmed the discovery of the final Easter egg on Twitter.

== Release and marketing ==
Doom was released worldwide for PlayStation 4, Windows, and Xbox One on May 13, 2016, except in Japan, where it was released on May 19, 2016, and Stadia on August 19, 2020. It was the first game in the franchise to be released without censorship in Germany. A Nintendo Switch port developed by Panic Button was released on November 10, 2017, without SnapMap because of storage constraints of the Game Card. Review copies of the game were held back until release day, which prompted comment from several gaming outlets. Bethesda partnered with Arrow Schmidt Peterson Motorsports for a special promotion in which Mikhail Aleshin drove a Doom-styled car at the Indianapolis 500 racing competition. The vehicle crashed during the 2016 Indianapolis 500 and was eliminated from the race.

=== Spin-offs ===
On June 12, 2016, at E3 2016, Bethesda announced a virtual reality (VR) adaptation of Doom with a demo. The critical reception of the VR adaptation was mixed. A virtual pinball adaptation of Doom was released on December 6, 2016, as part of the Bethesda Pinball collection for Zen Pinball 2, Pinball FX 2, and Pinball FX 3, as well as a separate free-to-play app for iOS and Android mobile devices. A VR spinoff of Doom, Doom VFR, was announced at E3 2017 and was released for the PlayStation VR and HTC Vive headsets on December 1, 2017. The game was set after the events of Doom and was generally well received by critics.

=== Trailers and cover art ===
The alternate cover that was picked via a poll on Twitter

Initial reception of the QuakeCon 2014 trailer accumulated considerable acclaim among fans. At E3 2015, on June 14, Bethesda showed gameplay from the singleplayer campaign and multiplayer, which was simultaneously applauded and criticized for its graphic violence. Hines responded by saying, "if you're not into violent, bloody games... Doom's probably not a game for you." A live-action trailer directed by American filmmaker Joe Kosinski was released on March 31, 2016.

On February 4, 2016, Bethesda revealed Doom's official box art, which was immediately criticized as "painfully boring and dull." From March 3, to March 7, 2016, Bethesda held a poll on Twitter to decide an alternate cover that would be printed on the obverse of the official box art. The winner, with 68% of the votes cast, was a cover inspired by the original Doom's, showing the Doom Slayer battling demons in Hell.

=== Multiplayer alpha and beta tests ===
Bethesda announced on February 19, 2014, that a beta version of Doom, then still called Doom 4, would be made available to those who pre-ordered Wolfenstein: The New Order (2014), a reboot of Wolfenstein developed by MachineGames and published by Bethesda. These players were also given exclusive access to an alpha test of Doom's multiplayer, which ran from October 23 to 25, 2015. A second alpha test of the multiplayer was held from December 3 to 6, 2015. A datamine of the content in the alphas revealed aspects of the singleplayer campaign such as the existence of the Spider Mastermind.

A closed beta test of the multiplayer began on March 31, 2016, and ended on April 3, and was followed by an open beta that ran from April 15 to April 18, 2016. PC Games criticized the weapons and weapon loadouts following the closed beta but praised the mobility. Nathan Lawrence of IGN and Adam Smith of Rock, Paper, Shotgun also criticized the weapon loadouts and unfavorably compared the open beta to other shooters such as Halo, Quake 3, Unreal Tournament, and Call of Duty. The beta was also negatively received by players on Steam.

=== Downloadable content ===
Doom supported downloadable content (DLC) packs, three of which had to be purchased, and added three new maps and a demon. These multiplayer DLCs were Unto the Evil, released on August 4, 2016; Hell Followed, released on October 27, 2016; and Bloodfall, released December 14, 2016. On July 19, 2017, Bethesda made the three paid DLCs free to all players.

== Reception ==
Reception

Aggregate score
Aggregator	Score
Metacritic	NS: 79/100; PC: 85/100; PS4: 85/100; XONE: 87/100

Review scores
Publication	Score
Destructoid	9/10
Electronic Gaming Monthly	8.5/10
Game Informer	8.75/10
GameRevolution	4.5/5
GameSpot	8/10
GamesRadar+	5/5
Giant Bomb	5/5
IGN	7.1/10
PC Gamer (US)	88/100
Polygon	8.5/10
VideoGamer.com	8/10
Digital Spy	4/5
The Guardian	4/5
The Telegraph	5/5

Edit on Wikidata

Upon release, Doom was positively received, with scores of 85/100 for PC and PlayStation 4, 87/100 for the Xbox One, and 79/100 on Nintendo Switch on Metacritic. The final PC version of the game received very positive reviews from users on Steam. The Nintendo Switch port was also praised in a review by Nintendo Life.

The game's single-player elements received critical acclaim and were favorably compared to contemporary shooter games. Mike Henriquez of GameRevolution described the visual and artistic design as "top-notch". Sam White in The Daily Telegraph lauded Doom for its performance on all platforms, weapon design, and score. Peter Brown of GameSpot praised single-player because he thought that the reboot captured the spirits of the older games, while refining them with modern elements. Brown also drew attention toward the soundtrack, calling it "impactful". Jordan Pearson of Vice also singled out the score for praise. James Davenport, writing for PC Gamer in December 2016, called Doom's soundtrack "one of the best" of 2016.

Polygon's Arthur Gies remarked positively upon the exploration for collectables and secrets, and their relevance to the new upgrade feature, but he was critical of instances where the game would lock away sections of a level without warning. Zack Furniss of Destructoid, originally skeptical about the "Glory Kill" mechanic, ultimately considered it to fit well in the flow of gameplay. Giant Bomb's Brad Shoemaker felt that the mechanic was "an essential part of the give-and-take of Doom's super fast combat". Conversely, Kyle Orland of Ars Technica felt that the mechanic briefly taking control away from the player can easily disorient players or misposition them.

SnapMap was also positively received, with critics praising its simplicity and ease-of-use, but also expressing disappointment at only being able to use in-game assets. Matt Bertz of Game Informer commented upon the accessibility but criticized the lack of diverse settings and possible limitations when compared to a traditional community-based mod.

The multiplayer mode received mixed reception from critics. IGN's Joab Gilroy described Doom as "a tale of two very different shooters", stating that multiplayer did not live up to the standard set by the single-player components and would not satisfy players. Matt Buchholtz of Electronic Gaming Monthly criticized what he felt was the network's poor handling of latency. Edwin Evans-Thirlwell of Eurogamer singled out the "Warpath" multiplayer mode as the most interesting of the match type, describing it as "memorable", and regarded the other multiplayer modes as underdeveloped and underwhelming. Julian Benson from Kotaku wrote that Doom's multiplayer was very similar to other contemporary games. David Houghton of GamesRadar+ called the multiplayer "endlessly playable, smart, brutal fun." Jon Denton, writing for Eurogamer, also praised the multiplayer.

=== Sales ===
Doom was the second best-selling retail game in its week of release in the US and UK behind Uncharted 4: A Thief's End, By late June 2016, the game rose to number one in the UK charts, overtaking Uncharted 4 and the later-released Overwatch, and remained number one for a second week. Sales for Doom on PC reached 500,000 copies in May 2016, 1,000,000 copies in August 2016, and 2,000,000 copies by July 2017. When Doom released for the Switch, it was the fourth-best selling title of its debut week in the United Kingdom.

=== Accolades ===
Doom was named one of the best games of 2016 by critics and media outlets such as Giant Bomb, GameSpot, GamesRadar, The Escapist, The A.V. Club, Rock Paper Shotgun, James Stephanie Sterling, VG247, Daily Mirror, and Shacknews. Doom's soundtrack won the Best Music / Sound Design award at The Game Awards 2016; Gordon, joined by Periphery drummer Matt Halpern and Quake II composer Sascha Dikiciyan, performed a short medley of the tracks "Rip and Tear", "BFG Division", and Quake II's "Descent Into Cerberon" at the awards show. It was also nominated for the Audio Achievement and Best Music categories of the 13th British Academy Games Awards.

Year	Award	Category	Result	Ref.
2015	Game Critics Awards 2015	Best Action Game	Nominated	
2015	Game Critics Awards 2015	Best PC Game	Nominated	
2016	Golden Joystick Award 2016	Game of the Year	Nominated	
2016	Golden Joystick Award 2016	Best Visual Design	Nominated	
2016	Golden Joystick Award 2016	Best Audio	Nominated	
2016	Golden Joystick Award 2016	PC Game of the Year	Nominated	
2016	The Game Awards 2016	Game of the Year	Nominated	
2016	The Game Awards 2016	Best Game Direction	Nominated	
2016	The Game Awards 2016	Best Music/Sound Design	Won	
2016	The Game Awards 2016	Best Action Game	Won	
2016	Canadian Videogame Awards 2016	Fans' Choice: Best International Game	Nominated	
2017	20th Annual D.I.C.E. Awards	Action Game of the Year	Nominated	
2017	20th Annual D.I.C.E. Awards	Outstanding Achievement in Original Music Composition	Won	
2017	17th Game Developers Choice Awards	Best Audio	Nominated	
2017	17th Game Developers Choice Awards	Best Design	Nominated	
2017	17th Game Developers Choice Awards	Best Technology	Nominated	
2017	2017 SXSW Gaming Awards	Video Game of the Year	Nominated	
2017	2017 SXSW Gaming Awards	Excellence in Gameplay	Won	
2017	2017 SXSW Gaming Awards	Excellence in Animation	Nominated	
2017	2017 SXSW Gaming Awards	Excellence in Visual Achievement	Nominated	
2017	2017 SXSW Gaming Awards	Excellence in Musical Score	Won	
2017	13th British Academy Games Awards	Audio Achievement	Nominated	
2017	13th British Academy Games Awards	Music	Nominated	
2017	National Academy of Video Game Trade Reviewers	Art Direction, Contemporary	Won	
2017	National Academy of Video Game Trade Reviewers	Control Design, 3D	Won	
2017	National Academy of Video Game Trade Reviewers	Control Precision	Won	
2017	National Academy of Video Game Trade Reviewers	Game Design, Franchise	Won	
2017	National Academy of Video Game Trade Reviewers	Game, Classic Revival	Won	
2017	National Academy of Video Game Trade Reviewers	Game, Franchise Action	Won	

== Continuation ==
=== Doom Eternal ===
A sequel to Doom, Doom Eternal, was released on March 20, 2020, and is set years after, showcasing the Slayer's combat against demonic forces on Earth. The development of Doom influenced Doom Eternal's in several ways. Post-release analysis by id and the Doom playerbase showed a reliance on the Super Shotgun to the exclusion of all other weapons by a large segment of the game's players. To encourage players to use other weapons, id reduced the amount of ammo the player could carry in Doom Eternal and reworked the other weapons, weapon mods, and enemies in the game, and added weaknesses to specific weapons to specific enemies. id also abandoned team deathmatch for Doom Eternal's multiplayer and instead created a gamemode called Battlemode, in which AI and player-controlled demons battle a player-controlled Doom Slayer. SnapMap was not retained for Doom Eternal.

=== Doom: The Dark Ages ===
A prequel to Doom, Doom: The Dark Ages, was released on May 15, 2025, showcasing the slayer fighting against a demonic invasion on the planet Argent D'Nur.
