= List of freeware first-person shooters =

This is a list of some of the most popular freeware and free and open-source software first-person shooter games.

| Title | Developer | Release date | Last update | Operating system | Engine | License | Notes |
|---|---|---|---|---|---|---|---|
| Action Quake 2 | The Action Team | 1998 | 2003 | Linux, Windows | id Tech 2 | Freeware | Team and Deathmatch based very fast FPS |
| AssaultCube | Rabid Viper Productions | 2006 | 2022-04-01 (1.3.0.2) | Linux, Mac OS, Windows, Android | Cube Engine | zlib License (code), Individual licenses (media) | Realistic environments, fast arcade game play, many game modes. Single/Multiplayer. |
| AssaultCube Reloaded (ACR) | AssaultCube Reloaded Task Force | 2010 | 2021 | Linux, Mac OS (requires manual compilation), Windows | Cube Engine | zlib License (code), Individual licenses (media) | Improves AssaultCube. Single/Multiplayer. |
| Black Shades | Wolfire games | 2001 | | Linux, OS X, Windows, Mac OS, iOS | Wolfire Games | Freeware | Free First-person shooter |
| BZFlag | Chris Schoeneman, Tim Riker | 1993 | 2025-03-17 (2.4.30) | Linux, BSD, OS X, Windows, other UNIX | | GNU LGPL | Tank combat |
| Chub Gam 3D: Director's Cut | ChubGamSoft | 1998 | | MS-DOS | Pie in the Sky | Freeware | Surreal horror single player game |
| CodeRED: Alien Arena | COR Entertainment, LLC | 2004-11 | 2011-12-29 (7.53) | Linux, BSD, OS X, Windows | CRX Engine | GNU GPL (code), Proprietary license (media) | Science fiction, with single or multiplayer modes. |
| Cube | Wouter van Oortmerssen | 2001 | 2005-08-29 | Linux, BSD, Mac OS, Windows | Cube Engine | zlib License (code), Individual licenses (media) | Quake style multiplayer deathmatch. Single/Multiplayer. |
| Cube 2: Sauerbraten | Wouter van Oortmerssen | 2004 | 2020-11-30 | Linux, BSD, OS X, Windows | Cube 2 Engine | zlib License (code), Individual licenses (media) | Quake style deathmatch, includes built in level editor. Single/Multiplayer. |
| The Dark Mod | Team Dark Mod | 2009 | 2015-02-08 (2.03) | Windows, Linux, OS X | id Tech 4 engine | CC-BY-NC-SA | First person stealth game in the style of the Thief series games (1 and 2) using a modified Id Tech 4 engine |
| Fallen Empire: Legions | GarageGames, InstantAction | 2009-06-30 | 2013-06-27 | Windows | Torque Game Engine | Proprietary license | First-Person Shooter with Jetpacks, Multiplayer, CTF, Deathmatch |
| Freedoom | Freedoom project | | 2024-01-29 (0.13.0) | Linux, OS X, Windows, Android, Mac OS, MS-DOS, others | Doom engine | GNU GPL (code), BSD (media) | A Doom WAD file intended to be used instead of the copyrighted file from the original Doom and Doom II. |
| The Glorious Mission | Giant Interactive Group | 2013-06-20 | | Windows | | Proprietary license | Online multiplayer. Developed with the People's Liberation Army of China for use as a recruitment and training tool. |
| Gore: Special Edition | 4D Rulers | 2008-07-04 | | Windows | AMP engine | Proprietary license | |
| Hidden & Dangerous | Illusion Softworks, Take-Two Interactive | 1999-07-29 | 2001-11 | Windows | Insanity Engine | Proprietary license | |
| .kkrieger | .theprodukkt | 2004 | | Windows | | Proprietary license | Won first place in the 96k game competition at Breakpoint in April 2004. |
| Kuma\War | Kuma Reality Games | 2004 | 2006-07 | Windows | Source engine | Proprietary license | Tactical episodic shooter. Single/Multiplayer. |
| Marathon | Bungie | 1994-12-21 | 2007 | Mac OS (original), ported to Linux, OS X and Windows via AlephOne | Aleph One | GNU GPL (code) | Released as freeware and source code. |
| Nexuiz | Alientrap | 2005-05-31 | 2009-10-01 (2.5.2) | Linux, OS X (10.4 or later), Windows | DarkPlaces Quake engine | GNU GPL | Unreal Tournament style deathmatch. Single/Multiplayer. |
| OpenArena | OpenArena team | 2005-08-19 | 2012-02-20 (0.8.8) | Linux, OS X, Windows | ioquake3 id Tech 3 | GNU GPL | Free software content remake of Quake III Arena. Single/Multiplayer |
| OpenSpades | YVT | | 2019-01-04 (0.1.3) | Linux, OS X, Windows | | GNU GPL | Based on Ace of Spades 0.75 |
| Point Blank | Zepetto, NCSOFT | 2008-03 | | Windows | N/A | Proprietary license | Free FPS created by Zepetto in 2009. Close Beta version. |
| Red Eclipse | Quinton Reeves, Lee Salzman | 2011-03-15 | 2024-05-28 (2.0.9-9) | Linux, BSD, OS X, Windows | Cube 2 Engine / Tesseract | zlib License | New take on the first person arena shooter, featuring parkour, impulse boosts, and more. |
| S.T.A.L.K.E.R. build 1935 | GSC Game World | 2009-02 | | Windows | xrCore build 1935 | Proprietary license | 2004 Alpha build of S.T.A.L.K.E.R.: Shadow of Chernobyl. Contains content and features cut from the final release. Has a number of bugs but contains a full, playable single player campaign. |
| Savage: The Battle for Newerth | S2 Games | 2003-09-09 | | Linux, OS X (commercial), Windows | Silverback Engine | Proprietary license | Hybrid FPS/RTS with both ranged and melee combat |
| Savage 2: A Tortured Soul | S2 Games | 2008-01-16 | | Linux, OS X, Windows (commercial) | K2 Engine | Proprietary license | The sequel to the award-winning game, Savage: The Battle for Newerth. |
| Smokin' Guns | Smokin' Guns Productions and Iron Claw Interactive | 2009-01-01 | 2012-06-08 | Linux, BSD, OS X, Windows, others | ioquake3 id Tech 3 | GNU GPL (code/some media) Proprietary license (some media) | Western Quake-like FPS. Single (with bots)/Multiplayer. |
| Starsiege: Tribes | Dynamix, Sierra Entertainment | 2004 (free release) | | Windows | Darkstar engine | Proprietary license | Futuristic team based combat, released for free to promote Tribes: Vengeance. Multiplayer only. |
| The DinoHunters | Kuma Games | 2006-04-24 | | Windows | Source engine | Proprietary license | Also a machinima series. Single/Multiplayer. |
| Tremulous | Dark Legion Development | 2006-03-31 | 2009-12-04 (preview release) | Linux, OS X (unofficial), Windows | ioquake3 id Tech 3 | GNU GPL | Aliens vs Humans multiplayer team combat with some RTS elements. |
| Tribes 2 | Dynamix, Sierra Entertainment | 2004 (free release) | | Windows | Torque Game Engine | Proprietary License | Futuristic team based combat, released for free to promote Tribes: Vengeance. Single/Multiplayer. |
| UberStrike | Cmune Ltd. | 2008 | 2015-06-17 | OS X, Windows | Unity | Proprietary license | Free-to-play "social shooter" on Facebook, MySpace and Apple's Dashboard Widgets. |
| Unreal Tournament | Epic Games | Cancelled | 2015-03-09 | Linux, OS X, Windows | Unreal Engine 4 | Proprietary license | Crowdsourced and free first-person shooter. |
| Unvanquished | Unvanquished Development | 2012-02-29 | 2021-06-21 (Alpha 0.52.1) | Linux, OS X, Windows | modified ioquake3 | CC BY-SA 2.5/GPL | Fork of Tremulous with new assets |
| Urban Terror | Silicon Ice Development / Frozen Sand | 2000-08-05 (Beta 1.0) | 2018-06-21 (4.3.4) | Linux, OS X, Windows | ioquake3 id Tech 3 | GNU GPL (ioquake3 engine), Proprietary license (mod code, media) | Fast-paced, Hollywood tactical shooter. Originally a Quake 3 mod, now a standalone game. |
| Warmonger: Operation Downtown Destruction | NetDevil | 2007-11-28 | 2009-08-27 | Windows | Unreal Engine 3 | GNU GPL (code), Proprietary license (media) | High-end Free-to-play first person shooter with destructible environments.. |
| Warsow | Warsow team | 2005-06-08 | 2016-04-14 (2.1) | Linux, OS X, Windows | Qfusion id Tech 2 | GNU GPL (code), Proprietary license (media) | Quake style deathmatch focussed on high-paced action and trickjumps. |
| Wolfenstein: Enemy Territory | Activision, id Software, Splash Damage | 2003-05-29 | 2015-08-21 (ET:Legacy 2.74) | Linux, OS X, Windows | id Tech 3, ET:Legacy | GNU GPL (code), Proprietary license (media) | Intended expansion pack turned freeware. WW2 multiplayer team combat |
| World of Padman | Padworld Entertainment | 2007-04-01 | 2011-07-16 (1.5.4 beta Windows/Linux), 2011-01-24 (1.5.1 OS X) | Linux, OS X, Windows | ioquake3 id Tech 3 | GNU GPL (code), Proprietary license (media) | A free Quake 3 like comical FPS game |
| Xonotic | Team Xonotic | 2010-12-23 | 2023-06-20 (0.8.6) | Linux, OS X, Windows | DarkPlaces Quake engine | GNU GPL | Fork and direct successor of the Nexuiz Project. |
| Team Fortress 2 | Valve | 2007-10-7 | 2019-3-28 | Windows, Mac OS, Linux. | Source | Proprietary license | Also available on Xbox 360 and PlayStation 3, formerly pay to play, sequel to Team Fortress Classic. |

== Freeware clients ==
Some free-to-play online first-person shooters use a client–server model, in which only the client is available for free. They may be associated with business models such as optional microtransactions or in-game advertising. Some of these may be MMOFPS, MMOTPS or MMORPG games.

| Title | Developer, Publisher | Release date | Operating system | Engine | License | Notes |
|---|---|---|---|---|---|---|
| Blacklight: Retribution | Zombie Studios | 2012-04-03 | Windows | Unreal Engine 3 | Proprietary license | Online multiplayer, futuristic setting. |
| Crossfire | Z8Games | 2006 | Windows | Lithtech Jupiter | Freeware | Modern team-based shooter. Many game modes. |
| Mission Against Terror | Kingsoft Dalian JingCai Studio, Wicked Interactive / Suba Games | 2012 | Windows | | Proprietary license | Free-to-play online fps, developed by KingSoft, published by Wicked Interactive / Suba Games. |
| Fallen Earth | ? | ? | ? | ? | ? | Online multiplayer |
| Heroes and Generals | ? | ? | ? | ? | ? | Online multiplayer |
| War Rock | ? | ? | ? | ? | ? | Online multiplayer, features controllable vehicles |
| Combat Arms | Nexon | 2008-07-11 | Windows | Lithtech | Proprietary license | Online multiplayer, modern setting; microtransaction business model. |
| CrimeCraft | Vogster Entertainment | 2009-08 | Windows | Unreal Engine 3 | Proprietary license | Massively multiplayer online with 3rd and 1st-person perspectives; microtransaction business model. |
| PlanetSide 2 | Daybreak Game Company | 2012-11-20 | Windows | ForgeLight | Proprietary license | Massive battles with 2000 players per continent at a time. 3 factions fighting over 4 continents. Player customization, microtransaction business model. |
| Sudden Attack | Nexon | 2005-4-11 | Windows | Lithtech | Proprietary license | Online multiplayer |
| Tribes: Ascend | Hi-Rez Studios | 2011-12 | Windows | Unreal Engine 3 (modified) | Proprietary license | Online multiplayer; microtransaction business model. |
| Overwatch 2 | Blizzard Entertainment | 2022-04-10 | Windows, PS4/5, Xbox One/Series, Nintendo Switch | Custom | Proprietary license | Changed to free-to-play after Overwatch closed |

== Game engines ==
| Engine | Developer, Publisher | Release date | Linux | OS X | Windows | other | License | Notes |
|---|---|---|---|---|---|---|---|---|
| Aleph One | Bungie (originally) | 2000-01-17 | Yes | Yes | Yes | Mac OS, BSDs | GPL-3.0-or-later | Aleph One is an open-source project based on the Marathon 2: Durandal code, which was released to the public by Bungie. |
| Build engine | Ken Silverman/3D Realms | 2000-06-20 | Yes | Yes | Yes | Yes | Custom licence, GNU General Public License | First released by Silverman; 3D Realms later did GPL releases of Duke Nukem 3D and Shadow Warrior |
| Cube Engine | Wouter van Oortmerssen | 2001 | Yes | Yes | Yes | Android | zlib License (code), Individual licenses (media) | FPS with sandbox style level-editor |
| Cube 2 Engine | Wouter van Oortmerssen | 2004 | Yes | Yes | Yes | No | zlib License (code), Individual licenses (media) | FPS with sandbox style level-editor |
| Dim3 | Brian Barnes | | No | Yes | Yes | No | MIT License | Development set |
| Wolfenstein 3D engine | id Software | 1995 | Yes | Yes | Yes | No | GPL-2.0-or-later | Also available in Blake Stone: Planet Strike source release; further developed in Rise of the Triad source release |
| Doom engine | id Software | 1999-10-03 | Yes | Yes | Yes | No | GPL-2.0-or-later | Originally used for Doom, Doom II, Heretic and Hexen. |
| Quake engine | id Software | 1999-12-21 | Yes | Yes | Yes | No | GPL-2.0-or-later | Quake, Hexen II, DarkPlaces is an open source derivative. |
| id Tech 2 | id Software | 2001-12-22 | Yes | Yes | Yes | No | GPL-2.0-or-later | Quake 2, CRX and Qfusion are open-source derivatives |
| id Tech 3 | id Software | 2005-08-19 | Yes | Yes | Yes | Yes | GPL-2.0-or-later | Quake 3, ioquake3 is an open-source derivative |
| id Tech 3 | id Software | 2010-08-12 | Yes | Yes | Yes | Yes | GPL-3.0-or-later | Return to Castle Wolfenstein, iortcw is an open-source derivative |
| id Tech 4 | id Software | 2011-11-22 | Yes | Yes | Yes | Yes | GPL-3.0-or-later | Doom 3 |
| id Tech 4 | id Software | 2012-11-26 | Yes | Yes | Yes | Yes | GPL-3.0-or-later | Doom 3: BFG Edition |
| Torque Game Engine | GarageGames | 2012-09-20 | Yes | Yes | Yes | No | MIT License | |
| Unity | Unity Technologies | 2009 | Yes | Yes | Yes | No | Purchasable license for commercial use, iPhone license, Free indie license | Development set |
| Unreal Engine | Epic Games | 1998 | Yes | Yes | Yes | PlayStation 4, Xbox One, iOS, Android | Proprietary | Free to download and use |

== See also ==
- List of open-source video games
