= Guangrong =

Guangrong may refer to:

- Guangrong Village (广荣村), Liushan, Guangxi, China
- Guangrong Village (广荣村), Longyan Township, Huanjiang Maonan Autonomous County, Guangxi, China
- Guangrong Village (光荣村), Jindong, Maoming, Xinyi, Guangdong Province, China
- Guangrong Village (光荣村), Shitan, Xiangtan, Hunan Province, China
- Guangrong Village (光榮里), Magong, Penghu County, Taiwan
- Qin Guangrong (born 1950), a former Chinese politician
- Ye Guangrong, a character in Chinese film Trouble Makers (2006 film)
- Alan Tang (鄧光榮; Pinyin: Dèng Guāngróng; 1946–2011), a Hong Kong film actor, producer and director

== See also ==
- Glorious Mission (Chinese: 光荣使命; pinyin: Guāngróng shǐmìng), a Chinese first-person shooter computer game
- Glory Pier (Chinese: 光榮碼頭; pinyin: Guāngróng Mǎtóu), a pier in Lingya District, Kaohsiung, Taiwan
