= List of video games derived from mods =

This is a list of standalone video games that have been ported from a modification of another video game, and/or that are entirely based on a modification of another video game. A game is considered standalone when it does not require the purchase or installation of any other game (including separate engine software such as the Source SDK) in order to run.

== List ==
Game	Original dependency	Mod release	Standalone	Notes
0 A.D.	Age of Empires II	2000	2010 April 2	The standalone version is under development by Wildfire Games and using the Pyrogenesis engine.
Alien Swarm	Unreal Tournament 2004	2004 May 28	2010 July 19	The standalone version was developed by Valve and ported to the Source engine.
Angels Fall First: Planetstorm	Unreal Tournament 3	2008 October 20	2015 October 1	
Antichamber	Unreal Tournament 3	2009	2013 January 31	The mod was originally known as Hazard: The Journey of Life.
Auto Chess	Dota 2	2019 January 4	2019 May 30	The standalone remake of the Dota Auto Chess mod from within Dota 2, developed by Drodo Studio.
The Ball	Unreal Tournament 3	2008	2010 October 26	
Bid For Power	Quake III Arena	2004	2004	Bid For Power is a total conversion for Quake III, inspired by Dragon Ball. Players control Ki-powered superheroes in a mostly aerial battle in third-person perspective, in contrast with the FPS genre of the original game. The game is notable for its freedom and control of its characters and an original art style.
Black Mesa	Half-Life 2	2012 September 14	2020 March 6	The game is a remake of Valve's game Half-Life.
Chex Quest	Doom		1996	A total conversion of The Ultimate Doom, Chex Quest was a Chex cereal promotion aimed at children aged 6–9 and up. It was the first video game ever to be included in cereal boxes as a prize.
Chivalry: Medieval Warfare	Half-Life 2	2007 December 1	2012 October 16	The original mod was called Age of Chivalry. The standalone version did not use the Source Engine like Half-Life 2. Instead, it was developed for Unreal Engine 3.
Counter-Strike	Half-Life	1999 June 19	2000 November 8	The game received multiple sequels and a Source Engine remake named Counter-Strike: Source.
Cry of Fear	Half-Life	2012 February 22	2013 April 25	
D-Day: Normandy	Quake II	2000	2002	
The Dark Mod	Doom III	2009 October 17	2013 April 14	Several demo missions were released before the mod was made available, the first of which went up for download on 18 January 2008, nearly two years before the mod was actually released.
Day of Defeat	Half-Life	2001	2003 May 1	The game received a Source Engine remake named Day of Defeat: Source.
Day of Infamy	Insurgency	2016 January 16	2017 March 23	A WWII remake of Insurgency.
DayZ	ARMA 2	2013 February 21	2013 December 16	The standalone version was released as a full version on 13 December 2018.
Dear Esther	Half-Life 2	2008	2012 February 14	
Dino D-Day	Half-Life 2	2009 November 12	2011 April 8	
Dota 2	Warcraft III: Reign of Chaos	2003	2013 July 9	The rights to the original mod (Defense of the Ancients) were acquired by Valve, and a derived standalone game was developed in the Source Engine and later ported to Source 2.
Element TD	Warcraft III: Reign of Chaos	2006 August 20	2016 June 15 (Android); 2016 July 29 (iOS)	After the mod was ported to StarCraft 2 and Dota 2, it was made into a paid standalone app using the Unity Engine for Android and iOS mobile devices in June 2016. A second similar app was released on both platforms during mid-October, available as free to download but with some content locked behind a paywall. The monetized version of Element TD was later ported to Microsoft Windows in January 2017.
Element TD 2	Warcraft III: Reign of Chaos	2006 August 20	2020 February 28 (early access); 2021 April 2 (full release)	The sequel was released into early access on Steam in late February 2020, subsequently rebuilding Element TD once again in the Unity Engine but now designed for Microsoft Windows. A full release occurred the next year in early April.
Falcon BMS	Falcon 4.0	2003	2012, version 4.32	The mod is under development by Benchmark Sims.
Fistful of Frags	Half-Life 2	2007 December 21	2014 May 9	
The Forgotten City	The Elder Scrolls V: Skyrim	2015 October 2	2021 July 28	The original mod won a Writers Guild of America award for its script.
Forgotten Hope 2	Battlefield 2	2006	2007	Forgotten Hope 2 is a World War II modification based on the original Forgotten Hope, a modification for Battlefield 1942.
Garry's Mod	Half-Life 2	2004 December 24	2006 November 29	The standalone release originally required that the player own any game made by Valve that runs on the Source engine; this requirement was later dropped as assets for Half-Life 2 are now included with the game. In 2025, an update added widely used assets from Counter-Strike:Source and episodic content from Half-Life 2.
Gunman Chronicles	Half-Life		2000 November 20	The mod was originally under development for the Quake engine, but switched twice: first to the Quake II engine and finally to GoldSrc, the engine used by Half-Life, which it remained using for its standalone release.
Hacx: Twitch 'n Kill	Doom II	1997 September	2010 October 9	
Half-Life: Threewave	Quake	1996	unreleased	The creator of the original Threewave CTF mod Dave "Zoid" Kirsch was hired by Valve to port it to the GoldSrc engine. However, the game was never released, and its unfinished code was found years later in a leak and polished by community members to allow for public play.
The Haunted: Hell's Reach	Unreal Tournament 3	2010	2011 October 25	
Heroes of the Storm	StarCraft II	2010	2015 June 2	The game originated as a custom map called "Blizzard DOTA", as a part of the arcade feature for StarCraft II: Wings of Liberty.
Insurgency: Modern Infantry Combat	Half-Life 2	2007	2014 January 22	
Killing Floor	Unreal Tournament 2004	2005 July 2	2009 May 14	Killing Floor was the first video game to popularize the cooperative wave-based survival game mode.
Klaus Veen's Treason	Counter-Strike: Condition Zero	2004 March 23	2023 January 31	Klaus Veen's Treason is a free social deduction FPS game heavily derivative of Trouble in Terrorist Town and Murder, popularized by Garry's Mod. Treason had its beginnings as a map collection within the Counter-Strike: Condition Zero TTT mod before it became a standalone Source project.
Legion TD 2	Warcraft III: Reign of Chaos		2017 November 20 (Early Access); 2021 (planned release)	Legion TD 2 is being developed by the same developers of the original Warcraft III map (Legion TD).
Natural Selection 2	Half-Life	2002 October 31	2012 October 31	Natural Selection 2 is a sequel to the original mod named Natural Selection.
Nexuiz	Quake	2001	2005 May 31	The game received a sequel with the same name by IllFonic, and the project was forked by its community and renamed Xonotic.
No More Room in Hell	Half-Life 2	2011 October 31	2013 October 31	
Nuclear Dawn	Half-Life 2		2011 September 26	
Path of the Midnight Sun	Fire Emblem: The Sacred Stones	2014 May 23	2023 January 10	The original mod was called Fire Emblem: Midnight Sun.
PUBG: Battlegrounds	Arma 3	2015 April 9	2017 December 20	
Project Reality: BF2	Battlefield 2	2005 July 8	2015 May 30	A sequel was announced in 2009 based initially on C4 Engine then shifted to CryEngine 3 but was never released. On October 10, 2014 Project Reality:BF2 developers announced Squad, based on Unreal Engine 4. Squad was released on September 23, 2020.
Red Alert: A Path Beyond	Command & Conquer: Renegade	2004 July 29	2007 September 14	The original mod was called Renegade Alert.
Red Orchestra: Ostfront 41-45	Unreal Tournament 2003	2003 October 10	2006 March 14	The original mod was called Red Orchestra: Combined Arms. The game has also received a sequel.
Renegade X	Unreal Tournament 3	2009 September	2012 January 28 (Black Dawn standalone release); 2016 February 26 (multiplayer standalone release)	The game has not been fully released.
Unturned	Roblox	2013 January 1	2014 July 7	The game was fully released on July 7, 2017, after exactly three years.
Smokin' Guns	Quake III Arena	2001	2009 January 5	Smokin' Guns was originally developed by Iron Claw Interactive under the name Western Quake 3 until 2005. A new team, Smokin' Guns Productions, released Smokin' Guns 1.0 as a standalone version based on the open-source Quake III engine in January 2009.
Spellsworn	Warcraft III: Reign of Chaos		2018 March 13	Spellsworn is the stand-alone version of the map Warlocks.
The Red Solstice	Warcraft III: Reign of Chaos		2014 July 10 (Early Access) 2015 July 9 (full release)	The original map was called Night Of The Dead, often shortened to NOTD. Marines fight zombies instead of aliens, with the classes and gameplay aspects remaining the same. The original developers were also involved in the production of The Red Solstice. A sequel, Red Solstice 2: Survivors, was released on 17 June 2021.
The Stanley Parable	Half-Life 2	2011 July 31	2013 October 17	Originally a mod for Half-Life 2, the 2013 release is built on Portal 2's version of the Source engine. An expanded edition was developed using the Unity engine and released in 2022.
Sven Co-op	Half-Life	1999 January 19	2016 January 22	This game had the longest delay between its mod release and its standalone release compared to all other games on this list: just over seventeen years.
Tactical Ops: Assault on Terror	Unreal Tournament	1999 December 23	2002 April 24	
Team Fortress Classic	Quake	1996	1999 April 7	The original mod (simply named Team Fortress) was a mod for Quake, but it was acquired by Valve and ported to GoldSrc for its standalone release as Team Fortress Classic. The game has also received a sequel.
Tiberian Sun Reborn	Command & Conquer: Renegade	2008	2013 June 1	The original mod was called CnC Reborn.
Tower Unite	Garry's Mod	2009 July 7	2016 April 8	The original mod was called GMod Tower
Tremulous	Quake III Arena	2005 August 11	2006 March 31	Tremulous is inspired by the Quake II modification Gloom, which also features alien vs. human teams with distinct user classes. Following the release of the Quake III Arena source code under the GPL on August 19, 2005, the developers decided to rework Tremulous into a standalone, free and open source game.
Urban Terror	Quake III Arena	1999 September	2007 April	Originally a freeware multiplayer first-person shooter total conversion, Urban Terror was released as a free standalone game in 2007 utilizing ioquake3. While the engine is open source, the game's assets and code are closed source.
The Wastes	Half-Life	2000 April 12 (as Wasteland Half-Life); 3 June 2003 (as The Wastes)	2018 April 12	The original mod would change its name to The Wastes sometime in 2002.
Vintage Story	Minecraft		2016 September 27	The original mod was called Vintagecraft, a mod based on Terrafirmacraft
Wings of Dawn	Freespace 2		2015 April 8	
World of Padman	Quake III Arena	2004 June 19	2007 April 1	The original mod was called PadMod and released in 2004. After the source code for Quake III Arena was released, the game became standalone. The concept is based on the Padman comic strip for the PlayStation Games magazine, created by the professional cartoon artist Andreas 'ENTE' Endres, who also made many of the maps included with the game in 1998. Later versions run on an enhanced version of the ioquake3 engine.
Wreckage	Crysis Warhead	2011 December 22	2012 May 4	
X-Men: The Ravages of Apocalypse	Quake	1997 November 30	2006	Despite being officially licensed by Marvel Comics, the game required Quake to be installed in order to play. In 2006, it was released as freeware and modified to not require Quake.

== See also ==
- List of game engines
- List of Source engine mods
- List of GoldSrc engine mods
