= Unvanquished (video game) =

2012 video game

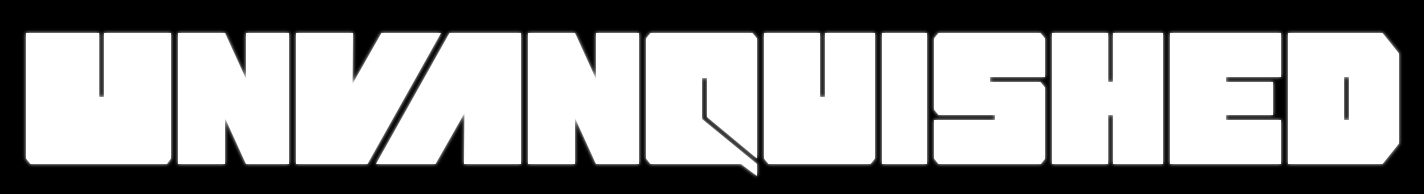

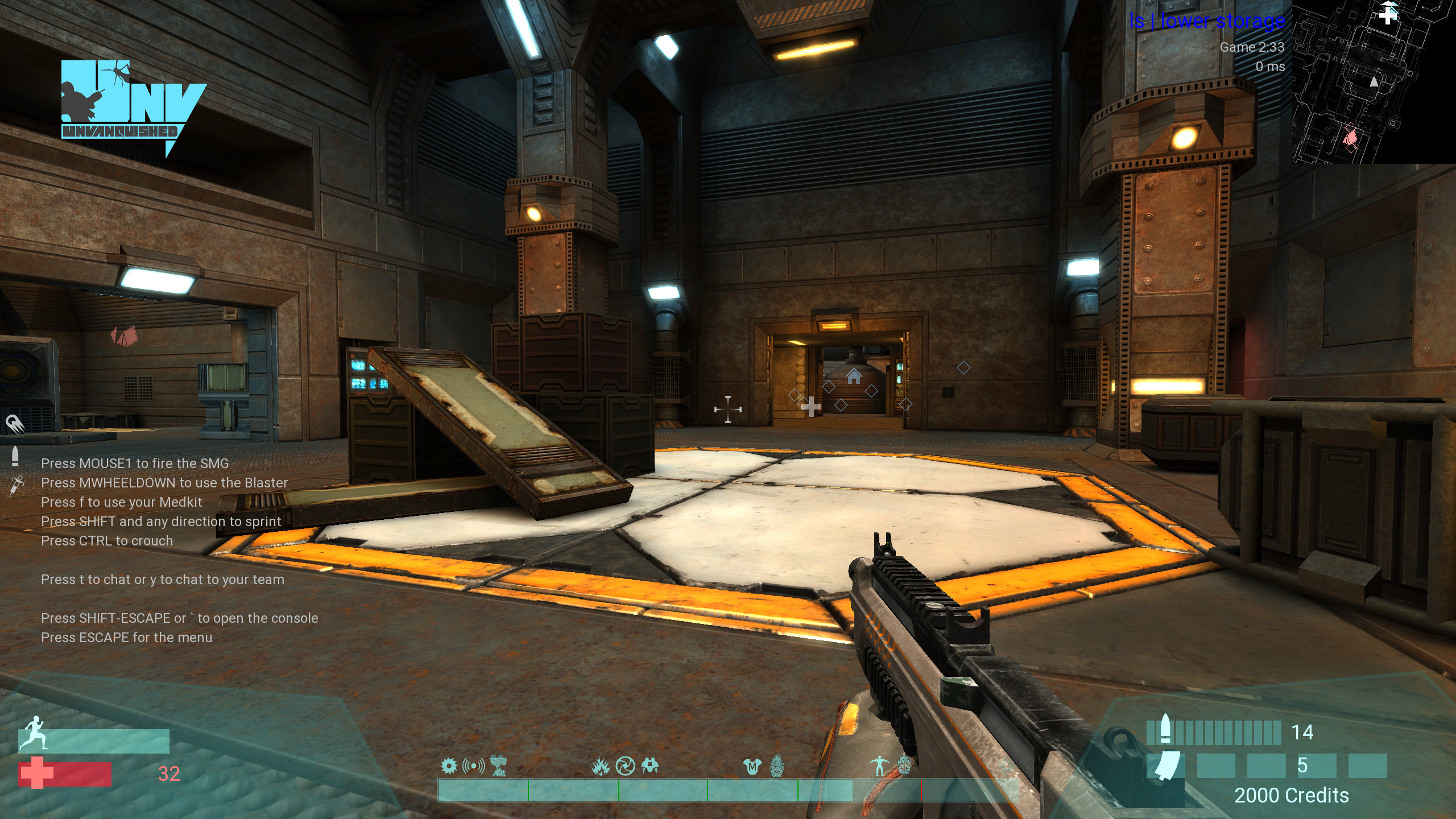
- Unvanquished 0.52 beta on-screen tutorial
- Developer: Game community
- Release: February 29, 2012; 14 years ago
- Preview release: 0.56.2 beta / May 12, 2026; 38 days ago
- Engine: Dæmon (game engine)
- Operating system: Linux, macOS, Windows
- Type: Multiplayer video game, first-person shooter, real-time strategy game
- License: GNU GPLv3, CC BY-SA 2.5
- Website: unvanquished.net
- Repository: github.com/Unvanquished/Unvanquished

Unvanquished is a free and open-source video game. It is a multiplayer first-person shooter and real-time strategy game where Humans and Aliens fight for domination.

== Gameplay ==
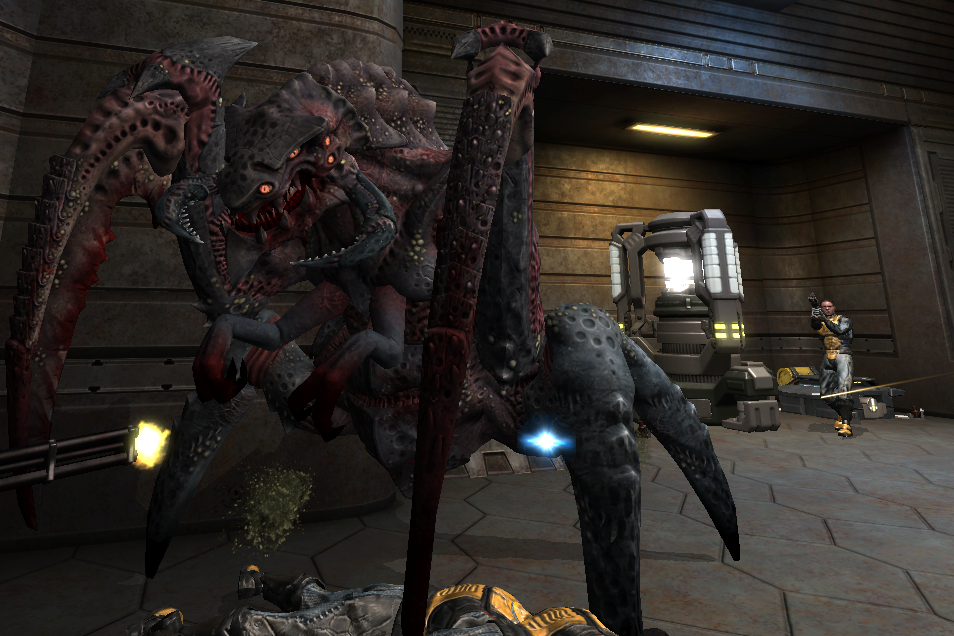
A large alien Tyrant is being attacked by a human (background) and a machine-gun turret (offscreen, left) as it tries to demolish the human base.

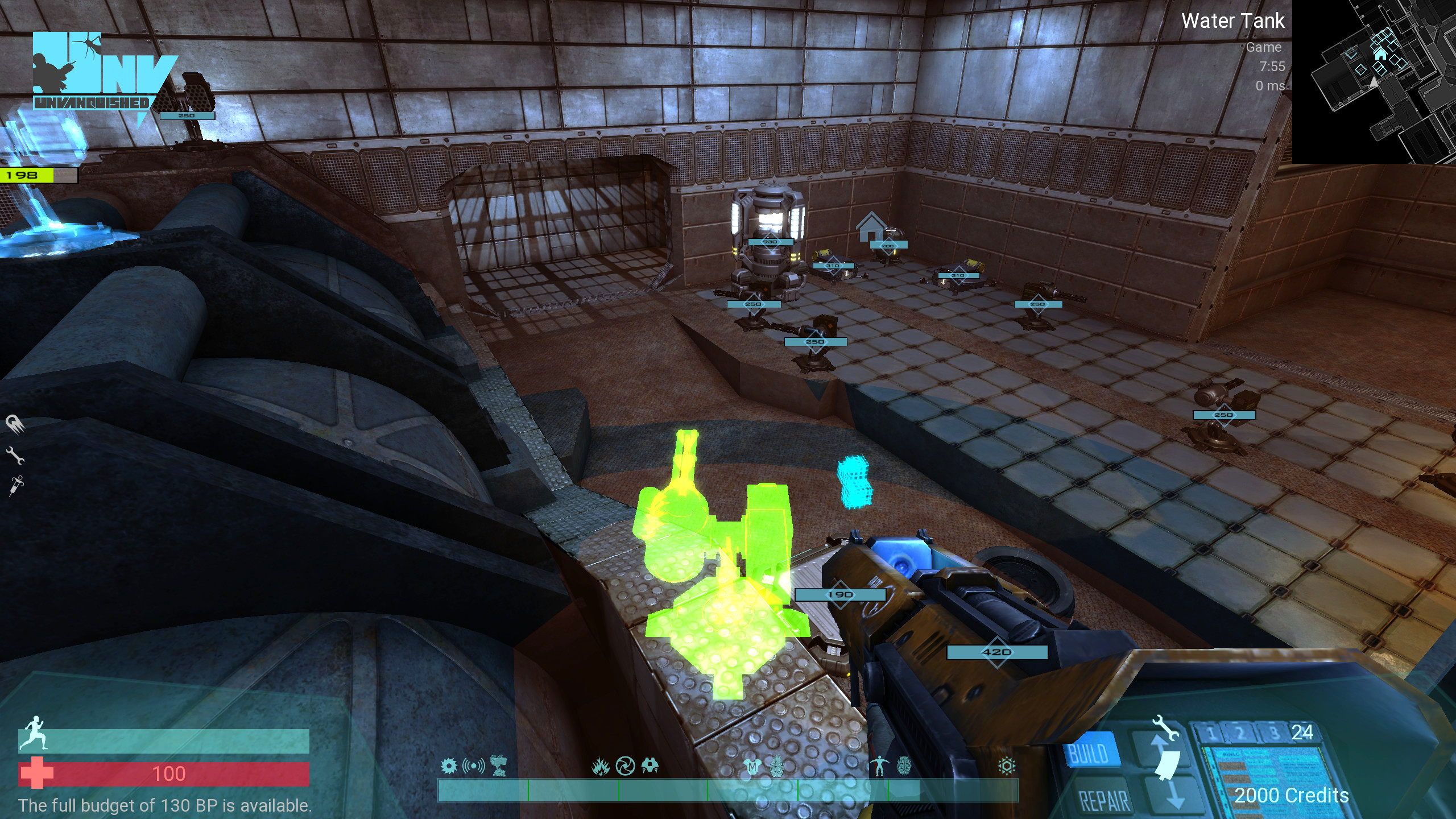
A human player building a defensive structure

Players fight in an alien or human team with respective melee and conventional ballistic weaponry. The aim of the game is to destroy the enemy team and the structures that keep them alive, as well as ensure one's own team's bases and expansions are maintained. Players earn resources for themselves and their team via aggression.

Commenting on gameplay, Lifewire noted: "One particularly fun aspect of Unvanquished is that as insects, players can crawl on the walls and ceilings, adding a new, though perhaps somewhat disorienting, take on game physics".

== Development ==
Unvanquished is a spiritual successor to Tremulous. The gameplay and game resources are under the CC BY-SA 2.5 Creative Commons license whilst the Dæmon engine is under the GPLv3.

Development began the summer of 2011 on SourceForge, with the first alpha version being released on February 29, 2012. While the code development was already happening on GitHub since 2012, the game release distribution moved from SourceForge to GitHub in 2015.

Unvanquished is developed by a team of volunteers who used to release a new Alpha on the first Sunday of every month. However, since the project reached a new stage of development, betas are released with less frequency.

== Engine ==
The lineage of the Daemon engine

Unvanquished uses the Dæmon Engine, born from a merge of the Wolfenstein: Enemy Territory engine (id Tech 3) and the XreaL engine. That merge was initially named OpenWolf before being renamed to Dæmon before the first alpha release of Unvanquished was released. Its development is now proceeding in its own path from its predecessors.

In 2015, with version 0.42, the Unvanquished developers managed to separate the game's engine code from the game's code by teaming up with developers of Xonotic.

Written in C++, the Dæmon engine relies on OpenGL, OpenAL and SDL technologies for rendering, display, audio and input device management. The engine sandboxes the game in a Native Client virtual machine, making possible for servers to distributes modifications (mod) written in C++ in a secure way for the player, and making possible for developers to produce game binaries independent from the operating system. Dæmon is multi-plateform and supports Linux, Windows, and macOS operating systems, along with x86, AMD64, ARM and ARM64 architectures.

The engine handles DXTC/S3TC, DirectDraw Surface (DDS) and CRN image formats, WebP, PNG, JPEG and Truevision Targa (TGA) image formats, Opus, Vorbis and WAV audio formats, and 3D animated formats InterQuake Model (IQM), MD5mesh/MD5anim (Doom 3 format) and MD3 (Quake III Arena format). The game level format is the BSP format from Quake III Arena and de Wolfenstein: Enemy Territory (implementing Binary space partitioning), the engine also supports the Quake III Arena material description format (also known as a “shader”), with extensions inspired by the Doom 3 format. The engine implements a multi-texture system that supports normal mapping, specular mapping, relief mapping, and PBR textures.

With the 0.56.0 release, Unvanquished and the Dæmon engine enabled the colorspace-aware rendering pipeline, freeing the rendering engine from limitations and mistakes inherited from historical games like Quake 3, as a requirement for physically based rendering.

== Reception ==
Michael Larabel from Phoronix.com praised Unvanquished's graphics in July 2012, while it was still in alpha state. Lifewire praised the insect mechanic as an interesting twist and the ease of modding (referring to the level editor).

Softpedia reviewed the game in version 0.49 in March 2016 and gave 3.5 stars.

Between 2011 and June 2017 the game was downloaded alone from SourceForge over 1.3 million times.

== See also ==
- List of open-source first-person shooters
- List of open-source video games
- Linux gaming
