= Dark Salvation =

2009 video game

- Promotional art showing the cover art, as well as the DVD and CD-ROM discs of the Dark Salvation Limited Unrated Dual-Disc edition
- Developer(s): Mangled Eye Studios
- Publisher(s): Mangled Eye Studios
- Designer(s): Thearrel McKinney
- Engine: id Tech 3
- Platform(s): Microsoft Windows
- Release: July 28, 2009
- Genre(s): First-person shooter
- Mode(s): Single-player

Dark Salvation is a gothic horror first-person shooter video game created by the now defunct American developer Mangled Eye Studios, released on July 28, 2009 for Microsoft Windows. The game follows the story of Talia, a young woman whose family is killed in the service of the demon Lucafix. After being trapped in his realm, she becomes possessed by the Spirit Crystal and must use its powers to escape from the underworld.

== Gameplay ==
The game is played in a manner similar to other first-person shooters. Players battle monsters while solving puzzles and avoiding traps. The game is seen from Talia's perspective. The game allows players to battle through fourteen levels using ten different weapons, each with the ability to cast spells.

== Development ==
The original idea behind Dark Salvation was created by Thearrel McKinney in 1999, with the goal of creating a mod that added an extra tier to Quake III Arena. The mod morphed into a stand-alone single player game. Work began on the final game in 2003 with the goal of "taking you back to the days of old school FPS shooters with its single player fast action game play." The game's soundtrack was developed by thirteen different bands, with their work showcased on a separate disk included with the Limited, Unrated, Dual-Disc Edition. Talia was voiced by Jessica Eastwood, who died shortly before the game's release; Tayana was voiced by Lindsey Brannock. Additional work on the game was done by Andrew Darovich. A major update for the game was released after eight years, upgrading it to v1.0.7 and re-releasing the game on itch.io on May 21, 2017.
