= Nantun =

Nantun (Chinese: 南屯; pinyin: nántún), meaning "south, side", may refer to:

- Nantun District, Taichung, Taiwan
- Nantun (南屯市), Xinjiang, China
- Nantun Town (南屯镇), Tiemenguan City, Xinjiang, China
- Nantun Township (南屯乡), Laiyuan County, Baoding, Hebei Province, China
- Nantun Village (南屯村), Huoxian, Tongzhou District, Beijing, China
- Nantun Village (南屯村), Jindong, Xinyi, Guangdong Province, China
