= Star Trek: Voyager – Elite Force =

2000 video game

- The Elite Force box art, displaying the common delta symbol used by Starfleet in the series
- Developer: Raven Software (Note: Ported to Mac OS by Westlake Interactive; ported to PlayStation 2 by Pipe Dream Interactive.)
- Publishers: Activision: Mac OS; Aspyr; PlayStation 2; NA: Majesco; PAL: Codemasters
- Director: Brian Pelletier
- Designer: Christopher Foster
- Programmer: James Monroe
- Artist: Les Dorscheid
- Writer: Michael Chang Gummelt
- Composer: Kevin Schilder
- Series: Star Trek
- Engine: id Tech 3
- Platforms: Windows; Mac OS; PlayStation 2
- Release: Windows: EU: September 15, 2000; NA: September 20, 2000; Mac OS: NA: November 20, 2000; PlayStation 2: NA: December 11, 2001; EU: August 2, 2002; AU: August 16, 2002
- Genre: First-person shooter
- Modes: Single-player, multiplayer

Star Trek: Voyager – Elite Force is a first-person shooter video game developed by Raven Software and published by Activision. The game was originally released on September 15, 2000 for Windows and Mac OS. A port for Mac OS developed by Westlake Interactive and published by Aspyr Media was released on November 20, 2002. Elite Force was ported to the PlayStation 2 by Pipe Dream Interactive and published by Majesco on December 11, 2001.

The game is set in the Star Trek universe, specifically relating to the fifth Star Trek television series, Star Trek: Voyager. The dates in the game place Elite Force's plot late in Voyager's sixth season. The player assumes the role of Ensign Alex Munro, a member of the Hazard Team, a new elite security section created to deal with particularly dangerous and hostile away missions. The game's plot focuses on the USS Voyager being trapped in a starship graveyard, heavily damaged and under attack from a variety of hostile factions. The Hazard Team is tasked with protecting Voyager as repairs are made, and investigating the cause of their entrapment.

Elite Force was one of several Star Trek games announced after Activision secured the license to Star Trek video games from Viacom in 1998. The game was one of the first to license id Tech 3, a game engine by id Software used by a number of video games during the early 2000s. Elite Force was a critical success, and is often praised as the first truly successful Star Trek video game, able to appeal to people who were not Star Trek fans. Raven Software released an expansion pack to the game in May 2001, while Wildstorm adapted the story for a short graphic novel in July 2000. A sequel developed by Ritual Entertainment, Star Trek: Elite Force II, was published in 2003. The game was one of six Star Trek titles re-released on GoG.com in celebration of the franchise's 55th anniversary in September 2021.

== Gameplay ==
Borg characters will adapt to the player's weapons over time, making them harder to harm.

An example of the first-person shooter genre, Elite Force is based on gameplay conventions shared by multiple other games. The game is focused on story-driven combat within a 3D environment, with all activity viewed as if through the eyes of the game's protagonist. The player controls the movement of the player character through walking, crouching, jumping or interacting with the environment. The only exception to this is in cut scenes, where the player loses control of the character to a third-person view for scripted events. The player character possesses numerical values for their health and armor, which are displayed on the game's heads-up display. As the player character takes damage from non-player characters and certain aspects of the environment, both values will decrease; when the health value reaches zero, the player character will die. Armor lessens the impact to the player character's health from hostile action, but once depleted the player will be more susceptible to damage. However, both armor and health can be restored by using wall-mounted terminals or from receiving assistance from certain friendly non-player characters such as the Doctor.

Elite Force includes an arsenal of Star Trek–themed weapons, such as phasers and disruptors. The weapons vary in power, ammunition consumption and effectiveness in given situations. Usually, the player is equipped with a hand phaser, a low-damage weapon that automatically recharges ammunition, and a phaser compression rifle, a more powerful weapon with an optional sniper mode for long distance kills. Other weapons, acquired as the game progresses, include grenade launchers, stasis weaponry and pulse energy weapons. The player can restock on ammunition by using wall-mounted terminals that dispense weapon energy, or by picking up certain items in the game environment.

=== Single-player ===
The game's single-player campaign consists of around 30 linear levels, divided up into eight distinct missions. Missions have different objectives, from retrieving a particular item and accessing computer systems, escorting a friendly character through hostile territory, or destroying vital ship and station components. Enemies come in multiple forms in the game, often as Star Trek species such as the Borg and the Klingons. Each group of enemies uses a different means of attacking: most humanoid enemies are armed with weapons similar to the player, and will use cover and squad tactics to attempt to kill the player character. The Borg differ from this in that, instead of using squad tactics, they eventually adapt their personal energy shields to most of the player's weapons, slowly rendering the player's attacks useless as they advance. Other enemies may attempt to swarm the player and eliminate them with melee attacks.

The player is usually accompanied by one or more friendly non-player characters, who will follow the player and provide assistance in combat against enemies. As they are often key to the story, friendly characters must not be killed in combat except during scripted events. In between combat missions, the player can move around the USS Voyager and interact with other members of its crew, often performing non-combat tasks to progress the story.

=== Multiplayer ===
Elite Force was originally released with a 32-player multiplayer element, in which participants use the weaponry and characters from the single-player game to compete in several different game modes. Referred to as a "holomatch", the multiplayer is themed as though it were a holodeck experience. Players can compete against other players in local area network and Internet games, or play against bots, opponents that use the game's artificial intelligence. Each player can choose one of a variety of Star Trek characters as their aesthetic player character in multiplayer. The initial release contained multiplayer game modes shared by other multiplayer games in the genre. The standard "deathmatch" game mode involves each player moving around a level, collecting weaponry and killing the other players, with the first to reach a particular number of kills, winning. As player characters are killed, they respawn into the game after a short time. "Team deathmatch" follows the same principle, albeit grouping the players into teams to do so. Capture the flag involves two teams of players attempting to retrieve a flag within the other team's base and returning it to their own to score.

The Elite Force expansion pack added an additional five-game types. In an "assimilation" match, one team plays as Borg and must attempt to assimilate the other team; if a player is assimilated, they join the Borg team, gradually reducing the number of players on the other team. The "action hero" mode gives one player more weapons, health, and overall power than every other player, but when an opposing player kills this player they take these advantages. A further game type known as "elimination" is a deathmatch game except that players can't respawn. As player characters are killed, they sit out the remainder of the round until only one player is left alive. The "disintegration" mode gives every player a slow firing semi-automatic phaser rifle that will kill and vaporize an opposing player in one shot, thus requiring shots to be carefully aimed to ensure they hit. The final game mode, called "specialties," adds a class-based mode for team deathmatch and capture the flag modes, giving players the option to choose from one of six combat roles, such as a sniper, medic or infiltrator, each with different weapons, speeds and abilities.

== Synopsis ==
=== Setting ===
Elite Force is based on the fourth Star Trek television series, Star Trek: Voyager. The series follows the adventures of the Starfleet vessel USS Voyager, which is stranded by an enigmatic alien power in the Delta Quadrant of the Milky Way galaxy. 70,000 light-years from Federation space, the series shows Voyager's effort to make the 75-year journey home. The stardate of 53854.7 given in the game places Elite Force in the latter parts of the sixth season of Star Trek: Voyager, in the year 2376. Significant parts of the game are set on Voyager itself, although much of the game takes place on away missions to other ships and space stations. The player interacts with several races from the series, such as the Borg, Hirogen and Malon, as well as new species created solely for the game.

=== Characters ===
The core Hazard Team; from left to right: Chang, Jurot, Foster, the male version of Munro, Murphy, Chell, Biessman

Elite Force incorporates a large cast of characters, both original characters created for the game and characters from the television series. All nine of the core Voyager characters in the sixth season appear, such as Captain Kathryn Janeway and Lieutenant Commander Tuvok, each voiced by the appropriate cast member from the television series. The only exception to this is the character of Seven of Nine, who was voiced by Joan Buddenhagen in the initial release; however, actress Jeri Ryan retroactively replaced Buddenhagen's voice through a later patch and the expansion pack. The player takes on the role of Ensign Alex Munro; depending on the player's choice of gender, Alex is short for either Alexander or Alexandria. Munro is the second in command of an elite security force, the Hazard Team, a special unit created by Tuvok. Munro reports to Lieutenant Les Foster, the team's commanding officer. Although fourteen characters make up the Hazard Team, the player only interacts consistently with a limited number of these characters, among them Telsia Murphy, the team's scout and sharpshooter, Austin Chang, a demolitionist and good friend of Munro's, and Kendrick Biessman, a boisterous heavy weapons specialist. In addition, two core members of the Hazard Team are minor characters from the television series itself: Juliet Jurot, the team's combat medic and a telepath, is seen in the episode "Counterpoint", while Chell, the squad's technician, is an apprehensive Bolian character who appears in several Voyager episodes. Most character development, such as Munro's growing relationship with Murphy, takes place between missions, when the player has the chance to explore areas of the ship and interact with the crew.

=== Plot ===
The game opens with the Hazard Team conducting a holodeck training exercise set on a Borg ship; however, the team fails the exercise as most get captured by the Borg, and Munro accidentally destroys the ship while trying to rescue them. Following the termination of the exercise, Voyager is attacked by an unidentified ship. Voyager manages to destroy the ship, but takes heavy damage in the battle. The hostile ship explodes, emitting a shockwave that teleports the now–crippled Voyager to an unknown location, surrounded by derelict ships. As the Voyager crew attempts repairs, the ship is boarded by scavengers, who steal some of Voyager's cargo supplies before being driven off. In an effort to establish where Voyager is, the Hazard Team is sent to a derelict ship where power is still functioning to download the derelict's database. The mission goes awry when aliens begin transporting in and attacking the team; however, the aliens, identifying themselves as Etherians, eventually manage to communicate with the team, and the ordeal is waved off as a misunderstanding, allowing the Hazard Team to access the Etherian database.

Through the Etherians, Voyager learns of an energy field being projected by a gigantic space station, the Forge, which is draining power and preventing repairs from being completed. To counteract the effects of the field, chief engineer B'Elanna Torres suggests the use of a rare substance called Isodesium, and the Hazard Team is sent on a stealth mission to the scavenger base to steal their supplies of Isodesium. However, the mission is a disaster: despite acquiring the Isodesium, one crewman is briefly captured and another team member is critically injured. As the team attempts to extract, Borg drones transport into the extraction point, killing another team member, capturing Lieutenant Foster and taking the Isodesium. In Foster's absence, Munro is made the team leader. Along with Seven of Nine, the team transports to the Borg cube to retrieve the Isodesium. While on the cube, Munro is given the chance to rescue Foster from assimilation by the Borg. Matters are complicated when the Borg corner the team, leveraging their freedom and the Isodesium for assistance against a number of Species 8472 on board, a race highly resistant to the Borg. Although successful, the Borg attempt to assimilate the team; anticipating a double cross, however, Munro has Chang detonate an explosive in a sensitive part of the cube and the team escapes with the Isodesium in the chaos.

As Voyager installs the Isodesium, a ship is sent from the Forge to tear Voyager apart for resources. Tuvok leads the Hazard Team to a nearby derelict dreadnought gunship to use the gunship's weaponry to destroy the incoming ship, but is only successful in disabling it as it attaches to Voyager. Voyager is consequently swarmed by crab-like aliens intent on carrying off crew and cargo, although the crew manages to eliminate these aliens. Munro prompts the captain to counterattack, in order to destroy the dampening field projected by the station. The Hazard Team uses the Forge's ship to infiltrate the Forge and disable its defensive systems, allowing the Voyager crew to attack using shuttlecraft; however, Biessman is killed while holding off attacking aliens allowing Voyager's reinforcements time to arrive. The Forge's power core is destroyed, thereby dropping the dampening field. Munro, however, learns of the species behind the Forge, the Vohrsoth, and the station's true purpose: to harvest the genetic features of those trapped by the Forge to create an army designed for conquering the galaxy. Munro disobeys orders to ensure the Vohrsoth cannot recreate the Forge and kills the Vohrsoth commander. With power restored, Voyager attacks the Forge and destroys the station, beaming Munro off in the last few moments. Voyager and other active ships in the area are freed, and Munro is promoted to lieutenant.

== Development ==
The main cast of Voyager and several sets from the TV series, such as the bridge and engineering, were recreated in Elite Force.

Publisher Activision acquired the rights to produce Star Trek video games from Viacom in September 1998. With Viacom leaving the video game industry, Activision's licensing agreement allowed the publisher to hold the rights to Star Trek video games for ten years. Development on the game started in January 1999. Elite Force was one of several Star Trek games announced shortly afterward. Developed by Raven Software, a company whose past projects included the first-person shooters Heretic and Soldier of Fortune, Elite Force was developed using technology created by id Software. Elite Force was one of the first games to license id Tech 3, the game engine which debuted with Quake III: Arena. During late 1999 and early 2000, Raven revealed several screenshots and discussed the premise of the game, with Activision setting a release date for the second quarter of 2000. Activision presented a demonstration of Elite Force at the E3 convention in May 2000, alongside Away Team and Bridge Commander. In the months following the E3 convention, the biographies of several of the game's key characters were released as promotional material. On August 29, 2000, Activision announced that Raven Software had completed development on Elite Force, stating that the game would be released later in September. Elite Force was consequently published in Europe on September 15, 2000, and in North America on September 20. A version for Mac OS developed by Westlake Interactive and published by Aspyr was released on November 20. Raven continued to support the game post-release, with the addition of patches and bonus content for the game's multiplayer mode.

In a June 2000 interview, Raven Software co-founder Brian Raffel stated that one of the objectives of the game was to make the player feel "like [they're] part of a Voyager episode". To this end, Elite Force extensively uses scripted sequences to interact with non-player characters, convey plot information and build up the immersion in the game's setting, with Valve's first-person shooter title Half-Life cited as a direct inspiration. However, in contrast to Half-Life, the player is given the ability to influence the outcome of some scripted sequences, which can often involve the injury or death of other characters, sometimes with immediate or delayed repercussions depending on the player's actions. Over fifty in-game cut scenes were produced for Elite Force, in addition to computer-generated cinematics. In addition, large portions of the USS Voyager were recreated from the series to enhance the player's immersion in the Star Trek setting.

== Versions and sequels ==
=== Graphic novel ===
Prior to the release of Elite Force, Wildstorm published a graphic novel based on Raven Software's story. The graphic novel was released in July 2000 as part of a Star Trek: Voyager graphic novel series produced by Wildstorm, written by British comic book authors Dan Abnett and Andy Lanning. The book's artwork was produced by Jeffrey Moy and W.C. Carani. The book follows a broadly similar storyline to that of the game, predominantly focusing on USS Voyager being trapped by the Forge, which is controlled by an ancient race, the Tarlus, for the purpose of creating an army to conquer the galaxy. The Elite Force graphic novel focuses on a limited number of the Hazard Team, and does not expand on the plot points created by the Etherians and the scavengers in the game, instead using the Borg to fill in these roles.

=== PlayStation 2 port ===
The development of a PlayStation 2 version of Elite Force was announced in late 2000. Whereas the original version of Elite Force had been published by Activision and developed by Raven Software, the PlayStation 2 version was published by Majesco and developed by their in-house studio, Pipe Dream Interactive. Elite Force was to be the second PlayStation 2 project undertaken by Majesco. The PlayStation 2 version of the game includes most of the same content as the computer version of the game, albeit that the game's graphics were simplified slightly for the console. Due to the lack of online support for the PlayStation 2, the port only allows for four players to compete in a multiplayer game. Pipe Dream paid particular attention to adjusting the controls of the game to suit the PlayStation 2's gamepad, introducing an auto-aim feature to assist the player. The first screenshots of the game were released in March 2001, and the game was released in North America on December 11, 2001. United Kingdom-based publisher EON Digital was set to publish the PlayStation 2 port in Europe, but was unable to due to financial difficulties. Codemasters handled publishing duties in PAL territories, releasing the game in Europe on August 2, 2002, and in Australia on August 16, 2002.

=== Expansion Pack for PC ===
An expansion pack to the computer version of Elite Force was announced by Activision in February 2001. The expansion pack does not add new campaign content in the conventional sense, rather adding a "Virtual Voyager" mode to the game, allowing the player to explore ten more decks of the ship. Within these ten levels, the player can interact with a variety of characters, collect secret items and operate various ship functions such as using replicators, reading characters' personal logs and accessing the ship's computer files. Two new combat campaigns are added, integrated as holodeck programs; the first revolves around Tom Paris' black-and-white Captain Proton hobby, while the second is based around an infiltration mission into a Klingon base. In addition, five new multiplayer modes were introduced. Development was completed on May 5, 2001, and the expansion pack was released on May 16, 2001. With ratings of 59 percent and 62 percent on the aggregator sites GameRankings and Metacritic, respectively, the expansion did not enjoy the critical acclaim of the original material. While the pack was considered to maintain its predecessor's production values, it was thought to lack the focus and breadth of the original game. As well as updating the original to the latest version, the expansion pack also replaced Joan Buddenhagen's Seven of Nine character voice with that of Jeri Ryan.

=== Freeware release ===
The multiplayer Holomatch component was released as freeware in August 2020 for the game's twentieth anniversary, and was packaged with the ioquake3 derived cMod engine for Windows and Linux by fan community The Last Outpost.

== Reception ==
=== Sales ===
Star Trek: Voyager – Elite Force sold below forecasts. According to PC Data, which tracked computer game sales in the United States, the game sold 64,725 copies and earned $2,933,204 (~$5.2 million in 2025) in gross revenue by the end of 2000. It ultimately drew revenues of $15 million and sold roughly 300,000 units worldwide by 2003. In 2018, project lead Brian Pelletier said that he "was expecting better sales than what we got". According to author Erik Bethke, Activision had anticipated sales between 700,000 and 1 million units in the game's first 12 months. Despite its underperformance, James Hoyle of Den of Geek summarized Elite Force's sales as "good".

=== Critical reviews ===
Reception

Aggregate scores
Aggregator	Score
GameRankings	(PC) 86% (PS2) 54%
Metacritic	(PC) 86/100 (PS2) 52/100

Review scores
Publication	Score
Eurogamer	8/10 (PC)
GamePro	5/5 (PC)
GameRevolution	B+ (PC); D+ (PS2)
GameSpot	8.6/10 (PC); 6.2/10 (PS2)
GameSpy	91% (PC)
IGN	8.6/10 (PC); 6/10 (PS2)
Next Generation	4/5
PC Gamer (UK)	93% (PC)

Elite Force received "universal acclaim" from critics, scoring 86 percent on the review aggregator sites Metacritic and GameRankings. Praise was bestowed on the game's visuals, characters, level design, narrative, gameplay and graphics, although divisive opinions focused on the perceived short length of the game's single-player campaign. In addition, Elite Force was recipient to several Editor's Choice commendations from individual publications. During the 4th Annual Interactive Achievement Awards, the Academy of Interactive Arts & Sciences nominated Elite Force in the "PC Action/Adventure" category.

A number of reviews praised Elite Force's gameplay and level design. The battles were described by GameSpot as "particularly intense", enhanced by friendly non-player characters being "surprisingly responsive" in combat, giving the player the sense that they are "not doing all the fighting by [themselves]". While GameSpy voiced the view that Elite Force does not deviate radically from other games in the genre, it stated that "what it does do, it does extremely well". Admiring the game's pacing, GameSpy noted that the use of periods with character interaction rather than combat helped prevent the game becoming a "continuous onslaught" and allowed the story to flow smoothly, a point echoed by GameSpot. However, both GameSpot and GameSpy were critical of the game's artificial intelligence in some circumstances, leading friendly characters to get in the way of the player during firefights. IGN was impressed with the variety of gameplay, from finding solutions to problems in coordination with other characters, engaging in stealth missions and pursuing a wide selection of objectives within the individual missions. Several reviewers were complimentary towards the design of the weapons in the game, commenting that they were powerful and fun to use as well as fitting for the Star Trek theme.

The game's graphics were thought to be very good, using the id Tech 3 engine effectively. Describing the graphics as superb, Game Revolution commented that "from detailed weapons to terrific lighting effects to smooth character animation, everything just looks great". Eurogamer commented that the characters were "very well done" on the engine, although Allgame felt that the character models for the original Voyager cast were "just a little off". Other reviewers were equally impressed; IGN described the graphics as "fantastic" while GameSpy commented that "in each environment it's obvious that the artists were limited only by their imaginations". Next Generation stated that "Raven's made the already impressive graphics code crackle with excellent textures, gorgeous lighting effects, and heavy usage of the engine's curvy nature to create pulsing, organic alien levels."

Elite Force's attention to immersing the player within the Star Trek universe was praised as one of the stronger points of the game; GamePro suggested that even people who were not fans of the franchise "will marvel at the amount of detail in the ships and characters", further praising the game's "faithful" recreation of key sets of the USS Voyager in the TV series. Many reviewers were positive towards the game's story, GameSpy suggesting that the plot "really draws you in", while IGN praised the story as one in stark contrast to many of the poorly produced storylines used in the TV series. However, many reviewers felt that the game's single-player campaign was too short, while others felt the game's closing levels were disappointing.

Due to shared technology and similar gameplay conventions, critics often compared Elite Force's multiplayer to that in Quake III: Arena, with varied opinions. For their part, Raven Software stated that so little had been fundamentally changed that the multiplayer could almost be labeled as a modification of Quake III. Game Revolution commented that the multiplayer felt more refined than that in Quake III and innovative in its attempt to mimic a holodeck, and while Eurogamer agreed with the latter, criticisms were directed towards the gameplay seeming "very slow and unexciting". However, other reviewers disagreed; IGN described the multiplayer as "a solid experience", and GamePro expressed that it helped compensate for the short length of the single-player campaign.

There was a consensus amongst reviewers that Elite Force was the first truly successful Star Trek game, standing out from past titles deemed to be mediocre in quality and design. Game Revolution stated that Elite Force managed to "fight off the curse which until now has plagued most Star Trek action games", while IGN enthusiastically proclaimed "Trekkies, rejoice! You've finally got something to be proud of". GamePro further commented that "you don't even have to be a full-fledged Trekker to appreciate the gaming goodness that Elite Force has to offer". GameSpot put Elite Force's success down to the influence of Half-Life and its expansion Opposing Force, noting that the influence of these games is "evident in Elite Force's level design". GameSpy closed its review by putting Elite Force as one of the year's best first-person shooters, and "almost certainly the best Star Trek game period, a franchise infamous for its string of bad titles". Likewise, PC Gamer UK commended the game as "the best Star Trek game ever, and a first-rate FPS in its own right".

Although the original PC version of Elite Force gained critical acclaim, the 2001 PlayStation 2 port received a more negative reception. Majesco's port of the game garnered mediocre reviews, holding scores of 54 percent and 52 percent on Game Rankings and Metacritic respectively. While the level design, story and atmosphere were praised, critics were negative towards what was seen to be a poorly performed port, with complaints focused on difficult controls, graphical problems and frame rate issues. In addition, the artificial intelligence was deemed to be significantly worse than the earlier PC incarnation of the game. Several reviews suggested that Majesco had simply not put effort into the port, resulting in a level of quality behind that which was expected of PlayStation 2 games at the time.

Since its release, Elite Force has often featured in retrospective lists comparing it with other Star Trek games. A 2009 Kotaku list put Elite Force as one of the top three Star Trek games, Den of Geek ranked Elite Force as one of the top four Star Trek games in 2016, while Tom's Guide ranked it among the top ten Star Trek games in 2016, and PC Gamer noted Elite Force among the best Star Trek games in 2017. In 2020, Screen Rant ranked it the third best Star Trek game.

== Sequel ==
Towards the end of March 2002, rumors were reported that a sequel to Elite Force was in development. Activision confirmed these rumors at the beginning of April, announcing Star Trek: Elite Force II on April 4, 2002. The game was the last Star Trek title to be developed under Activision's supervision, following a dispute with Star Trek licensing holder Viacom, and was produced by Ritual Entertainment. Like Elite Force, Elite Force II was developed on the id Tech 3 game engine, one of the last games to do so. Most of the core Hazard Team characters return in Elite Force II, this time set on the USS Enterprise-E following the events of the tenth film, Star Trek: Nemesis. Elite Force II was released in June 2003 to favorable reviews from critics, although with ratings of 80 percent and 78 percent on the review aggregator sites GameRankings and Metacritic, it was not as successful as its predecessor.
