= Liushan =

Liushan may refer to these places in China:

- Liushan Subdistrict (刘山街道), a subdistrict of Xinfu District, Fushun, Liaoning

== Towns ==
- Liushan, Guangxi (流山), in Liuzhou, Guangxi
- Liushan, Henan (留山), in Nanzhao County, Henan
- Liushan, Shandong (柳山), in Linqu County, Shandong

== See also ==
- Liu Shan (207–271), Shu Han emperor
