= TJW =

- Djabwurrung language, an Aboriginal Australian language (ISO 639-3 code: tjw)
- Tom John Ward, actor/writer in Please Like Me
- Tony J. White, a key developer of the ETPub mod for Wolfenstein: Enemy Territory that contributed an administrative system and a backported client for Tremulous that were incorporated into the official Subversion (software) repository
- Tyrel Jackson Williams, American rapper and signer who formerly used the stage name TJW.
