= Dretch =

Dretch may refer to:

- A type of small alien in the game Tremulous
- Dretch, a type of demon in the Dungeons & Dragons role-playing game
