= OpenArena =

Free and open-source video game

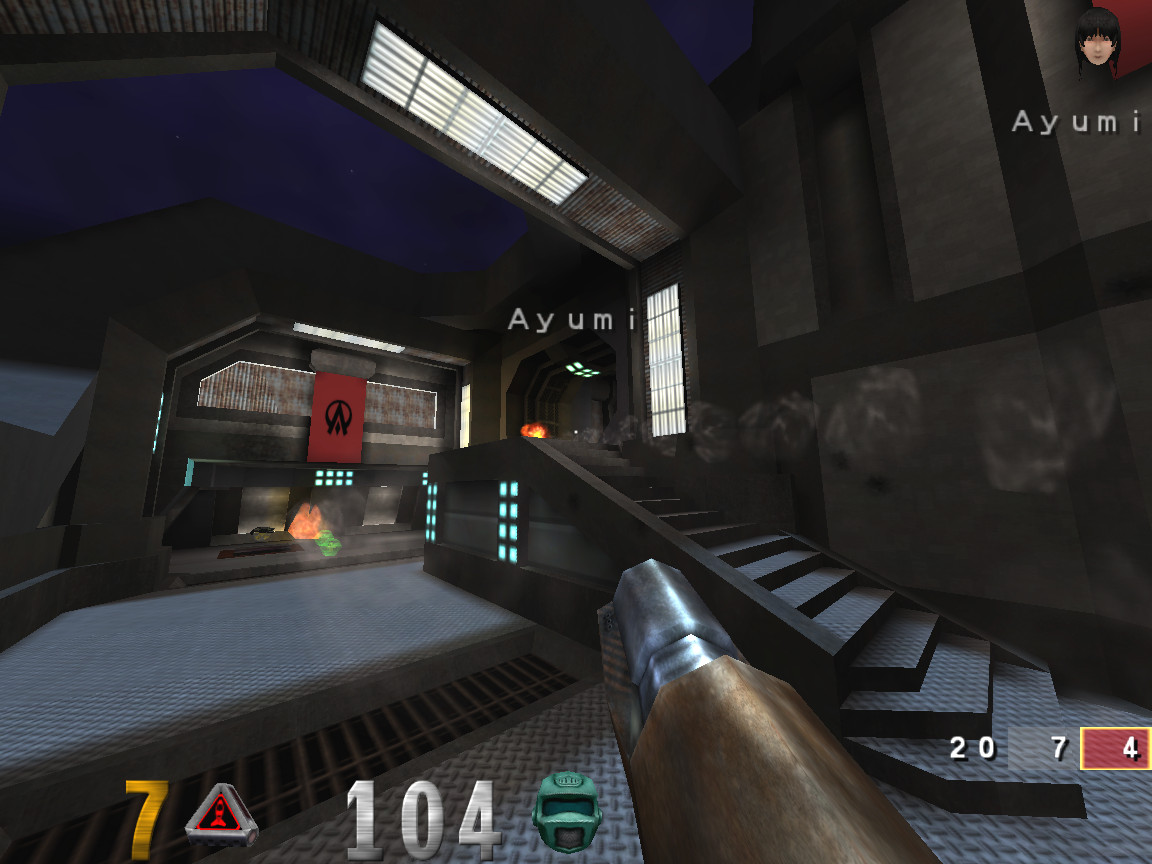
- Screenshot from version 0.8.8 (2012)
- Developer: Free software community
- Release: 2005; 21 years ago
- Stable release: 0.8.8 / February 2012; 14 years ago
- Written in: C with the ioquake3 game engine
- Engine: ioquake3
- Platform: Unix-like; Microsoft Windows; macOS; Android; iOS; Ouya; Pandora; BlackBerry 10; AmigaOS 4
- Type: Single-player, multiplayer First-person shooter
- License: GPL-2.0-or-later
- Website: lei-lei.neocities.org/openarena/
- Repository: github.com/OpenArena

OpenArena is a free and open-source video game. It is a first-person shooter, and a fork of ioquake which in itself was a fork of Quake III Arena.

== Development ==
The OpenArena project was established on August 19, 2005, one day after the id Tech 3 source code released under GNU GPL-2.0-or-later license.

OpenArena was officially released for Microsoft Windows, Linux and macOS. Third parties have also ported the game to FreeBSD, OpenBSD, Android and iOS. The game was also unofficially ported to the Raspberry Pi.

== Gameplay ==
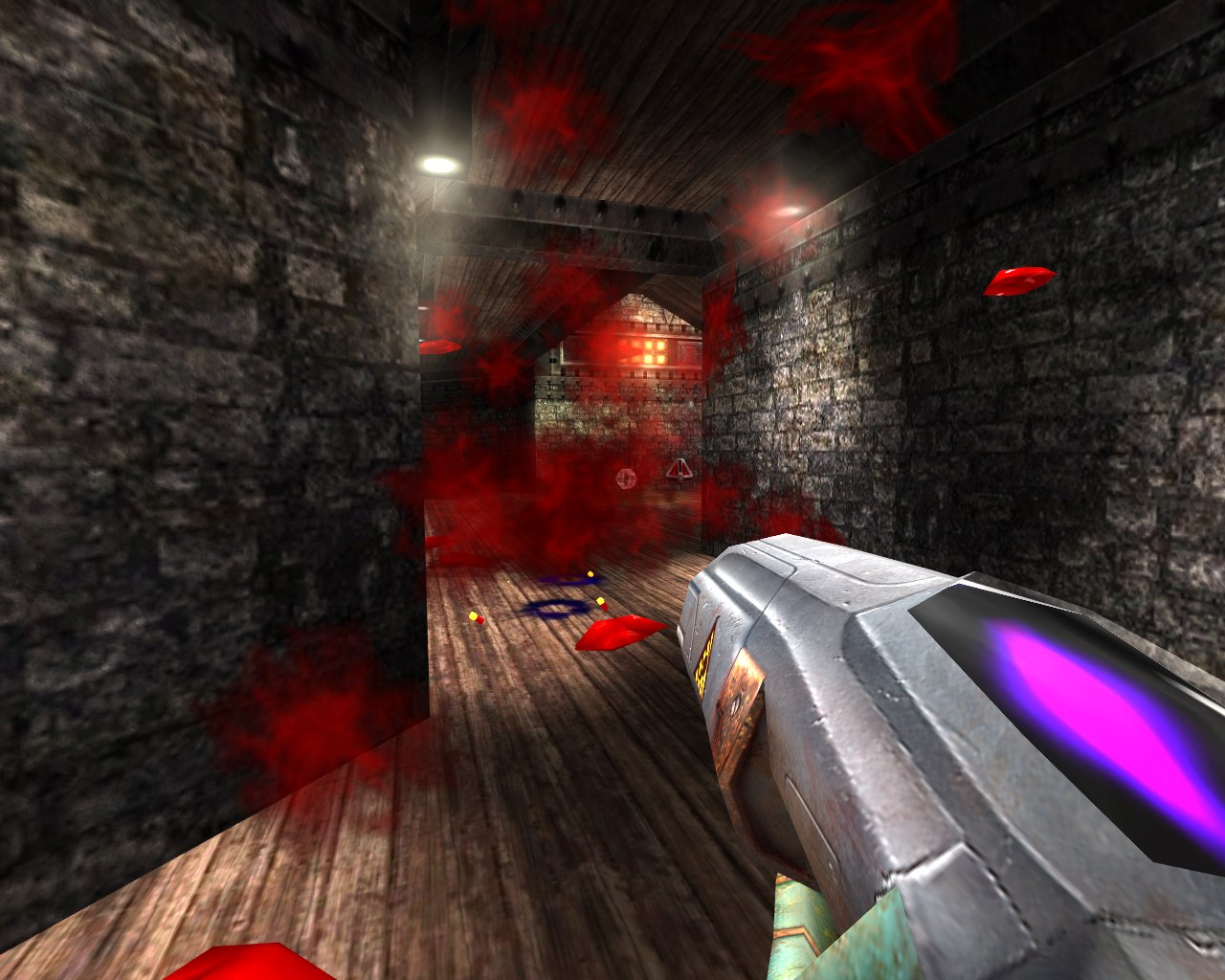
Screenshot showing gibs in OpenArena

OpenArena's gameplay mirrors that of Quake III Arena with some quality of life improvements, such as awarding a character points for pushing another character to their death. The game can be played online (against other human players) or offline (against computer-controlled characters known as bots). "Singleplayer" mode allows players to play a predefined series of deathmatches, unlocking a new "tier" of four maps after completing the previous one, or to create custom matches in any game type through the "skirmish" mode.

=== Game modes ===
OpenArena has the following gamemodes:

- Free For All: classic Deathmatch where players are all pitted against each other and the player who has the highest score at the end of the match wins.
- Team Deathmatch: a team-based variation of Free For All, with two teams of players being pitted against the other.
- Tournament: The game chooses two players in the server and makes them duel, in a classic "winner stays, loser gets out" setting.
- Capture the Flag: team-based mode where each team spawns in a base which contains a flag. They must capture the enemy team's flag while keeping their own flag from being captured.
- One Flag CTF: a variation of Capture The Flag where a white flag spawns in the middle of the map and the teams must bring it to the enemy base.
- Harvester: Each team spawns with a Skull Receptacle with a Skull Generator that spawns in the middle of the map. By fragging enemies, skulls appear in this generator. The players must collect skulls of enemy players bring them to the enemy base in order to score.
- Overload: Each team has a crystal in their base. The players of each team must travel to the enemy base and destroy this crystal in order to win.
- Elimination: a team based mode where both players must frag all of their enemies in a "Last Man Standing" style match. The team with the highest number of points wins.
- CTF Elimination: a mix of Capture The Flag and Elimination. Teams score by fragging all enemy players or capturing flags.
- Last Man Standing: a non-team variation of Elimination where all of the players start with a finite number of lives and frag each other until only one of them remains.
- Double Domination: a team-based mode which features two control points, and the players must hold them in order to score points.
- Domination: a team-based mode that has control points scattered throughout the map; the players must secure these points in order to gain points for their teams.

== Reception and impact ==
The game is one of the most popular open-source first-person shooters, particularly among fans of the original Quake III Arena. However, some others has criticized it as incomplete, saying that this detracts from long term play. The game has been praised for its portability and ability to run on old hardware, as well as creative bot design. OpenArena has been used as a platform for scholarly work in computer science. Some examples include streaming graphics from a central server, and visualizing large amounts of network data.

== See also ==
- List of open-source games
  - List of open-source first-person shooters
- Freedoom, a clone of Doom (1993 video game)
- Linux gaming
