= Smokin' Guns =

2012 video game

- Developer(s): Smokin' Guns Productions and Iron Claw Interactive
- Engine: ioquake3
- Platform(s): Microsoft Windows, macOS, AmigaOS 4, Linux
- Release: WW: June 8, 2012
- Genre(s): First-person shooter
- Mode(s): Single-player, multiplayer

Smokin' Guns is a 2012 first-person shooter video game. It is intended to be a semi-realistic simulation of the American Old West's atmosphere. Gameplay as well as locations are inspired by Western movies, particularly those from the Spaghetti Western genre.

Smokin' Guns's codebase is free and open-source software, distributed under the terms of the GNU General Public License. It is built upon ioquake3, an upgrade of the original Quake III engine. The artwork and other media are licensed under a proprietary non free license.

== Gameplay ==
Smokin' Guns is a semi-realistic simulation of The American Old West's atmosphere. The game is a total conversion which was developed on the Quake 3 engine. It includes weapons created with historically correct information about damage, rate of fire, reload time, etc. It includes gametypes and maps inspired mostly by movies as well as a custom soundtrack.

The game differs in many aspects from similar games which are based on Quake 3:

- It is not possible to regenerate health. Damage taken remains until a player dies and is revived.
- Weapons have to be bought with money which is given as a reward ("bounty") for defeating opponents. The amount of money depends on the rank of both players involved.
- Defeated players lose their weapons and other equipment which can be picked up by others. There are very few weapons lying around in maps.
- Money pick-ups can be found in several maps, depending on gametype.
- It is possible to dual wield two pistols. The pistols do not necessarily have to be of the same type.

=== Modes ===
The following game modes are included in the game:

- Bank Robbery: The goal of this mode is robbing the bank. One team has to attack the bank and steal the "money bag". The robber's team is equipped with two sticks of dynamite each, which allows them to blow a hole in the building and proceed to the money. After grabbing the money, they have to head back to the escape point with it to win. The second team is protecting the bank and will try to prevent the other team from getting in. While a robbery might be more difficult to pull off, it will be more profitable than defeating the defending team.
- Deathmatch and Team Deathmatch: This mode resembles classic Deathmatch gameplay. Players spawn at random areas of the level and must compete against other players in a wild west shootout. The winner is the player who defeats the most opponents in a set time or reaches a set kill count first. The levels have money and weapons that the player may pick up, and more money is awarded when the player defeats an opponent. This allows the player to purchase new and better weapons. In Team Deathmatch mode, the players are divided into two teams. The winning team is the one that defeats the most opponents in a set time limit. Levels remain the same as in the normal Deathmatch mode.
- Duel: The duel mode resembles classical western shoot-outs using only pistols. This game type is suitable for two, three, or four players, and also for two-player teams. The duel maps are huge maps divided into several parts. Separate Duels can be performed in each part of the map (up to 16 players are supported per map). The details of the duel are as follows: The combatants stand opposite each other while a musical clock starts to play. When the music stops the duel begins. The holstered pistols have to be drawn. It takes a few seconds until one can aim precisely (this will be indicated by the crosshair gradually fading in). During this time the player can decide whether to face the opponent (with poorer chances to hit) or seek cover. The winner of the duel gets money and usually stays on same part of the map to meet the next challenger.
- Round Teamplay: This mode is a cross between Bank Robbery and Deathmatch. Players are divided into two teams. A point is awarded to the team that defeats the opposing team. The winning team is the first to reach the set number of points or has the most points in a set time limit.

== Development ==
Smokin' Guns was originally developed by Iron Claw Interactive under the name Western Quake 3. From 2001 to 2003, Iron Claw Interactive released two versions (beta 1.0 and beta 2.0) as modifications respectively total conversions for Quake III Arena. Further development by Iron Claw Interactive stopped after the release of version beta 2.0 in 2003.

The development was continued by a new team in 2005 in cooperation and with the blessings of Iron Claw Interactive. The new team released two additional versions of Western Quake^{3} (beta 2.1 in 2005 and beta 2.2 in 2006). The new team, going under the name of Smokin' Guns Productions, released Smokin' Guns 1.0 as a standalone version based on the open-source Quake III engine in January 2009. The name of the game was changed in order to avoid legal problems as well as to reflect the work of the new team since it took over development in 2005.

In June 2012 the 1.1 version was released.

== Reception ==
Smokin' Guns and Western Quake 3 were mentioned in German internet gaming magazine Extreme-Players. Western Quake 3 beta 2.0 was awarded the Mod-of-the-Month Award by Mod DB. It has also received positive reviews from several other websites.

== See also ==
- List of open-source video games
- List of freeware first-person shooters
- List of video games derived from modifications
