= World of Padman =

2007 video game

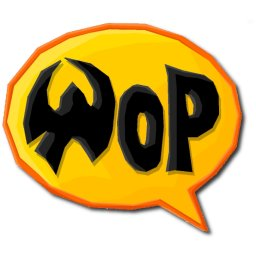
- Developer: Padworld Entertainment
- Engine: ioquake3 (GPL)
- Platforms: AmigaOS 4, Linux, Mac OS X, Windows,
- Release: April 1, 2007
- Genres: First-person shooter, Third-person shooter
- Mode: Multiplayer

World of Padman (WoP) is an open-source first-person shooter video game by German developer Padworld Entertainment available in both English and German.

== History ==
Originally it was a modification for the game Quake III Arena titled PadMod created in the year 2004. After the source code for Quake III Arena was released, the game became standalone. The idea is based on the Padman comic strip from the magazine PlayStation Games created by the professional cartoon artist Andreas 'ENTE' (German for "Duck") Endres, who also made many of the maps included with the game in 1998. The current version runs on an enhanced version of the ioquake3 engine, which is based on the Quake III Arena engine.

== Gameplay ==
World of Padman was originally a mod for Quake III Arena, so most of the gameplay is similar. World of Padman supports bots with a variety of skill levels in both online and offline play for all of the game types included. A single-player campaign has not yet been implemented however bots allow off-line multiplayer games. Players can also record audio and video as they play. The game fully supports modifications, and custom maps can be created.

In World of Padman, players die when they run out of health. Players can restore their health at a loading station or with the power-up 'revival' unlike in other games. In World of Padman there are no health items to collect.

Besides widespread game types like Tournament, Free For All and Team Deathmatch, World of Padman features three uncommon game types: Spray Your Color (spray a logo on the walls in the sprayroom), Big Balloon (similar to Unreal Tournament's Domination), Last Pad Standing, and the recently added Capture the Flag.

== Reception ==
World of Padman has been featured in printed game magazines. The German TV show GIGA broadcast an extensive WoP review. Inside Mac Games reviewed the game in June 2007.

== See also ==
- List of free first-person shooters
- List of open source games
- List of video games derived from modifications
