= The Dark Mod =

Open source stealth video game

- Release: October 17, 2009; 17 years ago (Doom 3 mod); October 8, 2013; 13 years ago (standalone game); May 27, 2018; 8 years ago (native 64-bit)
- Stable release: 2.14 / March 20, 2026; 7 months ago
- Engine: id Tech 4
- Platform: Microsoft Windows, Linux, macOS
- Type: Stealth
- License: Both GPLv3 and revised BSD license (code); various (additional software libraries); CC BY-NC-SA (assets); property of respective author (missions)
- Website: thedarkmod.com

The Dark Mod is a free and open-source software first-person stealth video game, inspired by the Thief series by Looking Glass Studios. The game provides the basic framework and tools (engine, assets, models, and editor) for more than 190 fan-made missions, including several multi-mission campaigns. The Dark Mod was founded by David Massey and first released in 2009 as a total conversion mod for Doom 3. Version 2.0 was released in October 2013 as a standalone game using the open-source id Tech 4 game engine.

== Gameplay ==
The Dark Mod takes place in a classic gothic steampunk world. This includes a crossover of elements of fantasy, the Late Middle Ages, the Victorian era and the Industrial Revolution. Although set in a very similar world to that of the original Thief series, the mod does not use any of the original Thief intellectual property.

The player is an agile thief in a hostile world. He has to use his equipment and the environment to avoid guards, traps, creatures or other threats. His equipment includes a blackjack, water arrows, holy water, flashbombs, mines, and more. Since the player has only a limited fighting capability, he is supposed to sneak and hide in dark, mostly avoiding combat. The plot and mission goals are set by the author of the fan mission or campaign.

Gameplay from 2024 map The Imperial Sword

== Development ==
The Dark Mod was originally released as a total conversion modification for Doom 3, but with the release of version 2.0 it became completely standalone on the id Tech 4 game engine.

The mod was originally developed as a toolkit. It includes models, sounds, AI, art, tools, and a specialised editor for users to create custom missions. The development of the mod started in 2004, and the first Beta was released in 2008, along with its first mission. In October 2009, v 1.0 was released. In October 2013 version 2.0 was released as a standalone game that included two missions created by the development team.

The Dark Mod 2.06 includes code from the dhewm3 fork of the id Tech 4 game engine that was ported to 64-bit, etc.

== Licenses ==
The game's source code is licensed under both the GNU General Public License 3 and the revised BSD license. Additional software libraries are released under various licenses. The missions are property of the respective authors. Many non-software components are released under the Creative Commons BY-NC-SA.

== Reception ==
The Dark Mod has been featured and reviewed by a number of major game magazines, websites and blogs. Examples include the Dutch magazine PC Game Play, the blog Kotaku, the British magazine PC Gamer, the German magazines PC Games and GameStar, as well as the British gaming website Rock, Paper, Shotgun.

After going standalone the project received additional substantial coverage from Destructoid and Joystiq.

The Dark Mod won PC Gamer UK's Game of the Year award (mod category) for 2013, and has been distributed on several magazine cover DVDs. In 2014 The Dark Mod was named by PCGamer among the "Ten top fan remade classics you can play for free right now". In 2016, The Dark Mod was ranked as #2 in "The 50 best free PC games" list by PC Gamer. The Dark Mod was also ranked in the top ten open source video games by The Gamer.

== See also ==
- List of open-source games
- List of video games derived from modifications
