= Tremulous =

Video game

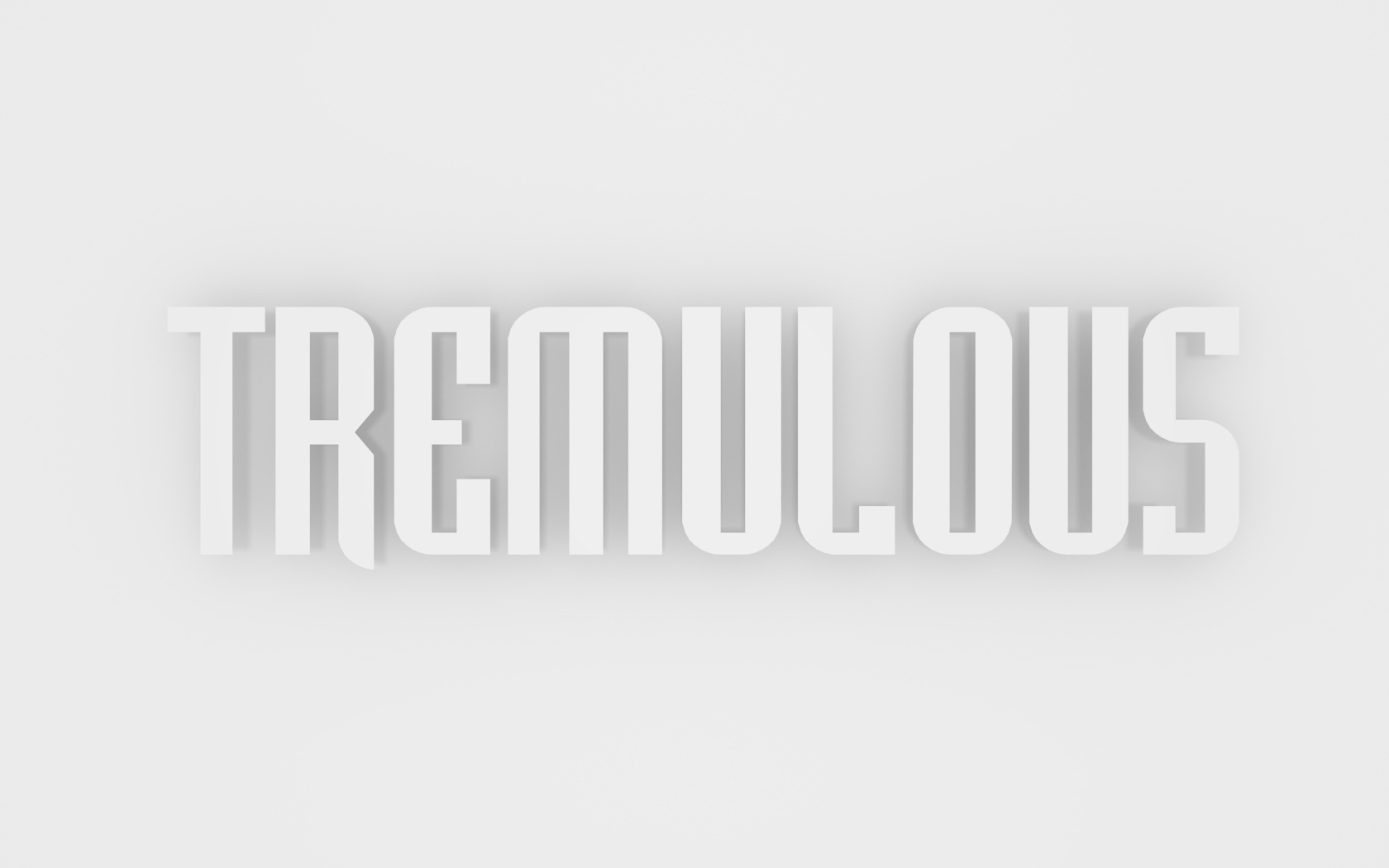
- Developer: Dark Legion Development
- Release: August 11, 2006; 20 years ago
- Stable release: 1.2 Gameplay Preview / August 8, 2011; 15 years ago
- Preview release: 1.2 Beta / June 16, 2016; 10 years ago
- Written in: C, with ioquake3 engine
- Engine: ioquake3
- Platform: Microsoft Windows, Linux, Mac OS X, FreeBSD, OpenSUSE
- Type: Multiplayer first-person shooter, real-time strategy
- License: GPL (code); CC BY-SA 2.5 (assets)
- Website: https://tremulous.net/
- Repository: github.com/darklegion/tremulous

Tremulous is a free and open source asymmetric team-based first-person shooter with real-time strategy elements. Being a cross-platform development project the game is available for Windows, Linux, and Mac OS X.

The game features two opposing teams: humans and aliens. Each team must attack the enemy's base and team members while defending their own base.

== Gameplay ==
Tremulous is an asymmetric team-based first-person shooter with elements of real time strategy. Each team may construct and defend a base, consisting of structures which aid the players in some way. Players spawn from a spawn structure.

During a match, players may attack the enemy, or maintain the base and construct new structures. Humans utilize various weapons, armor and other upgrades, while aliens may evolve into more powerful classes, each of which possesses unique abilities.

The teams do not have access to all possible upgrades and buildings at the beginning of the game. Each team must reach a threshold of frags in order to advance to the next developmental stage. The point at which a stage change occurs varies dynamically depending on the number of players on each team. Each new stage brings more upgrades for the humans and more classes for the aliens.

In addition to requiring a certain stage, each human item or alien class must be purchased using currency earned in game. The aliens are awarded frags for killing their foes which may be used to evolve (these points are commonly called evolution points or evos by players). The Humans gain credits. Players earn currency by killing enemy players or by destroying enemy spawn or power structures (Reactor and Overmind); the amount of received currency depends on what class the opponent was (or what structure was destroyed) and how much of the target's total damage was dealt by the killing player. As a mechanism to encourage builders, who naturally don't engage in combat, players are also rewarded currency every two minutes by simply staying alive.

Builders are responsible for construction of new buildings and base maintenance. Each building takes up a certain number of build points available to each team. The number of build points can vary from map to map and server to server, limiting how large bases can become. To reduce the likelihood of the match ending in a tie, most games enter a sudden death mode ten to fifteen minutes before the draw/tie time limit. This is a period during which the building of most or all structures is prohibited, allowing attackers to more easily overwhelm the defenders.

=== Aliens ===
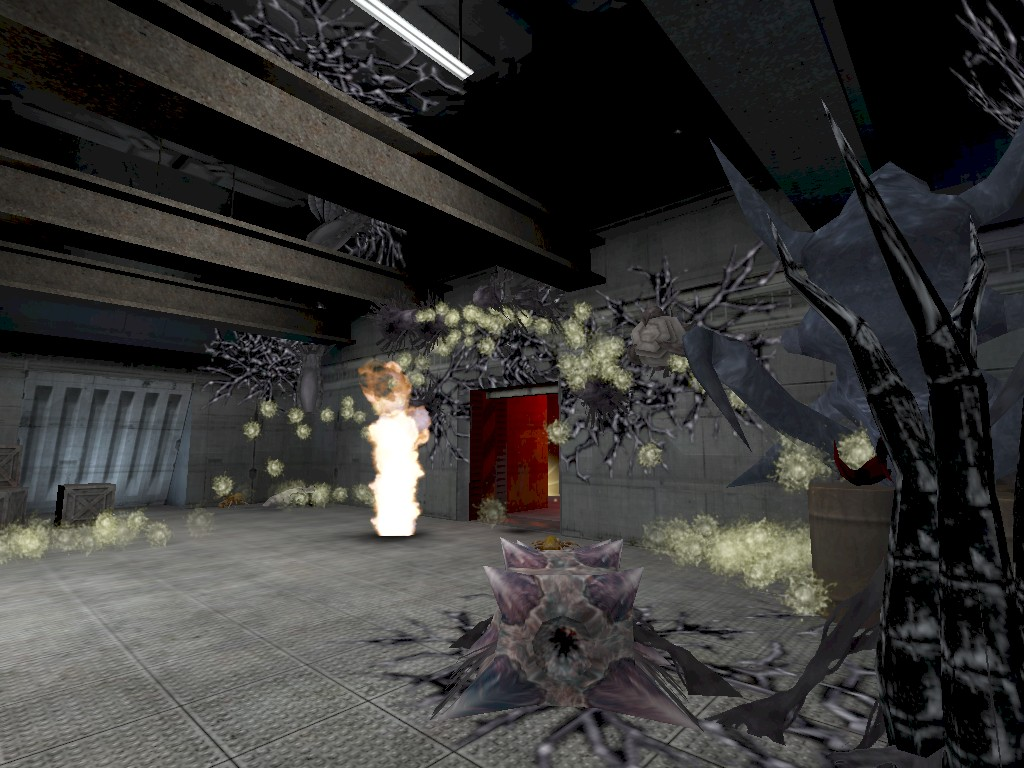
Human's grenade exploding in alien base

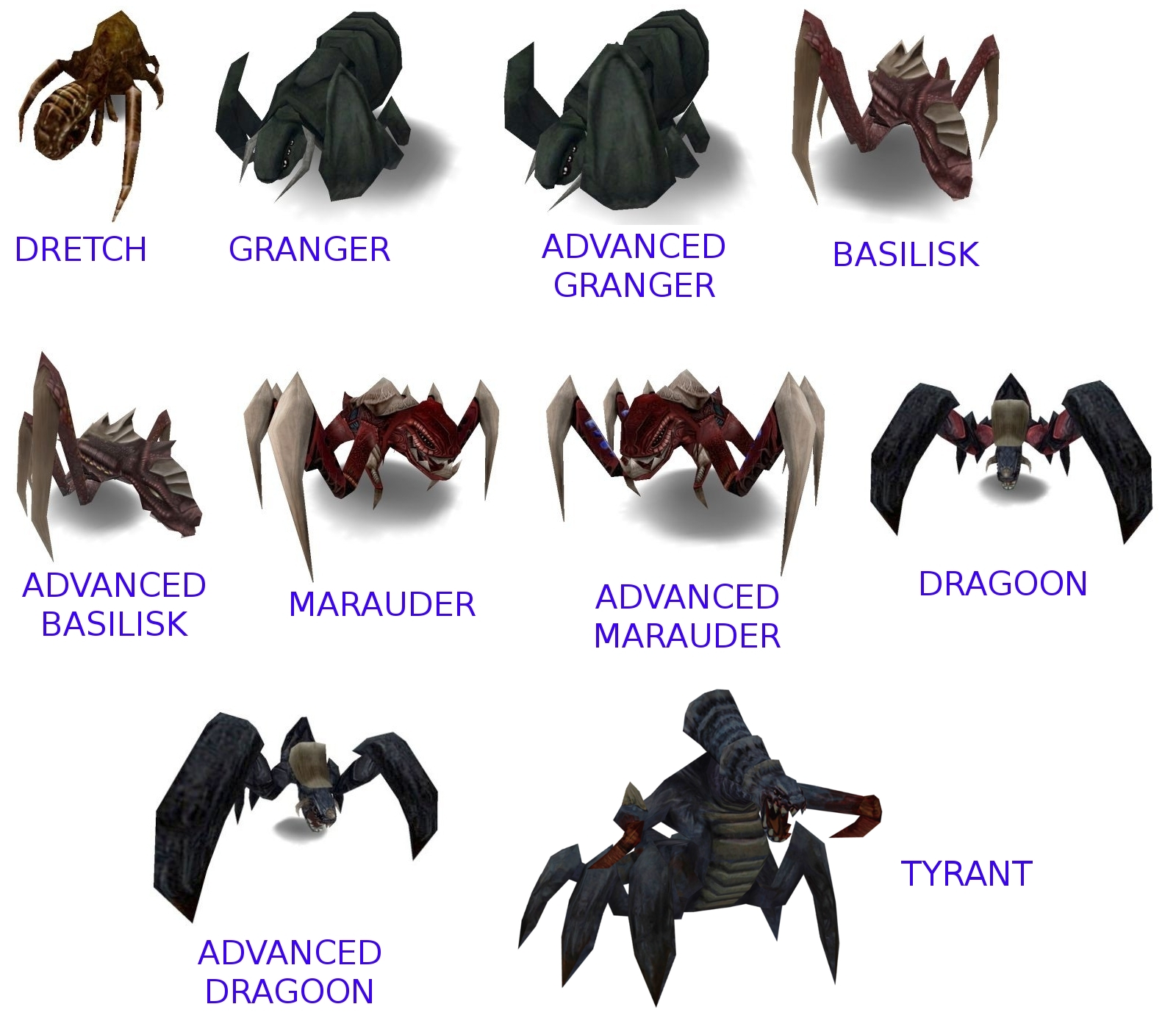
Aliens classes

The alien base is centered on a structure called the "Overmind", which is needed for their other structures to function and new structures to be built. Unlike the Human team structures, aliens may build on walls and ceilings to tactically build. Eggs provide a creep which allows nearby alien structures to live and be built, allowing for aliens to easily build offensive forward bases. Without a creep, alien structures will self destruct.

Aliens spawn from Eggs which work even when the Overmind is dead, but new eggs cannot be built without it.

As they earn frags, alien players can evolve into a new form in order to upgrade their health and gain new abilities. As the vast majority of alien attacks are melee attacks, most of these creatures depend on agility and special movement techniques such as wall-walk, wall-jump, charging and pouncing over long distances to close the distance between themselves and their enemy.

Alien players and structures automatically regenerate over time.

=== Humans ===
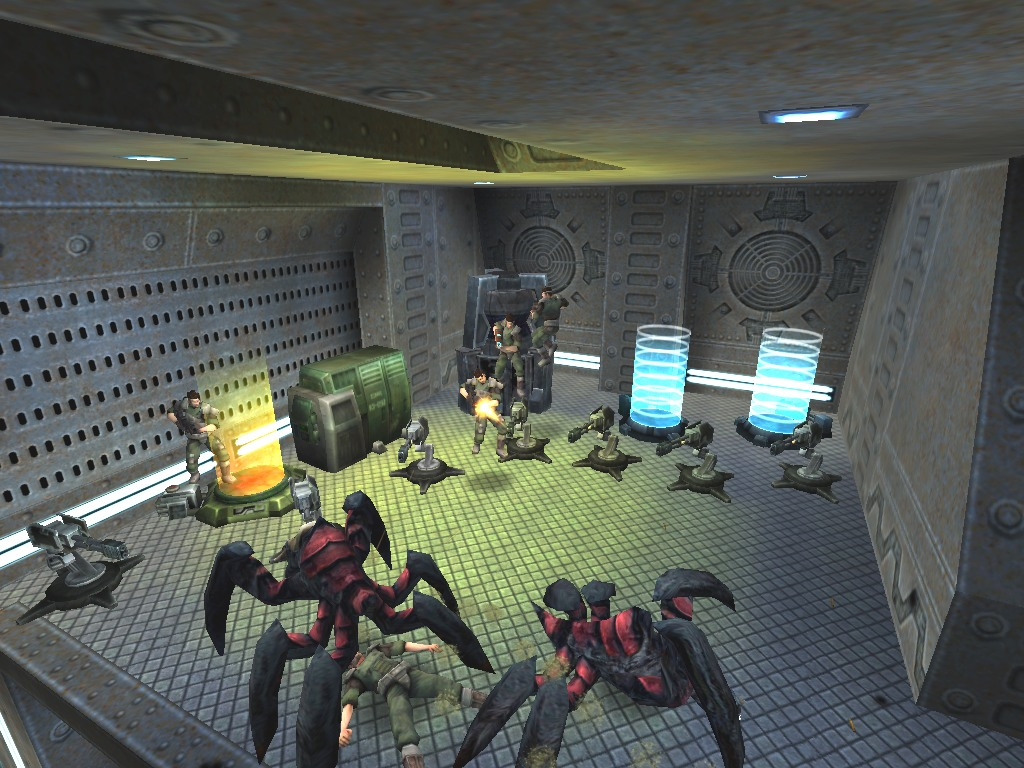
Human base attacked by dragoons early in game

Humans spawn from structures called "Telenodes", which function in much the same way as aliens' eggs.

At the core of the human base is the "Reactor", responsible for powering nearly all other base equipment. If it is destroyed, the Reactor will explode unless deconstructed (removed by a builder), often critically damaging or eliminating nearby players and structures and leaving automated defenses and upgrade structures unpowered; if it is not immediately replaced the human team is usually defeated.

Humans do not have different classes; instead they can buy and sell upgrades at a structure called the "Armory". These upgrades include armor, jet packs, and weaponry.

Human players do not automatically regenerate health over time, however they are equipped with a one-time use medkit which heals the remaining health at the time of activation over a period of time, and can be replenished at a medical station.

== Development ==
Tremulous's development by the Dark Legion group commenced in early 2000 as a modification for the commercial computer game Quake III Arena. The gameplay is generally inspired by the Quake II modification Gloom, which also features alien vs human teams with distinct user classes. Although, Tremulous shares no content with Gloom or other similar themed games from around the same time.

Another game with features similar to Tremulous was Natural Selection, but developers say it is neither based on it nor inspired by it. According to the developers, development on the game began long before Natural Selection became publicly available.

Following the release of the Quake III Arena source code under the GPL on August 19, 2005, the developers decided to rework Tremulous into a standalone, free and open source game. Tremulous is licensed under the GPL, although it includes code from other projects that was released under other GPL-compatible licenses. Most of the game media is licensed under the CC BY-SA 2.5 Creative Commons license.

Its initial standalone version 1.0.0 was released on August 11, 2005. With the stable version 1.1.0 released on March 31, 2006, the game change its game engine to ioquake3, a modified id Tech 3 engine. In 2008, Tony J. White of the ETPub mod for Wolfenstein: Enemy Territory, contributed an administrative system and a backported client that were soon incorporated into the official Subversion repository. The latest public build version on the icculus repository is 1.2 beta "Gameplay Preview" (a.k.a. GPP), released on December 4, 2009 with the latest updates released on November 8, 2011.

A Tremulous continuation from Dark Legion has its source code repository migrated to GitHub and is not under active development (last commit June 2016).

== Derivatives ==
Unvanquished is a Tremulous-based FPS with another engine (Daemon), which was first released publicly in 2012 and is under active development. It includes many original maps and is able to run Tremulous maps with some distributed in a community pack. Some Unvanquished official maps were community maps for Tremulous.

Murnatan, which is currently in development by the Czech development team, AAA Games, is the game based on a Tremulous server modification which was worked on by the same lead developer of AAA Games, but due to licensing problems, has had some changes away from its previous title Tremulous 2 and concept work, many of which was already completed. The title was approved for Steam Greenlight within 7 days.

== Reception ==
Joe Barr of NewsForge called Tremulous his favorite free software FPS game.

Tremulous was voted Player's Choice Standalone Game of the Year in Mod Database's Mod of the Year 2006 competition.

Tremulous later came in first in a "Best free game based on GPL Quake source?" poll on the Planet Quake website. At the beginning of 2007, Tremulous also took first place in the Mod Database "Mod of the Year" 2006 competition under the category of "Player's Choice Standalone Game of the Year" as well as honorable mentions in "Genre Award: Action" and "Editor's Choice Standalone Game of the Year". Tremulous was also mentioned in Games for Windows (formerly Computer Gaming World): 101 Free Games Issue for 2007. Tremulous was selected in March 2010 as "HotPick" by Linux Format.

== See also ==
- List of free first-person shooters
- id Tech 3
- List of open source games
- List of video games derived from modifications
