= Urban Terror =

2000 video game

- Developers: FrozenSand, LLC, Silicon Ice Development
- Engine: ioquake3
- Platforms: Linux, Windows, Mac OS X, AmigaOS 4
- Release: August 5, 2000 (Beta 1.0)
- Genre: First-person shooter
- Mode: Multiplayer

Urban Terror is a freeware multiplayer first-person shooter video game developed by FrozenSand. Originally a total conversion of id Software's Quake III Arena, FrozenSand released Urban Terror as a free standalone game in 2007 utilizing ioquake3 as the game engine. While the game engine is licensed under the open-source GPL, Urban Terror's game code is closed source and its assets are freeware but not open content.

== History ==
Urban Terror started out in 1998 as a planned map pack for Quake III Arena, in which real world environments would be featured. It expanded from this idea to a full total conversion featuring realistic weapons and gameplay similar to Action Quake 2. Development group Silicon Ice Development was formed in spring 2000 and was made of several international developers, many whom were familiar with modifying Quake III Engine games; hence progress was made quickly. When its first version, beta 1.0, was released at QuakeCon 2000, Urban Terror was the realism mod with the most features and graphics completed.

The development group changed its name from Silicon Ice Development to FrozenSand in 2006; version 4.0 released in January 2007 was the first to contain the FrozenSand logo.

FrozenSand began development on Urban Terror HD in 2009 and was set to release an alpha version in 2010 but soon abandoned the project and switched engines from idtech3 to Unreal Engine 4 due to licensing complications of idtech3.

On the 24th August 2016 FrozenSand was officially incorporated as the UK-based company FrozenSand Games Ltd which is the legal entity that owns the Urban Terror intellectual properties.

The most recent version, 4.3.4, was released on June 21, 2018.

The development team are currently working on version 5, a total remake of Urban Terror using the Unreal Engine 5.

== Gameplay ==
Urban Terror is billed by FrozenSand as a "Hollywood tactical shooter." It blends elements from games such as Quake III Arena, Unreal Tournament and Counter-Strike. The realism in the mod is introduced through a number of changes: The number of weapons and other gear that can be carried is limited. Damage is also more realistic than in Quake III Arena, based on dividing the player target into discrete areas.

Numerous game modes are featured, including classic first-person shooter modes such as Team Deathmatch, Capture the Flag, and Last Man Standing. Additionally, Urban Terror has a nonviolent "jump mode," in which players utilize the game's unique mechanics to progress through movement-based "jump maps" of varying difficulties.

== Mods ==
Zombie Mode is a mod of the Survivor game mode in Urban Terror. Zombie mode consists of two teams Humans and Zombies. Humans are able to carry guns and zombies are only allowed a knife. The weapons in this mod only do low damage to zombie players. It takes up to 25 rounds for a single kill. The damage from sniper rifles is the highest at 30% and the heavy machine gun, Negev, only does 1%. All other guns damage somewhere within that range. Humans in most mods are allowed to carry 3 or fewer guns. Zombies only have a knife which does 66% damage or something less in regards to where the hit lands. Zombies have a fast knife which means it becomes proximity-instant kill weapon. The round is over when the 3-minute time limit expires or all players from one team die.

== See also ==
- List of open source games
