= Glorious Mission =

2011 video game

- Cover of Glorious Mission
- Developer(s): Giant Interactive Group
- Publisher(s): Giant Interactive Group
- Engine: Unreal Engine 3
- Platform(s): Microsoft Windows
- Release: CHN: 26 June 2011 (Version 1.0); CHN: 7 December 2012 (Version 1.5)
- Genre(s): First-person shooter
- Mode(s): Single-player, multiplayer

Glorious Mission (Note: Glorious Mission is a literal translation of the original Chinese title "光荣使命". The official website uses the English subtitle Passion Leads Army, albeit unofficially.) (Chinese: 光荣使命; pinyin: Guāngróng shǐmìng) is a Chinese first-person shooter computer game. It is the first online, military-themed video game released by the People's Liberation Army (PLA).

== Development ==
Glorious Mission was developed by Giant Interactive Group, a company which develops and operates a number of popular online games in China, including the ZT Online 1 Series, ZT Online 2, Elsword and Allods Online. The game took 32 months to develop. The goal of this game is to train people in combat skills and technological awareness. A non-public, military version was also developed by China's People's Liberation Army. The main story focuses on the conflict between Japan and China over a group of islands for which sovereignty is disputed, known as the Senkaku Islands in Japan and the Diaoyu Islands in China.

The final version of the game was launched on 20 June 2011. An update that allows gameplay on the Diaoyu Islands was released on Armed Forces Day in China to coincide with the 86th anniversary of the formation of the People's Liberation Army.

== Background ==
Glorious Mission has been used to recruit potential soldiers for the People's Liberation Army as well as to train and educate current PLA combat troops. Glorious Mission accurately recreates the details of firearms, uniforms, and vehicles used by the People's Liberation Army. The game has been criticized for trivializing the reality of war by presenting it as a video game.

There are two versions of the game. The public release version supports online service and is free to play, but requires new players to register an account using their personal Resident Identity Card. The military version includes eight single-player campaigns and a multiplayer mode used by the People's Liberation Army for recreational use. The military version is also available for purchase through an activation code after a free download.

== Gameplay ==
Glorious Mission is similar to popular American first-person shooter games such as the Call of Duty series, allowing players to make their way through basic training before being deployed in a number of combat missions. The game is divided into three parts: basic training, individual soldier tasks, and squad/team confrontation. Glorious Mission levels heavily feature scripted events, such as plane flyovers and explosions. The game often forces players on a fixed path without giving them freedom to approach situations tactically. In the first level, after a brief amphibious landing, players follow a somewhat direct line through narrow trenches. In another level, after some stationary sniping, players are pushed through a narrow cave. Other levels consist of players working their way up a fenced path.

The public release version includes player versus player and Co-op modes. Co-op battles are designed to inspire patriotism in players, with missions such as "Dream to return to Shanghai" (梦回上海 meng hui shanghai) where players fight against the Imperial Japanese Army as PLA soldiers during the Battle of Shanghai, and "Protect the Diaoyu Islands" (保卫钓鱼岛 baowei Diaoyudao), which involves defending the Diaoyu Islands base from the Japan Self-Defense Forces. The JSDF appear as basic enemies in the Training Mode and Team Time Attack player versus environment modes.

== Reception ==
The game was extremely popular in China. According to government statistics, it has over 300 million online players. In its first quarter, the online game market was worth 8.5 billion Yuan ($1.31 billion U.S.). A common complaint about the game is that players need to pay in order to download the game online.

=== Controversy ===
Russian media outlets have reported that the enemies in the game most closely resemble soldiers of the United States. In response, a Chinese Ministry of Defense spokesman stated that the game's development is not directed against any particular country, and suggested that the media should refrain from excessive speculation and interpretation.

== See also ==
- America's Army, a game created by the United States Army with a similar purpose
