= Jindong, Maoming =

Jindong 金垌镇
- Town
- Location in Guangdong
- Coordinates: 22°28′22″N 110°47′19″E
- Country: People's Republic of China
- Province: Guangdong
- Prefecture-level city: Maoming
- County-level city: Xinyi
- Time zone: UTC+8 (China Standard)

Jindong (Chinese: 金垌; pinyin: Jīndòng) is a town under the administration of Xinyi, Guangdong, China. As of 2020, it administers the following two residential neighborhoods and 23 villages:

Neighborhoods

- Jindong
- Jingkou (径口)

Villages

- Jindong Village
- Shangmo Village (上磨村)
- Mala Village (马辣村)
- Shanggui Village (上贵村)
- Baihua Village (白花村)
- Siliu Village (泗流村)
- Hedong Village (合垌村)
- Liuming Village (六明村)
- Shengji Village (胜积村)
- Liusheng Village (六胜村)
- Guangrong Village (光荣村)
- Nantun Village (南屯村)
- Huanqiu Village (环球村)
- Xingfu Village (幸福村)
- Michang Village (米场村)
- Lianggeng Village (良耿村)
- Lshui Village (绿水村)
- Dalang Village (大榔村)
- Gaoche Village (高车村)
- Pingdi Village (平地村)
- Muwei Village (木威村)
- Muxin Village (木新村)
- Tianxin Village (田心村)
