= Liushan, Guangxi =

Liushan 流山镇
- Town
- Location in Guangxi
- Coordinates: 24°27′18″N 109°7′4″E
- Country: People's Republic of China
- Autonomous Region: Guangxi
- Prefecture-level city: Liuzhou
- District: Liunan District
- Time zone: UTC+8 (China Standard)

Liushan (Chinese: 流山) is a town in Liunan District, Liuzhou, in Guangxi, China. As of 2020, it administers Liushan Residential Community and the following seven villages:

- Liushan Village
- Liutang Village (流塘村)
- Dashi Village (大石村)
- Guangrong Village (广荣村)
- Zhenglan Village (正兰村)
- Xinlong Village (新隆村)
- Xin'ai Village (新艾村)

Before 2019 the town was under administration of Liujiang District.
