= Id Tech 3 =

Video game engine

id Tech 3

- Quake III, the engine's parent game
- Developer: id Software
- Final release: 1.32c / August 19, 2005; 21 years ago
- Written in: C (rewritten 14% in C++)
- Platform: Windows, Mac OS, OS X, Linux, Dreamcast, GameCube, Nintendo Switch, Nintendo Switch 2, PlayStation 2, PlayStation 3, PlayStation 4, Xbox, Xbox 360, iOS, Android
- Predecessor: Quake II engine
- Successor: id Tech 4, IW engine
- License: GNU GPL-2.0-or-later
- Website: www.idsoftware.com/business/idtech3/
- Repository: github.com/id-Software/Quake-III-Arena

Star Trek: Elite Force II is one of the last games to utilize the id Tech 3 engine.

id Tech 3, originally known as the Quake III Arena engine, is a game engine developed by id Software for its 1999 game Quake III Arena. It has subsequently been used in numerous games. Commercially, id Tech 3 competed with early versions of the Unreal Engine; both were widely licensed. Originally proprietary, it is now open-source software.

id Tech 3 is based on the earlier id Tech 2, with a large amount of the code rewritten. id Tech 4 was derived from id Tech 3, as was Infinity Ward's IW engine, used in Call of Duty 2 onward.

At QuakeCon 2005, John Carmack announced that the id Tech 3 source code would be released under the GNU General Public License v2.0 or later, and it was released on August 19, 2005. It was originally distributed via FTP, and later moved to GitHub.

== Features ==
=== Graphics ===
Unlike most other game engines released at the time—including its main competitor, the Unreal Engine—id Tech 3 requires an OpenGL-compliant graphics accelerator to run. The engine does not include a software renderer, unlike id Tech 2.

id Tech 3 introduced spline-based curved surfaces in addition to planar volumes.

The graphical technology of the game is based tightly around a shader system, where the appearance of many surfaces can be defined in text files referred to as shader scripts. Shaders are described and rendered as several layers. Each layer contains a texture, a "blend mode" that determines how to superimpose it over the previous layer, and texture orientation modes such as environment mapping, scrolling, and rotation. These features can readily be seen within the game, with many bright and active surfaces on each map and even character models. The shader system goes beyond visual appearance, defining the contents of volumes (e.g., a water volume is defined by applying a water shader to its surfaces), light emission, and which sound to play when a volume is trodden upon. To assist calculation of these shaders, id Tech 3 implements a specific fast inverse square root function, which attracted a significant amount of attention in the game development community for its clever use of integer operations.

=== Networking ===
Like id's earlier titles Doom and Quake, Quake III Arena features multiplayer support via features built into its engine. id Tech 3 uses a snapshot system to relay information about game frames to the client over UDP. The server updates object interaction at a fixed rate independent of the rate that clients update the server with their actions, then attempts to send the state of all objects at that moment (the current server frame) to each client. The server attempts to omit as much information as possible about each frame, relaying only differences from the last frame the client confirmed as received (Delta encoding). All data packets are compressed by Huffman coding with static pre-calculated frequency data to reduce bandwidth use even further.

Quake III Arena has an integrated and relatively elaborate cheat-protection system called "pure server". Any client connecting to a pure server automatically has "pure mode" enabled; while pure mode is enabled, only files within data packs can be accessed. Clients are disconnected if their data packs fail one of several integrity checks. The cgame.qvm file, with its high potential for cheat-related modification, is subject to additional integrity checks. Developers must manually deactivate pure server to test maps or mods that are not in data packs using the PK3 file format. Later versions supplemented pure server with PunkBuster support, though all the hooks to it are absent from the source code release because PunkBuster is closed source software and including support for it in the source code release would have caused any redistributors/reusers of the code to violate the GPL.

== ioquake3 ==
ioquake3
- Developer: Mr. Nuclear Monster (Jack Slater)
- Stable release: 1.36 / April 23, 2009; 17 years ago
- Preview release: GIT_801 / November 6, 2025; 11 months ago
- Written in: 97% C
- License: GNU GPL-2.0-or-later
- Website: https://ioquake3.org/
- Repository

Automatic specular and normal mapping in ioQuake3, Tremulous 1.3 prerelease client

Ioquake3 is a game engine project which aims to build upon the id Tech 3 source code release in order to remove bugs, clean up source code and to add more advanced graphical and audio features via SDL and OpenAL. ioquake3 is also intended to act as a clean base package, upon which other projects may be built. The game engine supports Ogg Vorbis format and video capture of demos in .avi format.

The project was started shortly after the source code release with the goal of creating a bug-free, enhanced open source Quake III engine source code distribution upon which new games and projects can be based. In addition, the project aims to provide an improved environment in which Quake III: Arena, the Team Arena expansion pack and all the popular mods can be played. The project added features including builtin VoIP support, Anaglyph stereo rendering (for viewing with 3D glasses), and numerous security fixes.

Ioquake3 is the basis of several game projects based on the id Tech 3 engine, such as OpenArena (mimicking Quake III Arena), Tremulous, Smokin' Guns, Urban Terror, Turtle Arena and World of Padman and game engine projects such as efport (a Star Trek: Voyager – Elite Force Holomatch clone), ioJedi Outcast, ioJedi Academy, ioDoom3, and OpenMoHAA. The engine and its associated games have been included in several Linux and BSD distributions. The cMod engine derived from the earlier Elite Force port was used to package the 20th anniversary freeware release of the game for Windows and Linux.

The source code for the Return to Castle Wolfenstein and Wolfenstein: Enemy Territory engines was released under GNU GPL-3.0-or-later on August 12, 2010. The ioquake3 developers announced the start of other engine projects.

The ioquake3 project has been used academic research such as Stanford University's Center for Computer Research in Music and Acoustics (CCRMA), Notre Dame as the foundation for VR research, and Swinburne University of Technology's Centre for Advanced Internet Architectures. Collaborative efforts from researchers at Carnegie Mellon University and the University of Toronto use ioquake3 as a platform for their published research. Students have used ioquake3 as the basis for advanced graphics work for their theses, such as Stephan Reiter's work which has been noted at the LLVM project due to his synthesis of the ioquake3 engine, ray-tracing rendering technique, and LLVM.

The project has since received forks, such as Quake3e, Spearmint, and vkQuake3.

Other derived engines include the Daemon engine used by Unvanquished, as well as competing source ports like XreaL, Kwaak3 for Android and Quake-3-Android-Port-QIII4A.

== Games ==
Year	Title	Developer	Notes
1999	Quake III Arena	id Software	
2000	Heavy Metal: F.A.K.K. 2	Ritual Entertainment	ÜberTools
2000	Star Trek: Voyager – Elite Force	Raven Software	
2000	American McGee's Alice	Rogue Entertainment	ÜberTools
2000	Quake III: Team Arena	id Software	
2001	Quake III Revolution	Bullfrog Productions	
2001	James Bond 007: Agent Under Fire	EA Redwood Shores	ÜberTools
2001	Return to Castle Wolfenstein	Gray Matter Studios (SP); Nerve Software (MP)	
2002	Medal of Honor: Allied Assault	2015	ÜberTools
2002	Star Wars Jedi Knight II: Jedi Outcast	Raven Software	
2002	Soldier of Fortune II: Double Helix	Raven Software	
2002	Medal of Honor: Allied Assault - Spearhead	EA Los Angeles	ÜberTools
2003	Wolfenstein: Enemy Territory	Splash Damage	
2003	Star Trek: Elite Force II	Ritual Entertainment	ÜberTools
2003	Medal of Honor: Allied Assault - Breakthrough	TKO Software	ÜberTools
2003	Star Wars Jedi Knight: Jedi Academy	Raven Software	
2003	Call of Duty	Infinity Ward	
2004	James Bond 007: Everything or Nothing	EA Redwood Shores	ÜberTools
2004	Call of Duty: United Offensive	Gray Matter Studios; Treyarch	
2004	Medal of Honor: Pacific Assault	EA Los Angeles	ÜberTools
2008	Iron Grip: Warlord	ISOTX	
2009	Dark Salvation	Mangled Eye Studios	
2009	Call of Duty Classic	Infinity Ward	
2010	Quake Live	id Software	
Cancelled	Severity	Escalation Studios	
Cancelled	Trinity: The Shatter Effect	Gray Matter Studios	
Cancelled	The World Is Not Enough	Electronic Arts	

== See also ==
- id Tech 2
- id Tech 4
- List of game engines
- Quake modding
