= Quake III Arena =

1999 video game

- Developer: id Software (Note: Ported to Dreamcast by Raster Productions; ported to PlayStation 2 by Bullfrog Productions; jointly developed by id Software and Pi Studios for Xbox 360.)
- Publishers: Activision: Linux Loki Entertainment; Dreamcast Sega PlayStation 2 (Revolution) Electronic Arts Xbox 360 (Arena Arcade) Bethesda Softworks
- Designers: Graeme Devine; Tim Willits; Jennell Jaquays (Note: Credited as Paul Jaquays)
- Programmers: John Carmack; Robert Duffy; Jim Dosé
- Artists: Adrian Carmack; Kevin Cloud; Kenneth Scott
- Composers: Sonic Mayhem; Front Line Assembly; Bill Leeb (Note: The Dreamcast version of the game was composed by Aubrey Hodges and Dale Stump under the pseudonym Razor.)
- Series: Quake
- Engine: id Tech 3
- Platforms: AmigaOS 4, Microsoft Windows, Linux, Mac OS, Mac OS X, Dreamcast, PlayStation 2, Xbox 360, iOS
- Release: December 2, 1999: Windows; NA: December 2, 1999; EU: December 17, 1999; WW: August 3, 2007 (digital); Windows (Team Arena); NA: December 15, 2000; EU: January 26, 2001; WW: August 3, 2007 (digital); Windows (Gold); NA: September 26, 2001; EU: August 9, 2002; Linux; NA: December 10, 1999; Mac OS; NA: January 6, 2000; Mac OS (Team Arena); NA: 2001; Mac OS (Gold); NA: October, 2001; EU: August 9, 2002; Dreamcast; NA: October 19, 2000; EU: December 8, 2000; PlayStation 2 (Revolution); NA: March 27, 2001; EU: April 6, 2001; Xbox 360 (Arena Arcade); WW: December 15, 2010
- Genre: First-person shooter
- Modes: Single-player, multiplayer

Quake III Arena is a 1999 first-person shooter game developed by id Software. The third installment of the Quake series, it focuses primarily on multiplayer gameplay, becoming one of the first modern arena shooters. While the single-player mode in previous installments were story-based, in Arena it is reduced to a player versus environment variant of the core multiplayer mode.

Notable features of Quake III Arena include a minimalist design, very extensively customizable settings such as field of view, texture detail and enemy model; and advanced movement features such as strafe-jumping and rocket-jumping. It features music composed by Sonic Mayhem and Front Line Assembly founder Bill Leeb.

The game was praised by reviewers who, for the most part, described the gameplay as fun and engaging. Many liked the crisp graphics and focus on multiplayer. Quake III Arena, often being considered one of the greatest video games ever made, has also been used extensively in professional electronic sports tournaments such as QuakeCon, Cyberathlete Professional League, DreamHack, and the Electronic Sports World Cup.

== Gameplay ==
Unlike its predecessors, Quake III Arena does not have a single-player campaign. Instead, it replicates the multiplayer experience with computer-controlled players. The game's story is brief: "the greatest warriors of all time fight for the amusement of a race called the Vadrigar in the Arena Eternal." The introduction video shows the abduction of such a warrior, Sarge, while making a last stand. Continuity with prior games in the Quake series and even Doom is maintained by the inclusion of player models and biographical information. A familiar mixture of gothic and technological map architecture as well as specific equipment is included, such as the Quad Damage power-up, the rocket launcher, and the BFG.

In Quake III Arena, the player progresses through tiers of maps, combating different bot characters that increase in difficulty, from Crash (at Tier 0) to Xaero (at Tier 7). As the game progresses, the fights take place in more complex arenas and against tougher opponents. While deathmatch maps are designed for up to 16 players, tournament maps are designed for duels between 2 players and in the single-player game could be considered 'boss battles'.

The weapons are balanced by role, with each weapon having advantages in certain situations, such as the railgun at long-range and the lightning gun at close quarters. The BFG super-weapon is an exception to this; compared to other similarly named weapons in the Doom/Quake series, Quake III Arena's incarnation of this weapon is basically a fast-firing rocket launcher and it is found in hard-to-reach locations. Weapons appear as level items, spawning at regular intervals in set locations on the map. If a player dies, all of their weapons are lost and they receive the spawn weapons for the current map, usually the gauntlet and machine gun. Players also drop the weapon they were using when killed, which other players can then pick up.

Quake III Arena comes with several gameplay modes: Free for All (FFA), a classic deathmatch, where each player competes against the rest for the highest score, Team Deathmatch (TDM), where usually two teams of four compete for the highest team frag (kill) total, Tournament (1v1), a deathmatch between two players, usually ending after a set time and Capture the Flag, which is played on symmetrical maps where teams have to recover the enemy flag from the opponents' base while retaining their own.

Quake III Arena was specifically designed for multiplayer. The game allows players whose computers are connected by a network or to the internet to play against each other in real time, and incorporates a handicap system. It employs a client–server model, requiring all players' clients to connect to a server. Quake III Arena's focus on multiplayer gameplay spawned a lively community, similar to QuakeWorld, that is still active as of 2026.

== Development ==
During early March 1999, ATI leaked the internal hardware vendor (IHV) copy of the game, which unveiled to the public in Macworld Conference & Expo at Moscone Center in January and Makuhari Messe in February by Steve Jobs (CEO of Apple Inc. at the time when it unveiled). This was a functional version of the engine with a textured level and working guns. The IHV contained most of the weapons (excepting the Gauntlet) that would make it into the final game although most were not fully modeled; a chainsaw and grappling hook were also in the IHV but did not make it into the final release. Many of the sounds that would make it into the final release were also included. The game was developed by nine people in 18 months.

After the IHV leak, id Software released a beta of the game called Quake III Arena Test on April 24, 1999, initially only for Mac OS before expanding to Windows at a later date. The Q3Test started with version 1.05 and included three levels that would be included in the final release: dm7, dm17, and q3tourney2. Id Software continued to update Q3Test up until version 1.09.

id co-founder and former technical director John Carmack has stated that Quake III Arena is his favorite game he has worked on.

Quake III Arena was shipped to retailers on December 2, 1999; the official street date for the game was December 5, although id Software chief executive officer Todd Hollenshead expected the game to be available as early as December 3 from retailers like Babbage's and EB Games. The game supported the A3D 2.0 HRTF technology by Aureal Semiconductor out of the box.

=== Game engine ===
A mirror reflects Sarge and the Quake III logo in the opening scene of the first level, Q3DM0

The id Tech 3 engine is the name given to the engine that was developed for Quake III Arena. Unlike most other games released at the time, Quake III Arena requires an OpenGL-compliant graphics accelerator to run. The game does not include a software or Direct3D renderer.

The graphic technology of the game is based tightly around a "shader" system where the appearance of many surfaces can be defined in text files referred to as "shader scripts". Quake 3 also introduced spline-based curved surfaces in addition to planar volumes, which are responsible for many of the surfaces present within the game. Quake 3 also provided support for models animated using vertex animation with attachment tags (known as the .md3 format), allowing models to maintain separate torso and leg animations and hold weapons. Quake 3 is one of the first games where the third-person model is able to look up and down and around as the head, torso and legs are separate. Other visual features include volumetric fog, mirrors, portals, decals, and wave-form vertex distortion.

For networking, id Tech 3 uses a "snapshot" system to relay information about game "frames" to the client over UDP. The server attempts to omit as much information as possible about each frame, relaying only differences from the last frame the client confirmed as received (Delta encoding). id Tech 3 uses a virtual machine to control object behavior on the server, effects and prediction on the client and the user interface. This presents many advantages as mod authors do not need to worry about crashing the entire game with bad code, clients could show more advanced effects and game menus than was possible in Quake II and the user interface for mods was entirely customizable. Unless operations which require a specific endianness are used, a QVM file will run the same on any platform supported by Quake III Arena. The engine also contains bytecode compilers for the x86 and PowerPC architectures, executing QVM instructions via an interpreter.

Quake III Arena features an advanced AI with five difficulty levels which can accommodate both a beginner and an advanced player, though they usually do not pose a challenge to high-tier or competitive players. Each bot has its own, often humorous, 'personality', expressed as scripted lines that are triggered to simulate real player chat. If the player types certain phrases, the bots may respond: for example, typing "You bore me" might cause a bot to reply "You should have been here 3 hours ago!". Each bot has a number of alternative lines to reduce the repetition of bot chatter. The Gladiator bots from Quake II were ported to Quake III Arena and incorporated into the game by their creator - Jan Paul van Waveren, aka Mr. Elusive. Bot chat lines were written by R. A. Salvatore, Seven Swords and Steve Winter. Xaero, the hardest opponent in the game, was based on the Gladiator bot Zero. The bot Hunter appears on magazine covers in the later id game Doom 3.

On August 19, 2005, id Software released the complete source code for Quake III Arena under the GNU General Public License v2.0 or later, as they have for most of their prior engines. As before, the engine, but not the content such as textures and models, was released, so that anyone who wishes to build the game from source will still need an original copy of the game to play it as intended.

=== Fast inverse square root ===
Fast inverse square root, sometimes referred to as Fast InvSqrt() or by the hexadecimal constant 0x5F3759DF, is an algorithm that estimates $\frac{1}{\sqrt{x}}$, the reciprocal (or multiplicative inverse) of the square root of a 32-bit floating-point number $x$ in IEEE 754 floating-point format. The algorithm is best known for its implementation in the source code of Quake III Arena.

At the time, it was generally computationally expensive to compute the reciprocal of a floating-point number, especially on a large scale. However, the fast inverse square root bypassed this step.

Around 2002, initial speculation pointed to John Carmack as the probable author of the code, but he demurred and suggested it was written by Terje Mathisen, an accomplished assembly programmer who had previously helped id Software with Quake optimization. Mathisen had written an implementation of a similar bit of code in the late 1990s, but the original authors proved to be much further back in the history of 3D computer graphics with Gary Tarolli's implementation for the SGI Indigo as a possible earliest known use.

=== Source ports ===
Quake III Arena has been unofficially ported to several consoles, including the PlayStation Portable handheld and Xbox console. These versions require a modified console or handheld and the assets to the original game to go along with the source port.

Carmack has said that Quake Trilogy (including Arena) will be ported on the iPhone/iPod Touch/iPad. An unofficial version for iOS was released through Cydia for jailbroken iOS devices in April 2008; it is a demo version similar to the original except that it integrates the iPhone and iPod Touch's accelerometer and touch controls to make gameplay possible. A high-definition version for iPad was released in November 2010, featuring re-created controls, sharper graphics, better gameplay, and better framerate; this improved version was also integrated into the iPhone and iPod touch version of the port.

A Moorestown prototype version was demonstrated on a reference design that demonstrated performance of up to 90 frames per second. An unofficial port of Quake III for Symbian mobile devices was made. It requires PAK files from original game to run. An unofficial port of the game to Android was created based on the released source code. This means the game can be run on several Android powered devices, most notably the Motorola Milestone, Motorola Droid, and the Nexus One, as well as other high-end devices.

In August 2011, the ARM-based Raspberry Pi credit card-sized computer was shown running a specially-compiled ARM version of Quake III on Debian.

In February 2019, an unofficial port of Quake III called ioQuake3DS was released for the Nintendo 3DS by masterfeizz. The console must be homebrewed in order to be run.

In May 2022, an unofficial VR port was released for Meta Quest and Pico virtual reality headsets by a group of modders around Team Beef. To run the port, players must use sideloading. The port is based on the IoQuake3 source port.

== Release ==
As a result of the disappointing sales of Blue Stinger, Activision was discouraged from publishing further titles for the Dreamcast and relinquished the distribution of the Dreamcast version of Quake III Arena (ported by Raster Productions) to Sega. First announced on January 29, 2000. and released on October 23, 2000, the Dreamcast version of Quake III featured 4 player cross-platform play between Dreamcast and PC players. It is often considered one of the best PC-to-console ports of its time thanks to its smooth frame rate and online play. There are still communities that play this version online on the remaining dedicated servers running patch version 1.16n and the required map pack. The Dreamcast version of Quake III also included VMU Maze mini-games.

Quake III Revolution (ported by Bullfrog Productions, published by Electronic Arts in North America and Electronic Arts Square in Japan) was released for the PlayStation 2 in March 2001, featuring several elements adopted from Team Arena, along with a more mission-based single-player mode. It features split-screen multiplayer for up to 4 players with the PS2 Multitap. As the game was an early PS2 title, it lacked online play - Sony would not launch their network functionality in North America until August 2002. GameRankings rated the release at 83%. Quake III Revolution was widely criticized for having long loading times compared to the Dreamcast and PC versions, poor game balance, and for not including USB mouse and keyboard support out of the box (unlike the PlayStation 2's version of Unreal Tournament).

Quake Arena Arcade for the Xbox 360 was officially announced by id at QuakeCon 2007. The title, jointly developed by id and Pi Studios, was released on Xbox Live Arcade on December 15, 2010. The retail price of the game was set at 1200 Microsoft Points, or $15 USD. Quake Arena DS for the Nintendo DS was announced at QuakeCon on August 4, 2007. John Carmack stated touch screen controls would not be implemented, as he preferred the game be played with the D-pad instead. This version was silently cancelled. Quake Zero was announced at QuakeCon on August 3, 2007, and was an updated version of Quake 3 Arena, distributed by free download, run in a browser window and supported by built-in advertising content. Quake Zero was launched as Quake Live, released in 2010.

On November 15, 2021, Microsoft made the x86-64-based Xbox One/Series X/S consoles backward compatible with Quake Arena Arcade, one of 76 titles published in celebration of the 20th anniversary of the original Xbox console's launch.

== Additional content ==
=== Official expansion ===
An expansion pack titled Quake III: Team Arena was released on December 15, 2000, in North America, January 15, 2001, in Japan and January 26, in Europe. It was developed by id Software and published by Activision. The expansion focused on team-based gameplay through new game modes, as well as the addition of three new weapons (the Chaingun, Nailgun, and Prox Launcher), and new items and player models. Quake III: Team Arena was criticized, as its additions were long overdue and had already been implemented by fan modifications. Quake III: Gold was later released on September 26, 2001, in North America, March 29, 2002, in Japan and August 9 in Europe. Quake III: Gold included the full version of Quake III Arena and the Quake III: Team Arena expansion pack bundled together in a Hybrid Disc CD-ROM. Canadian electro-industrial band Front Line Assembly made the soundtrack for the expansion, the counterpart to Sonic Mayhem's Quake III Arena: Noize.

=== Mods ===
Like its predecessors, Quake and Quake II, Quake III Arena can be heavily modified, allowing the engine to be used for many different games. Mods range from small gameplay adjustments like Rocket Arena 3 and Orange Smoothie Productions to total conversions such as Smokin' Guns, DeFRaG, and Loki's Revenge. The source code's release has allowed total conversion mods such as Tremulous, World of Padman, OpenArena, and Urban Terror to evolve into free standalone games. Other mods like Weapons Factory Arena have moved to more modern commercial engines. Challenge ProMode Arena became the primary competitive mod for Quake III Arena since the Cyberathlete Professional League announced CPMA as its basis for competition. CPMA includes alternative gameplays, including air-control, rebalanced weapons, instant weapon switching, and additional jumping techniques. Another mod that underwent several open beta versions and was very popular in 1999–2001 was Quake 3 Fortress (Q3F). The initial version of this game was an indirect port of the Quakeworld Team Fortress mod with many clans and leagues competing in both games simultaneously. Q3F was eventually ported to another Quake 3 mod Enemy Territory Fortress which had limited success. The developers of Q3F eventually abandoned the mod but used it to create the standalone 2003 game Wolfenstein: Enemy Territory, which uses the Quake III engine and is still popular with approximately 9,400 active players in 2018.

== Reception ==
=== Critical reception ===
Reception

Aggregate scores
Aggregator	Score			
Aggregator	Dreamcast	PC	PS2	Xbox 360
GameRankings	92%	84%	84%	N/A
Metacritic	93/100	N/A	84/100	69/100

Review scores
Publication	Score			
Publication	Dreamcast	PC	PS2	Xbox 360
Electronic Gaming Monthly	8.83/10	N/A	6.5/10	N/A
Eurogamer	9/10	9/10	N/A	7/10
Famitsu	N/A	N/A	25/40	N/A
Game Informer	9.25/10	N/A	7.75/10	N/A
GameFan	97/100	89/100	N/A	N/A
GamePro	4.75/5	N/A	4.25/5	N/A
GameRevolution	A−	N/A	N/A	N/A
GamesMaster	N/A	95%	90%	N/A
GameSpot	9.4/10	9.2/10	7.7/10	N/A
GameSpy	N/A	N/A	7.7/10	N/A
GamesRadar+	N/A	92%	69%	3.5/5
IGN	9.2/10	9.3/10	8.8/10	7/10
Maximum PC	N/A	8/10	N/A	N/A
Next Generation	4/5	5/5	4/5	N/A
Official U.S. PlayStation Magazine	N/A	N/A	4.5/5	N/A
Official Xbox Magazine (UK)	N/A	N/A	N/A	8/10
PC Accelerator	N/A	8/10	N/A	N/A
PC Gamer (UK)	N/A	95%	N/A	N/A
PC Gamer (US)	N/A	80%	N/A	N/A
PC PowerPlay	N/A	93/100	N/A	N/A
PC Zone	N/A	89/100	N/A	N/A
X-Play	N/A	N/A	4/5	N/A
Entertainment Weekly	N/A	A−	N/A	N/A
Gaming Age	N/A	A−	N/A	N/A
The Cincinnati Enquirer	5/5	N/A	N/A	N/A
PSMK2network	N/A	N/A	62/100	N/A
The A.V. Club	N/A	N/A	N/A	B
Metro GameCentral	N/A	N/A	N/A	7/10

"If you're looking to buy Quake III Arena for an awesome single-player experience, this game isn't for you. If you're yearning for silky-smooth online deathmatches, and crave to push your top-of-the-line PC to the threshold of its performance, then perhaps Quake III Arena is the only game you'll ever need…".

— Robert Howarth of Diehard GameFan in 1999

Metacritic, which assigns a normalised rating in the 0–100 range, calculated an average score of 93 out of 100 ("Universal acclaim/Must-Play") for the Dreamcast version, 84 out of 100 ("Generally favorable reviews") for the PlayStation 2 version's Revolution edition. while the Xbox Live Arcade version's Arena Arcade edition received a lowest score with the average score of 69 out of 100 ("Mixed or Average").

Reviews for the game were very positive, with many describing the game as fast and addictive. Curved surfaces were a welcome addition to the series. Most reviewers felt the game was best when played with others online. A Diehard GameFan review by Robert Howarth described the game as the best "pure deathmatch" experience around, but criticised the game's frame rate, which didn't run very well on low-end systems and required either a RIVA TNT2 or GeForce 256 GPU to run the game at an acceptable frame rate. GameSpot reviewer Jeff Gerstmann described the game as outstanding. He noted the fun level designs, great-looking textures, impressive special effects and weapons sounds. Gerstmann however criticised the narrator's voice and thought that some levels could become too crowded when playing multiplayer. An IGN review felt the game lacked originality but enjoyed the detailed wall textures and outer space jump levels. The high number of character skins and the AI of opponent bots were praised but the weapons were said to be "bland and predictable". A Eurogamer review described the game as "polished" and "stunning" and thought that it "was extremely well balanced and plays very well". The reviewer was especially pleased with the customisable 3D engine and looked forward to new maps and mods.

Blake Fischer reviewed the PC version of the game for Next Generation, rating it five stars out of five, describing it as "the best deathmatch yet. Period. End of story. If you want single-player or a storyline, buy Half-Life. If you want great DM and near-infinite expandability, Quake III is the best in the business".

Frank O'Connor reviewed the Dreamcast version of the game for Next Generation, rating it four stars out of five, and stated that it was "a brilliant, if flawed, conversion of arguably the best online game ever made – it's sure a hell of a lot more interesting use of the Dreamcast modem than Chu Chu Rocket". The Dreamcast version won GameSpot's annual "Best Multiplayer Game" award among console games, and was a runner-up in the "Best Shooting Game" category, which went to Perfect Dark.

""Quake III: Revolution" proves that the PS2 can certainly do great first-person action, and while the single-player game gets monotonous after a while, the split-screen multiplayer action makes this a must-have for fans of group gaming. Great graphics, intelligent control, and fast-paced gameplay add up to a topnotch piece of action and one of the best games on the system".

— Jason D'Aprile of X-Play in 2001

Garrett Kenyon reviewed the PlayStation 2 version of the game for Next Generation, rating it four stars out of five, and stated that "all in all, this is a fast and beautiful game – easily the best shooter available for PS2". Japanese gaming magazine Shūkan Famicom Tsūshin scored the PlayStation 2 version of the game a 25 out of 40 (63 out of 100 for online version), while a User Reviewer average scored at the MK2network website are scored 62 out of 100. The PlayStation 2 version was a nominee for The Electric Playground's 2001 Blister Awards for "Best Console Shooter Game", but lost to Halo: Combat Evolved for Xbox.

Quake III Arena won PC Gamer US's 1999 "Special Achievement in Graphics" award, and wrote that it "set a new high-water mark in 3D graphics this year". During the 3rd Annual Interactive Achievement Awards, the game was nominated for "Computer Action Game of the Year", which was ultimately awarded to Half-Life: Opposing Force. (Note: The Opposing Force multiplayer mode was later bundled in Half-Life: Counter-Strike (which won the Online Game of the Year from Golden Joystick Awards in 2002).)

In January 2016, Red Bull labeled Q3DM17 (The Longest Yard) one of the 10 greatest FPS multiplayer levels of all time.

=== Sales ===
Quake III's sales surpassed 50,000 copies during its first three days of release, by which time 1 million copies had been printed. It debuted at #5 on PC Data's weekly computer game sales chart for the December 5–11 period. The game rose to fourth place in the weekly top 10 the following week. Domestically, it sold 222,840 copies and earned revenues of $10.1 million (~$17.9 million in 2025) by early 2000.

In North America, Quake III sold 168,309 copies and earned $7.65 million (~$13.6 million in 2025) from January through October 2000, according to PC Data. Its overall sales in the region, including its launch in 1999, totaled 319,970 units by November 2000. Its sales for 2000 alone ultimately reached 190,950 units and $8.4 million (~$14.9 million in 2025) by the end of the year. The game later received a "Silver" sales award from the Entertainment and Leisure Software Publishers Association (ELSPA), indicating sales of at least 100,000 copies in the United Kingdom.

=== Competitive play ===
Quake III Arena's multiplayer-focused development led to it developing a large community of competitive players and like its predecessors it was used extensively in professional electronic sports tournaments. In competitive Quake III Arena there are two distinct gameplays, often referred to as 'rulesets', the out-of-the-box Quake III Arena game, also known as vanilla Quake 3 (VQ3), and the CPM ruleset of the Challenge Pro Mode Arena mod. On July 26, 2006, Challenge Pro Mode Arena with VQ3 gameplay was chosen by Cyberathlete Professional League as the mod of choice for their tournament, making it the standard competitive mod for Quake III Arena. Previously, Orange Smoothie Productions was the most widely used tournament mod.

The following competitions have held Quake III events:

- Cyberathlete Amateur League
- Cyberathlete Professional League
- Electronic Sports World Cup
- QuakeCon
- World Cyber Games
- Dreamhack

These competitions have now moved on to more recent games or have transitioned to its variant successor, Quake Live.

== See also ==
- 1999 in video games
- OpenArena – a video game clone of Quake III Arena
