= List of 3D Realms games =

Video games by developer/publisher

3D Realms is an American video game publisher and developer originally based in Garland, Texas and currently based in Aalborg, Denmark. It was founded in 1987 as Apogee Software by Scott Miller to publish his game Kingdom of Kroz. Prior to Apogee's founding, Miller had released a few games he had developed himself, as well as a couple "packs" of games developed by himself and others, under a shareware distribution model whereby the games were distributed for free in return for donations. These games were inconsistently marketed under the name Apogee Software Productions, though after the company was founded they were sold under the Apogee Software name. Miller found that the standard shareware model was not viable for his games such as Beyond the Titanic (1986) and Supernova (1987), and beginning with Kroz the company pioneered the "Apogee model" of shareware distribution, wherein games were broken up into segments with the first part released for free to drive interest in the other monetized portions.

Soon after its founding, Apogee began publishing titles by other developers in addition to titles by Miller; these developers were often companies composed of a single designer. As Apogee expanded to include more people, some of these designers, such as George Broussard (Micro F/X Software) and Todd Replogle (Scenario Software), joined Apogee as employees and designed its later titles; Broussard joined the company in 1991 as a co-owner. In the 1990s, Apogee was best known for popularizing its shareware model and as the creator of franchises for MS-DOS on the personal computer such as Duke Nukem and as the publisher of games such as Commander Keen and Wolfenstein 3D.

In 1994, Apogee decided to launch different brand names for each genre of games they published; it created 3D Realms for 3D games, publishing Terminal Velocity in 1995 and developing the 1996 Duke Nukem 3D under the name, with the other titles released in those years still under Apogee. In late 1996, however, Apogee renamed the company itself to 3D Realms to associate their brand with newer, 3D titles. 3D Realms launched a brand for pinball games, Pinball Wizards, in February 1997, but only published Balls of Steel (1997) under the name. Also beginning in 1997, with their licensed Duke Nukem sequels, 3D Realms shifted from episodic MS-DOS titles to non-episodic console and personal computer games. In the process it abandoned the shareware model in favor of a traditional publishing model; it also largely ceased its activities as a developer that same year, releasing only Shadow Warrior (1997). The sole exceptions were Prey (2006), which stayed in development until 2001 when it was transferred to another studio, and Duke Nukem Forever (2011), which famously stayed in development at 3D Realms as vaporware until 2009.

In July 2008, 3D Realms licensed the Apogee name to the newly formed Apogee Software, which publishes both older Apogee titles and new games; it was renamed Apogee Entertainment in 2021. In 2009, financial issues drove 3D Realms to shut down their development department and publishing operations, canceling Duke Nukem Forever and its publishing involvement in the already announced Earth No More and Prey 2. In 2014, 3D Realms itself, then focusing on licensing its franchises to other developers, was sold to the investment firm backing Interceptor Entertainment, one of those developers; since then it has published two titles for Interceptor and has several more planned under its new name of Slipgate Ironworks. In 2017, 3D Realms announced a return to development with a partnership for Shadow Stalkers, expected in 2018 but later canceled. 3D Realms has since published several titles by multiple developers, particularly Slipgate Ironworks. During its history, 3D Realms has developed or published over 50 games, and granted licenses for 10 more. At least 25 games that 3D Realms was involved with were canceled, with some going on to be finished by other companies.

== Video games ==
Many of the games published under the Apogee name were released as a set of separate episodes, which were purchasable and playable separately or as a group. Titles are listed for games that gave individual names to their episodes instead of episode numbers.

List of games
Title	System(s)	Release date	Developer(s)	Ref(s)
Puzzle Fun-Pak (Asteroids Rescue, Block Five, Maze Machine, Phrase Master) (Note: Asteroids Rescue has also been published as Meteors.)	MS-DOS	1986	Apogee	
Adventure Fun-Pak (Night Bomber, Raiders of the Forbidden Mine, Rogue Runner, The Thing) (Note: Raiders of the Forbidden Mine has also been published as Raiders of the Lost Mine, Diamond Digger and Gold Miner; Rogue Runner has also been published as Maze Runner.)	MS-DOS	1986	Apogee	
Beyond the Titanic	MS-DOS	1986	Apogee (Scott Miller)	
Supernova	MS-DOS	1987	Apogee (Scott Miller, Terry Nagy)	
The Kroz Trilogy ("Kingdom of Kroz", "Caverns of Kroz", "Dungeons of Kroz") (Note: "Caverns of Kroz" and "Dungeons of Kroz" were initially developed by Miller prior to the founding of Apogee and published through the I.B.Magazette disk magazine as "Kroz" and "Kroz II"; when "Kingdom of Kroz" was released (through Apogee and others such as Softdisk) they were renamed and republished by Apogee. All three titles were updated and republished in 1990 and 1991 in a new order as "Caverns of Kroz II", "Dungeons of Kroz II", and "Kingdom of Kroz II".)	MS-DOS	November 26, 1987	Apogee (Scott Miller)	
Word Whiz	MS-DOS	1988	Apogee (Scott Miller)	
Trivia Whiz	MS-DOS	1988	Micro F/X Software (George Broussard)	
Trek Trivia	MS-DOS	1988	Apogee (Scott Miller)	
Next Generation Trivia	MS-DOS	1988	Micro F/X Software (George Broussard)	
The Thor Trilogy ("Caves of Thor", "Realm of Thor", "Thor's Revenge")	MS-DOS	1989	Scenario Software (Todd Replogle)	
The Lost Adventures of Kroz	MS-DOS	1990	Apogee (Scott Miller)	
Monuments of Mars ("First Contact", "The Pyramid", "The Fortress", "The Face")	MS-DOS (Note: In 2014, 3D Realms digitally republished several of its DOS titles for Windows and macOS.)	January 1, 1990	Scenario Software (Todd Replogle)	
The Super Kroz Trilogy ("Return to Kroz", "Temple of Kroz", "The Final Crusade of Kroz") (Note: Like the original Kroz trilogy of episodes, the Super Kroz Trilogy episodes were released under multiple names: "Return to Kroz" was titled "Shrine of Kroz" and "Castle of Kroz" in different publications before Miller settled on a name, and "Temple of Kroz" was also titled "Valley of Kroz".)	MS-DOS	June 1990	Apogee (Scott Miller)	
Pharaoh's Tomb ("Raiders of the Lost Tomb", "Pharaoh's Curse", "Temple of Terror", "Nevada's Revenge")	MS-DOS	December 14, 1990	Micro F/X Software (George Broussard)	
Commander Keen in Invasion of the Vorticons ("Marooned on Mars", "The Earth Explodes", "Keen Must Die!")	MS-DOS (Note: Commander Keen in Invasion of the Vorticons and Commander Keen in Goodbye Galaxy were also released by id Software for Microsoft Windows in 2007.)	December 14, 1990	id Software	
Dark Ages ("Prince of Destiny", "The Undead Kingdom", "Dungeons of Doom")	MS-DOS	January 1991	Scenario Software	
Jumpman Lives!	MS-DOS	June 10, 1991	Shamusoft Designs (Dave Sharpless)	
Duke Nukem ("Shrapnel City", "Mission: Moonbase", "Trapped in the Future")	MS-DOS (Note: A port of Duke Nukem was developed and published by Interceptor Entertainment for Microsoft Windows and macOS in 2013.)	July 1, 1991	Apogee	
Paganitzu ("Romancing the Rose", "The Silver Dagger", "Jewel of the Yucatan")	MS-DOS	October 1, 1991	Trilobyte (Keith Schuler)	
Arctic Adventure	MS-DOS	October 9, 1991	Apogee	
Crystal Caves ("Troubles with Twibbles", "Slugging it Out", "Mylo Versus the Supernova")	MS-DOS	October 23, 1991	Apogee	
Commander Keen in Goodbye, Galaxy! ("Secret of the Oracle", "The Armageddon Machine")	MS-DOS	December 15, 1991	id Software	
Secret Agent ("The Hunt for Red Rock Rover", "Kill Again Island", "Dr. No Body")	MS-DOS	February 1, 1992	Apogee	
Cosmo's Cosmic Adventure	MS-DOS	March 1992	Apogee	
Word Rescue ("Visit Gruzzleville and the Castle", "Explore GruzzleBad Caverns", "See the Spooky Haunted House")	MS-DOS	March 1992	Redwood Games	
Wolfenstein 3D ("Escape from Castle Wolfenstein", "Operation: Eisenfaust", "Die, Führer, Die!")	MS-DOS (Note: Wolfenstein 3D was also released by id Software through various publishers other than Apogee/3D Realms for the Super Nintendo Entertainment System (1994), Atari Jaguar (1994), Mac OS (1994), Acorn Archimedes (1994), 3DO (1995), PC-98 (1998), Game Boy Advance (2002), Xbox Live Arcade (2009), PlayStation Network (2009), and iOS (2009).)	May 5, 1992	id Software	
Math Rescue ("Visit Volcanoes and Ice Caves", "Follow the Gruzzles into Space", "See Candy Land")	MS-DOS	October 1992	Redwood Games	
ScubaVenture: The Search for Pirate's Treasure	MS-DOS	1993	Apogee (Note: ScubaVenture was developed by Apogee on contract for Softdisk in 1991, and was marketed as a Softdisk game; Apogee developed the title on behalf of id Software in order to let them focus on developing Wolfenstein 3D (1992).)	
Major Stryker ("Lava Planet", "Arctic Planet", "Desert Planet")	MS-DOS	January 15, 1993	Apogee	
Monster Bash	MS-DOS	April 9, 1993	Apogee	
Bio Menace ("Dr. Mangle's Lab", "The Hidden Lab", "Master Cain")	MS-DOS	August 3, 1993	Apogee	
Alien Carnage ("Sewers", "Factory", "Office Block", "Alien Ship") (Note: Alien Carnage was initially released as Halloween Harry; in November 1994 it was renamed, with the "Sewers" and "Office Block" episodes switching places to make "Sewers" the first episode.)	MS-DOS	October 10, 1993	Interactive Binary Illusions, SubZero Software	
Duke Nukem II	MS-DOS (Note: A port of Duke Nukem II was developed by Torus Games and published by GT Interactive as Duke Nukem on the Game Boy Color in 1999, and Interceptor Entertainment developed and published ports for iOS, Microsoft Windows, and macOS in 2013.)	December 3, 1993	Apogee	
Blake Stone: Aliens of Gold ("Star Institute", "Floating Fortress", "Underground Network", "Star Port", "Habitat 11", "Satellite Defense")	MS-DOS	December 3, 1993	JAM Productions	
Raptor: Call of the Shadows ("Bravo Sector", "Tango Sector", "Outer Regions")	MS-DOS (Note: Cygnus Studios (then Mountain King Studios) released a version of Raptor: Call of the Shadows for Microsoft Windows in 1999. An iOS port was developed and published by BlitWise Productions in 2010, while a macOS port was developed and published by DotEmu in 2011.)	April 1, 1994	Cygnus Studios	
Hocus Pocus ("Time Tripping", "Shattered Worlds", "Warped and Weary", "Destination Home")	MS-DOS	June 1, 1994	Moonlite Software	
Mystic Towers ("Rimm", "Tor Korad", "Nortscar", "Wolf's Den", "Ebonscarp", "Marchwall")	MS-DOS	July 15, 1994	Animation F/X	
Wacky Wheels	MS-DOS	October 17, 1994	Beavis Soft	
Blake Stone: Planet Strike	MS-DOS	October 28, 1994	JAM Productions	
Boppin' ("Bothersome Hunnybunz", "Significant Other of Hunnybunz", "Love Child of Hunnybunz", "Hunnybunz Defrocked")	MS-DOS (Note: Boppin' was originally published by Karmasoft for the Amiga computer in 1991; the MS-DOS version published by Apogee was an expanded version. Accursed Toys released a Microsoft Windows version for free in 2005.)	November 15, 1994	Accursed Toys	
Rise of the Triad ("Approach", "Monastery", "Caves Below", "The Slow and the Dead")	MS-DOS (Note: Rise of the Triad was released as Rise of the Triad: Dark War by 3D Realms for Microsoft Windows, macOS, and Linux in 2009, and for iOS in 2010.)	December 21, 1994	Apogee	
Terminal Velocity	MS-DOS, Windows (Note: Terminal Velocity was published for macOS by MacSoft in 1995, and for Android and iOS by Trebuchet Entertainment in 2015.)	May 1, 1995	Terminal Reality	
Realms of Chaos ("Revolt of the Myraal", "The Goblin Plague", "Foray into Fire")	MS-DOS	November 11, 1995	Apogee	
Xenophage: Alien Bloodsport	MS-DOS	December 29, 1995	Argo Games	
Duke Nukem 3D ("L.A. Meltdown", "Lunar Apocalypse", "Shrapnel City")	MS-DOS (Note: Duke Nukem 3D has been ported by a variety of developers and publishers to the Game.com (1997), Mac OS (1997), Sega Saturn (1997), PlayStation (as Duke Nukem: Total Meltdown, 1997), Nintendo 64 (as Duke Nukem 64, 1997), Sega Genesis (1998), Xbox 360 (2008), iOS (2009), and Android (2011). An updated version of the game titled Duke Nukem 3D: Atomic Edition was developed and published by 3D Realms in 1996; it added a fourth episode, "The Birth", and the "Plutonium Pack" upgrade was also released to upgrade existing MS-DOS copies. Numerous other expansions and level packs were developed by various creators and released in various venues since the game's release; these were collected along with the Atomic version of the game as Duke Nukem 3D: Megaton Edition for Microsoft Windows (2013), Linux (2013), PlayStation 3 (2015), and PlayStation Vita (2015). The most recent release Duke Nukem 3D: 20th Anniversary World Tour for PlayStation 4 (2016) and Xbox One (2016), consisted of the levels from the Atomic Edition as well as a new fifth episode, "Alien World Order".)	January 29, 1996	3D Realms (Note: Duke Nukem 3D and Shadow Warrior were published by GT Interactive instead of by 3D Realms.)	
Death Rally	MS-DOS (Note: A port of Death Rally was created by Jari Komppa and released by Remedy Entertainment in 2009. A remake of the game was developed by Mountain Sheep and published by Remedy Entertainment for iOS and Android in 2011.)	September 6, 1996	Remedy Entertainment	
Stargunner ("Scout Mission", "Stellar Attack", "Terran Assault", "Aquatic Combat")	MS-DOS	November 19, 1996	Apogee	
Shadow Warrior ("Enter the Wang", "Code of Honor")	MS-DOS (Note: 3D Realms produced a Mac OS version of Shadow Warrior in 1997. Two expansion packs, Wanton Destruction and Twin Dragon, were developed and by other companies in 1998, with Twin Dragon being released that year and Wanton Destruction abandoned until 2005. In 2012, a Microsoft Windows port was released by Devolver Digital, and General Arcade developed a port of the game for iOS.)	May 13, 1997	3D Realms	
Balls of Steel	Windows	December 12, 1997	Wildfire Studios	
Max Payne ("The American Dream", "A Cold Day in Hell", "A Bit Closer to Heaven")	Windows (Note: Max Payne was ported to the PlayStation 2 (2001), Xbox (2001), macOS (2002), Game Boy Advance (2003), iOS (2012), and Android (2012) without involvement by 3D Realms.)	July 23, 2001	Remedy Entertainment (Note: Max Payne was published by Gathering of Developers, while 3D Realms provided funding, direction, and marketing.)	
Max Payne 2: The Fall of Max Payne ("The Darkness Inside", "A Binary Choice", "Waking Up from the American Dream")	Windows, PlayStation 2, Xbox	October 14, 2003	Remedy Entertainment (Note: Max Payne 2 was developed by Remedy Entertainment and published by Rockstar Games; 3D Realms describes itself as the producer of the game.)	
Duke Nukem Mobile (Note: The name Duke Nukem Mobile was used for both a 2004 mobile game for cell phones and a different 2005 game for the Tapwave Zodiac, both by Machineworks Northwest. The Zodiac game was ported to mobile phones in mid-2005 as Duke Nukem Mobile 3D, and a modified version was released for mobile phones in early 2007 as Duke Nukem Arena.)	Mobile phones	January 15, 2004	Machineworks Northwest	
Duke Nukem Mobile	Tapwave Zodiac	May 2004	Machineworks Northwest	
Duke Nukem Mobile II: Bikini Project	Mobile phones	September 2005	Machineworks Northwest	
Prey	Windows, Xbox 360	July 11, 2006	3D Realms, Human Head Studios (Note: Prey was published by 2K Games and was developed for 6 years by 3D Realms, with Human Head Studios joining as developers for a further 5 years. It was ported to macOS (2007) and Linux (2008).)	
Duke Nukem Forever	Windows, macOS, PlayStation 3, Xbox 360	June 10, 2011	3D Realms, Triptych Games, Gearbox Software, Piranha Games (Note: Duke Nukem Forever was published by 2K Games and was developed for 13 years by 3D Realms, until the development department was closed in 2009. Development of the game was continued by the developers as Triptych Games, and the game was completed 2 years later by a combination effort by Triptych Games, Gearbox Software, and Piranha Games. Triptych Games released an expansion pack in 2011, The Doctor Who Cloned Me, which added another single player campaign.)	
Bombshell (Note: Bombshell began development as Duke Nukem: Mass Destruction, before being canceled in 2014 due to an infringement claim by Gearbox Software, who owned the rights to the Duke Nukem series. After the project was stopped, Interceptor modified it to be unrelated to Duke Nukem.)	Windows	January 29, 2016	Interceptor Entertainment	
Rad Rodgers: World One	Windows	December 1, 2016	Interceptor Entertainment	
Graveball	Windows	July 31, 2018	Goin' Yumbo Games	
ZIQ	Windows, macOS, Nintendo Switch	August 1, 2018 (Note: TBA on Nintendo Switch.)	Midnight Sea Studios	
Ion Fury	Windows, macOS, Linux, PlayStation 4, Nintendo Switch, Xbox One	August 15, 2019 (Note: Ion Fury was released in Early Access on February 28, 2018, under the name Ion Maiden. It was published by 1C Entertainment on consoles.)	Voidpoint	
Ghostrunner	Windows, PlayStation 4, Xbox One	October 27, 2020	One More Level, Slipgate Ironworks (Note: Ghostrunner was published by 505 Games and All in! Games; 3D Realms describes itself as the co-producer and distributor of the game.)	
Cultic	Windows	October 13, 2022 (Note: Chapter One)	Jasozz Games	
The Kindeman Remedy	Windows	November 16, 2023	Troglobytes Games	
Kingpin: Reloaded	Windows, PlayStation 4, Xbox One, Nintendo Switch	December 5, 2023	Xatrix Entertainment, Slipgate Ironworks (Note: Kingpin: Reloaded is a remastered version of Kingpin: Life of Crime. The remaster was published by the original publisher Interplay Entertainment and 3D Realms.)	
Graven	Windows, PlayStation 4, PlayStation 5, Xbox One, Xbox Series X/S, Nintendo Switch	January 23, 2024	Slipgate Ironworks (Note: Graven was co-published by Fulqrum Publishing.)	
Wrath: Aeon of Ruin	Windows, macOS, Linux, PlayStation 4, Nintendo Switch, Xbox One	February 27, 2024 (Note: Wrath: Aeon of Ruin was released in Early Access on November 22, 2019, and is co-published by Fulqrum Publishing.)	KillPixel, Slipgate Ironworks	
Phantom Fury	Windows, PlayStation 5, Xbox Series X/S, Nintendo Switch	April 23, 2024	Slipgate Ironworks	
Ripout	Windows, PlayStation 5, Xbox Series X/S	May 28, 2024 (Note: The game was released in early access on October 24, 2023.)	Pet Project Games	
Bloodless	Windows	August 29, 2024	Point N' Sheep	
Tempest Rising	Windows	April 17, 2025	Slipgate Ironworks, 2B Games (Note: Tempest Rising is co-published by Knights Peak.)	
Painkiller	Windows, PlayStation 5, Xbox Series X/S	October 21, 2025	Anshar Studios (Note: Painkiller will be co-published by Saber Interactive.)	
Core Decay	Windows	TBA	Ivar Hill, Slipgate Ironworks	
SiN: Reloaded	Windows	TBA	Ritual Entertainment, Nightdive Studios, Slipgate Ironworks (Note: SiN: Reloaded will be co-published by rights holder Nightdive Studios.)	
Combustion	Windows	TBA	Retro Dungeon, Slipgate Ironworks	
Twisted Tower	Windows	TBA	Atmos Games	

=== Games licensed by 3D Realms ===
Several spinoff games and remakes, especially in the Duke Nukem series, have been created with 3D Realms granting a license but without serving as the developer or publisher.

List of licensed games
Title	System	Release date	Developer	Publisher(s)	Ref(s).
Duke Nukem: Time to Kill	PlayStation	October 12, 1998	n-Space	GT Interactive	
Duke Nukem: Zero Hour	Nintendo 64	September 1, 1999	Eurocom	GT Interactive	
Duke Nukem: Land of the Babes	PlayStation	September 27, 2000	n-Space	Infogrames	
Duke Nukem: Manhattan Project	Windows (Note: Duke Nukem: Manhattan Project was ported to Mac OS (2009), Xbox 360 (2010), and iOS (2014).)	May 21, 2002	Sunstorm Interactive	Arush Entertainment	
Duke Nukem Advance	Game Boy Advance	August 12, 2002	Torus Games	Take-Two Interactive	
Prey Invasion	iOS	June 7, 2009	Machineworks Northwest	Hands-On Mobile	
Duke Nukem: Critical Mass	Nintendo DS	April 8, 2011	Frontline Studios	Deep Silver	
Rise of the Triad	Windows	July 31, 2013	Interceptor Entertainment	Apogee Software	
Shadow Warrior	Windows	September 26, 2013	Flying Wild Hog	Devolver Digital	
Wacky Wheels HD	Windows, macOS	October 26, 2016	Ferocity 2D	Ferocity 2D	
Crystal Caves HD	Windows, Linux	October 15, 2020	Emberheart Games	Apogee Software	
Secret Agent HD	Windows, Linux	June 30, 2021	Emberheart Games	Apogee Software	
Monster Bash HD	Windows, Linux	October 29, 2021	Emberheart Games	Apogee Software	
Rise of the Triad: Ludicrous Edition	Windows, PlayStation 4, PlayStation 5, Xbox One, Xbox Series X/S, Nintendo Switch	July 31, 2023	Nightdive Studios	Apogee Entertainment / New Blood Interactive (Note: The game was announced in 2020 with 3D Realms and Apogee Entertainment as co-publishers. 3D Realms left the project in 2022.)	

=== Canceled games ===
Several game projects were begun and abandoned before completion that had Apogee/3D Realms as the developer or publisher. Some of these were later completed by another developer or publisher, though many were not. In addition to these games, there are projects that were conceived but never began development, such as Dino Days (1991) and Commander Keen: The Universe is Toast! (1992), and titles which had preliminary agreements or offers for 3D Realms to publish where a final agreement was never reached either because the project was canceled or another publisher was chosen instead.

List of canceled games
Title	Planned system(s)	Cancelation date	Developer(s)	Ref(s).
The Underground Empire of Kroz	MS-DOS	1991	Apogee	
Gateworld	MS-DOS	1992 (Note: After Gateworld's cancelation, the project was finished by Homebrew Software, who released it in 1993.)	Apogee	
Fantasy 3D	MS-DOS	1993	Peter Jungck	
Cybertank 3D	MS-DOS	1993	Frank Maddin	
Tubes	MS-DOS	1993 (Note: After Tubes's cancelation, the project was finished by Absolute Magic and published by Software Creations in 1993.)	Absolute Magic	
BoulderDash 5000	MS-DOS	1993		
Nuclear Nightmare	Windows	1993		
Angels Five	MS-DOS	1993		
The Second Sword	MS-DOS	1993	Cygnus Studios	
Wards of Wandaal	MS-DOS	1993		
Megaloman	MS-DOS	1994	Apogee	
Monster Bash VGA	MS-DOS	1995	Apogee	
Crazy Baby	MS-DOS	1995 (Note: After Crazy Baby's cancelation, the project was finished by New Generation Software and published by CDV Software as Clif Danger in 1996.)	Apogee	
Fumes	MS-DOS	1995		
Crystal Carnage	MS-DOS	1995		
Ruins: Return of the Gods	MS-DOS	1995 (Note: After Ruins: Return of the Gods' cancelation, the project was finished by Lobotomy Software and published by Playmates Interactive and BMG Interactive as PowerSlave (Exhumed in Europe and A.D. 1999 in Japan) in 1996 for PC, PlayStation, and Sega Saturn.)	3D Realms	
Ravager	MS-DOS	1996 (Note: After Ravager's cancelation, the project was finished by Inner Circle Creations and published by Softdisk as Alien Rampage in 1996.)	Apogee	
Cyberboard Kid	MS-DOS	1996 (Note: After Cyberboard Kid's cancelation, the project was finished and published by Reality Studios as Cyril Cyberpunk in 1996.)	Apogee	
Duke Nukem Forever	MS-DOS	1997 (Note: Title reused for Duke Nukem Forever, though the games have no other development relationship.)	3D Realms	
Blood	MS-DOS	1997 (Note: Blood was initially overseen by 3D Realms, but in 1997 Monolith Productions bought the developer and the rights to the game. Blood was published by GT Interactive the same year for MS DOS.)	Q Studios	
Descent: FreeSpace – The Great War	Windows	1998 (Note: 3D Realms was initially to be a distributor for Descent (1995), but sold off the rights to Interplay Productions before the game was released. As a part of the deal, 3D Realms reserved the right to publish Parallax Software's next game, which was inherited by Volition when it split from the company and was therefore Descent: FreeSpace. Prior to release, however, Interplay became the actual publisher, with 3D Realms serving as only the merchant of record for a shareware version for the first three months; Interplay bought out the rights to that as well shortly after release.)	Volition	
Duke Nukem: Endangered Species Hunter	Windows	2001	Action Forms	
Duke Nukem: D-Day	PlayStation 2	2003 (Note: Duke Nukem: D-Day was planned to be published by Rockstar Games.)	n-Space	
Earth No More	Windows, PlayStation 3, Xbox 360	2008 (Note: Earth No More and Prey 2 were announced in 2006 as projects 3D Realms was to publish, but both were sold to Radar Group in 2008. Prey 2 was canceled in 2011, while no information about Earth No More was ever released.)	Recoil Games	
Prey 2	Windows, PlayStation 3, Xbox 360	2008	Human Head Studios	
Shadow Stalkers	Windows, macOS, Linux, PlayStation 4	2018 (Note: The game was announced in 2017 with 3D Realms as co-publisher. No information was released since then, aside from Frederik Schreiber's statement on the company's Discord server that 3D Realms is not a publisher anymore.)	3D Realms, Zoom Platform	
