= List of platformers =

This article gives a list of platformers. There are both 2D and 3D variants of such games, with the latter becoming more prevalent from the 32/64-bit era and up to the present.

== 2D ==
Platform or sidescrolling game series that originated in 2D.

- 10 Second Ninja X
- A Boy and His Blob
- Adventure Island
- Aero the Acro-Bat
- Akane the Kunoichi
- Aladdin
- Alex Kidd
- Alien Carnage (Halloween Harry)
- Amazing Princess Sarah
- Another World
- Apple Panic
- Ardy Lightfoot
- Batman
- Beauty and the Beast
- Bebe's Kids
- Blackthorne
- Blaster Master
- Bonk series
- Braid
- Brian the Lion
- Bubble Bobble
- Bucky O'Hare
- Bud Redhead - The Time Chase
- Bugs Bunny
- Captain Claw
- Captain Comic
- Castlevania series
- Cave Story
- Celeste
- Chakan: The Forever Man
- Chuck Rock
- Commander Keen series
- Cosmo's Cosmic Adventure
- Crystal Caves
- Dangerous Dave
- Darkwing Duck
- Dig Dug
- Dizzy series
- DuckTales
- ElecHead
- Elevator Action
- Fancy Pants
- Fireboy and Watergirl
- Fire and Ice
- Flashback
- Friday the 13th
- Flying Dragon: The Secret Scroll
- Flying Warriors
- Freedom Planet
- Gentlemen!
- Geometry Dash
- Getting Over It with Bennett Foddy
- Ghosts 'n Goblins series
- Gods (video game)
- Gunslugs series
- Heart of Darkness
- Hocus Pocus
- Hollow Knight
- Ice Climber
- Jazz Jackrabbit series
- Jet Set Willy
- Jetpack
- Jill of the Jungle
- Jumpman / Jumpman Junior
- Kangaroo
- Kid Icarus
- Kirby series
- Knytt
- Lady Sia
- Legend of Kage
- Lode Runner
- Manic Miner
- MapleStory
- Mappy
- Mega Man series
- Metroid
- Miner 2049er
- Monster Bash
- Mr. Nutz: Hoppin' Mad and Mr. Nutz
- Mutant Mudds
- N
- Ninja Five-O
- Ninja Gaiden series (8-bit console versions only)
- Öoo
- Ori and the Blind Forest
- Pac-Land
- Pitfall! series
- Pizza Tower
- Ponpoko
- Popeye
- Prinny: Can I Really Be the Hero?
- Punky Skunk
- Ristar
- Rocket Knight Adventures
- Secret Agent
- Seiklus
- Shadow of the Beast
- Shantae
- Shinobi series
- Shovel Knight
- Snow Bros
- Sonic the Hedgehog series
- Space Panic
- SpeedRunners
- Speedy Eggbert
- Strider
- Superfrog
- Super Mario Bros. series
- Super Meat Boy
- Techno Cop
- Teenage Mutant Ninja Turtles games
- The Lion King
- The Simpsons games
- ToeJam & Earl series
- Transformice
- Ugh!
- Vectorman series
- VVVVVV
- Wario Land series
- Whomp 'Em
- Wonder Boy series
- WonderKing Online
- Wrecking Crew
- Xargon

== 2.5D ==
A mix of 2D gameplay/3D style gameplay. See 2.5D.

- Bionic Commando: Rearmed series
- Blade Kitten
- Castle of Illusion Starring Mickey Mouse (2013)
- Goemon's Great Adventure
- Klonoa series
- LittleBigPlanet series
- LostWinds
- New Super Mario Bros. series
- Pandemonium
- Shadow Complex
- Sonic Colors (DS Version)
- Sonic Generations (3DS Version)
- Sonic Rush series
- Sonic the Hedgehog 4
- Sonic Unleashed, Sonic Colors (Wii Version) and the remastered version Sonic Colors: Ultimate, Sonic Generations (PS3 and 360 Versions), Sonic Lost World (Wii U Version) and Sonic Forces - Mainly 3D with 2D sections. Sonic Generations includes the option to play as Classic Sonic, whose gameplay is set in 2D.
- Super Paper Mario - Combination 2.5D - 3D platforming/RPG
- Super Smash Bros. series
- Toki Tori series
- Tomba! series
- Trine
- Viewtiful Joe series
- Yoshi's Story

== 3D ==
Platform game series that were born in 3D.

- 40 Winks
- A Hat in Time
- Alice: Madness Returns
- American McGee's Alice
- Ape Escape series
- Astro Bot
- Banjo-Kazooie
- Billy Hatcher and the Giant Egg
- Blinx
- Bug! series
- Bugs Bunny & Taz: Time Busters
- Bugs Bunny: Lost in Time
- Castleween
- Chameleon Twist
- Clive 'N' Wrench
- Conan
- Crash Bandicoot series
- Croc series
- Darwin's Paradox!
- Dr. Muto
- Frogger series
- Gift
- I-Ninja
- Jak and Daxter series
- Jet Set Radio Future
- Jet Set Radio
- Jett Rocket
- Jersey Devil
- Jumping Flash! series
- Kameo: Elements of Power
- Kao The Kangaroo
- Kingsley's Adventure
- Knack
- Legend of Kay
- Malice
- Maximo series
- Mega Man X7
- Mr. Robot
- Mushroom Men
- Nicktoons: Attack of the Toybots
- Nicktoons: Battle for Volcano Island
- Nicktoons: Globs of Doom
- Pac-Man World series
- Penny's Big Breakaway
- Pingwinek Kelvin
- Portal Runner
- Psychonauts
- Rascal
- Ratchet & Clank series
- Rocket: Robot on Wheels
- Rollin' Rascal
- Ruff Trigger: The Vanocore Conspiracy
- Scaler
- SEUM: Speedrunners from Hell
- Shadow Blade
- Skylar & Plux
- Sly Cooper and the Thievius Raccoonus
- Sonic Adventure series
- Sorcery
- Spare Parts
- Spyro the Dragon series
- Super Mario Galaxy
- Super Lucky's Tale
- Super Monkey Ball series
- Tak and the Power of Juju series
- The Big Catch
- Tomb Raider series
- Tonic Trouble
- Tork: Prehistoric Punk
- Toy Story 2: Buzz Lightyear to the Rescue
- Ty the Tasmanian Tiger series
- Vexx
- Voodoo Vince
- Whiplash
- Yooka-Laylee
- Zapper: One Wicked Cricket

== 2D to 3D ==
Game series that were initial 2D and evolved into 3D at some point in their sequels.

- Bubsy series
- Canimals series
- Castlevania series
- Cinnamoroll series
- Conker series
- Donkey Kong series (2D to 2.5D)
- Duke Nukem series
- Earthworm Jim series
- Gex series
- Hello Kitty series
- Keroppi series
- Kirby series
- Moshi Monsters series
- My Melody series
- Nikoderiko: The Magical World
- Ninja Gaiden series
- Oddworld
- Prince of Persia series
- Rayman series
- Rygar
- Sonic the Hedgehog series
- Spark the Electric Jester series
- Super Mario series
- Tamagotchi series
- The Great Giana Sisters

== Others ==
- A Nightmare on Elm Street
- Abuse
- Captain America and The Avengers (NES version only)
- CarVup
- Chuckie Egg
- Cliffhanger
- Congo Bongo
- Crazy Climber
- Demolition Man
- Donald Duck
- Doukutsu Monogatari (Cave Story)
- Eternal Daughter
- Felix the Cat
- Futurama
- Gilligan's Island
- Gish
- Glover
- Haunted Castle
- Hook
- Icy Tower
- Inspector Gadget
- Judge Dredd
- Jungle Hunt / Jungle King
- Jurassic Park games (Genesis)
- Knight Lore
- Kung Fu
- Mickey Mouse games
- Monkey Labour
- Monster Party
- Monty on the Run
- New Zealand Story
- Plok
- Q*bert
- QWAK
- Rambo
- Ren and Stimpy
- RoboCop
- Roc 'N Rope
- Roller Coaster
- Rush 'n Attack
- Spider-Man games
- Superman games (Sega Genesis and SNES)
- The Incredible Hulk
- The Jungle Book
- The Lion King
- The Smurfs games

== See also ==
- Lists of video games
