= Apogee Entertainment =

American video game publisher

- Formerly: Apogee Software, LLC (2008–2021)
- Type: Private
- Industry: Video games
- Founded: July 14, 2008; 17 years ago
- Founder: Terry Nagy
- Headquarters: Rowlett, Texas, US
- Website: apogeeent.com

Apogee Entertainment, formerly Apogee Software, LLC, is an American video game publisher based in Rowlett, Texas. The company was founded by Terry Nagy in 2008 after he licensed the rights to the name and logo from Scott Miller and his company, 3D Realms, which had used both previously. After reorganizing as Apogee Entertainment in 2021, it hired Miller for its publishing operations.

== History ==
The original Apogee Software was founded by Scott Miller in 1987 and utilized the Apogee name and logo until 1996, when the company adopted the trade name "3D Realms". In 2008, Terry Nagy, a college friend of Miller, licensed the rights to the "Apogee Software" name and logo, as well as the rights to several games developed under that name, and established a company to publish further titles using the moniker. The publisher's opening was announced at the Electronic Entertainment Expo on July 14, 2008.

The company immediately announced the Duke Nukem Trilogy, three new games in the Duke Nukem series—Critical Mass, Chain Reaction, and Proving Grounds—to be released on Nintendo DS and PlayStation Portable. A co-publishing deal was reached with Deep Silver to ensure wide distribution of the titles. Critical Mass was released for Nintendo DS in May 2011, however, its PlayStation Portable version, as well as Chain Reaction and Proving Grounds, ultimately stayed unreleased. Apogee Software, LLC released Interceptor Entertainment's Rise of the Triad and the Apogee Throwback Pack in July 2013, as well as Radical Heroes: Crimson City Crisis from Mad Unicorn Games in 2016.

During 3D Realms' "Realms Deep 2020" event in September 2020, Apogee Software, LLC announced remastered editions of the original Rise of the Triad (co-published by 3D Realms) and Crystal Caves.

The company announced it was rebranding itself to Apogee Entertainment in April 2021 and focusing solely on indie game publishing. Alongside this announcement, the company announced that they brought on Miller to assist in publishing efforts.

== Games published ==
Year	Title	Platform(s)	Developer(s)
2011	Duke Nukem: Critical Mass	Nintendo DS	Frontline Studios
2013	Rise of the Triad	Windows	Interceptor Entertainment
2016	Radical Heroes: Crimson City Crisis	Windows	Mad Unicorn Games
2020	Crystal Caves HD	Windows	Emberheart Games
2021	Residual	Nintendo Switch, PlayStation 4, PlayStation 5, Windows, Xbox One, Xbox Series X/S	OrangePixel
2021	Secret Agent HD	Windows	Emberheart Games
2021	Monster Bash HD	Windows	Emberheart Games
2023	Bread & Fred	Windows	SandCastles Studio
2023	Rise of the Triad: Ludicrous Edition	Nintendo Switch, PlayStation 4, PlayStation 5, Windows, Xbox One, Xbox Series X/S	Nightdive Studios, New Blood Interactive
2023	Turbo Overkill	Nintendo Switch, PlayStation 4, PlayStation 5, Windows, Xbox One, Xbox Series X/S	Trigger Happy Interactive
2023	Below the Stone	Nintendo Switch, PlayStation 4, PlayStation 5, Windows, Xbox One, Xbox Series X/S	Strollart
2024	Quest Master	Windows	Skydevilpalm
2025	Total Chaos	Windows, PlayStation 5, Xbox Series X/S	Trigger Happy Interactive
2025	Wizordum	Windows	Emberheart Games
TBA	Dead Fury	Nintendo Switch, PlayStation 4, PlayStation 5, Windows, Xbox One, Xbox Series X/S	Funder Studios
TBA	Elements	Nintendo Switch, PlayStation 4, PlayStation 5, Windows, Xbox One, Xbox Series X/S	WreckIt Games
TBA	Lucid	Nintendo Switch, PlayStation 4, PlayStation 5, Windows, Xbox One, Xbox Series X/S	The Matte Black Studio
TBA	Exocide	Nintendo Switch, PlayStation 4, PlayStation 5, Windows, Xbox One, Xbox Series X/S	Hellforge Studios
TBA	Vexlands	Windows	Apogee Entertainment
TBA	Littlelands	Windows	Rafael Martin
