= Lee Jackson (composer) =

American composer (born 1963)

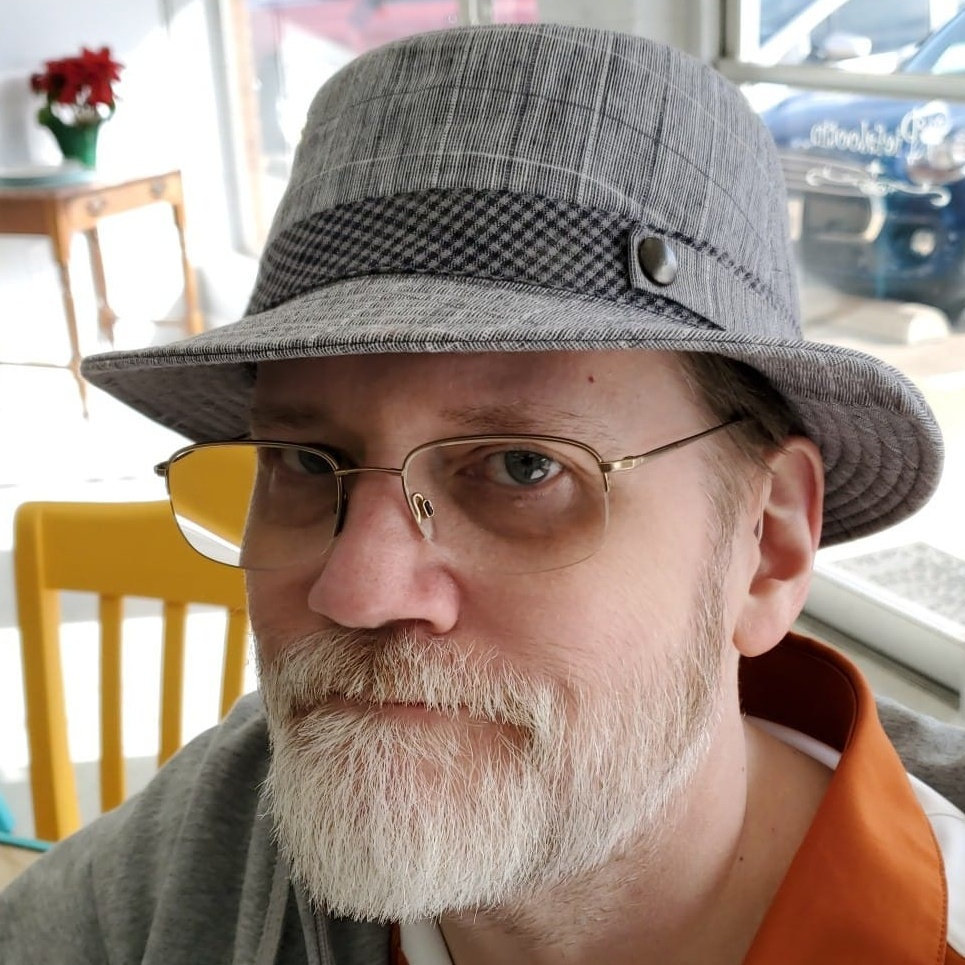
- Jackson in 2020

Background information
- Born: November 19, 1963 (age 62)
- Origin: Austin, Texas, United States
- Genre: Video game music
- Occupations: Composer, game audio designer/director/producer
- Instruments: Bassoon, bass clarinet, marimba/xylophone, tympani and other percussion, synths and samplers, other MIDI instruments and sample libraries
- Years active: 1994–2002, 2016, 2018, 2020-present
- Label: Lee Jackson
- Website: dleejackson.lbjackson.com

Lee Jackson (born 19 November 1963) is an American composer. He was the music and sound director for the video game developer 3D Realms from 1994 through 2002, and is currently a freelance composer of music for chamber ensembles, concert bands, and orchestras.

== Game music and audio development ==
He is most well known for his work on Duke Nukem 3D and Rise of the Triad, specifically for creating Duke Nukem 3D's main theme titled "Grabbag". He collaborated with Robert Prince to create the two games' instrumental background tracks.

While at Apogee/3D Realms, Jackson also served as the primary composer for the later 3D Realms title Shadow Warrior, and was involved with many other games published by 3D Realms and Apogee Software. His duties also called for sound design on Shadow Warrior and on early versions of Duke Nukem Forever.

Jackson also did voice acting, direction, and effects for games by Apogee and 3D Realms, as well as for the Balls of Steel pinball game, released under the Apogee one-off subsidiary Pinball Wizards label. His own voice acting characters include the "Fat Commander" in Duke Nukem 3D, the "Doug Wendt" character in Rise of the Triad, and "Zilla" in Shadow Warrior. Aside from performing several characters used in Balls of Steel, he also auditioned talent and directed recording sessions for Apogee and 3D Realms games at Bill Reardon's RR Brand Productions studio in Dallas.

Jackson's voice can also be heard in the music for two games. He incorporated his voice into the music for a level of Apogee's Stargunner, and used it as a sampled instrument in a track for Shadow Warrior.

In 2016, Jackson worked with Gearbox Software to create new songs for the Duke Nukem 3D: 20th Anniversary World Tour game.

A series of "Composers Play" interviews published on YouTube in December 2018 covers much of his involvement in Duke Nukem 3D, as well as some of the history behind how he got his start writing music for videogames. Another "Composers Play" interview came out in late January 2019, this time covering Lee's involvement in Rise of the Triad.

In 2021, Jackson joined Doomworld, a Doom community forum website, after being invited by another member of the forums. There, he has authored and contributed several new General MIDI tracks for community projects.

=== Duke Nukem 3D ===
Jackson is most well known for his work on Duke Nukem 3D, specifically for creating Duke Nukem 3D's main theme titled "Grabbag". He collaborated with Robert Prince to create the instrumental background tracks for the first three episodes of the game. Jackson created all of the tracks for the fourth episode of Duke Nukem 3D, better known as the "Plutonium PAK Add-On" or as the full four-episode "Atomic Edition". In 2016, a remake and remaster called Duke Nukem 3D: 20th Anniversary World Tour was released, containing a new fifth episode by the original level designers, and containing new original music by Jackson.

Grabbag has elicited many spin-offs and remixes over the years by both fans and professional musicians, including an officially sanctioned studio version by the popular thrash metal outfit Megadeth. Another version of the song was recorded by Chris Kline in August 2005. 3D Realms featured it on the front page of their website and contracted with Kline to use it to promote their Xbox Live release of Duke Nukem 3D. Grabbag was brought back and used again as the theme song for the 2011 release of Duke Nukem Forever.

=== Professional memberships ===
Jackson was one of the first people to qualify for full voting membership in National Academy of Recording Arts and Sciences (the Grammy organization) based solely on works published with video games. He was also a member of the NARAS Producers & Engineers Wing, although this has since shifted to the Songwriters & Composers Wing. Jackson celebrated his 25th year anniversary as a member of the organization in 2022.

In May 2018, Jackson was elected to membership in ASCAP (the American Society of Composers, Authors, and Publishers) for publication of his album, Calibrations.

=== Scholastic Instrumental Competition Lists ===
Jackson returned to writing music for "real world" ensembles (e.g., brass quintets, woodwind quintets, concert bands, and symphony orchestras) in 2023. Since that time, three of his works have been chosen by the Texas University Interscholastic League to be included on the organization's Prescribed Music List, beginning with the 2026-2027 edition. The works chosen are as follows:

UIL PML Works by Lee Jackson
| Title | UIL Event Name | PML Code | Instrumentation | Publisher |
|---|---|---|---|---|
| Chorale and Fugue in F Major | Double Reed Ensemble | 272-1-41915 | QUINTET (2 ob, EH, 2 bsn) | Cimarron Music Press |
| Fanfare and Processions | Brass Quintet | 351-1-42030 | QUINTET (2 tpt, hn, tbn, tuba) | Cimarron Music Press |
| Bohemian Galop | Miscellaneous Horn Ensemble | 373-1-42160 | SEXTET (6 hn) | International Horn Society |

== Biography ==
Prior to his career with Apogee/3D Realms, Jackson attended the University of Texas at Austin from 1981–1983 as a Music Education major and was initiated into the Alpha Iota chapter of Phi Mu Alpha Sinfonia in the fall of 1982. He was also a member of the flag section of the University of Texas Longhorn Band and played bassoon in the UT Wind Ensemble and Symphony Band. He left the University in 1983 and went to work for the Internal Revenue Service's Austin Service Center with his wife, Brenda, whom he had married the same year. The two had a son, Nathan, in 1986. Jackson and Brenda both worked at the IRS until 1993, when Jackson joined Apogee Software's technical support department. He was promoted to the Music and Sound Director position in 1996. His wife, Brenda, retired from the IRS's office in Dallas in October 2018.

=== The Hack report ===
Before and briefly after moving to the Dallas area, Jackson published a monthly report that was distributed through the FidoNet network and the "hack-l" newsgroup of the Internet, called "The Hack Report". This report was distributed for free to sysop of any Bulletin Board System and to anyone else who offered files for download. It was an attempt to help users and sysops alike avoid "fraudulent programs." Malicious files that contained viruses or did harm to a system when executed were of course covered, but the report also covered programs which were either jokes or attempts to earn "download points" in exchange for uploading "new files," such as ones which had been edited with a hex editor to look like a new version but which were actually the same as the real current version. The report was published through much of 1992 and 1993, with the help of contributors from around the world. It earned coverage in the 1994 book "Cyberlife!", although the authors of the chapter in which it was featured called it "The 'Hacker' Report."

=== O. Henry Pun-Off World Championships ===
In the early-to-mid 1990s, Jackson competed in and won first-place honors in the O. Henry Pun-Off World Championships, held yearly at the O. Henry Museum in Austin, Texas. He won the prepared pun category twice ("Punniest of Show," 1992 and 1995) and the head-to-head competition once ("High Lies and Low Puns," now called the "Punslingers" category) in 1991. Jackson is also a charter member of Punsters United Nearly Yearly (a.k.a. "P.U.N.Y.), a support group for punsters dedicated to holding the World Championships competition.

=== Radio ===
Jackson began working a radio producer and on-air traffic and news reporter out of what was the Dallas / Fort Worth market of Metro Networks in 2004. He continued his position during the purchase of Metro Networks by Clear Channel Communications and stayed on during the eventual folding of Metro into Clear Channel's Total Traffic Network subsidiary in 2011. He primarily provided traffic reports on the 9:00 p.m. to 5:00 a.m. overnight shift for 1080 KRLD (AM) in Dallas from 2006 until late 2012, when poor health forced him to go on disability status.

Jackson was one of many former 3D Realms employees who worked on the long-delayed Duke Nukem Forever and who attended the game's Happy Ending launch party held on June 11, 2011 at the Palladium Ballroom in Dallas, along with his wife and son.

== Debut album ==
On March 30, 2018, Jackson published his debut 14-track solo album, Calibrations. He also personally made available a ten-disc signed and numbered Collector's Edition of the album, which sold out. Three of the songs on the album were new, while nine were songs composed for episode five of the Duke Nukem 3D: 20th Anniversary World Tour game. The remaining two tracks include an interview conducted by Jake "The Voice" Parr and a reading of special thanks. Of the three new tracks, Track 12, "Spicewood," was dedicated to Jackson's late grandparents, who lived in the community of Spicewood on Lake Travis, northwest of Austin, Texas.

== Discography ==
Video games

| Year | Title | Notes |
|---|---|---|
| 1993 | Blake Stone: Aliens of Gold | Tech Support |
| 1994 | Wacky Wheels | Tech Support |
| 1995 | Terminal Velocity | Beta tester |
| 1995 | Rise of the Triad | With Bobby Prince |
| 1996 | Duke Nukem 3D | With Bobby Prince |
| 1996 | Stargunner | |
| 1997 | Shadow Warrior | |
| 1997 | Duke Nukem 64 | |
| 1997 | Balls of Steel | |
| 1998 | Duke Nukem: Time to Kill | Original Duke Theme |
| 1999 | Duke Nukem: Zero Hour | Speech editing |
| 1999 | Duke Nukem (Game Boy Color) | Special thanks |
| 2000 | Duke Nukem: Land of the Babes | Duke Voice Production |
| 2002 | Duke Nukem Advance | Original Sound |
| 2011 | Duke Nukem Forever | Additional sound design |
| 2013 | Rise of the Triad | Special Thanks |
| 2016 | Duke Nukem 3D: 20th Anniversary World Tour | New music for "Alien World Order". |

Albums

| Year | Title |
|---|---|
| 2018 | Calibrations |
| 2020 | Derivations |
| 2021 | Duke Nukem Tank Tracks |
| 2022 | Lady Tygress' Suite and Other Commissions |
| 2025 | Going Big |

Voice acting

| Year | Title | Role(s) |
|---|---|---|
| 1995 | Rise of the Triad | Doug Wendt, Death Monk |
| 1996 | Duke Nukem 3D | Assault Commander, "The Birth" Intro Alien |
| 1997 | Shadow Warrior | Zilla |

== See also ==
- Robert Prince (video game composer)
