= List of minor Apogee Software video games =

The following is a list of the earliest, lesser-known video games published by Apogee Software. For a full listing of Apogee/3D Realms games, see list of 3D Realms games.

== Games ==
=== Adventure Fun-Pak ===
Adventure Fun-Pak
- Developer: Apogee Software
- Publisher: Apogee Software
- Designer: various
- Platform: MS-DOS
- Release: 1989
- Genre: various
- Mode: Single-player

Adventure Fun-Pak is a collection of four video games created by Scott Miller and various independent developers who submitted their programs to Apogee for publication. Miller categorized these submissions by genre and released this collection and the companion Puzzle Fun-Pak as non-shareware commercial products. Each collection was sold as a single package distributed on one floppy disk. Apogee re-released both collections as freeware on 28 May 2004. The following games are included:

- Night Bomber is an artillery game in which the player attempts to destroy as many cities as possible by issuing orders to a gun to fire projectiles at a specified angle.
- Raiders of the Forbidden Mine (also known as Raiders of the Lost Mine, Diamond Digger and Gold Miner) is a real-time action game with gameplay and a third-person perspective reminiscent of Dig Dug and Paganitzu. The objective is to collect as many gold nuggets as possible by maneuvering the player character through a series of levels situated in an underground mine while evading enemies capable of killing upon contact. Each level contains oxygen boxes to ensure the player character does not run out of breathable air and a key needed to unlock the door to the next level.
- Rogue Runner (also known as Maze Runner) utilizes ASCII graphics to depict a maze from an overhead third-person perspective. Gameplay is similar to Apogee's Kroz series; the objective in each level of the maze is to maneuver the player character in real-time through a series of corridors and evade enemies to find the entrance to the next level. Scattered throughout each level are pickaxes which may be used to kill attacking opponents, teleport scrolls capable of instantly transporting the player character to a random point within that level's maze, and maps which reveal the maze to the player in greater detail. The game ends when the player retrieves the Heart of Courage from the deepest level of the dungeon or is killed by contact with an enemy. Designed by Scott Miller, the game was also published under the name Maze Runner in Softdisk's Big Blue Disk #26 released in December 1988.
- The Thing is a port of Hunt the Wumpus for MS-DOS.

=== Beyond the Titanic ===
Beyond the Titanic
- Developer: Apogee Software
- Publisher: Apogee Software
- Designer: Scott Miller
- Platform: MS-DOS
- Release: 1986
- Genre: Text adventure
- Mode: Single-player

Beyond the Titanic is a text adventure game written by Scott Miller for MS-DOS in Pascal in September 1984. No images accompany the game's textual descriptions, but a variety of colors are employed to enhance the layout of the game's text. A panel near the top of the screen continuously displays the player's score and number of moves thus far. Also included is the ability to save the game and restore a previously saved game. The game begins on the sinking ship Titanic from which an escape must be sought. Upon doing so the player character is swept away into a mysterious underground complex. The objective of the game is to escape these predicaments and find a way to return home to San Francisco.

Originally released in 1986 before Miller founded Apogee, the game was later branded and advertised as an Apogee product. Both it and Supernova are the only two games published by Apogee as traditional shareware. Miller permitted the full game to be freely copied and distributed by its users, but they were encouraged to "register" it by sending him a cash donation to compensate him for his effort, to "encourage the author to make new and better games" and to qualify for "telephone support and clues". Although he had hoped that donations accompanying user registrations would become a significant source of revenue, this expectation failed to be realized as most users did not register the game. He concluded that this strategy was not the way to start. It seemed to him that gamers were "more apt to simply take what they could get for free" and that he needed to introduce a greater incentive to get users to register his games. Miller's experience with Beyond the Titanic and Supernova led him to develop the Apogee model which would become Apogee's standard method of marketing future releases.

Beyond the Titanic was re-released as freeware by Apogee on March 10, 1998. The source code for the game was released as free software under the GPL-2.0-or-later license on March 20, 2009.

=== Jumpman Lives! ===
Jumpman Lives!
- Developer: Shamusoft Designs
- Publisher: Apogee Software
- Designer: Dave Sharpless
- Platform: MS-DOS
- Release: June 10, 1991
- Genre: Platform
- Mode: Single-player

Jumpman Lives! is an unauthorized 1991 MS-DOS remake of the Jumpman platform game released by Epyx in 1983. In Jumpman, the player character walks, jumps, and climbs ladders and ropes to clear each level of bombs. Both the original and the remake share the same plot: a multi-level orbital science station needs to be cleared of bombs planted by a radical group. In the original game the station orbits the planet Jupiter, but in the remake it is in orbit around Saturn. Included in the remake are levels from Jumpman, Jumpman Junior, and some newly created ones. Other enhancements in the remake include a level editor, Sound Blaster support, and three skill levels.

Dave Sharpless designed and developed the game in cooperation with Apogee. Scott Miller had obtained his address from a registration text file accompanying an earlier shareware game he had self-published. Miller contacted Sharpless, who agreed to create a Jumpman remake for Apogee. Once Sharpless had created the level editor, it was used to create the game's 45 levels. He did most of the level design himself while Apogee developed the game's introductory graphics, ordering information screens, and bonus levels. In accordance with Apogee's standard practice at the time, the game was split into three episodes. The first was freely distributable as shareware and the remaining three episodes were commercial products which could be purchased directly from Apogee. Each episode consists of approximately 12 levels.

PC Magazine's "PC MagNet News" column described it as a "clever" merge of arcade action and "intriguing" designs.

Permission had not been obtained from Epyx, the holder of the Jumpman copyright at the time. When Epyx learned of its existence, the company asked Apogee to discontinue it only a few months following its release. Apogee no longer retains any control over or copyright in this title.

=== Puzzle Fun-Pak ===
Puzzle Fun-Pak
- Developer: Apogee Software
- Publisher: Apogee Software
- Designer: various
- Platform: MS-DOS
- Release: 1989
- Genre: various
- Modes: Single-player, two player (Phrase Master)

Puzzle Fun-Pak is a collection of four video games created by Scott Miller and various independent developers who submitted their programs to Apogee for publication. Miller categorized these submissions by genre and released this collection and the companion Adventure Fun-Pak as non-shareware commercial products. Each collection was sold as a single package distributed on one floppy disk. Apogee re-released both collections as freeware on 28 May 2004. The following games are included:

- Asteroids Rescue (also known as Meteors) is a real-time game utilizing ASCII graphics in which the player must maneuver a spaceship through asteroids to rescue stranded astronauts. The player views the spaceship and its surroundings from an overhead third-person vantage point. The spaceship is equipped with ten missiles for destroying asteroids and a device for teleporting it to a random location within the asteroid field, but is capable of withstanding only five collisions with asteroids. The game ends when all the astronauts are rescued or the spaceship is destroyed by running out of fuel or colliding with too many asteroids. Designed by Scott Miller, the game was also published under the name Meteors in Softdisk's Big Blue Disk #30 released in April 1989.
- Block Five is a version of Go in which the player competes against a computer controlled opponent. Designed by Scott Miller, the game was also published in Softdisk's Big Blue Disk #32 released in June 1989.
- Maze Machine generates an overhead map of a random maze with corridors of a height and width specified by the user. The program's output may be sent to a printer so that the maze can be solved by hand.
- Phrase Master is a two player turn-based game in which each player must guess which letters appear in a phrase the program randomly chooses from its stock of five hundred phrases. Each player continues to make guesses until he or she guesses incorrectly, at which point the other player's turn begins.

=== Star Trek: The Next Generation Trivia ===
Star Trek: The Next Generation Trivia
- Developer: Micro F/X Software
- Publisher: Apogee Software
- Designer: George Broussard
- Platform: MS-DOS
- Release: NA: 1987
- Genre: Educational
- Mode: Single-player

Star Trek: The Next Generation Trivia (also known as Next Generation Trivia) is a trivia video game about the Star Trek: The Next Generation TV series written for MS-DOS. Developed by George Broussard and originally published by his label Micro F/X Software, it was marketed and distributed by Apogee after Broussard joined the company. The game consists of three volumes each featuring 100 multiple choice questions related to Star Trek: The Next Generation. Questions randomly chosen from the volume's database are sequentially presented to the player, who responds by selecting a numbered response from a list. For each correct answer, the game reveals a bonus Star Trek: The Next Generation fact. Players begin the game with three credits; every ten correct responses earn the player an additional credit, but each incorrect response costs the player one credit. When the player runs out of credits or has attempted all 100 questions, the game ends and the player's level of Star Trek: The Next Generation knowledge is ranked on the basis of how many questions were correctly answered. The game's look and feel is largely text-based, but multicolored ASCII line graphics and text are used to enhance the presentation.

Star Trek: The Next Generation Trivia was marketed via the Apogee model. Only the first volume was freely distributable as shareware; the remaining volumes were commercial products which could be purchased directly from Apogee.

When the Star Trek copyright holder Paramount discovered that Apogee was profiting from their intellectual property, they offered Apogee a license for the game idea. Apogee did not accept the offer, as the license would have cost more than what Apogee was making on the game. Therefore, Apogee discontinued the game, and they no longer retain any copyright or control over on it.

=== Super Game Pak ===
Super Game-Pak
- Developer: Apogee Software
- Publisher: Apogee Software
- Designer: Scott Miller
- Platform: MS-DOS
- Release: 1989
- Genre: various
- Mode: Single-player

Super Game Pak is a video game compilation published by Apogee in 1989 featuring a diverse selection of games previously released by Apogee or Scott Miller (prior to founding Apogee). It was marketed as an introduction to Apogee's game line. The collection includes:

- Asteroid Rescue
- Block Five
- Raiders of the Lost Mine
- Rogue Runner
- Trek Trivia (Volume 1)
- Word Whiz (Volume 1)

=== Supernova ===
Supernova
- Developer: Apogee Software
- Publisher: Apogee Software
- Designer: Scott Miller
- Platform: MS-DOS
- Release: 1987
- Genre: Text adventure
- Mode: Single-player

Supernova is a text adventure video game designed by Scott Miller for MS-DOS and published by Apogee Software. The game's text was co-written by Scott Miller and Terry Nagy. Although Supernova's plot is unrelated to that of Miller's previous text adventure Beyond the Titanic, its game engine and look and feel represent an evolutionary development from the earlier game. No images accompany the game's textual descriptions, but a variety of colors are employed to enhance the layout of the game's text. A panel near the top of the screen continuously displays the player's score, location, number of moves thus far, and the player character's condition (e.g. thirsty). Also included is the ability to save the game and restore a previously saved game. Miller wrote that the game features over four hundred sound effects, 16-color ASCII graphics, a hint command and a parser which recognizes over a thousand words. The game begins with the player character seeking employment on the surface of a barren mining planet. As the game progresses, the player discovers that an imminent supernova is threatening to destroy a planetary civilization. The main goal of the game is to save its inhabitants from this imminent catastrophe.

Originally released in 1987 before Miller founded Apogee, the game only made Miller around $1,000 while distributed through disk magazines like I.B.Magazette and Big Blue Disk. After the rights reverted to him, the game was later branded and advertised as an Apogee product. Both it and Beyond the Titanic are the only two games published by Apogee as traditional shareware. Miller permitted the full game to be freely copied and distributed by its users, but they were encouraged to "register" it by sending him a cash donation to compensate him for his effort, to "encourage the author to make new and better games" and to qualify for "telephone support and clues". Although he had hoped that donations accompanying user registrations would become a significant source of revenue, this expectation failed to be realized as most users did not register the game. He concluded that this strategy was not the way to start. It seemed to him that gamers were "more apt to simply take what they could get for free" and that he needed to introduce a greater incentive to get users to register his games. Miller's experience with Beyond the Titanic and Supernova led him to develop the Apogee model which would become Apogee's standard method of marketing future releases.

Apogee also sold the game's Turbo Pascal 3.0 source code and marketed it to "novice programmers trying to learn the 'tricks of the trade'".

Supernova was re-released as freeware by Apogee on March 26, 1998. The source code for the game was released as free software under the GPL-2.0-or-later license on March 20, 2009.

=== The Thor Trilogy ===
The Thor Trilogy
- Developer: Scenario Software
- Publisher: Apogee Software
- Designer: Todd Replogle
- Platform: MS-DOS
- Release: 1989
- Genre: Maze
- Mode: Single-player

The Thor Trilogy (also known as Caves of Thor) is a maze video game published in 1989 by Apogee Software. It was developed by Todd Replogle under the Scenario Software name.

The game places the player trapped within the Caves of Thor. The object of the game is to locate three missing items scattered throughout the place. The missing items are the Female-item, the Heart-item and the Male-item. The game's interface, gameplay and graphics are similar to a previous Apogee game, Kingdom of Kroz, and to the game ZZT.

The game was originally distributed as shareware. It consists of three volumes, with only the first volume distributed as shareware, and the rest available commercially. The volumes are:

- Volume I: Caves of Thor
- Volume II: Realm of Thor
- Volume III: Thor's Revenge

The source code of the game used to be available for U$195.00 (in 1990) directly from Todd Replogle. The game was discontinued, and it was later re-released as freeware by Apogee in December 2005.

The game includes PC speaker renditions of various classical music pieces, including Flight of the Bumblebee by Rimsky-Korsakov, two preludes from the Well-Tempered Clavier by J.S. Bach, and Solfeggietto by C.P.E. Bach.

=== Trek Trivia ===
Trek Trivia
- Developer: Apogee Software
- Publisher: Apogee Software
- Designer: Scott Miller
- Platform: MS-DOS
- Release: NA: 1986
- Genre: Educational
- Mode: Single-player

Trek Trivia is a trivia video game about the Star Trek TV series, written in Turbo Pascal 5.0 for MS-DOS and published by Apogee Software. The game consists of ten volumes each featuring 100 multiple choice questions related to Star Trek. Questions randomly chosen from the volume's database are sequentially presented to the player, who responds by selecting a numbered response from a list. For each correct answer, the game reveals a bonus Star Trek fact. Players begin the game with three credits; every ten correct responses earn the player an additional credit, but each incorrect response costs the player one credit. When the player runs out of credits or has attempted all 100 questions, the game ends and the player's level of Star Trek knowledge is ranked on the basis of how many questions were correctly answered. The game's look and feel is largely text-based, but multicolored ASCII line graphics and text are used to enhance the presentation.

Trek Trivia was marketed via the Apogee model. Only the first volume was freely distributable as shareware; the remaining volumes were commercial products which could be purchased directly from Apogee. Apogee also sold the game's Turbo Pascal 5.0 source code which it marketed to "novice programmers trying to learn the 'tricks of the trade'".

When the Star Trek copyright holder Paramount discovered that Apogee was profiting from their intellectual property, they offered Apogee a license for the game idea. Apogee did not accept the offer because the license would have cost more than what Apogee was making on the game. Therefore, Apogee discontinued the game, and they no longer retain any copyright or control over it.

=== Trivia Whiz ===
Trivia Whiz
- Developer: Micro F/X Software
- Publisher: Apogee Software
- Designer: George Broussard
- Platform: MS-DOS
- Release: 1988
- Genre: Educational game
- Mode: Single-player

Trivia Whiz is a general trivia game written for MS-DOS, published by Apogee Software. It was originally published by George Broussard under Micro F/X Software, before he joined Apogee.

Trivia Whiz was distributed as shareware. It consists of five volumes (named Volume 1 to 5), with only the first volume distributed as shareware, and the rest available commercially. Each volume has 100 multiple choice questions on a large variety of topics.

The game was discontinued, and it was later re-released as freeware by Apogee in December 2005.

=== Word Whiz ===
Word Whiz
- Developer: Apogee Software
- Publisher: Apogee Software
- Designer: Scott Miller
- Platform: MS-DOS
- Release: 1988
- Genre: Educational game
- Mode: Single-player

Word Whiz is a trivia game written for MS-DOS, published by Apogee Software. It consists of various questions about different English words.

Word Whiz was distributed as shareware. It consists of four volumes (named Volume 1 to 4), with only the first volume distributed as shareware, and the rest available commercially. Each volume has 100 multiple choice questions, each one about a specific word.

Word Whiz is written in Turbo Pascal 5.0 and the source code was for sale for $100.

The game was discontinued, and was later re-released as freeware by Apogee in December 2005. The source code for the game was released as free software under the GPL-2.0-or-later license on March 20, 2009.
