= Rise of the Triad =

1995 first-person shooter video game

- Cover art by Les Dorscheid
- Developer: Apogee Software (Note: Nightdive Studios developed Ludicrous Edition.)
- Publisher: Apogee Software (Note: Apogee Entertainment and New Blood Interactive co-published Ludicrous Edition.)
- Director: Tom Hall
- Producers: Tom Hall; George Broussard; Scott Miller
- Designers: Tom Hall; Joe Siegler; Marianna Vayntrub
- Programmers: Mark Dochtermann; Jim Dosé; William Scarboro
- Artists: Chuck Jones; Tim Neveu; Susan Singer
- Composers: Robert Prince; Lee Jackson; Andrew Hulshult (Ludicrous Edition)
- Engine: Wolfenstein 3D engine KEX Engine (Ludicrous Edition)
- Platforms: DOS, iOS, Windows, Nintendo Switch, PlayStation 4, Xbox One
- Release: DOS; December 21, 1994 (shareware); February 17, 1995 (full version) iOS; February 6, 2010; Ludicrous Edition; Microsoft Windows; July 31, 2023; Nintendo Switch, PlayStation 4, Xbox One; September 29, 2023
- Genre: First-person shooter
- Modes: Single-player, multiplayer

Rise of the Triad: Dark War is a first-person shooter video game, developed and published by Apogee Software in 1995. The player controls one of five members of a United Nations backed special forces unit, who have been sent to investigate a deadly cult operating on San Nicholas Island which seeks to destroy the nearby Los Angeles.

The shareware version of the game, released in 1994, is titled Rise of the Triad: The Hunt Begins and serves as a prequel to the main game. A remake was designed by Interceptor Entertainment and released by Apogee Games in 2013, while a remaster developed by Nightdive Studios and co-published by New Blood Interactive, titled Rise of the Triad: Ludicrous Edition, was released in 2023.

The game began production as a follow-up to Wolfenstein 3D, but was soon altered and became a stand-alone game. It is powered by a modified version of the Wolfenstein 3D engine, allowing for elevation, dynamic lighting and level-over-level environments.

== Gameplay ==
Like most early first-person shooter games, the single-player mode's objective is to collect keys in order to proceed through the levels. Occasionally, special tactics and simple problem-solving skills are required to reach locations. Although most levels are fairly linear, there are some maps which have multiple exits.

The player chooses between five characters: Taradino Cassatt, Thi Barrett, Lorelei Ni, Doug Wendt, and Ian Paul Freeley. The characters differ in three characteristics: hit points, speed, and accuracy. Taradino Cassatt is the only character available in the shareware version of the game and has average statistics: average hit points, average speed, average accuracy.

Certain enemies can beg for their life if they take enough damage, or fake their death. Some enemies dodge the player's attacks, while others lie on the ground to ambush the player. Other enemies can shoot nets to restrain the player, or steal and use weapons from the player. There are also four bosses. All enemies are digitized actors, mostly played by Apogee employees and their friends and family.

On random occasions, there are an especially large amount of gibs produced when an enemy is killed, presenting the player with a "Ludicrous Gibs!" message. The amount of gibs can be controlled through the options menu, which allows the player to set the graphics to various levels of goriness, from completely bloodless to extreme.

There are 13 weapons in the game, divided into three groups: bullet weapons (using infinite ammunition), missile weapons (using limited ammunition), and magic weapons. The missile weapons constitute the bulk of the arsenal, and usually have a wide area of effect. Magic weapons, like missile weapons, hold limited ammunition. Players can carry a total of four weapons at once: all three bullet weapons (a single pistol, dual pistols, and a submachine gun) and either a missile or a magic weapon.

Only one power-up can be active at once, and power-up effects last for a limited time.

Jump pads catapult a player in the air. By stepping onto one, the player character is propelled straight up, while by running up to it the player character can make long jumps. Jump pads are often required for getting past certain obstacles or reaching a ledge to retrieve a key. They can also be used for collecting powerups and bonuses.

Destructible objects such as ornaments or plants may block secret doors. If light poles and firepots are shot, the area dims. Glass can be shattered by shooting or running through it.

The game features food bowls as health items. By shooting one missile in the direction of certain food types, you warms them up, more than doubling the health restored when eating it.

Bonuses are awarded for various achievements whenever a level is completed. Examples are picking up all the missile weapons in a level, using all the healing items, or ending a level with minimal hit points lost.

=== Multiplayer ===
The multiplayer mode (called COMM-BAT in the game) allows up to eleven players simultaneously. Each can have separate uniform colors, but in team mode, teams are defined by uniform color.

There are nine multiplayer modes. These include a standard deathmatch mode, and the similar "Score More", which assigns different points depending on the weapon and way that a kill was done. Other modes consist of collecting or destroying as many triad symbols as possible. There are a few "tag" multiplayer modes, similar to the children's game, where a player must tag another player or moving symbols. There is also a "Hunter" mode, in which a "prey" player with no weapons has to be hunted by the rest, and a capture the flag mode. Options that can be set for a multiplayer game include player attributes, and whether or not health refills, missile weapons, or traps are spawned.

== Plot ==
A team of special operatives known as the HUNT (High-risk United Nations Task-force) is sent to San Nicolas Island to investigate deadly cult activity taking place in an ancient monastery. Their boat, the only way back, is destroyed by patrols, and the team soon learns that the cult plans to systematically destroy nearby Los Angeles. The operatives, now unable to return whence they came, are then left to fight their way into the monastery on the island and eventually put a stop to the cult's activities.

During its early stages of development, Rise of the Triad was initially meant to serve as the sequel to Wolfenstein 3D, titled Wolfenstein 3D II: Rise of the Triad. The presence of the Walther PP pistol, the MP 40 submachine gun, the bazooka, and the outfits worn by the enemies allude to Nazi Germany and imply the original aforementioned intent for the development of RotT.

== Development history ==
=== Original concept ===
Rise of the Triad began its life as a follow-up to Wolfenstein 3D (though it reportedly shares some similarities with director Tom Hall's "Doom Bible", which laid out Hall's conception of the video game Doom and even shares the name of one of the protagonists). The working titles of the game were Wolfenstein II and Wolfenstein 3D: Rise of the Triad. It was to use the same game engine code as Wolfenstein 3D, and have new levels, art, and characters. The artwork took around six months to do. As the game was getting into deeper development, project leader Scott Miller was contacted by John Romero, informing Miller that the project had been cancelled. Miller suspected that this was because id Software did not want to draw the spotlight away from the upcoming Doom. In order to keep as many of the numerous game assets the team had already created from going to waste, Tom Hall came up with a new storyline which still incorporated the Nazi themes seen in the Wolfenstein series, however they would ultimately depart from plotlines involving Nazis, with the final narrative concerning a cult apparently inspired by the Californian folk legend of the Dark Watchers or 'los vigilantes oscuros'.

According to the Apogee website, the original storyline was the following:

After the fall of Hitler, the true powers behind him have drawn into seclusion, planning their next strategy for world domination. Three large corporations guided Hitler as a puppet, and now plan the subjugation of the planet to their organization, the Triad. Their new plan: having developed nuclear weapons and new V-3 rockets to carry them, they plan to get a stranglehold on the world with the threat of Armageddon.

=== Engine ===
The engine is a highly modified version of the Wolfenstein 3D engine. The level design uses 90-degree walls and unvarying floor and ceiling heights in individual maps, limitations that are vestiges of the Wolfenstein 3D engine. However, the Rise of the Triad engine also includes features not possible with the original Wolfenstein 3D engine, such as elevation, panoramic skies, simulated dynamic lighting, fog, bullet holes, breakable glass walls, and level-over-level environments (made possible by "gravitational anomaly disks", suspended objects that collectively form stairs, floors, etc.). The engine also allows multiplayer networked or modem play, with many game modes . The level layouts were created with Tile Editor version 5 (TED5), which was also released with Extreme Rise of the Triad for users to customize their own maps.

=== Developers of Incredible Power ===
The team behind Rise of the Triad called itself The Developers of Incredible Power (DIP). Its name was created by Tom Hall, the lead designer of RotT. Other members of DIP included Mark Dochtermann, Jim Dosé, Steve Hornback, Chuck Jones, Nolan Martin, Tim Neveu, William Scarboro, Joseph Selinske, Susan Singer, and Marianna Vayntrub. Rise of the Triad was the only game released by DIP. A second game that was planned, Prey, never took off, but its title and parts of the original design were eventually recycled by Human Head Studios. The team was disbanded, and some of the members worked on the bestseller Duke Nukem 3D. Others started their own companies or left the computer games business. Scarboro died from an asthma attack in 2002.

=== Cut elements ===
Several planned elements were cut from the game, including female versions of certain enemies, like Low Guards, Strike Force soldiers, and the Overpatrol. Originally the game was going to load both sets of guards into memory, then determine randomly which to place at each appropriate point. This had the side effect of making memory requirements much higher than normal for the time, so in order to conserve performance, the alternate versions of the enemies were removed. Stills of the alternate enemies can be seen during the credits, as "actors who were cut from the game". Other cuts survived, like the ROTT Reject Level Pack (stages that were cut) and some artwork (some can be found on the CD). There is a motion capture session that was not used in the final game, but can be found online. The cut characters were restored for the game’s 2023 remaster.

== Release ==
=== Game releases ===
As with most Apogee games, the game was distributed as shareware. The shareware episode, which contains ten original levels, is titled Rise of the Triad: The HUNT Begins. This version has some limitations, including the ability to play only as Taradino Cassatt, and the availability of only four of the multiplayer modes. A "Deluxe Edition" of the shareware version, marketed in retail by LaserSoft, contains three extra levels, and three extra multiplayer levels that are not available on any other version.

There are several versions of the full or paid game, which includes three new episodes. The floppy disk and CD versions both contain 32 game levels for the three new episodes, with the CD version containing more multiplayer levels. The Site License version contains several multiplayer levels, and allows the game to be played in multiplayer mode in up to 11 different computers in a single network, without each requiring a different copy of the game.

In 2009, Rise of the Triad was released on GOG.com through DOSBox, making it compatible with Microsoft Windows, Linux, and macOS.

=== Expansion packs ===
On July 25, 1995, Apogee released a Reject Level Pack as freeware online. This pack is a collection of multiplayer maps deemed unsuitable for the original release. Some of these were serious attempts at levels (one even attempted to recreate a popular deathmatch level ((1-5) from Doom), and some were not (like one played inside the popular character Dopefish). The final level of the pack causes the game to crash intentionally.

An official retail add-on level pack was released by Apogee for ROTT entitled Extreme Rise of the Triad, also in 1995. The add-on was produced by two key members from the original team, Tom Hall and Joe Siegler. Generally the maps produced in this add-on are considerably harder than the original game's maps due to tricks that Hall and Siegler had learned in the editor since the release of the original. It also includes some user made level editors, a random level generator from Apogee, maps, and sound files. The levels were released as freeware on September 1, 2000. The remaining materials on the Extreme ROTT CD were released as freeware online as part of a "ROTT Goodies Pack" on February 15, 2005.

There are a few other level packs released from Apogee, including Lasersoft Deluxe Shareware Maps. They are identical to the released shareware packs, except that they include six exclusive levels. After Lasersoft went out of business, Apogee released these levels in October 1999.

Another is a level called "Wolf3D", which was done by Siegler as an exercise to see if he could replicate the level geography from Wolfenstein 3D in Rise of the Triad, as Rise of the Triad uses the same basic game engine. The level copies the complete level geography from Episode 1 Level 1 of Wolfenstein 3D. Some of the adjoining levels were added, but not completely.

The final release from Hall and Siegler was the "Ohio RTC" pack. This is a four level multiplayer pack which was designed for a group in Ohio that was holding a game tournament called 'BloodFest 96'. After the tournament was over, the pack was released online for everyone.

The final level to be released by anyone from the original team was one level done by Siegler called "You & Spray" (Spray was an internal nickname given to the NME boss character by the developers). This was done by Siegler as a gag in 1998, mostly as a personal exercise to see if he could remember how to still use the level editor. After mentioning its existence online, Siegler was cajoled into releasing it in November 2000. It was posted for download at the Rise of the Triad page on the Apogee website.

=== Source code ===
The source code to Rise of the Triad was released under the GNU GPL-2.0-or-later on 20 December 2002. Fans of the game ported it to AmigaOS, Linux, Mac OS, Xbox, Dreamcast, PlayStation Portable, Nintendo DS (homebrew) and 32-bit versions of Microsoft Windows. This has led to the game being included in the Fedora software repository, which downloads the free source port engine used as well as a free installer which downloads the shareware version's data.

=== Remaster ===
On September 6, 2020, during 3D Realms' "Realms Deep 2020" livestream, the game was shown running on Nintendo Switch and confirmed for modern platforms (Microsoft Windows, Nintendo Switch, PlayStation 4, and Xbox One) for a 2021 release. At Realms Deep 2022, this was re-announced as Rise of the Triad: Ludicrous Edition, developed by Nightdive Studios and co-published by Apogee Entertainment and New Blood Interactive. It was released on July 31, 2023 for Windows and September 29, 2023 for Nintendo Switch, PlayStation 4, and Xbox One, coinciding with the tenth anniversary of the 2013 remake. It features the option to toggle between the OPL and MIDI versions of the original soundtrack and the 2013 remake's soundtrack by Andrew Hulshult.

== Reception ==
Reception

Aggregate scores
| Aggregator | Score |
|---|---|
| GameRankings | 49% (iOS) |
| Metacritic | 49/100 (iOS) |

Review scores
| Publication | Score |
|---|---|
| Next Generation | 3/5 (PC) |
| Coming Soon Magazine | 90% (PC) |
| The DOS Spirit | 4/6 (PC) |
| HonestGamers | 4/10 (PC) |
| PC Team | 88% (PC) |
| PC Joker | 80% (PC) |

Scott Miller estimated that the game eventually sold around 110,000 copies.

A reviewer for Next Generation assessed that Rise of the Triad is an entertaining but ultimately undistinguished Doom replica which fails to rank with the best of the genre. Remarking that the game "has its own style but never strays far enough from the Doom herd to fully break free", he gave it three out of five stars.

A reviewer for Polish magazine Świat Gier Komputerowych described the game as a prominent example of the continuing popularity of Doom-style first-person shooters. The reviewer sees it as one of the closest successors to Doom, featuring fast-paced shooting across 32 single-player levels with a simple background story. He particularly appreciates the game for its audiovisual presentation, including detailed graphics, varied textures, animated enemies, destructible objects, environmental hazards, and atmospheric sound; and for its additional, innovative features such as looking up and down, magical weapons and power-ups, selectable characters with different abilities, and multiplayer modes—including modem and network play. However, the reviewer finds flaws with weak enemy AI, awkward map design, poorly marked secret passages, and gameplay that often devolves into repetitive shooting. Despite these flaws, the reviewer concludes that the game is engaging and worth playing for fans of the genre, awarding it a score of 85%.

The iOS version was not very well received and has Metacritic and GameRankings scores of respectively 49/100 and 49.00%.

== Remake ==
In 2009, Scott Miller said that Rise of the Triad would be remade. Gameplay footage of the new Rise of the Triad was revealed at QuakeCon 2012. The game was designed by Frederik Schreiber and his company Interceptor Entertainment and was released on July 31, 2013, through Steam and GOG.com.
