= Twisted Tower =

2026 video game

- Developer: Atmos Games
- Publisher: 3D Realms
- Composers: Quinten Coblentz; Thomas Brush; Matt Rexford
- Platform: Microsoft Windows
- Release: August 18, 2026
- Genres: First-person shooter Action adventure
- Mode: Single-player

Twisted Tower is a 2026 first-person shooter and action-adventure game developed by Thomas Brush's independent studio Atmos Games and published by 3D Realms. The game combines first-person shooting, exploration, and platforming. Brush described Twisted Tower as being influenced by BioShock.

== Synopsis ==
Set within the 1950s, Vincent Cameron gets an ominous call that the mad filmmaker V.C. Twister had kidnapped his fiancée Charlotte Wright and taken her hostage at his abandoned theme park resort called "The Twisted Tower", inspired by his successful film and other projects. This sudden revelation leads Vincent to go to the theme park and traverse through the many floors of the tower in order to save Charlotte before its too late.

== Gameplay ==
Twisted Tower is a single-player first-person action-adventure with horror elements. In the game, the player progresses upward through an abandoned amusement resort divided into five principal areas: a hotel, waterpark, clown-themed casino, carnival forest and space station. As players explore the tower, they'll encounter vending machines where they can spend collected tickets on weapon upgrades. Upgrades include alt-fire modes, damage boosts, and ammo capacity boosts.

== Development and release ==
Twisted Tower was developed by Atmos Games, the independent studio founded by Thomas Brush, who previously developed Pinstripe and Neversong. Development lasted approximately five years and marked a transition for Brush from his previous predominantly two dimensional games to a three dimensional first-person game.

The project changed substantially during development. Brush stated that the developers discarded and recreated much of the game's assets multiple times before settling on its final direction. 3D Realms announced in September 2023 that it had partnered with Brush and Atmos Games to publish the game.

The game received a full release on Steam on August 18, 2026.

== Reception ==
Reception

Aggregate scores
Aggregator	Score
Metacritic	75/100
OpenCritic	91% recommend (Note: Based on 23 reviews)

Twisted Tower received generally favorable reviews from critics, according to the review aggregation website Metacritic. Fellow review aggregator OpenCritic assessed that the game received strong approval, being recommended by 91% of critics.
