= Realm of Chaos =

Realm of Chaos may refer to:

- Realm of Chaos (album), or Realm of Chaos: Slaves to Darkness, a 1989 album by Bolt Thrower
- Realm of Chaos (Warhammer), two books for the Warhammer Fantasy Roleplay, Warhammer Fantasy Battle and Warhammer 40,000 games
  - Realm of Chaos: Slaves to Darkness
- Realms of Chaos (video game), 1995
