= Gateworld (video game) =

1993 video game

Gateworld: The Home Planet
- Developer: Homebrew Software
- Publisher: Homebrew Software
- Designers: Ken Rogoway; Dave Farquharson
- Programmers: Ken Rogoway; Dave Farquharson
- Artists: Edge Creations; Softscene
- Composer: Prosonus
- Platform: MS-DOS
- Release: 1993
- Genre: Platform
- Mode: Single-player

Gateworld: The Home Planet is a platform game developed and published by Homebrew Software. It was released in 1993 for MS-DOS using the Apogee model: there are three episodes of 12 levels each, and the first is distributed as shareware. The game was originally developed by Apogee before being cancelled and continued by Homebrew.

== Plot ==
The space explorer Captain Buzz Klondike travels in his artificially intelligent ship Stella, who stumbles on an asteroid with some valuable mineral deposits. As Klondike ventures deeper into the asteroid, he realises the asteroid was sent from the planet of Gateworld, where trouble runs amok.

== Gameplay ==
Each episode is divided into three acts. Each act has three normal levels and a boss level. The player's goal is to get Klondike through the levels, by finding the gate teleporter key and accessing the gate teleporter to proceed. Bosses in boss levels are indestructible, so the player must avoid them. To finish the final boss level of an episode, the player must destroy the base machine to get the final gate teleporter key.

Klondike is able to fire his weapon straight or diagonally up or down. Some enemies are harmless, but obstructive while others cause Klondike damage on impact or with projectiles. Traps are also present throughout the levels. Canisters can be picked up for health, stars can be picked up for powerups (or the occasional harmful stars) and guns can be picked up for ammunition.

== Development ==
The game was under development by Apogee Software in 1991, but the quality was deemed poor and the project was cancelled in 1992, then replaced with Major Stryker. Homebrew Software took over the project, and it became the company's first release. Homebrew planned to port the game to Windows by 2001, but the port was never released.
