= Secret Agent (video game) =

1992 video game

- Developer: Apogee Software
- Publisher: Apogee Software
- Programmer: Peder Jungck
- Artists: George Broussard; Jim Norwood
- Engine: Crystal Caves
- Platform: MS-DOS
- Release: February 1, 1992
- Genre: Platform
- Mode: Single-player

Secret Agent (also known as Secret Agent Man) is a side-scrolling platform game developed and published by Apogee Software. The first episode is shareware, while the remaining two are sold directly by the publisher. Secret Agent uses the same game engine as the earlier Crystal Caves.

== Plot ==
Agent 006½ is one of the top agents for the Bureau. The Diabolical Villain Society – or D.V.S. – has stolen the blueprints to an orbital ruby laser weapon, code-named "Red Rock Rover". The blueprints have been secured at three island strongholds of D.V.S. Agent 006½'s current mission: recover the blueprints. Each island stronghold contains 15 radar installations. All fifteen must be taken down before Agent 006½ can make his way into the D.V.S. fortress on the island, where the blueprints are held.

Mission 1: The Hunt for Red Rock Rover: The first island stronghold. Agent 006½ parachutes in, and after a successful mission, takes a hidden boat to the second island.

Mission 2: Kill Again Island: The second island stronghold. After a successful mission, Agent 006½ slips away in scuba gear.

Mission 3: Dr. No Body: The third island stronghold, where Agent 006½ will have to do battle with Dr. No Body, the head of the D.V.S.

== Gameplay ==
Screenshot

The player controls the titular secret agent, known only under his codename "Agent 006½". Each game is divided into 16 levels; there is no fixed order in which to play them, but the "main fortress" cannot be accessed until the other 15 levels have all been completed.

Each level is a labyrinthine structure. The objective in each level is to locate and destroy a radar dish, then exit the level. A bundle of dynamite is needed to blow open the exit doors. Agent 006½ is hindered by locked doors and laser beams that require key-card access to be opened and deactivated by bringing a floppy disk to a computer terminal. There are additional robotic and human enemies with environmental hazards such as spikes and acid pools that the player must traverse. Agent 006½ begins a level with three health points. If he loses all three, he dies, and the level restarts, with the player's score reset to what it was when beginning the level. Enemies and specific hazards detract one health point when they hit Agent 006½, while others (such as landmines) kill him instantly.

The player may need to make use of pushable barrels to reach higher areas. Some of the levels also contain special goggles, which, when collected, cause several platforms to become visible, allowing access to previously unreachable areas.

Power-ups include ammunition, sneakers that increase Agent 006½'s speed for a short duration, and a gun that allows faster shooting. There are also items that merely give points. When a human enemy is killed, he is replaced by a gravestone; the player can either destroy it (earning 100 points) or pay their respects (earning 1,000 points). Each level also includes the letters "S", "P" and "Y". The player is awarded 10,000 points if they pick them up in the correct order and 25,000 points if they complete the level without taking any damage. There are also items that cause ailments, like a ½ item that slows Agent 006½'s speed for a short duration and a question mark that reverses the function of the left and right keys for a short duration.

The names of the episodes are references to popular movies and television shows: "The Hunt for Red Rock Rover" is a pun on the film The Hunt for Red October, "Kill Again Island" is a play on Gilligan's Island and "Dr. No Body" is a reference to the film Dr. No. The default high score list consists of popular fictional spies such as Jim Phelps and Maxwell Smart.

== Release and legacy ==
Secret Agent was intended for release on October 1, 1991, but was delayed and ended up by being released exactly four months later. GOG.com released an emulated version for Windows and Mac OS X in 2013. A high-definition remaster was released on June 30, 2021, for Windows and Linux by Emberheart Games with Apogee Entertainment, the new name for Apogee, as publisher. The game adds a fourth mission to the existing three. It also adds Steam Workshop support, online leaderboards and a new soundtrack.
