= Cosmo's Cosmic Adventure =

1992 video game

- Developer(s): Apogee Software
- Publisher(s): Apogee Software
- Producer(s): Scott Miller
- Designer(s): Todd Replogle; Allen Blum III
- Artist(s): Stephen Hornback
- Composer(s): Robert Prince
- Platform(s): MS-DOS
- Release: March 1992
- Genre(s): Platform
- Mode(s): Single-player

Cosmo's Cosmic Adventure: Forbidden Planet is a video game programmed by Todd Replogle and published by Apogee Software. It is a two-dimensional side-scrolling platform game. The game was released in mid March 1992 for MS-DOS compatible systems.

== Gameplay ==
Typical gameplay shot

The player controls Cosmo, and the objective is to reach the exit of each level. Cosmo can walk and jump, and can hang onto most walls with his suction-cup hands. Combining the hanging and jumps allows Cosmo to climb to higher places. There are some interactive objects, including pushable ceiling buttons, teleporters, and springs that make Cosmo jump higher. There are also hovercraft (floating pads that allow Cosmo to fly) and hint globes (which cause a message to be displayed if Cosmo runs into one; destroying one with a bomb earns 12,800 points). The player has access to bonus levels after each level if enough stars are collected.

Cosmo has a health meter with three units. Each time an enemy or hazard damages Cosmo, he loses one unit of health. If he takes further damage after losing all health units, or falls off a chasm, the player restarts the level. Cosmo has unlimited lives. There are power-up modules that restore one health unit each. There are also two hidden cheeseburgers in each episode. Picking one up earns Cosmo an additional empty health unit, allowing Cosmo's health meter to reach a maximum of five units. Enemies hurt Cosmo by touching him or firing projectiles at him. Cosmo can kill many of them by jumping on them. Bombs can also be collected and used to destroy enemies. Cosmo can carry at most 9 bombs at a time. After Cosmo drops a bomb, it takes a few seconds to explode, and it can hurt Cosmo if he is too close. Bombs can also be used to destroy other objects and hazards. Shield cubes, once collected, provide a temporary invincibility shield for Cosmo.

== Plot ==
The storyline is about a little alien boy named Cosmo, whose parents are taking him to Walt Disney World for his birthday. A comet hits their ship, forcing them to land on an unknown planet (called Zonk in WIP) and repair the ship. Cosmo goes exploring, and when he returns, his parents are missing. Seeing large footprints, Cosmo thinks that his parents have been captured and sets off to rescue them before they are eaten. There are three episodes in the game series in which Cosmo must navigate through 10 alien-themed levels for each episode.

At the end of the first episode, Cosmo unexpectedly gets swallowed by a large creature. The story continues in the second episode, where Cosmo ends up in the creature's body and has to find a way out. At the end of the second episode, Cosmo finds the city where he thinks his parents might have been taken. In the final episode, Cosmo finds his parents (who were in no danger of being eaten the whole time) and has a great time at Disney World for his birthday.

== Development ==
The game's working titles were "The Adventures of Zonk" and "Cosmo Kid from Space", but Stephen Hornback ultimately gave it the final name. It was developed by two people in seven months.

Cosmo uses 16-color EGA graphics at 320×200 screen resolution. The game uses three-layer, horizontal, parallax scrolling. A file contained with the shareware version of the game urged people not to download it if their computers could not handle it. The game was written with 24,500 lines of code. The game supports AdLib music, but sound effects are generated by the PC speaker.

== Reception ==
Computer Gaming World stated that Cosmo's Cosmic Adventure was "especially playable and extremely addicting", and that fans of Commander Keen and side-scrolling platform games "will find Cosmo much to their liking ... hours of pleasure without excessive destruction". The game was reviewed in 1993 in Dragon #197 by Sandy Petersen in the first "Eye of the Monitor" column. Petersen gave the game 2 out of 5 stars.
