= Realms of Chaos (video game) =

1995 video game

- Developer(s): Apogee Software
- Publisher(s): Apogee Software
- Programmer(s): Keith Schuler
- Composer(s): Robert Prince
- Engine: FAST
- Platform(s): MS-DOS
- Release: November 11, 1995 (shareware); November 27, 1995 (full)
- Genre(s): Platform
- Mode(s): Single-player

Realms of Chaos is a platform game for MS-DOS, published by Apogee Software as shareware in November 1995, with the full version released later that month. The game was authored by Keith Schuler, who had previously designed Paganitzu, and was originally to be a sequel entitled Alabama Smith and the Bloodfire Pendant. It is still sold by Apogee. Like previous platform Apogee games, this one utilized the FAST engine. The game was re-released in 2013 on GOG.com with support for Windows, macOS, and Linux.

== Gameplay ==
The first level

The gameplay of Realms of Chaos was like the standard action platformer commonly found on consoles. At any time the player can switch between two siblings, a warrior called Endrick and a sorceress named Elandra, depending on which character is better suited to the particular situation. It consists of three episodes, with only the first episode playable in the shareware version.

== Reception ==
Ole Albers from German magazine PC Joker gave it a score of 54%. A review in Power Unlimited, on the other hand, was much more positive and rewarded the game with an 8 out of 10.
