= Alien Carnage =

1993 video game

- Developer: Interactive Binary Illusions/SubZero Software
- Publisher: Apogee Software
- Designers: John Passfield; Robert Crane
- Artist: Steven Stamatiadis
- Composers: Stephen Baker; George Stamatiadis; Neil Voss
- Platforms: MS-DOS, Windows
- Release: October 10, 1993 (HH); November 2, 1994 (AC); 1996 (ZW)
- Genre: Side-scrolling platform game
- Mode: Single-player

Alien Carnage, originally released as Halloween Harry, is a side-scrolling platform game developed by Interactive Binary Illusions and SubZero Software, and distributed by Apogee Software. The game features 256-colour VGA graphics and background music in MOD format. Alien Carnage is composed of four episodes. The first episode was released as shareware, and the rest were distributed commercially. In May 2007, John Passfield and 3D Realms released Alien Carnage as freeware. In 2014, the game was re-released with Windows support.

== Plot ==
The cartoon-style game features agent Halloween Harry, who has to save the world from aliens that want to take control of Earth by turning its population into green-skinned zombies. Some of the enemies reference Aliens, Gremlins, and Elvis Presley. Harry is helped by controller Diane, who gives him information via a video link.

== Gameplay ==
Alien Carnage screenshot

In the game, the player has to shoot zombies and aliens with his flamethrower and other weapons, rescuing hostages along the way. Instead of jumping, Harry uses a jetpack to reach higher platforms. His jetpack shares ammo with his flamethrower, which means it is best for the player to use both sparingly. Harry can drink and eat junk food to gain health (rescuing hostages also restores Harry to full health), and upgrade to different kinds of ammo by using ammo dispensers. The player needs to collect coins dropped by killed enemies to buy this ammo. They can also pick up other power-ups with various effects, including a wrapped gift (additional ammo for Harry's current weapon), a money bag (30 additional credits; coins dropped by enemies are worth 5 credits each), and a 1-up icon (an extra life, plus full health). The game progress can be saved through the use of computer terminals scattered across the levels. To advance to the next level, Harry needs to rescue all the hostages, then use the elevator.

== Development ==

Alien Carnage was originally titled Halloween Harry, and was released under this title for its first two versions. It was a remake of a 1985 game with the same name by John Passfield for the Australian Microbee computer system; inspired by Ghostbusters (1984), he created a "haunted house platform game" in six weeks featuring a "ghost hunter searching a haunted house for a malevolent witch" and submitted it to a local publisher, earning a small amount of money.

Several years later, a friend suggested that they start a company and make a new version of Halloween Harry. After an initial prototype for Amiga computers, collaboration with programmers Rob Crane and Tony Ball led to a PC version, now very different from the 1985 game. The game was published locally through Manaccom, which contracted with Apogee Software for non-Australian sales. Apogee suggested to the developers that the title should be changed because it might be viewed as a seasonal Halloween-themed game, limiting sales during the rest of the year. They renamed it to Alien Carnage, and was re-released as "Alien Carnage v1.0" in 1994. Along with the name change, missions one and three were switched, and with Apogee's shareware model, the first half of the game could be played for free to drive interest in purchasing the second half.

== Reception and legacy ==
Alien Carnage sold well upon release; Passfield later recalled that the game was at the top of the shareware games sales charts for its first month, before being overwhelmed by the release of Doom, which suppressed the sales of non-3D games.

In 1996, a sequel titled Zombie Wars was released. This game takes place three years after the original story. The aliens return to Earth to try to enslave its population. Harry and Diane, who has been promoted to field agent and is now also a playable character, have to save the world again. A number of other friendly characters have been added as NPCs.

Gee-Whiz Entertainment (formerly Interactive Binary Illusions) made plans for an animated cartoon based on the third, future Alien Carnage game. The cartoon was to include Harry and Diane, the NPCs, as well as probably recurring alien and zombie characters. The script was roughly based on the script for Zombie Wars, but both the game and the cartoon were never made.
