= Wacky Wheels =

1994 video game

- Developer: Beavis Soft
- Publisher: Apogee Software
- Designers: Andy Edwardson; Shaun Gadalla
- Artist: Shaun Gadalla
- Composer: Mark Klem
- Platforms: MS-DOS, Windows, Mac OS, Linux
- Release: October 17, 1994
- Genre: Racing
- Modes: Single-player, multiplayer

Wacky Wheels is a kart racing video game released by Apogee Software for MS-DOS in 1994. The game strongly resembles Super Mario Kart from the Super NES, but the karts are described as lawn mowers and the eight playable characters (panda, moose, pelican, raccoon, shark, camel, elephant and tiger) are animals from a zoo.

The game was re-released on GOG.com with support for Microsoft Windows, Linux, and macOS on August 20, 2014, then for Steam on May 6, 2015 as part of the 3D Realms Anthology.

== Gameplay ==
While racing, players can collect hedgehogs, bombs and other objects that can be used to shoot or distract opponents. The game features both single and multiplayer play, with split-screen, modem, or direct serial link. In multiplayer mode, two human players can either race against each other or battle in special arenas where the sole purpose is to hit the opponent a certain number of times with hedgehogs. This last gaming mode, called Wacky shoot-out, is similar to the classic deathmatch mode from first-person shooter games or the Battle Mode of Super Mario Kart.

The game was and still is distributed as shareware, with only a few characters and courses active. Registration is required to unlock the remaining characters and courses. It is also the first game to feature a Dopefish cameo appearance.

== Development ==
Developers Andy Edwardson and Shaun Gadalla of Wacky Wheels were inspired by Super Mario Kart, and wished to create a similar experience on the personal computer. During development, he sent out a playable demo that included its source code to Copysoft to canvas interest in funding the project. They rejected it and instead Apogee began funding development. However, just prior to the release of Wacky Wheels, Copysoft released a similar game titled Skunny Kart. Edwardson and Gadalla accused Copysoft of copyright infringement, noting the similarity in the games, but no legal action was ever taken.

== Sequel ==
In 2014 Cascadia Games acquired the rights to Wacky Wheels from Apogee and was working on a sequel/remake of the game. The game called Wacky Wheels HD was released on Steam and Itch.io in Fall 2016. It was later withdrawn from Steam, and is no longer available there. The Itch.io release was made free to download.
