= Rise of the Triad (2013 video game) =

- Developer: Interceptor Entertainment
- Publisher: Apogee Software, LLC
- Directors: Frederik Schreiber; Terry Nagy; Dave Oshry
- Producers: Khaled Ibrahimi; Leon Zawada; Daniel Hedjazi
- Designers: Frederik Schreiber; Daniel Hedjazi
- Programmer: Zach Ellsbury
- Artists: Arturo Pahua; Chris Pollitt; Nick Quackenbush; Yaniv Dekel
- Composer: Andrew Hulshult
- Engine: Unreal Engine 3
- Platform: Microsoft Windows
- Release: 31 July 2013
- Genre: First-person shooter
- Modes: Single-player, multiplayer

Rise of the Triad is a first-person shooter developed by Interceptor Entertainment and published by Apogee Software, LLC for Microsoft Windows in 2013. The game is a reboot of the original Rise of the Triad published by the former Apogee Software in 1995.

== Gameplay ==
The gameplay has been touted as a throwback to classic first-person shooters of the 1990s such as the original Rise of the Triad. It features non-linear level design, a high rate of player movespeed, multiple playable characters and an arsenal of over the top explosive weaponry recreated from the original game. The game consists of 20 levels (plus four secret levels) spread across four episodes as well as an online multiplayer component which features Deathmatch, Team Deathmatch and Capture the Flag game modes.

== Plot ==
The plot is nearly identical to that of the original Rise of the Triad wherein a team of special operatives, known as the H.U.N.T. (High-risk United Nations Task-force) is sent to San Nicolas Island to investigate terrorist activity taking place. When their boat is destroyed by patrols, the team soon learns that the 'Triad' cult plans to nuke nearby Los Angeles. The operatives, now unable to return from whence they came, are left to fight their way into the heart of the island to put a stop to the Triad's activities once and for all.

== Development ==
Development of Rise of the Triad began in January 2012. Originally planned as an HD remake, Slipgate Studios instead decided to assemble a global virtual team to begin a full re-imagining of the original. The game's producer Leon Zawada had previously worked on a pseudo-sequel fan game called Return of the Triad for the ZDoom engine. The game was revealed for the first time at QuakeCon 2012 and released one year later at QuakeCon 2013. It is said development was completed on an extremely tight budget and that much of said budget went toward acquiring licenses for Rise of the Triad IP and Epic Games' Unreal Engine 3.

== Reception ==
Reception

Aggregate score
Aggregator	Score
Metacritic	67/100

Review scores
Publication	Score
Destructoid	8.5/10
GameSpot	5.5/10
GamesRadar+	3/5
GameTrailers	6.2/10
GameZone	8/10
IGN	4.3/10
Joystiq	3/5
PC Gamer (UK)	74%
PC PowerPlay	9/10
Polygon	7/10
Metro	5/10

Rise of the Triad received "average" reviews according to the review aggregation website Metacritic. PC Gamer UK commented: "Everything that you loved and hated about the 1994 original—ludicrous gibs, explosives, boss fights, and first-person platforming." IGN: "It's a relic from the early age of shooters that, while authentic, is so entrenched in outdated design and mechanics that it's more frustrating than it is fun." Destructoid: "It stays true to the original with its design philosophy and retention of some of the original assets, but it also brings modern conveniences to the forefront without all the pay to win or over-saturated downloadable content nonsense."
