= Neversong =

- Developers: Atmos Games; Serenity Forge
- Publisher: Serenity Forge
- Designer: Thomas Brush
- Artist: Thomas Brush
- Composer: Thomas Brush
- Engine: Unity
- Platforms: iOS, macOS, Linux, Windows, Nintendo Switch, PlayStation 4, Xbox One
- Release: iOS, macOS: WW: 1 May 2020; Linux, Windows: WW: 20 May 2020; PlayStation 4: NA: October 31, 2019; EU: July 16, 2020
- Genres: Adventure, Action, RPG
- Mode: Single-player

Neversong, formerly Once Upon a Coma, is a psychological adventure game developed by American indie studios Atmos Games and Serenity Forge. The game is a sequel to Thomas Brush's flash game Coma, and was initially aimed for release on Microsoft Windows and Nintendo Switch in September 2018, and for PlayStation 4 and Xbox One in early 2019. However, creator Thomas Brush pushed back both dates to 2019 so he could perfect the game to meet expectations after Pinstripe.

The game will follow Peet who wakes from a strange coma and discovers things are not exactly as they were. Children have overrun his hometown and all adults have vanished.

== Development ==
A campaign for the game was held through Kickstarter with a funding goal of $25,000. The project ended raising $85,000, tripling its original goal.

== Reception ==
Upon release, Neversong received mixed reviews by users and critics. Although the game being centered around story and narrative, it was criticized for its lack of gameplay mechanics and short runtime. The full Neversong experience clocks in at around five hours. In Forbes' review of the game, praise was given to the game's payoff and ending, while noting the title would not appeal to everyone.

Neversong received "mixed or average" reviews according to review aggregator Metacritic.

Reception

Aggregate score
Aggregator	Score
Metacritic	PC: 75/100; NS: 78/100; PS4: 73/100

Review score
Publication	Score
TouchArcade	5/5

== See also ==
- Pinstripe
