= Gentlemen! =

2013 video game

- Developer: Lucky Frame
- Publisher: Lucky Frame
- Platforms: iOS, Ouya, Windows, OS X, Linux
- Release: iOS; July 16, 2013; Ouya; August 27, 2013; Windows, OS X November 5, 2013; Linux; November 13, 2013
- Genre: Platform
- Mode: Multiplayer

Gentlemen! is a platform game developed and published by Lucky Frame for iOS, Ouya, Windows, OS X, and Linux in 2013.

== Development ==
Initially, there was to be a single-player mode to Gentlemen! but this was decided against, since the game was built entirely around being multiplayer and any single player mode "would have been superfluous and probably not very fun."

== Reception ==
Reception

Aggregate score
| Aggregator | Score |
|---|---|
| Metacritic | 82/100 |

Review scores
| Publication | Score |
|---|---|
| Edge | 8/10 |
| Eurogamer | 7/10 |
| Gamezebo | 3.5/5 |
| Pocket Gamer | 4.5/5 |
| TouchArcade | 4.5/5 |

The iOS version received "favorable" reviews, according to the review aggregation website Metacritic.

However, in August 2013, Gentlemen! sold 1,114 copies on iPad, and 144 copies on Android, which was below the desired amount of 2000 copies. The main reasons were attributed to a pop song known as "Gentleman", the discovery feature not favoring Gentlemen! and video game piracy from people primarily living in Russia and China (predominantly China).
