= Pinstripe (video game) =

2017 video game

- Developer: Atmos Games
- Publishers: Armor Games; Serenity Forge (NS)
- Designer: Thomas Brush
- Programmer: Thomas Brush
- Artist: Thomas Brush
- Writer: Thomas Brush
- Composer: Thomas Brush
- Engine: Unity
- Platforms: Linux, macOS, Windows, Xbox One, PlayStation 4, Nintendo Switch, iOS
- Release: Linux, macOS, Windows; April 25, 2017; Xbox One; February 7, 2018; PlayStation 4; February 13, 2018; Nintendo Switch; October 25, 2018; iOS; October 15, 2021
- Genres: Puzzle, adventure
- Mode: Single-player

Pinstripe is a puzzle adventure video game developed by Thomas Brush, who created and designed it over a five-year period and was published by Armor Games. It was released in April 2017 for Linux, macOS, and Windows, in February 2018 for Xbox One and PlayStation 4, Nintendo Switch in October 2018, and for iOS in October 2021.

== Plot ==
Pinstripe follows Teddy, a disgraced ex-minister, who is on a train with his three-year-old daughter, Bo. Ted encounters Pinstripe, a shadowy figure who is also on the train. After Bo is kidnapped by Pinstripe, and the train crashes into a town, Ted goes off to find Bo.

Exploring the town, Ted finds his dog, George, who gives him advice throughout the game, and Bo's slingshot, which acts as a weapon. Throughout the town, the residents are drunk off of Sack Juice, which Pinstripe produces.

Near the end of the game, clues collected by Ted imply that after his wife died, Ted began to drink, and soon after crashed his car, killing him and Bo, and also finds that Pinstripe is the name of the whisky he drank. Owning up to his mistakes, he faces off against Pinstripe, who wants to adopt Bo to take her away from Ted. After defeating Pinstripe, Ted enters a dark room, and George sacrifices himself to let Ted pass. The ending sees that Ted is reunited with Bo in a sunny field. Dialogue options earlier in the game decide if George is reunited with Ted and Bo. They come across a woman on a bench, presumed to be Bo's mother. The game then ends.

== Development ==
Pinstripe was the third game created by Thomas Brush. He had been working on the game for four years, and it was originally slated for release on Steam and iOS in 2016. On February 16, 2016, a Kickstarter was launched so Brush could quit his full-time job and focus on development, with a goal of $28,000. The project exceeded its funding goal by nearly $15,000 within two days, and in total, it raised $106,000, funding stretch goals that include a bonus level, voice acting and an extra mode. Brush created every aspect of the game himself, including the original score, artwork, programming, and writing, though several people did lend their voices to the game for various characters. The game finally released on April 25, 2017, and was localized into seven different languages.

In his development postmortem for the game at Gamasutra, Brush credits Unity as being easy to learn and supported by plugins which were invaluable to his development. He warned others against using UnityScript, due to its excessive compilation time, and instead to use C#.

== Reception ==
Reception

Aggregate score
Aggregator	Score
Metacritic	PC: 71/100; XONE: 75/100; NS: 77/100

Review scores
Publication	Score
4Players	PS4: 83/100
Destructoid	XONE: 7.5/10
GameSpot	PC: 5/10
Nintendo Life	NS: 8/10
Official Xbox Magazine (UK)	XONE: 6/10
Time	PC: 5/5

In 2016, Pinstripe was a finalist at the third SXSW Gaming Awards under the category 'Gamer's Voice Award (single player)'. Upon its release, the reviews were mixed. Jeremy Winslow, writing at GameSpot awarded the game 5/10, criticising the narrative as pedestrian, and "failing to inspire emotional attachment in [its] characters". For Winslow, this, and flaws in its puzzle design, combat and platforming overpowered the game's rich atmosphere. At Time, Matt Peckham was much more positive, awarding the game 5/5. Peckham described the game's depiction of hell as "a melange of beauty and horror" and compared it to the works of Bosch, Bruegel and Dante. He concluded the review by reflecting on the themes raised by the game, "What does loss resemble? How does it sound? What if the museums to mistakes that we spend lifetimes assembling in our minds were a physical space?" Nintendo Life gave the game an 8/10 and called it "a beautiful creation in every sense of the word" but "a little on the short side". Writing for The Washington Post, Harold Goldberg stated: "While Pinstripe can feel uneven at times, there's talent, full-of-heart here that's worthy of nurturing."
