= Crystal Caves =

1991 video game

- CD cover art
- Developer(s): Apogee Software
- Publisher(s): Apogee Software
- Designer(s): Frank Maddin
- Artist(s): Frank Maddin; Lucinda Maddin; George Broussard
- Platform(s): MS-DOS
- Release: October 23, 1991
- Genre(s): Platform
- Mode(s): Single-player

Crystal Caves is a side-scrolling platform game developed and published by Apogee Software for IBM PC compatibles. The game is divided into three episodes with the first distributed as shareware and the other two available for purchase. Designer Frank Maddin said the method worked "pretty well" for the time. Crystal Caves was inspired by the 1982 game Miner 2049er for Atari 8-bit computers.

== Plot ==
Mylo Steamwitz is a down-on-the-luck space trader. Each game in the series follows Mylo going to the planet Altair to collect enough crystals from its mines to finance his latest get-rich-quick scheme.

=== Volume 1: Troubles with Twibbles ===
Twibbles are the hottest new pet in the galaxy, so Mylo hopes to earn enough crystals to buy a twibble farm. He succeeds and buys his farm, but twibbles breed so quickly that the market is soon over-saturated, and Mylo is stuck with a planet overrun with twibbles.

=== Volume 2: Slugging It Out ===
After selling his twibble farm for a loss, Mylo heads back to Altair. A recent war has created a demand for medicinal slugs, so now Mylo wants to buy a slug farm. He collects enough crystals to do so, and for a while, business is booming, but the slugs soon burrow their way into an abandoned salt mine and perish, depriving Mylo of his stock.

=== Volume 3: Mylo Versus the Supernova ===
A late-night infomercial inspires Mylo to quit farming and try his hand at real estate. He collects enough crystals to buy an entire planetary system from Rip Eweoff. Mylo plans to turn the system into a vacation resort: tropical getaways on the inner planets, ski slopes on the outer planets, and luxury hotels in the middle. However, mere minutes after he buys the planetary system, the star goes supernova, destroying the system. As Mylo looks at the nebula where the system once was, he comes up with an idea. He builds a restaurant overlooking the nebula. Thanks to its spectacular view of the nebula, the restaurant becomes the hottest spot in the galaxy, and Mylo finally makes his millions.

== Gameplay ==
Gameplay screenshot

The game begins in a main level containing the entrances to 16 caves. To complete the game, Mylo must collect all the crystals in all the caves. Mylo can complete the caves in whichever order he chooses. Mylo can quit a cave at any time, but in doing so, will negate all progress he made in that level.

Each cave consists of some simple puzzles to solve. Pulling a lever will open the door of a corresponding colour. There will also be switches that Mylo can use to activate and deactivate obstacles.

Mylo is armed with a rocket gun to destroy enemies and obstacles. Mylo begins the game with five rockets, but can collect more as the game goes on. There are many other power-ups to help Mylo:

- P-Pill – supercharges Mylo's gun so it can destroy all enemies with a single shot.
- G-Pill – reverses gravity, allowing Mylo to walk on the ceiling.
- Stop Signs – freeze all enemies on the screen, allowing Mylo to sneak past them.

Mylo begins each level with three hit points. If all hit points are lost, the player goes back to the start of the level. If a level is finished with all hit points, the player gets a bonus score of $50,000.

== Development ==
Crystal Caves was inspired by Miner 2049er. The main character's name, "Mylo Steamwitz", was coined by George Broussard and was meant to sound like a loser's name. Most graphics were created by Frank Maddin.

Development on Crystal Caves began back when George Broussard was still releasing games under the name Micro F/X. A few months into the development (when about 50–70% of the game was complete) Broussard joined Apogee and Crystal Caves became an Apogee product. It was originally going to be released on September 5, 1991 but was delayed for a month.

In October 2005, 3D Realms (formerly Apogee) released a maintenance patch to fix a bug in the game which set the player's computer's clock backwards 100 years after playing on Windows XP.

== Legacy ==
GOG.com released an emulated version for Windows, Linux and Mac OS X in 2014.

An authorized remake by Emberheart Games was released in October 2020 for Windows and Linux. It features remade graphics, a new episode, new enemies, and an online leaderboard.
