= Monster Bash =

1993 video game

- Developer: Apogee Software
- Publisher: Apogee Software
- Designer: Frank Maddin
- Engine: F.A.S.T. Game System
- Platform: DOS
- Release: April 9, 1993
- Genre: Platform
- Mode: Single-player

Monster Bash (called Graveyard during development) is a side-scrolling platform game developed and published by Apogee Software for DOS. The game features 16-color EGA graphics and IMF AdLib compatible music. It was developed by Frank Maddin and Gerald Lindsly.

The game is divided into three episodes. The first episode of the game is available to download under a shareware license, but the two remaining parts of the game must be purchased. The registered game also removes advertisements and reminders of the benefits of purchasing the games from the first episode and enables cheat code functionality.

The game was re-released in 2014 on GOG.com with support for Windows, macOS, and Linux. In 2021, a remaster of the game developed by Emberheart Games titled 'Monster Bash HD' was released on Steam and GOG.com.

== Plot ==
The player controls Johnny Dash, whose pet dog Tex was captured by the game's main villain, Count Chuck. Aided by the friendly Bed Monster and Frank Lloyd Rat, Johnny enters the Underworld armed with a slingshot and an infinite supply of rocks to slay Count Chuck and his minions and rescue his beloved Tex, as well as many more captured pets.

== Gameplay ==
Johnny fighting a zombie

Johnny must work his way through a total of 28 horror-themed levels. Throughout the levels, Johnny can collect candy for points, interact with objects and pickup various powerups. The three difficulty modes determine how many health points Johnny has. Any monster, enemy projectile or hazard that Johnny touches will deduct a health point from him. Health is replenished by collecting a heart. Certain hazards and deadly terrain will instantly kill Johnny and take a life away. Up to five lives can be regained by collecting a voodoo doll or earning 20,000 points. If all lives are lost, the game is over.

In each level the player has to release all pets from their cages, before making it to the exit to proceed to the next level. When entering a new level, all powerups are removed and Johnny's health is fully replenished. The player comes across various inanimate objects which they must interact with in order to complete the level. These include furniture that springs Johnny into the air, deployable ladders and flying broomsticks. At one point in each episode, Johnny will face his "Nemesis", a doppelganger of himself as a minor boss. At the end of an episode, the player must defeat a boss monster.

Johnny has an unlimited supply of rocks, and he can fire his slingshot either forward or diagonally up. Rocks move in a realistic projectile-like pattern, and can bounce off walls and other objects. As well as killing enemies, the player can also use the slingshot to position objects. The player can collect powerups for the slingshot that allow Johnny to shoot a limited quantity of more powerful projectiles, including larger rocks, missiles, and fireballs.

Enemies are based on horror-monsters, and include disembodied crawling hands, flying witches, zombies, demons, walking skeletons and werewolves. While some enemies appear in several levels, others only appear in theme-related levels. Some enemies take more hits to die than others, and a couple are invincible.

== Release ==
Monster Bash was the first shareware game Apogee developed to take up a megabyte of disk space. To cater for users with slower modems and better commercialize the game, Apogee created a cut down version titled "Monster Bash Lite".

== Reception ==
Reception

Review score
Publication	Score
Dragon	3/5

Monster Bash's three episodes were reviewed in 1993 in Dragon #200 by Sandy Petersen in the "Eye of the Monitor" column. Petersen gave the game 3 out of 5 stars.
