= Kroz =

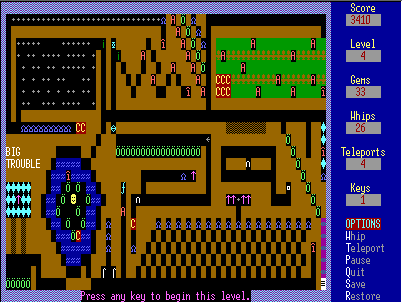
- Screenshot
- Developer: Scott Miller
- Publisher: Apogee Software
- Designer: Scott Miller
- Platform: MS-DOS
- Release: 1987
- Genre: Roguelike
- Mode: Single-player

Kroz is a series of Roguelike video games created by Scott Miller for IBM PC compatibles. The first episode in the series, Kingdom of Kroz, was released in 1987 as Apogee Software's first game. It was also published on Big Blue Disk #20. Kroz introduced the scheme of the first episode being free and charging money for additional episodes, a technique which defined the business model for Apogee and was adopted by other MS-DOS shareware publishers.

The games were discontinued in 1999. In March 2009, the whole Kroz series was released as freeware by Apogee, and the source code was released as free software under the GPL-2.0-or-later license.

== Gameplay ==
The object of the game is to survive numerous levels of attacking monsters and ultimately find the priceless Magical Amulet of Kroz. The player character collects gems as they go; each time a monster touches them, they lose a gem and the monster dies. The character's main defense consists of whips which can be used to kill monsters and destroy certain walls, but each whip can only be used once. Some levels are generated randomly; these tend to be rather chaotic, and essentially consist of a mad dash through waves of attacking enemies to pick up valuable objects and/or escape to the stairway. A major part of the game is careful conservation of gems and whips; sometimes it is better to allow an enemy to take a gem rather than use valuable whips that will be needed to break down walls blocking the exit.

== Development ==
The Kroz games were inspired by an earlier dungeon crawling game, Rogue. Scott Miller tried to create a game that had some of the elements of Rogue, but with less randomness and more reliance on the abilities of the player than on luck. Miller, fond of including backwards words in his games, came up with the name by spelling Zork backwards.

Kingdom of Kroz was written in Turbo Pascal 3.0. Later games in the series were written in Turbo Pascal 5.0. The game was implemented entirely in the 80×25 16 color CGA text mode of IBM PC compatibles, using various characters in the computer's character set, as well as different colors, to present a "graphical" environment. The game uses ASCII characters, as well as some extended ASCII graphical characters from the original IBM PC character set, to represent the player character, walls, monsters and items.

== Releases ==
The game was originally distributed as shareware. It was later expanded to consist of seven episodes, with only the first episode distributed as shareware, and the rest available commercially. The episodes are:

Collection	Episode	Release	Levels	Notes
Original Kroz trilogy	#1 Kingdom of Kroz	1987	25	a.k.a. Kingdom of Kroz I; a.k.a. Kingdom of Kroz II
Original Kroz trilogy	#2 Caverns of Kroz	1988	40	a.k.a. Kroz; a.k.a. Caverns of Kroz II
Original Kroz trilogy	#3 Dungeons of Kroz	1989	30	a.k.a. Kroz II; a.k.a. Dungeons of Kroz II
Super Kroz Trilogy	#4 Return to Kroz	1990	20	a.k.a. Shrine of Kroz; a.k.a. Castle of Kroz
Super Kroz Trilogy	#5 Temple of Kroz	1990	20	a.k.a. Valley of Kroz
Super Kroz Trilogy	#6 The Final Crusade of Kroz	1990	25	a.k.a. The Last Crusade of Kroz
N/A	#7 The Lost Adventures of Kroz	1990	75	
N/A	#8 The Underground Empire of Kroz	Cancelled	N/A	Planned to be released in March 1991.

The first two games in the series, Caverns of Kroz and Dungeons of Kroz, were originally published in the disk magazine I.B.Magazette in 1987. The third game, Kingdom of Kroz, was sent in 1987 to the disk magazine Big Blue Disk as a submission for a contest they were having, where it was published in 1988. The other two games were also published later on Big Blue Disk, in 1989.

At the same time, Miller, looking for other avenues to distribute his games, turned to the shareware model. Shareware was distributed freely through bulletin board systems (BBS), where the boards' users made voluntary donations. Since shareware was not very profitable at the time, Miller developed a variation of the shareware model, dubbed the "Apogee model", in which only a fraction of the game would be made available to play for free on BBS. The game, upon completion, would display Miller's mailing address to the player and ask them to contact him to pay for that game, which would allow them to buy the rest of the game's "episodes". He applied this model to the Kroz trilogy by sharing only Kingdom of Kroz over BBS while retaining the other two for sale. This shareware version of Kingdom of Kroz was the first game to bear the name of Miller's one-man company, Apogee Software Productions. The game proved successful, with checks sent to Miller amounting to roughly US$80,000–US$100,000 and him receiving between US$100 and US$500 every single day.

Return to Kroz, originally called Castle of Kroz, was initially published in Big Blue Disk in 1990, before becoming the shareware episode of the second trilogy of Kroz games, the Super Kroz Trilogy.

In 1990, an enhanced version of Kingdom of Kroz was released as Kingdom of Kroz II, which became the shareware episode of the series as a whole. Kingdom of Kroz II was different from the original version, and incorporated 21 different levels, many of them from later games in the series, especially from The Lost Adventures of Kroz. The original Kingdom of Kroz I stopped being distributed as shareware, but was still available commercially, and was then marketed as the third episode in the series, with episodes two and three moving up one place. For a time, the series consisted of seven commercial episodes (including the original Kingdom of Kroz I), plus an enhanced version of one of them (Kingdom of Kroz II) distributed as shareware. During this time, to be able to buy the commercial episodes, the shareware episode had to be registered first.

In 1991, the other two episodes of the first trilogy were enhanced to their "II" versions, and the original Kingdom of Kroz I stopped being available, being replaced by its enhanced version.

=== Source code ===
At one point the source code for Kingdom of Kroz could be purchased for $190, Return to Kroz for $350 and The Lost Adventures of Kroz for $950. Later the source code of Kingdom of Kroz II was for sale for $400, Return to Kroz for $300 and The Lost Adventures of Kroz for $500. By 2009, the source code was released under the GPL-2.0-or-later license.

== Reception ==
Reception

Review score
Publication	Score
Shareware Magazine	5/5 (Kroz 1)

Award
Publication	Award
Big Blue Disk	2nd Place CodeQuest '87, IBM PC compatible division (Kingdom of Kroz)

The original Kingdom of Kroz game took top honors in the game category in Big Blue Disk's CodeQuest '87 programming contest in 1988, and came out number two overall.

== Legacy ==
The Kroz concept, including the text mode implementation, was cloned by Potomac Computer Systems for the ZZT games, which also used the same shareware business model. The company later became Epic Games.
