= Todd Replogle =

American video game programmer

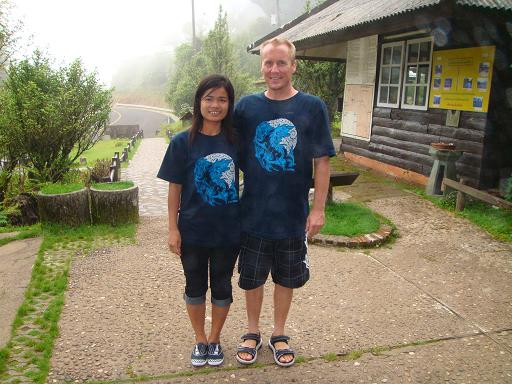
Replogle and wife Malisa at Doi Inthanon National Park in Thailand (2008)

Todd Jason Replogle (born 1969) is an American video game programmer best known as the co-creator of the Duke Nukem series. He wrote six 2D action games for MS-DOS released as shareware by Apogee Software between 1990 and 1993. This includes Duke Nukem and Duke Nukem II, which are multidirectional scrolling platform games.

Replogle worked as a programmer on a team of developers for Duke Nukem 3D, published in 1996. One of the first major 2.5D games following Doom, it used the Build engine by Ken Silverman.

After Duke Nukem 3D, Replogle started some technical experimentation into what would later become Duke Nukem Forever. He retired from the gaming industry in 1997. The last game Replogle was known to be working on was called "Mr. Fist". This was something he showed to 3D Realms, but it was never published.

== Personal life ==
Replogle graduated from Soquel High School in Soquel, California as a member of the class of 1987. He lives with his wife Malisa and son Tyler in Chonburi, Thailand.

== Games ==
- Caves of Thor (1990)
- Monuments of Mars (1991)
- Dark Ages (1991)
- Duke Nukem (1991)
- Cosmo's Cosmic Adventure (1992)
- Duke Nukem II (1993)
- Duke Nukem 3D (1996)
