= Paganitzu =

1991 video game

- Developer(s): Keith Schuler
- Publisher(s): Apogee Software
- Platform(s): DOS
- Release: 1991
- Genre(s): Puzzle
- Mode(s): Single-player

Paganitzu is a puzzle video game created by Keith Schuler and published by Apogee Software for IBM PC compatibles in 1991. It is the sequel to Chagunitzu. The player controls Alabama "Al" Smith, who works his way through an ancient Aztec pyramid while solving Sokoban-like puzzles.

Paganitzu was published in three episodes: "Romancing the Rose", "The Silver Dagger", and "Jewel of the Yucatan". The first was distributed as shareware. In 2015, it was re-released on Steam with Microsoft Windows and macOS support.

== Gameplay ==
Part 1

The object of the game is to collect all the keys in a level to unlock the exit and try not to get killed by monsters and traps. The object of the third episode is to reach the statue with the yellow stone. Each episode has 20 levels, but episode 3 has one more playable level and four secret unplayable levels from Chagunitzu. Treasures can be collected for points and special encounters can be found for 500 points each. Touching some of the walls will reveal secret passages. Dirt can be uncovered and rocks can be pushed around. Rocks pushed into water, lava or slime turn the spot into solid terrain. Each episode has different puzzles and enemy tackling.

=== Episode 1 ===
Spiders can be killed by being cloistered in one square, which destroys anything except for walls. If water pipes are destroyed, the water will stop flowing. Certain spots teleport Alabama around the level. One trap Alabama will frequently face is spears that elongate and try to plunge into him. Those traps can be disarmed by hitting something else into their path as they elongate. Once disarmed, they block a certain amount of space. There are also snakes that spit fire horizontally if Alabama crosses their path. To pass them, there must be an item, spider or boulder blocking their view. One unique puzzle requires Alabama to shed some light in a dark level before it can be completed.

=== Episode 2 ===
Enemies in this episode cannot be killed and must be avoided at all costs. Levers in many of the levels can be pulled to switch flame traps on and off. One unique puzzle requires Alabama to pull a set of levers in the correct sequence.

=== Episode 3 ===
Skeleton Lizards are completely harmless enemies that only obstruct Alabama. There are living pods that fire projectiles horizontally and vertically and must be dealt with in the same manner as the snakes. Throughout the levels, Alabama will encounter statues with different functions. A statue with a yellow stone is used to exit to the next level. A statue with green arrows can be passed uni-directionally either horizontally or vertically. A statue with a blue stone is used to invert the arrows of a green statue. A statue with a red stone is used to remove one part of water. One unique puzzle requires Alabama to navigate through a maze of invisible walls.
