= Slipgate Ironworks =

Danish video game developer

Slipgate Ironworks ApS
- Formerly: Interceptor Entertainment ApS (2010–2017); Slipgate Studios (2017–2019)
- Type: Subsidiary
- Industry: Video games
- Founded: 2010; 16 years ago in Herning, Denmark
- Founders: Frederik Schreiber
- Headquarters: Aalborg, Denmark
- Key people: Frederik Schreiber (managing director)
- Number of employees: >200 (2022)
- Parent: Saber Interactive (2021–present)
- Website: slipgate-ironworks.com

Slipgate Ironworks ApS (formerly Interceptor Entertainment ApS and Slipgate Studios ApS) is a Danish video game developer based in Aalborg, founded in 2010 by Frederik Schreiber.

== History ==
Interceptor Entertainment was founded in 2010 by managing director Frederik Schreiber, at the time based in Herning. The company's first project was Duke Nukem 3D: Reloaded, a fan remake of Duke Nukem 3D announced in October 2010 but put on hold in September 2011. In February 2014, Interceptor teased a new game titled Duke Nukem: Mass Destruction. In response, Gearbox Software, the owners of the Duke Nukem trademark, filed a lawsuit against the company. The game's name was changed to Bombshell by May. In March 2014, Interceptor part-owner SDN Invest acquired 3D Realms.

In September 2016, Interceptor and 3D Realms announced Rad Rodgers, a platform game running on Unreal Engine 4 and starring the title character and his console-come-to-life friend Dusty (voiced by Jon St. John). The studio started a Kickstarter crowdfunding campaign with a goal of $50,000, raising a total of $81,861 within 30 days. In March 2017, Interceptor announced that it was restructuring, expecting to assume a new name within the following months. The studio rebranded as Slipgate Studios and sold the Rad Rodgers intellectual property off to THQ Nordic. To avoid confusion with an eponymous company based in Las Vegas, Slipgate Studios changed its name to Slipgate Ironworks, the name of a defunct company formerly run by John Romero, in March 2019.

In August 2021, Saber Interactive acquired the studio as part of Embracer Group. In December 2023, "at least half" of Slipgate and 3D Realms was laid off as part of Embracer's restructuring. Layoffs continued into January 2024. In March 2024, Saber was sold to Beacon Interactive, a new company from Saber co-founder Matthew Karch. Many of Saber's studios, including Slipgate, were included in the sale.

== Games developed ==
Year	Title	Platform(s)	Notes
2013	Rise of the Triad	Windows	
2016	Bombshell	Windows	
2018	Rad Rodgers	PlayStation 4, Windows, Xbox One	
2019	Ancestors Legacy	PlayStation 4, Xbox One	Port development
2020	Daymare: 1998	PlayStation 4, Xbox One	Port development
2020	Ghostrunner	Nintendo Switch, PlayStation 4, Windows, Xbox One	Co-developed with One More Level
2020	Metamorphosis	Nintendo Switch, PlayStation 4, Xbox One	Port development
2020	Paradise Lost	Nintendo Switch, PlayStation 4, Xbox One	Port development
2022	Of Bird and Cage	Nintendo Switch, PlayStation 4, Xbox One	Port development
2023	Kingpin: Reloaded	Windows	Remaster of Kingpin: Life of Crime
2024	Graven	Nintendo Switch, PlayStation 4, PlayStation 5, Windows, Xbox One, Xbox Series X/S	
2024	Phantom Fury	Windows, Nintendo Switch, PlayStation 5, Xbox Series X/S	
2024	Wrath: Aeon of Ruin	Nintendo Switch, PlayStation 4, Xbox One	Port development
2025	Tempest Rising	Windows	Co-developed with 2B Games
TBA	Core Decay	Windows	Co-developed with Ivar Hill
TBA	Warpaws	Nintendo Switch, PlayStation 5, Windows, Xbox Series X/S	Co-developed with 2B Games

=== Cancelled ===
- Duke Nukem 3D: Reloaded
- Devil's Hunt (ports)
