= George Broussard =

American video game designer and producer

- Education: Stephen F. Austin State University
- Occupations: Video game producer; designer
- Years active: 1990-present
- Known for: Co-founding Apogee Software
- Notable work: Pharaoh's Tomb; Duke Nukem 2; Duke Nukem Forever

George Broussard is an American video game producer and designer. He is one of the creators of the Duke Nukem series, along with Todd Replogle, Allen Blum, and Scott Miller.

== Biography ==
Broussard released his early games under the name Micro F/X. In 1991, Broussard partnered with Scott Miller as co-owner of Apogee Software. Broussard is perhaps best known for his 12+ year development with many hurdles of Duke Nukem Forever as the lead project manager, before he asked Gearbox Software to take over, which ultimately finished the project. The 3D Realms website notes that he is probably the only person in the industry to have misspelled his own name (as "Broussad") on a shareware title he created on his own, Pharaoh's Tomb.

In 2013, Broussard competed in the indie game competition Ludum Dare with The Road, a side-scrolling browser game that reflects on the futility of existence.

Broussard suffered a minor stroke in May 2014 and recovered quickly.

== Selected ludography ==
Year	Game title	Role
1990	Pharaoh's Tomb	Designer
1991	Duke Nukem	Graphics / Artwork
1993	Duke Nukem II	Producer
1996	Duke Nukem 3D	Executive Producer
2001	Max Payne	Producer
2006	Prey	Producer
2011	Duke Nukem Forever	Creative Director
2013	Shadow Warrior	Project Leader
