= Scott Miller (entrepreneur) =

American video game designer, programmer and entrepreneur

- Born: 1961 (age 64–65); Florida, U.S.
- Occupations: Video game designer; video game programmer; entrepreneur
- Known for: Apogee Software "Apogee model" distribution

Scott Miller (born 1961) is an American video game designer, programmer, and entrepreneur best known for founding Apogee Software (which later became 3D Realms) in 1987. Starting with the Kroz series for MS-DOS from that year, Miller pioneered the concept of giving away the first game in a trilogy—distributed freely as shareware—with the opportunity to purchase the remaining two episodes. This method became the standard distribution method for Apogee. Competitors such as Epic MegaGames later adopted the same business model.

== Biography ==
Growing up, Miller lived with his father, Boyd Miller, an engineer at NASA who worked on the Apollo and Gemini programs. Miller began writing video games in 1975 on a Wang 2200 while living in Australia. He wrote several MS-DOS games that circulated widely on BBS file bases: Computer Quiz, Astronomy Quiz, BASIC Quiz, Beyond the Titanic, Supernova, Kingdom of Kroz, Word Whiz, Trek Trivia. Miller started as a game programmer, but later handled the primary business duties of his company, Apogee Software (later known as 3D Realms). He produced and/or co-designed all third-party games associated with the company, including Wolfenstein 3D, Raptor: Call of the Shadows, Terminal Velocity, Max Payne and Prey.

He created the method of game distribution where one episode of a game is released freely as shareware, and the follow-up episodes are sold through the company. The free episode is the carrot-on-a-stick; an advertisement to purchase the remaining, commercial episodes. Kingdom of Kroz, in 1987, was the first game to use this method, which Miller refers to as the "Apogee Model." Upon success with this model with the seven Kroz episodes, Miller left his full-time job in early 1990s and devoted full efforts into growing Apogee. It was at this time that Miller contacted key members at Softdisk (a monthly software magazine delivered on floppy disks to subscribers) who later formed id Software, and convinced them to make Commander Keen to be released through Apogee. The series was a success enabling id Software to become an independent studio. Miller was later instrumental in the formation of publisher Gathering of Developers in 1998. He later helped found the Radar Group.

Miller was a professional writer in the 1980s, having co-authored a book on video games, Shootout: Zap the Video Games, and writing a weekly column for The Dallas Morning News for four years (1982–1985), titled "Video Vision" (later changed to "Computer Fun"). He also wrote for COMPUTE!'s PC and PCjr and other magazines. From 2006 to 2008, Miller maintained an industry blog, www.GameMatters.com, where he was a strong proponent of studio independence, and of studios and publishers creating original brands rather than licensing brands from other media sources.

GameSpot named Miller as number 14 in their listing of the Most Influential People in Computer Gaming of All Time. In 1997, Computer Gaming World ranked him as number 14 on the list of the Most Influential People of All Time in computer gaming for originating the Apogee model.
