= 3D Realms =

Video game publisher

3D Realms Entertainment ApS
- Formerly: Apogee Software Productions; Apogee Software, Ltd.
- Type: Subsidiary
- Industry: Video games
- Founded: 1987; 39 years ago in Garland, Texas, US
- Founder: Scott Miller
- Headquarters: Aalborg, Denmark
- Key people: Frederik Schreiber (CEO)
- Products: List of 3D Realms games
- Parent: Saber Interactive (2021–present)
- Website: 3drealms.com

3D Realms Entertainment ApS is a video game publisher based in Aalborg, Denmark. Scott Miller founded the company in his parents' home in Garland, Texas, in 1987 as Apogee Software Productions to release his game Kingdom of Kroz. In the late 1980s and early 1990s, the company popularized a distribution model where each game consists of three episodes, with the first given away free as shareware and the other two available for purchase. Duke Nukem was a major franchise created by Apogee to use this model, and Apogee published Commander Keen and Wolfenstein 3D the same way.

Apogee began using the brand name 3D Realms for its 3D games in 1994, and in 1996 rebranded the company itself to 3D Realms to focus on traditionally-published 3D titles. Duke Nukem 3D (1996) was released under this name to great success. 3D Realms largely ceased its publishing and development operations afterwards to focus on two extensively delayed games: Prey (2006), which was under development until being taken over by another studio in 2001, and Duke Nukem Forever (2011), which remained under development until 2009. The "Apogee Software" name, library, and logo were licensed to Terry Nagy in 2008, who established Apogee Software LLC to develop and publish ports and spinoffs of Apogee titles.

In 2009, 3D Realms, citing financial issues, laid off its development team and the majority of its staff, effectively ceasing operations. In March 2014, the company was acquired by SDN Invest, a Danish holding company and part-owner of Interceptor Entertainment, and relaunched later that year as 3D Realms Entertainment ApS, headquartered in Denmark. 3D Realms Entertainment has since served as a games publisher. Miller remained an advisor for the company until 2021, when he and Nagy acquired the Apogee brand and relaunched Apogee Software LLC as Apogee Entertainment, an independent games publisher. In August 2021, 3D Realms Entertainment was acquired by Embracer Group subsidiary Saber Interactive, which was spun off from Embracer in March 2024.

== History ==
=== Apogee Software ===
==== Background ====
In the early 1980s, Scott Miller often spent time in the computer lab of the high school he was attending, programming text adventures on the facility's Apple II and getting to know fellow student George Broussard. Following graduation, both of them took jobs at local amusement arcade The Twilight Zone, allowing Miller to attend college and increase his interest in video games at the same time. Following his sophomore year, Miller dropped out of the University of Dallas to focus entirely on video games, including participating in tournaments as well as programming his own games. At that time, he found a special interest in the Turbo Pascal programming language and its easy integration on IBM Personal Computers. Miller subsequently figured that his knowledge on video games should earn him more money than he made at The Twilight Zone, wherefore he, with assistance by Broussard, wrote a manual-style book on "how to beat video games". The book fell into obscurity due to an oversaturated market but landed Miller a job as a video game critic for The Dallas Morning News and minor game-centric papers. After four years of writing for the newspaper, he decided that he was capable of creating games that were better than those that he had to review and quit his job. Miller acquired a modem, which he installed in his parents' house in Garland, Texas, and started operating as a full-time independent game developer.

==== The Apogee Model (1987–1996) ====
The Apogee Software logo

Most games developed by Miller at the time used extended ASCII characters as graphics. The format appeared popular to him but ultimately proved unsuccessful when pitching them to publishers, adding to him not having a college degree or any professional experience in game development. As such, he considered self-printing copies of his games, or distributing them freely through bulletin board systems (BBS), where the boards' users make voluntary donations, a model known as shareware distribution. As the prior option seemed too expensive to Miller, he had to choose the latter, despite being urged not to by friends and colleagues. Miller released Beyond the Titanic and Supernova as shareware games in 1986 and 1987, respectively, but income was low, at roughly US$10,000 donated in a year for both games combined. Miller's next game, Kingdom of Kroz, was developed to include 60 levels, more than what he wanted to release to the public for no cost. As such, he developed a new distribution model, dubbed the "Apogee model", in which only a fraction of the game would be made available to play for free on BBS, which, upon completion, would display Miller's mailing address to the player and ask them to contact him to buy the rest of the game. He applied this model to Kingdom of Kroz by breaking it up into three parts, named episodes, and sharing the first one over BBS while retaining the other two for sale. Released on November 26, 1987, Kingdom of Kroz was the first game to bear the name of Miller's one-man company, Apogee Software Productions. The game proved successful, with checks sent to Miller amounting to roughly US$80,000–US$100,000 and him receiving between US$100 and US$500 every single day. Broussard later joined Apogee, merging his own, lesser-known game company Micro-FX into it.

==== 3D Realms (1996–2009) ====
In 1994, Apogee decided to launch different brand names for each genre of games it published; it created 3D Realms for 3D games, publishing Terminal Velocity in 1995 and developing the 1996 Duke Nukem 3D under the name, with the other titles released in those years still under Apogee. In late 1996, however, Apogee renamed the company itself to 3D Realms to associate its brand with newer, 3D titles, and stopped using the Apogee brand name. The last game to be published under the Apogee name was Stargunner in 1996. Most of the proposed brands were never used, as 3D games like Duke Nukem became the company's focus. 3D Realms launched a brand for pinball games, Pinball Wizards, in February 1997, but only published Balls of Steel (1997) under the name. Beginning in 1997 3D Realms shifted from episodic MS-DOS titles to non-episodic console and personal computer games. In the process it abandoned the shareware model in favor of a traditional publishing model; it also largely ceased its activities as a developer that same year, releasing only Shadow Warrior (1997). The sole exceptions were Prey (2006), which stayed in development until 2001 when it was transferred to Human Head Studios, and Duke Nukem Forever (2011), which famously stayed in development at 3D Realms as vaporware until 2009.

The "Apogee Software" name, library, and logo were licensed to Terry Nagy in 2008, who formed Apogee Software, LLC as a separate company that would handle distribution, remakes, and other developments related to older Apogee games. 3D Realms retained the corporate name of Apogee Software, Ltd. Apogee Software, LLC was renamed Apogee Entertainment in 2021.

==== Corporate restructuring, legal disputes (2009–2014) ====
After Prey was transferred away from 3D Realms in 2001, the only project under development at the company was Duke Nukem Forever, originally announced in 1997. The release date of the game was "when it's done." 3D Realms continued some operations as a publisher as part of the Gathering of Developers publishing group, but otherwise served only as the publisher and licensee of Duke Nukem-related spinoffs and mobile games for the next few years. On May 6, 2009, the development of Duke Nukem Forever was halted, and major staff cuts were initiated with the entire development team and most other employees laid off. According to Miller, the development was using up much of the company's funds as they struggled to bring in new 3D rendering technology for the game, leading to the decision to cut their staff and sell the company.

On May 14, 2009, Take-Two, holders of the publishing rights of Duke Nukem Forever, filed a breach of contract suit against 3D Realms over failing to deliver the game. Take-Two Interactive asked for a restraining order and a preliminary injunction, to make 3D Realms keep the Duke Nukem Forever assets intact during proceedings. On May 18, 2009, 3D Realms key executives announced that "3D Realms has not closed and is not closing", but that due to lack of funds development operations were ceasing and the company would continue to "license and co-create games based upon the Duke Nukem franchise." They accused Take-Two of trying to acquire the Duke Nukem franchise in a "fire sale".

On September 3, 2010, Take-Two Interactive announced that development of Duke Nukem Forever had been shifted over to Gearbox Software, effectively ending 3D Realms' association with the game after 12 years of development. 3D Realms remained credited as a co-developer on Duke Nukem Forever, due to its involvement in developing most of the game. The rights and intellectual property were sold to Gearbox, however, who became the owners of the Duke Nukem franchise.

An external developer, Interceptor Entertainment, started work on a fan-project remake of Duke Nukem 3D in 2010. They received a limited authorization from Gearbox to proceed with the game, which was named Duke Nukem 3D: Reloaded. However, after Duke Nukem Forever's release and negative reception in 2011, Duke Nukem 3D: Reloaded was put on hold indefinitely.

In an interview conducted with Scott Miller in April 2011, Miller specified that 3D Realms was involved with several projects: "we have several projects underway, all fairly small—not any big console games. Once [Duke Nukem Forever] comes out we'll be definitely looking to invest into other projects, and maybe other up-n-coming [sic] teams who are blazing new trails on smaller platforms, like smart phones and XBLA." 3D Realms did not publish any released titles over the next few years, however.

In June 2013, 3D Realms sued Gearbox for unpaid royalties as well as unpaid money for selling the Duke Nukem intellectual property. The lawsuit was dropped in September 2013 with 3D Realms apologizing with an announcement that it had resolved any differences it had with Gearbox. In February 2014, Gearbox sued 3D Realms, Interceptor Entertainment and Apogee Software, LLC for developing a new game called Duke Nukem: Mass Destruction. Gearbox stated that it was still the rights holder of the Duke Nukem franchise, and permission had not been granted by it to develop the game. 3D Realms soon after released a statement admitting its wrongdoing. The lawsuit was settled in August 2015, with Gearbox stressing that it was still the lawful owner of the Duke Nukem intellectual property.

=== 3D Realms Entertainment ===
==== Acquisition by SDN Invest and relaunch (2014–2021) ====
In March 2014, SDN Invest, the part-owner of Interceptor Entertainment, acquired 3D Realms for an undisclosed sum. Mike Nielsen, the founder and chairman of SDN Invest, became the new chief executive officer of 3D Realms, headquartered in Aalborg, Denmark and incorporated in 2015 as 3D Realms Entertainment ApS. Miller remained with the company as a creative consultant, while Apogee Software LLC retained the license to the Apogee brand and library.

In May 2014, 3D Realms announced it was to publish Bombshell by Interceptor Entertainment, and in October 2014 the company returned to distributing its own titles with a digital anthology collection. Bombshell was released on January 29, 2016, as 3D Realms' first published title since 2005.

On February 28, 2018, 3D Realms announced the game Ion Maiden, a prequel to Bombshell, developed by Voidpoint and using Ken Silverman's Build Engine. In May 2019, the company was hit with a $2 million trademark infringement lawsuit by heavy metal group Iron Maiden who claimed Ion Maiden was "nearly identical to the Iron Maiden trademark in appearance, sound and overall commercial impression" and was "attempting to trade off on Iron Maiden's notoriety." In July 2019, 3D Realms and Voidpoint changed the name of Ion Maiden to Ion Fury to end to the lawsuit. Ion Fury was released on August 15, 2019. Since then, 3D Realms published Ghostrunner (2020) and announced several projects which have been under development for multiple years without further notice.

In April 2021, Miller and Nagy acquired the Apogee name from 3D Realms and relaunched Apogee Software LLC as Apogee Entertainment. In 2022, Miller stated in a blog post that he was now uninvolved with 3D Realms and that "[the company] no longer has any link to the past, other than in name only" because he was no longer there to help design and fund games.

==== Acquisition by Embracer Group (2021–2023) ====
In August 2021, Embracer Group announced that it acquired the company through Saber Interactive, which will be the parent company. 3D Realms published Cultic on October 13 (2022).

In March 2023, 3D Realms announced that it hired Justin Burnham (formerly of Devolver Digital, Good Shepherd) to the position of CCO.

==== Reboot (2023–present) ====
On September 30, 2023, 3D Realms held its 4th annual Realms Deep event modernizing the company's branding and announcing release dates for several previously unreleased titles. Two days later on October 2, it published Ion Fury: Aftershock in collaboration with developer Voidpoint.

On October 24, 2023, 3D Realms published Ripout into early access in collaboration with developer Pet Project Games. On November 16, 3D Realms published The Kindeman Remedy in collaboration with developer Troglobyte Games.

On December 5, 2023, 3D Realms co-published (with Interplay) the Slipgate Ironworks-developed Kingpin Reloaded. In mid-December, "at least half" of 3D Realms and Slipgate Ironworks was laid off as part of Embracer's restructuring. Layoffs continued into January 2024. 3D Realms announced in September 2023 that it had partnered with Atmos Games to publish Twisted Tower.

On January 24, 2024, 3D Realms co-published (with Fulqrum Publishing) the Slipgate Ironworks-developed Graven out of early access. On February 27, 3D Realms co-published (with Fulqrum Publishing) the Slipgate Ironworks and Killpixel Games-developed Wrath: Aeon of Ruin out of early access.

In March 2024, Saber Interactive was sold to Beacon Interactive, a new company from Saber co-founder Matthew Karch. Many of Saber's studios, including 3D Realms, were included in the sale.
