= List of Duke Nukem media =

This is a list of media related to the Duke Nukem series of video games. Duke Nukem was originally created by Apogee Software. This list contains all officially released, scheduled, and canceled Duke Nukem media, as well as some fan-made games.

== Video games ==
=== Main series ===
- Duke Nukem (1991) (Note: Temporarily also known as Duke Nukum) (Note: part of the Duke Nukem 3D: Kill-A-Ton Collection)
- Duke Nukem II (1993)
- Duke Nukem 3D (1996)

- Plutonium PAK/Atomic Edition (1996)
- 20th Anniversary World Tour (2016)

- Duke Nukem Forever (2011)

=== Spin-offs and related titles ===
- Duke Nukem (Game Boy Color) (1999)
- Duke Nukem: Time to Kill (1998)
- Duke Nukem: Zero Hour (1999)
- Duke Nukem: Land of the Babes (2000)
- Duke Nukem: Manhattan Project (2002)
- Duke Nukem Advance (2002)
- Duke Nukem Mobile (2004)
- Duke Nukem Mobile (3D) (2004)
- Duke Nukem Mobile: Bikini Project (2005)
- Duke Nukem Arena (2007)
- Duke Nukem: Critical Mass (2011)

==== Canceled games ====
- Duke Nukem Forever (sidescroller)
- Duke Nukem: Endangered Species (later released in 2006 as Vivisector: Beast Within)
- Duke Nukem D-Day (alternatively titled Duke Nukem: Man of Valor)
- Duke Nukem: Mass Destruction (later released in 2016 as Bombshell)
- Duke Nukem: Chain Reaction
- Duke Nukem: Proving Grounds

==== Other games featuring the character ====
- Cosmo's Cosmic Adventure (1992)
- Death Rally (1996)
- Balls of Steel (1997)
- Bulletstorm (2011)
- Pinball M - Duke Nukem's Big Shot Pinball (2023)
- World of Tanks (2025)

==== Duke Nukem 3D related titles ====
===== Expansions =====
- Duke Assault (1997)
- Duke Caribbean: Life's a Beach (1997)
- Duke it out in D.C. (1997) (Note: Duke!ZONE and Duke it out in D.C. have also been released in a bundle called Duke: The Apocalypse 2)
- Duke: Nuclear Winter (1997)
- Duke Xtreme (1997) (Note: Duke!ZONE II and Duke Xtreme have also been released in a bundle called Duke: The Apocalypse)
- Duke!ZONE (1996)
- Duke!ZONE II (1997)

===== Ports =====
- Duke Nukem 3D (Game.com) (1997)
- Duke Nukem 3D (iPhone/iPod Touch) (2009)
- Duke Nukem 3D (Nokia N900) (2009)
- Duke Nukem 3D (Xbox Live Arcade) (2008)
- Duke Nukem 3D (Mega Drive) (1998)
- Duke Nukem 3D (Sega Saturn) (1997)
- Duke Nukem 64 (Nintendo 64) (1997)
- Duke Nukem: Total Meltdown (PlayStation) (1997)

===== Fan-made =====
- Duke Nukem 3D: Reloaded (reimagining of Duke Nukem 3D)

== Soundtracks ==
- Duke Nukem: Music to Score By (1999)

== Comics ==
A comic series titled Duke Nukem: Glorious Bastard by IDW Publishing was released on July 20, 2011. IDW had previously created a 22-page comic book for the Duke Nukem Forever Balls of Steel Edition.

== Film ==
In January 2018, John Cena was in talks with Paramount Pictures and Platinum Dunes to star in a Duke Nukem film franchise.
