= Jon St. John =

American voice actor

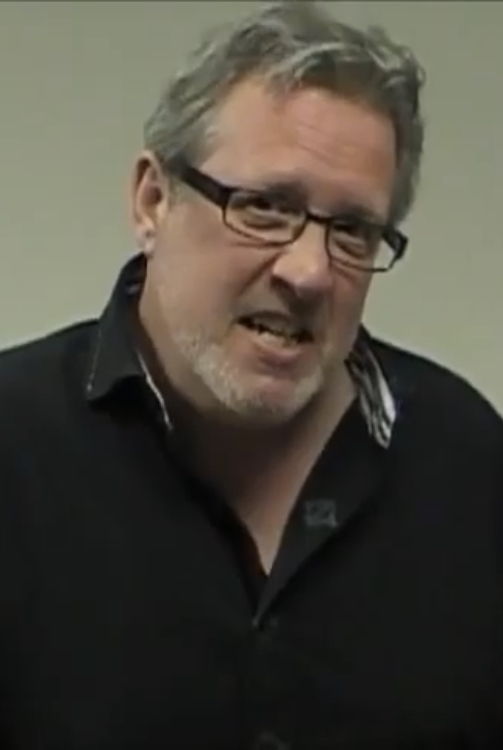
- St. John in 2014
- Born: December 19, 1960 (age 65)
- Occupation: Voice actor
- Years active: 1975–present
- Agent: Solid Talent
- Website: jsjpresents.com

Jon St. John (born December 19, 1960) is an American voice actor. He is best known for his voice roles such as Duke Nukem in the Duke Nukem video game series and Big the Cat and E-123 Omega in the Sonic the Hedgehog video game franchise.

== Career ==
He started his career in voice work in 1975, when he was a radio DJ in North Carolina.

He has provided the voice for numerous video game characters, such as the voice for the drill instructor Dwight T. Barnes as well as various other Marines in Half-Life: Opposing Force. He has done the voices for Big the Cat in Sonic Adventure and Sonic Heroes, Trash Man, General Warthog and other characters in Twisted Metal 4, E-102 Gamma in Sonic Battle, the announcer in Sonic Advance 3, E-123 Omega in Sonic Heroes, Bolt Logan in Chrome and Chrome: SpecForce and Agent Michael Ford in Conduit 2.

St. John is best known for being the voice of Duke Nukem in the Duke Nukem video game series from 1996 onwards, starting with Duke Nukem 3D. During the audition, voice director Lani Minella, told him "I want you to think of Dirty Harry when he goes 'Do you feel lucky, do you punk?” After he performed the line verbatim, Broussard suggested St. John approach the voice as "a much bigger guy, much bigger than, say, Clint Eastwood,” Dirty Harry's actor. St. Jon lowered the pitch of his voice, and Broussard was impressed, hiring him to voice the character.

He dubs the voice of professor Simon and Archibald in Runaway 2: The Dream of the Turtle. He provided the narrator's voice in Forsaken. He voiced Jack Boyd in the video games This Is The Police and its sequel.

In 2019, he took on the role of the Postal Dude for Postal 4: No Regerts.

== Filmography ==
=== Video games ===
List of voice performances in video games
| Year | Title | Role(s) | Notes | Source |
|---|---|---|---|---|
| 1996 | Big Red Racing | Jack "Bad" Jackson, Georgio Macchio, Ivan Smirnoff, Derek Derek "Rabid Dog" Simpkins, Menu Announcer | | |
| 1996 | Avengers in Galactic Storm | Captain America, Thunderstrike, Announcer, Korath, Black Knight, Supremor, Shatterax | | |
| 1996 | Starwinder | Barlow Lenz | | |
| 1997 | Duke Nukem 3D | Duke Nukem | | |
| 1997 | Balls of Steel | Duke Nukem | | |
| 1998 | Duke Nukem: Time to Kill | Duke Nukem | | |
| 1998 | NFL Xtreme | Football Players | | |
| 1998 | Major League Baseball Featuring Ken Griffey Jr. | Umpire Voice | | |
| 1999 | Duke Nukem: Zero Hour | Duke Nukem | | |
| 1999 | Evil Zone | Sho Mikagami – Danzaiver | | |
| 1999 | Twisted Metal 4 | Trash Man, Gen. Warthog, Ralph Jones, Rob Zombie, Orbital, Sweet Tooth's Spokes-Clown | | |
| 1999 | Blue Stinger | Tim, additional voices | | |
| 1999 | Half-Life: Opposing Force | Drill Instructor Dwight T. Barnes, Drill Instructor Sharpe, MPs, HECU Marines | | |
| 1999 | Revenant | Additional voices | | |
| 1999 | Tony Tough and the Night of Roasted Moths | Clown | | |
| 1999 | Sonic Adventure | Big the Cat | | |
| 2000 | Sonic Shuffle | Big the Cat | | |
| 2000 | Duke Nukem: Land of the Babes | Duke Nukem, Silverback, additional voices | | |
| 2001 | Clive Barker's Undying | Additional Voices | | |
| 2001 | Half-Life: Blue Shift | Dr. Rosenberg, Harold, HECU Marine | | |
| 2001 | Half-Life: Decay | Dr. Rosenberg, HECU Marine | | |
| 2001 | NASCAR Racing 4 | Crew Chief | | |
| 2001 | Runaway: A Road Adventure | Otto | | |
| 2002 | Duke Nukem: Manhattan Project | Duke Nukem | | |
| 2002 | Duke Nukem Advance | Duke Nukem | | |
| 2002 | NASCAR Racing 2002 Season | Crew Chief | | |
| 2003 | NASCAR Racing 2003 Season | Crew Chief | | |
| 2003 | Chrome | Bolt Logan | | |
| 2003 | Rogue Ops | Additional voices | | |
| 2003 | Sonic Adventure DX: Director's Cut | Big the Cat | Archive recordings | |
| 2003 | Spy Fiction | Lysander, Scarface/Dimitri Vedernikov | | |
| 2004 | Sonic Battle | Chaos Gamma | | |
| 2004 | Sonic Heroes | Big the Cat, E-123 Omega | | |
| 2004 | Sonic Advance 3 | Menu Announcer | | |
| 2004 | Gangland | Black Priest, Chief of Police, FBI, Gunman, Jew Boss, Vincenzo, Romano | | |
| 2005 | Call of Cthulhu: Dark Corners of the Earth | Charles Gilman, Joe Sergeant, Sgt. Sam Carter, Chief Constable Andrew Martin, Cutter Urania Seaman, Capt. Stephen Hearst, FBI Agent | | |
| 2005 | Cold War | President, Spetsnaz | | |
| 2005 | High Seize | Wallace Stevenson | | |
| 2006 | Runaway 2: The Dream of the Turtle | Archibald, Otto, Professor Simon | | |
| 2007 | America's Army: True Soldiers | Sgt. Alan Smith | | |
| 2007 | Jack Keane | Agent Montgomery, Butcher, Eric | | |
| 2007 | Tabula Rasa | Various voices | | |
| 2008 | Drakensang: The Dark Eye | Yandrik, Nolddroken, Dwarves, Troll, Orc | | |
| 2009 | Mario & Sonic at the Olympic Winter Games | Big the Cat | DS version only; archive footage | |
| 2010 | Amnesia: The Dark Descent | Victor, Basile | Justine DLC | |
| 2010 | Heroes of Newerth | Bad Ass Pack Announcer | | |
| 2010 | Star Trek Online | Chancellor J'mpok, Ambassador B'Vat, Commander Ethan Burgess | | |
| 2011 | Conduit 2 | Michael Ford | | |
| 2011 | Duke Nukem Forever | Duke Nukem, Guy on Throne | | |
| 2011 | Rochard | John Rochard | | |
| 2012 | Counter-Strike: Global Offensive | Commander | | |
| 2012 | Guild Wars 2 | PVP Narrator, Knut Whitebear | | |
| 2012 | Painkiller: Hell & Damnation | Daniel Garner | | |
| 2013 | Dota 2 | Enigma, Bloodseeker, Axe, Kunkka | | |
| 2016 | Mario & Sonic at the Rio 2016 Olympic Games | E-123 Omega | 3DS version only; archive footage | |
| 2016 | This Is the Police | Jack Boyd | | |
| 2016 | This Is the Police 2 | Jack Boyd | | |
| 2016 | Rad Rodgers: World One | Dusty | | |
| 2016 | Bombshell | Professor Jadus Heskel | | |
| 2017 | Bulletstorm: Full Clip Edition | Duke Nukem | Duke Nukem's Bulletstorm Tour DLC | |
| 2019 | Ion Fury | Dr. Jadus Heskel | | |
| 2022 | Postal 4: No Regerts | The Postal Dude | | |
| Unreleased | Dudebro II | John Dudebro | | |
| 2023 | Ion Fury - Aftershock | Dr. Jadus Heskel, General Rocco "The Rock" Rockford | Ion Fury DLC | |
| 2023 | Turbo Overkill | S.A.M.M., Dad | | |
| 2025 | World of Tanks | Duke Nukem | Battle pass | |

=== Web ===
List of voice performances in web series
| Year | Title | Role(s) | Notes | Source |
|---|---|---|---|---|
| 2013 | Aficionados Chris (YouTube) | Roger Rabbit | Voice | |

=== Theme parks ===
List of voice performances in theme parks
| Year | Title | Role(s) | Notes | Source |
|---|---|---|---|---|
| 2007 | Dollywood | Buzz the Vulture | Mystery Mine ride | |
