= Duke Nukem (character) =

Video game character

- Duke Nukem character
- Duke Nukem as he appears in Duke Nukem Forever
- First game: Duke Nukem (1991)
- Created by: George Broussard; Scott Miller; Allen Blum III; Todd Replogle
- Voiced by: English: Joe Siegler (Duke Nukem II); Todd Replogle (Duke Nukem II); Jon St. John (1996–present); Japanese: Fumihiko Tachiki

In-universe information
- Nationality: American

Duke Nukem is a fictional character and protagonist of the Duke Nukem video game series. The character first appeared in the 1991 video game Duke Nukem, developed by Apogee Software. He has since appeared in multiple sequels and spin-offs, as well appearing in various games not in the series. Most recently, he starred in Duke Nukem Forever, released by Gearbox Software, which now owns the intellectual property rights to the series and the character.

The character was created by Todd Replogle, Allen Blum III, George Broussard, and Scott Miller of Apogee Software. He was redesigned as an action-hero by George Broussard and Allen Blum for the 1996 game Duke Nukem 3D.

== Conception and design ==
While working on a title originally called "Metal Future", Apogee Software founder Scott Miller expressed his disdain for the title, feeling it should be named after a protagonist instead, taking inspiration from American comic books. He suggested the name Duke "because it's a strong-sounding name", while lead programmer Todd Replogle proposed Nukem. While the character's sprites were designed by Apogee's development team, Miller took them over to George Broussard's home and had him "take a crack at making Duke more appealing", creating a look for his face they were all satisfied with.

The character's name caused some legal troubles for Apogee, first from Duke University, and later from the Turner Broadcasting System. In the case of the former, the University claimed their trademark was violated; however Apogee's lawyer countered that there were no conflicting video games, and the two were unlikely to be confused for one another. Apogee agreed to use the character's full name in all advertising for the game, which satisfied the University's legal team. In the case of Turner Broadcasting on the other hand, their cartoon Captain Planet and the Planeteers featured a character also called "Duke Nukem", which caused Apogee to temporarily change the game title and character's name to "Duke Nukum". However, Turner had not filed for a trademark on their character's name, and their lawyer noted they were not competing in the same market as a video game. The name was changed back, and Turner's legal team did not pursue.

While working on Duke Nukem 3D, towards the end of the game's development the team became familiar with another game that had just been released by LucasArts, Full Throttle. Broussard and programmer Jim Dosé felt that that game's protagonist "sounded like what we imagined Duke would sound like. Gruff, gravelly and low-pitched." They recorded some of the character's opening monologue and sent it to a voice director, while Broussard started writing lines for the character to say at key spots in the game. The voice director, Lani Minella, proposed the role to her client Jon St. John. During the audition, she told him "I want you to think of Dirty Harry when he goes 'Do you feel lucky, do you punk?” After he performed the line verbatim, Broussard suggested St. John approach the voice as "a much bigger guy, much bigger than, say, Clint Eastwood.” St. Jon lowered the pitch of his voice, and Broussard was impressed, hiring him to voice the character.

== Appearances ==
Duke Nukem was initially created in 1987 by chief programmer Todd Replogle of Apogee Software (now 3D Realms) as the protagonist for the video game he was designing titled Metal Future, which was set in the then-near future of "one decade later from now" in 1997. After hearing the character's name, producer and founder of Apogee, Scott Miller, suggested the game should have the same name, and he helped design the character. Artwork was produced by George Broussard, Allen H. Blum III, and Jim Norwood. Duke was not voiced, but spoke through on-screen text.

In the sequel, Duke Nukem II, which was released in 1993, the same mostly-silent incarnation of the character was used, although he was now an American hero. Duke Nukem II features an intro with one line, spoken by Joe Siegler ("I'm back"), and a death scream by character co-creator Todd Replogle.

For Duke Nukem 3D, the character of Duke Nukem was substantially redesigned by George Broussard and Allen Blum into a macho, wise-cracking character. Duke Nukem 3D was one of the most controversial games at the time due to its strong violence, cultural stereotypes, strong language, and sexual content. Duke Nukem 3D, as well as the dozen or so subsequent Duke Nukem games, feature Jon St. John as the voice of Duke Nukem. Duke Nukem 3D was the first game in which the character has a significant speaking role.

In March 2018, it was announced that John Cena will star in a Duke Nukem movie for Paramount Pictures & Platinum Dunes. However, in January 2019, Duke Nukem voice actor Jon St. John stated that no movie was in development. In a press statement announcing Embracer Group's acquisition of Gearbox Software, however, production of the film was reconfirmed.

=== Games with Duke Nukem as a protagonist ===
- Duke Nukem (briefly "Duke Nukum") – 1991 – MS-DOS
- Duke Nukem II – 1993 – MS-DOS, iPhone/iPod Touch, iPad
- Duke Nukem 3D – 1996 – MS-DOS, Mac OS, Sega Saturn, Mega Drive, Game.com, Xbox Live Arcade, iPhone/iPod Touch, Nokia N900, Source ports, Android, iPad
- Duke Nukem 64 – 1997 – Nintendo 64
- Duke Nukem: Total Meltdown – 1997 – PlayStation
- Duke Nukem: Time to Kill – 1998 – PlayStation
- Duke Nukem: Zero Hour – 1998 – Nintendo 64
- Duke Nukem – 1999 – Game Boy Color
- Duke Nukem: Land of the Babes (temporarily "Planet of the Babes") – 2000 – PlayStation
- Duke Nukem: Manhattan Project – 2002 – Microsoft Windows, Xbox Live Arcade
- Duke Nukem Advance – 2002 – Game Boy Advance
- Duke Nukem Mobile – 2004 – Tapwave Zodiac
- Duke Nukem Mobile - 2004 - Cellular phones
- Duke Nukem Mobile II: Bikini Project – 2005 – Cellular phones
- Duke Nukem Mobile 3D – 2005 – Cellular phones (updated port of the original Zodiac version with enhanced graphics)
- Duke Nukem Arena - 2007 - Cellular phones (updated port of Duke Nukem Mobile 3D that included an arena-style multiplayer)
- Duke Nukem: Critical Mass – 2011 - Nintendo DS
- Duke Nukem Forever – 2011 – Microsoft Windows, Mac OS X, Xbox 360, PlayStation 3
- Duke Nukem 3D: World Tour – 2016 – Microsoft Windows, Xbox One, PlayStation 4, Nintendo Switch

=== Other appearances ===
- Cosmo's Cosmic Adventure - 1992 - MS-DOS
- Death Rally - 1996 - MS-DOS
- Balls of Steel - 1997 - Microsoft Windows
- Blood - 1997 - MS-DOS
- Serious Sam II - 2005 - Microsoft Windows, Linux, Xbox
- Death Rally - 2011 - Microsoft Windows, iOS
- Choplifter HD - 2012 - Microsoft Windows, PlayStation 3, Xbox 360
- Bulletstorm: Full Clip Edition - 2017 - Microsoft Windows, PlayStation 4, Xbox One
- Rad Rodgers: Radical Edition - 2018 - Microsoft Windows, PlayStation 4, Xbox One, Nintendo Switch
- Wild Buster: Heroes of Titan - 2018 - Microsoft Windows
- Ready Player One - 2018 - Film
- Duke Nukem's Big Shot Pinball (for Pinball M) - 2023 - Microsoft Windows, PlayStation 4/5, Xbox One, Xbox series X/S Nintendo Switch
- Duke Nukem - TBA - Film

== Reception ==
Duke Nukem has been listed on many "Best Characters" and "Best Heroes" lists over the years, including being listed as number one in ScrewAttack's "Top 10 Coolest Video Game Characters" list in 2007. Featuring him in the section "top ten forces of good" in their 2004 list of top 50 retro game heroes, Retro Gamer called Duke "the ultimate cheese hero, and a true remnant of 80’s action flicks." He was listed at number 27 in the "Top 50 Video Game Characters" list by Guinness World Records Gamer's Edition 2011. GameDaily also ranked him sixth on their list of best anti-heroes in video games. In 2011, Empire ranked him as the 20th greatest video game character, calling him "one of the best action characters ever devised" and adding that "Film might have Schwarzenegger, but Gaming's got Mr Nukem".

Reception of the character by the time of Duke Nukem Forever's release was mostly mixed. Dan Whitehead of Eurogamer elaborated on Duke Nukem's decreased relevance since 1996, and added that the character's "half-hearted digs" at rival franchises were ill-advised due to the game's datedness. Charles Onyett of IGN likened Duke Nukem's maturity to a "12-year-old boy with Internet access" and expressed disappointment in the character's datedness and the missed opportunity on the developers' part to "[play] with the idea of Duke as an anachronism". Ryan Winterhalter of 1UP.com noted that Duke Nukem had become "a caricature of his former self. He's crossed the line from charmingly foul-mouthed to obnoxious and embarrassing." Cian Hassett of PALGN was more positive about the character, finding him to be "genuinely hilarious" due to his tongue-in-cheek rejection of video game traditions (such as finding a key to open a door or wearing a special suit of armor).
