= Xargon =

1994 video game

- Developer: Epic MegaGames
- Publisher: Epic MegaGames
- Platform: DOS
- Release: NA: January 1, 1994
- Genre: Platform
- Mode: Single-player

Xargon: The Mystery of the Blue Builders is a video game trilogy created by Allen W. Pilgrim and produced by Epic MegaGames for DOS. The game is a side-scrolling platform game. The main character, Malvineous Havershim, must journey through strange landscapes as he seeks to destroy the evil Xargon.

== Gameplay ==
The basic goal of Xargon is to advance through the map by completing levels. To finish a level, the player must find and reach the exit, which is found by traversing throughout the level.

Initially, Malvineous is armed with a "laser bullet", allowing only one shot on-screen at a time which can be controlled by pressing up or down, causing the laser bullet to advance slightly upwards or downwards. Other weapons include more laser bolts, which allow Malvineous to shoot more often, rapid fire, rocks which can be thrown more strategically, and powerful fireballs which destroy every enemy in their path.

Xargon features a method of acquiring temporary power-ups and resources unique to the genre. These can be purchased at any time at the cost of emeralds, which are randomly placed in most levels. Purchasable items include health units, invincibility, and weapon upgrades.

In most of the levels, there are gift boxes that either explode when shot or contain fruit, other valuable items or nothing. Points are earned by collecting fruit, killing monsters, and collecting the four EPIC pool balls. More points are earned if the EPIC pool balls are collected in order.

Malvineous can take 5 hits, and if he dies, the player must start the level over again. His health can be restored by collecting a beating heart or collecting 16 fruits, which restores one health unit, or purchasing a health unit. Spike pits, water, acid and various other dangers kill Malvineous instantly if he touches them. The player is not limited by lives or continues and may attempt levels as many times as they wish.

== Plot ==
Malvineous Havershim is an archaeologist studying strange ruins in Madagascar. The ruins were built by an unknown ancient culture known as the 'Blue Builders'. While attempting to translate the glyphs on the walls of one Blue Builder structure, a strange gas is emitted, and Malvineous loses consciousness. Malvineous has a dream-encounter with a talking eagle named Silvertongue, who gives him cryptic warnings. He awakes in a strange land, the area in which the game takes place.

== Development ==
Xargon, produced and released by Epic MegaGames 1993, was programmed and designed by Allen W. Pilgrim. The graphics were created by Joe Hitchens, who also contributed to Epic Pinball and Jill of the Jungle. Volume One: Beyond Reality was released as shareware, but Volume Two: The Secret Chamber and Volume Three: Xargon's Fury had to be purchased commercially. The game was a contemporary of such games as Id Software's Commander Keen and Apogee Software's Duke Nukem II.

Allen Pilgrim declared the registered version freeware and released the source code on August 4, 2008. Following that, ports with SDL to new platforms and mobile devices like the Pandora were created.

== Xargon Level Editor ==
Allen Pilgrim released the Xargon Level Editor version on April 1, 2024. This includes substantial documentation. Brandon Pilgrim, John Brandon, and Harvey Patterson received special recognition for their input on the documentation and their testing of the Level Editor. Allen also created a simplified world map and a new level. Several of the songs that Dan Froelich created for Kiloblaster were used to replace the Intro music, the music for Allen's new level, and for an additional level created by John Brandon.

== Reception ==
Reception

Review score
Publication	Score
Dragon	2/5

Xargon was ranked #3 out of the Los Angeles Times top five games on May 7, 1994, after just four months on the market, behind Doom and Epic Pinball and above Duke Nukem 2. It remained for three weeks.

The game was reviewed in 1994 in Dragon #204 by Sandy Petersen in the "Eye of the Monitor" column. Petersen gave the game 2 out of 5 stars. Computer Gaming World in July 1994 said that Xargon: Beyond Reality "is an attractive, high energy" game that was better than Jill of the Jungle, and recommended it to fans of the latter, Bio Menace, or Duke Nukem.
