= Duke Nukem: Manhattan Project =

2002 video game

- Developer: Sunstorm Interactive
- Publishers: NA: Arush Entertainment; EU: Ubi Soft
- Series: Duke Nukem
- Platforms: Windows, Xbox 360, iOS
- Release: Windows; NA: May 17, 2002; EU: June 14, 2002; Xbox 360; June 23, 2010; iOS; January 9, 2014
- Genre: Platform
- Mode: Single-player

Duke Nukem: Manhattan Project is a platform game developed by Sunstorm Interactive, produced by 3D Realms, and published by Arush Entertainment. It was released on Windows on May 14, 2002, in North America and on June 14, 2002, in Europe. A port of the game would be released for the Xbox 360 on June 23, 2010, by 3D Realms directly, followed by an iOS port on January 9, 2014.

== Setting ==
Manhattan Project features the humorously musclebound action hero Duke Nukem, this time fighting Mech Morphix, a mad scientist who is using a radioactive slime dubbed G.L.O.P.P. (Gluon Liquid Omega-Phased Plasma) to metamorphose creatures into deadly monsters in order to take over Manhattan island, New York City. These enemies include metamorphic alligators, giant cockroaches, and even the Pig cops from Duke Nukem 3D. Duke also faces a few enemies who are not mutants, such as Fem-Mechs, lethal whip-wielding gynoids. Levels in the game contain recognizable parts of New York City.

== Gameplay ==
Manhattan Project is played from a 2.5D perspective. Though the engine projects the game in 3D, gameplay is restricted to a two dimensional plane.

Duke Nukem: Manhattan Project was built using a 3D engine known as Prism3D. The levels and characters are fully three-dimensional, and both the camera and Duke can move along any axis, but movement is restricted to a two dimensional plane. Utilizing the 3D engine, the player can zoom in and out focusing either on the enemy approaching or an overall view of the field. Duke can crouch, run, jump and slide kick underneath small counter space.

The game is organized in 8 chapters, each one having 3 parts. In each part, the player must rescue a "babe" strapped to a GLOPP bomb and find a coloured keycard to unlock the way to the next part. At some parts, the player gets to use a jetpack to fly over large voids or hazardous ground. The controls are also quite easy to get used to, with buttons only for jumping, moving, firing, and weapon changing. Using a cheat, player can also move the camera to any angle and take screenshots. The game CD includes a level editor named "PrismEd", but level-creation activity for the game never reached popularity among the players, and only a tiny level editing community is currently active.

Manhattan Project is a spin-off game, serving as a direct sequel to Duke Nukem: Zero Hour. Manhattan Project is much like the original Duke Nukem due to the side scrolling element (paying homage to the original) and its many other similarities, such as 'Mech Morphix' looking and acting very similar (e.g. also a mad scientist with half a metal face) to Dr. Proton, the main antagonist of Duke Nukem. Duke's primary enemy in the game was in fact originally supposed to be his old nemesis Dr. Proton, but this was changed to avoid possible continuity clashes with Duke Nukem Forever; ultimately Forever did not feature Proton except for the DLC entitled The Doctor Who Cloned Me.

== Development ==
In 1996, George Broussard was interviewed about future 3D Realms projects: he said that a Duke Nukem side-scroller called Duke Nukem Forever was in production and was supposed to come out by Christmas 1997. The project was later cancelled, with the name Duke Nukem Forever reassigned to the true Duke Nukem 3D sequel. When Manhattan Project was first shown to the public, rumours began to spread about it actually being the cancelled Duke Nukem Forever side-scroller, but this has since been clarified: Manhattan Project is a game original to ARUSH. A port of Duke Nukem: Manhattan Project was released to the Xbox Live Arcade on June 23, 2010, for 800 Microsoft Points (MSP). The release includes two avatar awards (Jetpack and Duke Nukem logo T-shirt) that can be unlocked in game.

=== Legal status ===
In 2004 Manhattan Project developer ARUSH Entertainment was bought out by HIP Interactive. Soon afterwards, HIP went bankrupt. Because of bankruptcy proceedings, the legal rights to Manhattan Project were held by a court-appointed bankruptcy firm. 3D Realms had inquired about retrieving the rights, but had been unable to do so. This has been detailed a few times online by 3D Realms' webmaster Joe Siegler in their online forums. In a June 2006 forum post, Siegler said of the situation:

Arush got bought out by a larger company. The parent company went belly up, and took Arush down with 'em. DNMP is now the legal property of a court-appointed holding company involved in the bankruptcy proceedings of the parent company whose name I can't remember. Scott & I tried to contact them about either getting the rights back so we could sell it ourselves, or just releasing it as freeware. Unfortunately, said company "isn't interested in dealing with us", per Scott. So DNMP is in rights hell, unfortunately. I would wager being the folks who "are" Duke Nukem, we could probably fight that and get the rights back, but it wouldn't be worth it, really. A lot of court costs just to release a game as freeware, or sell it when it didn't sell much in the first place.

Before all the materials were lost, Joe Siegler was able to recover a copy of the contents of the official Duke Nukem: Manhattan Project website from a former ARUSH employee, and now hosts the former contents on the 3D Realms Website.

In late February 2009, the online gaming distribution site GOG.com announced some Apogee Software titles as being available in the future for sale on their site. On this list was Duke Nukem: Manhattan Project.

The title, along with Duke Nukem, Duke Nukem II, Duke Nukem 3D and Terminal Velocity would be a part of the official launch lineup on ZOOM-Platform.com, which debuted on September 9, 2014. An enhanced mode for the game would be added on June 28, 2023. The enhanced upgrade would provide support for widescreen and ultra widescreen resolutions. This along with easier mod support, a level editor and additional languages. The new features were developed by community members (Green and Zombie), the Jordan Freeman Group and ZOOM Platform themselves.

== Reception ==
Reception

Aggregate score
Aggregator	Score		
Aggregator	iOS	PC	Xbox 360
Metacritic	55/100	78/100	41/100

Review scores
Publication	Score		
Publication	iOS	PC	Xbox 360
Computer Games Magazine	N/A	4.5/5	N/A
Computer Gaming World	N/A	4/5	N/A
Eurogamer	N/A	6/10	2/10
GameRevolution	N/A	N/A	D+
GameSpot	N/A	7.9/10	N/A
GameSpy	N/A	83%	N/A
GameZone	N/A	8.1/10	2.5/10
IGN	N/A	7.7/10	4/10
Official Xbox Magazine (US)	N/A	N/A	6/10
PC Gamer (US)	N/A	75%	N/A
VideoGamer.com	3/10	N/A	N/A
Entertainment Weekly	N/A	B+	N/A
Atomic: Maximum Power Computing	N/A	5.5/10	N/A

The PC version received "generally favorable reviews", and the iOS version received "mixed" reviews, while the Xbox 360 version received "generally unfavorable reviews", according to the review aggregation website Metacritic. GameSpy called the PC version "A slick platform arcade game at a reasonable price... captures Duke perfectly; great system performance; clever use of 3D." GameSpot was more neutral toward the same PC version, saying, "It's straightforward and good-looking... the levels are huge, and most have several paths you can take." IGN called said PC version "a polished, tried, and true title... worthy of a recommendation, especially given its keen price point and familiar antihero." The same website, however, criticized the Xbox 360 version, calling it "a rip-off compared [to] what else is on the market" and "one stone of your past that's better left unturned."

Manhattan Project was a runner-up for GameSpot's annual "Best Budget Game on PC" award, which went to Serious Sam: The Second Encounter.
