= Duke Nukem Forever: Restoration Project =

Fan-made project

- Developer: Mighty Foot Productions
- Publisher: Mighty Foot Productions
- Series: Duke Nukem
- Engine: Unreal Engine 1
- Platform: Microsoft Windows
- Release: TBA
- Genres: First-person shooter, action-adventure
- Modes: Single-player, multiplayer

Duke Nukem Forever: Restoration Project is an upcoming first-person shooter action-adventure fan-made modification video game and restoration effort developed by Mighty Foot Productions. The project's aim is to complete and polish the leaked 2001 development build of Duke Nukem Forever.

== Development and release ==
The project traces its origins to May 9, 2022, when a group known as "x0r_jmp" leaked a substantial portion of the 3D Realms development archives to 4chan; with special attention paid to the version of Duke Nukem Forever that was originally shown at E3 2001, which was based on a heavily modified game engine, Unreal Engine 1, the first version in Unreal Engine series made by Epic Games. Within the leak were two in-development builds of Duke Nukem Forever, with one dated August 2001 and the other from October of the same year, as well as the same tools and code that was being worked on by 3D Realms. Following the leak, a group of modders formed under the name Mighty Foot Productions, a reference to the in-game "Mighty Foot" attack from Duke Nukem 3D. A trailer for the fan project was released in September, 2022.

In December 2022, the team released their first demo, titled the "First Slice" on Mod DB, containing early chapters. This release functioned as a shareware-style episode, containing nine restored and polished levels that comprised the first chapter of the game, titled "High Stakes, Lady Killer". The release included a fully functional renderer (fixing lighting and texture issues present in the raw leak), restored music tracks, and bug fixes for the enemy AI. Their goal is to restore and fix the issues of the leaked game and complete the unfinished content to create a cohesive campaign. The team continued to release updates, focusing on further polishing the game's mechanics and stability, such as multiplayer features and UI upgrades.

== Reception ==
Duke Nukem Forever: Restoration Project received widespread attention from gaming media and the Duke Nukem community, which generally praised for restoring the build leak. Many outlets highlighted that the iteration of Restoration Project possessed a darker and more cinematic tone. It was noted for its technical stabilization and restoring of the 25-year-old leaked code.
