= Duke Nukem 3D: Reloaded =

- Developer: Interceptor Entertainment
- Publisher: Gearbox Software
- Producers: Khaled Ibrahimi; Daniel Hedjazi
- Designer: Frederik Schreiber
- Composers: Andrew Hulshult; Marcin Przybyłowicz
- Series: Duke Nukem
- Engine: Unreal Engine 3
- Platform: Microsoft Windows
- Release: Cancelled
- Genre: First-person shooter
- Modes: Single-player, multiplayer

Duke Nukem 3D: Reloaded is a cancelled first-person shooter fan game. The title was announced on the Gearbox forums on October 13, 2010, and is based on the Duke Nukem series. The game was intended to be a next generation reimagining of the 1996 game Duke Nukem 3D.

== Development ==
In the fall of 2010, Frederik Schreiber had started throwing around the idea of doing a Duke Nukem 3D remake, originally called Duke Nukem Next-Gen. Schreiber then created a test map to give an idea of what it may look like, which he then took screenshots of and posted on the Gearbox forums. Shortly after posting the screenshots the images and the project made their way to various gaming sites, causing a small buzz within the gaming community.

Schreiber went about getting the official permission to continue the project. He first contacted Gearbox Software, who told him to contact George Broussard and Scott Miller at 3D Realms. Schreiber proceeded to contact 3D Realms. The screenshots for the project were enough to convince Scott Miller to a certain degree about the project, but the game would need Take Two's permission for it to happen.

Schreiber again contacted Gearbox, hoping they would have a better relationship with Take Two than 3D Realms. After following the proper channels within Gearbox, he was able to get in contact with PJ Putnam, Vice President and General Counsel of Gearbox Software. Gearbox was interested in helping the project and Schreiber was eventually granted a "personal non-commercial license" to Duke Nukem.

Having received official permission to proceed, Schreiber officially announced the game on October 13, 2010, under the name Duke Nukem Next-Gen, revealing he had set up a small team to work with. It was also stated the game would be based on the Unreal Engine 3 and would not require any other game for it to run. On November 4, 2010, the game was officially renamed to Duke Nukem 3D: Reloaded.

The game has been put on an indefinite hold as of September 24, 2011, pending the resolution of differences between the Interceptor Entertainment team and Gearbox Software due to ambiguity on whether or not the finished product would actually be allowed to see release.

Schreiber spoke out on the delay in 2013, stating in an interview published in the July issue of the Danish video-game magazine, gameplay, that it was a direct result of Duke Nukem Forever's disappointing reception. He elaborated, "The problem was that Reloaded, in its then present state, was both a prettier and better game than Forever was. So they [Gearbox] could under no circumstances allow us [Interceptor] to publish it, show it, or do anything at all with it, because it would destroy the sales-opportunities they had left in Forever."

== Leak ==
In late December 2022, a playable build of Duke Nukem 3D: Reloaded leaked online that included maps and rudimentary multiplayer functionality. The leak came from x0r_jmp, a group responsible for several other Duke Nukem related leaks, most notably the 2001 build of Duke Nukem Forever leaked earlier in 2022.

== See also ==
- Black Mesa (video game) – a fan remake of Half-Life
