= Balls of Steel (video game) =

1997 video game

- Developer: Wildfire Studios
- Publisher: 3D Realms
- Platforms: Windows, Mac OS
- Release: NA: December 12, 1997
- Genre: Pinball

Balls of Steel is a pinball computer game developed by Wildfire Studios and released on December 12, 1997. It is the only game to be published under the Pinball Wizards label, a division of Apogee Software (today known as 3D Realms).

When the game was originally released, it was possible to upload high scores to the WorldScores server, for a global ranking. This feature was later discontinued.

== Tables ==
Balls of Steel features five original pinball tables:

- Darkside: Set on a remote space station under attack by alien creatures.
- Barbarian: A classic medieval fantasy quest with a huge dragon on the table.
- Firestorm: Set in a crime-ridden US city, a mad bomber is on the loose.
- Mutation: Set in an underground science lab where a bio-hazardous accident has occurred and a large, slimy monster has taken over the lab.
- Duke Nukem: A special table featuring the Apogee video game character Duke Nukem.

Another table, Devil's Island, was dropped from the game when Wildfire was given the opportunity by Apogee to include a Duke Nukem table. Devil's Island was later released as a standalone game.

The game can be played on a large scrolling screen, or a fixed screen displaying the whole table.

== Duke Nukem tie-in ==
The game includes a table based on the Apogee/3D Realms video game Duke Nukem 3D including graphics from that game and original voice-overs by Nukem actor Jon St. John. Pinball missions include fighting monsters like octabrains and pig-cops, and using powerups such as jetpacks and the Holoduke, from the Duke Nukem 3D video game.

Graphics of a pinball game named Balls of Steel appear in Duke Nukem 3D itself, in the first level, "Hollywood Holocaust", when Duke encounters the table. Balls of Steel reappears in Duke Nukem Forever.

== Development ==
Balls of Steel was in development since 1995. The game was showcased at E3 1997.

== Reception ==
Balls of Steel was a finalist for Computer Games Strategy Plus's 1998 "Classic Game of the Year" award, which ultimately went to Centipede. The editors wrote that Balls of Steel "demonstrated that you can do the Bally table on the PC, and do it well." GameSpot wrote: "If you're looking for the ultimate in PC pinball sim realism, BOS won't satisfy you. Rather, where BOS succeeds is in its fun factor." A reviewer for PinGame Journal praised the gameplay, sounds, and graphics, but criticized the "fun" due to bugs making the game unstable.

== Legacy ==
A remake for modern computers was developed in 2024 by Big Boat Interactive and published by Atari, Inc. This version didn't include the Duke Nukem table, instead having Devil's Island and tables based on Atari games Centipede and Missile Command.
