= Needle (band) =

American industrial rock band

[needle]
- Origin: Philadelphia, Pennsylvania, U.S.
- Genres: Industrial rock; industrial metal; alternative rock
- Years active: 1995–present
- Labels: Neverland Records
- Members: Jeffrey D. Erb; Lee Daniels; Joe Deblasio

Needle (stylized as [needle]) is an American industrial rock band formed in Philadelphia in 1995. The group's musical style primarily consists of aggressive electronic dance music. [needle] has seen extraordinary popularity in the Philadelphia and New York City underground music scenes with original distribution through Sony Music via Ruffhouse Records' Contract Records sub-label.

The band was originally founded by high school mates Jeffrey D. Erb and Lee Daniels after the dissolution of their former band Sri Lanka (band). Erb and Daniels have performed all of the music on their releases, with Erb playing bass guitar, writing rhythm tracks, keyboards and performing lead vocals. Daniels plays guitar and writes keyboards. The duo work with a revolving group of people who perform live with them. The band's initial full-length release "Lifeline" garnered critical praise, citing influences including Nine Inch Nails and KMFDM among others. The group also released an EP entitled "Echelon" and in 2020 released the single "On Your Knees" from its next studio album.

== History ==
Jeffrey Erb and Lee Daniels, the founding members of [needle], were school friends at Reading Senior High School in Reading, Pennsylvania. The two frequently attended local all-ages concerts around the Philadelphia area and knew that they wanted to focus exclusively on all-original music. The duo launched their musical careers when they formed the gothic rock band Sri Lanka (band) in the late '80s. After tumultuous years of competing personalities which ultimately led to the death of lead singer Brett Turner and the dissolution of Sri Lanka, Erb and Daniels reconnected in 1995 to pursue their musical path by forming the industrial dance band [needle].

Erb and Daniels began writing, with Erb performing rhythm tracks, bass guitar, keyboards and lead vocals, and Daniels on guitars and writing keyboard tracks. Erb and Daniels recorded their first album in the studio of God Lives Underwater a techno rock band from rural Perkiomenville, Pennsylvania (near Philadelphia), who was originally signed to American Recordings after being discovered by Rick Rubin. Founding members of "God Lives Underwater" David Reilly and Jeff Turzo were good friends of Erb and Daniels, having been part of the Philadelphia underground music scene, and Reilly and Turzo worked with [needle] to produce the band's first album "Lifeline".

The album was picked up for release by Contract Records, a subsidiary of Ruffhouse Records for distribution through Sony Music. With a style that combined aggressive guitars with dance rhythms and funk accents, tracks from "Lifeline" became popular in dance clubs and strip clubs up and down the East Coast. [needle] began performing in locations in support of their album, opening for acts that included Godflesh and Cubanate. Becoming popular within the industrial music scene, [needle] T-Shirts were seen being worn by major acts, including bands such as Sister Machine Gun.

Erb and Daniels recruited other musicians to perform with them live, with the original lineup consisting of Steve Sidek on drums, Sean Jacobs on keyboards, and Stephen Lentz, formerly of Tubalcain on bass guitar. After Lentz moved away from the Philadelphia area, Erb and Daniels recruited Joe Deblasio formerly of Dollhaus Puppet to perform live on drums, and Sean Jacobs took over live bass guitar.

Two songs from the album "Lifeline" were featured in an official expansion pack level of Duke Nukem 3D called "Penthouse Paradise", available exclusively from GT Interactive and Penthouse Magazine. In 1997, the band recorded an EP called Echelon which was used by Z-Axis Games in the development of an official Rollerball (1975 film) video game adaption based on the film as part of MGM Interactive video game showcase lineup. [needle] continued to perform shows throughout 1996 and 1997 while working on their next full-length studio release, when a hard disk crash caused all of their new material and original tracks to be lost.

In 2020, the band released the single "On Your Knees" produced in Philadelphia by Maxim "Lectriq" Laskavy and EDM/Rap artist Ryan Banks. The band announced that they are currently working on a new studio album entitled "Cocksucker".

== Band members ==
=== Official members ===
- Jeffrey D. Erb – lead vocals, bass, keyboards, synthesizers, piano, programming, percussion (1995–present)
- Lee Daniels – guitars, keyboards, synthesizers, programming, backing vocals (1995–present)

=== Additional touring line-up ===
- Joe Deblasio – drums, percussion (1999–present)
- Steven Lentz – bass (1995–1998)
- Sean Jacobs – bass, keyboards, synthesizers (1995–2005)
- Steve Sidek – drums, percussion (1995–1999)

== Discography ==
=== EPs ===
- Echelon (1996)
- On Your Knees (2020)

=== Studio albums ===
- Lifeline (1995)
