= Duke Nukem Advance =

2002 video game

- North American box art
- Developer: Torus Games
- Publisher: Take-Two Interactive
- Series: Duke Nukem
- Platform: Game Boy Advance
- Release: NA: August 13, 2002; EU: September 20, 2002
- Genre: First-person shooter
- Modes: Single-player, multiplayer

Duke Nukem Advance is a 2002 video game in the Duke Nukem series, released for the Game Boy Advance. Although it is a first-person shooter and many of the graphics and sounds have been ported from Duke Nukem 3D, the game has an original storyline and levels, and can thus be considered to be a spin-off of 3D.

Four difficulty levels can be selected at the beginning of the game. Multiplayer games are possible, with up to four players requiring a copy. An option to save one's progress appears at the completion of each level, with five save game slots to choose from.

The game received mostly positive reviews.

== Controls ==
Since the Game Boy Advance has a limited number of controls, the game offers four different control setups. These set the buttons for shooting, jumping, strafing, weapon selection and looking up and down. When pausing the game, the player can also view the level's map. The player can pan around the map, as well as zoom in or out. Some of the level's secrets can also be discovered simply by looking at the map.

== Plot ==
Duke Nukem, working for general Graves, is asked to investigate Area 51, after reports indicate the hostile infiltration of an alien species. After getting rid of much of the alien threat there, Duke learns about how the aliens require "environmental regulators" to exist, and follows them to the Temple of Amun in Egypt.

While in Egypt, Duke Nukem discovers a vast collection of alien hybrid creatures in stasis, apparently an army meant to take over the world. A nearby power source detected by general Graves seems to supply their environmental regulators, so Duke is sent to shut it down. Subsequently, he learns that activating an override pump will drain the hibernation tanks, killing the entire alien hybrid army.

Nukem also manages to destroy the controller alien overseeing the stasis area, but it turns out that the alien activated a self-destruct sequence just before his death. Duke manages to narrowly escape the collapsing temple, using one of the alien transporters to get away.

Having re-establishing contact with the general, Duke Nukem discovers he has materialized in Sydney, Australia. Graves tells him to find one of the agency's undercover agents, who has sent out a distress call from a nearby nightclub.

After rescuing the agent, Duke locates a doomsday weapon being created by the aliens. The controller alien in Egypt had mentioned it to be able to wipe out Earth's atmosphere, so Nukem is quickly sent to destroy the device. Once successful, he transports on board the orbiting alien spaceship.

Once Duke establishes his signal with general Graves, he learns that he must hack into the spaceship's system to find a weakness. After transmitting all the data from the ship he can find, Graves tells him they have detected four human females on board which Duke must once again rescue. He finds the first one and teleports her back to Earth, and after analysis, the general learns that she is in fact a cloned version of their undercover agent, Jenny. Duke deducts that the aliens are using the clones to help propagate their species.

By the time Duke has rescued Jenny's clones one by one, his general friend informs him that he can destroy the ship by shutting down its engine's coolant system. He does just that, then teleports "Jenny 5" back to Earth. The general's teleportation system is unable to beam out Duke Nukem too, however, requiring him to wade through more alien assailants in order to escape.

Duke is able to successfully escape the ship before it explodes, returning safely back to Earth. However, he declines to be debriefed by Graves, using a double entendre of the word "debrief" to claim that he already did so by having sex with Jenny 5.

== Development and release ==
Duke Nukem Advance was originally planned to be released in the fall of 2001 alongside Back Track and Doom as one of the first first-person shooters for the Game Boy Advance, but as that timeframe approached, the developers decided to delay Duke Nukem Advance by a year to avoid crunch and have more time to polish it and add missing features that were too important to leave out while attempting to rush the game to market.

More than 20 years later, Advance was released for the Evercade/VS platform via emulation as one of three games in Duke Nukem Collection 2, which was released on November 28, 2023.

== Reception ==
Reception

Aggregate score
Aggregator	Score
Metacritic	81/100

Review scores
Publication	Score
AllGame	2.5/5
Eurogamer	8/10
Game Informer	8.5/10
GamesMaster	85%
GameSpot	7.5/10
GameSpy	4.5/5
GameZone	9.1/10
IGN	9/10
Nintendo Power	3.9/5
X-Play	3/5

Duke Nukem Advance received "generally favourable" reviews, according to review aggregator Metacritic. Craig Harris of IGN called it "without a doubt the most fun first-person shooter on the GBA to date." Frank Provo of GameSpot said: "On the basis of technical merit, Duke Nukem Advance is nowhere near as pretty or diverse as the original 1996 PC game, but it's easily the best FPS to hit the GBA since Doom." Martin Taylor of Eurogamer said: "It breaks no new ground in gaming conventions, and it won't keep you playing for months, but it looks good and it plays well, which is more than can be said for some of its competition."

Duke Nukem Advance was a runner-up for GameSpot's annual "Best Sound on Game Boy Advance" award, which went to Aggressive Inline.
