= Duke Nukem: Critical Mass =

2011 video game

- Developer: Frontline Studios
- Publishers: Deep Silver; Apogee Software, LLC
- Series: Duke Nukem
- Platform: Nintendo DS
- Release: EU: April 8, 2011; NA: June 6, 2011; AU: July 7, 2011
- Genre: Shooter
- Modes: Single-player, multiplayer

Duke Nukem: Critical Mass is a shooter game developed by Frontline Studios and published by Deep Silver and Apogee Software, LLC for the Nintendo DS.

Development started on Critical Mass in 2008. A version for the PlayStation Portable began development, but it was never released. An unfinished copy of the game was discovered in 2014. Upon release, the game was panned by critics.

== Story ==
The Earth Defense Forces attempts to ensure the Earth's continued security by monitoring the future with the help of their own time machine, but both their agent and a special team sent there have been confirmed MIA. Knowing something is wrong, General Graves sends in the famous Duke Nukem.

== Gameplay ==
Duke Nukem: Critical Mass is largely a run and gun shooter game, however, several different game modes are available throughout the game. There are first-person shooting sequences when the player picks up a sniper rifle, and several third-person and top-down shooting elements. The boss battles are presented in pure third-person shooter gameplay. The game includes about 36 levels, many different weapon types, enemies, and bosses.

== Development ==
In July 2008, license holder Apogee Software, LLC released a four-minute teaser trailer at E3 2008 for a planned Duke Nukem Trilogy for the PlayStation Portable (PSP) and Nintendo DS. The trailer had no gameplay footage, but rather a series of logos and game-related art. A co-publishing deal was reached with Deep Silver to ensure wide distribution of the titles. In March 2009, Apogee attended the Game Developers Conference and showed the game off to GameSpot, which released a short video interview including some the gameplay for both versions recorded on a handheld camera. Duke was seen running around a city landscape from a third-person perspective in the PSP version of the game, and platforming through an environment while confined to a side-scroller style path on the DS version. In the interview, the fall of 2009 was said to be the target release period for both versions of the game. This event was followed by several updates about the game's progress by Apogee on Twitter during the following months, including one in which the voice recording sessions for the game with Duke Nukem voice actor Jon St. John were confirmed to have finished successfully.

The games announced to be included in the trilogy are Duke Nukem: Critical Mass, Duke Nukem: Chain Reaction, and Duke Nukem: Proving Grounds. The three games would have what Apogee calls "multi-mode", where players switch between third-person over the shoulder, first-person, isometric, and side-scrolling views. For Duke Nukem: Critical Mass, the DS and PSP versions were going to be unique games unified by the same basic story.

On October 29, 2010, developer Frontline Studios released news that Critical Mass for both platforms would no longer carry the Duke Nukem license and be renamed "Extraction Point: Alien Shootout". However, on March 23, 2011, Apogee Software announced that they never lost the license and would release Duke Nukem: Critical Mass for the Nintendo DS on April 8, 2011, in Europe. The PSP version of Critical Mass, and the two sequels were not released.

The source code of the unreleased PSP version of Critical Mass was discovered in 2014 to be preserved at the Library of Congress. It was later leaked to the public on April 4, 2022.

== Reception ==
Reception

Aggregate score
Aggregator	Score
Metacritic	29/100

Review scores
Publication	Score
GamesTM	4/10
NGamer	29%
Official Nintendo Magazine	29%
Metro	2/10

Duke Nukem: Critical Mass received "generally unfavorable" reviews, according to review aggregator Metacritic.
