= Duke Nukem Mobile =

Mobile video game series

Duke Nukem Mobile is the name given to two different games in the Duke Nukem series developed by American studio MachineWorks Northwest and produced by 3D Realms.

== Duke Nukem Mobile on Tapwave Zodiac ==
This is a first-person shooter that was released in May 2004 for the Tapwave Zodiac, which re-uses many sprites (e.g. enemies and HUD weapons) that were already used in Duke Nukem 3D and consists of 21 short levels set in locations such as streets, strip clubs, cemeteries, mansions and a futuristic dirigible. In order to pass from a level to the next it is necessary to kill the enemies that are present in the current level, until one of them drops a key card that will enable the access to the next level.

In Summer of 2005, this game was ported to mobile phones as Duke Nukem Mobile 3D and enhanced to include a mode where the enemies are rendered as polygonal models.

In spring of 2007, the game was re-released for mobile phones again, under the title Duke Nukem Arena. It added a new survival mode and up to 4-player multiplayer Deathmatch.

In April 2020, a Nintendo DS development cartridge containing a port of Duke Nukem Mobile 3D called "Duke Nukem DS" was sold on eBay. A YouTube video containing in-game footage was uploaded by the user DScapades on May 3, 2020.

== Duke Nukem Mobile on mobile phones ==
This is a scrolling shooter that was released on January 15, 2004, to play on Motorola T720, LGE VX4400, LGE VX4500, LGE VX6000 and Samsung SCH-A530, with original graphics. The game features 15 levels and its gameplay consists in killing all of the enemies until the end-level boss is reached. When the boss dies, it will drop a key card that will enable the access to the next level. Also, when Duke Nukem dies in the game, he screams the roar of the aliens from Duke Nukem 3D.

== Duke Nukem Mobile II: Bikini Project ==
In September 2005, a sequel called Duke Nukem Mobile II: Bikini Project was released for the same mobile phones. The game re-uses many sprites of its predecessor and takes place right after its end. The gameplay is the same, with new elements added such as the jetpack, the flamethrower, the pigcop jetcraft and multiple boss characters for some levels.
