= Jeffrey D. Erb =

American actor and director

- Born: Jeffrey David Erb; June 5, 1969 (age 57); Pottstown, Pennsylvania, United States
- Genres: Gothic rock; industrial rock; industrial metal; New wave; punk rock; alternative rock; hard rock
- Occupations: Producer; Director; Actor; Musician; Singer; Songwriter
- Instruments: Bass guitar; Vocals; Synthesizer; Rhythm Tracks
- Years active: 1986-present

Jeffrey D. Erb (born June 5, 1969, in Pottstown, Pennsylvania) is an American film producer, director, actor, musician. He is also the co-founder and co-president of the film production company Framelight Productions, the co-founder of Invivid Media and the CEO of Feverpitch Pictures. He has produced or executive produced a wide range of films, including The Speed of Life (Directed by Ed Radtke), which won an award at the Venice Film Festival.

Erb is known as a founding member and bass player of the gothic rock band Sri Lanka, which he founded in 1986 with his longtime collaborator Lee Daniels. In 1995 Erb and Daniels formed the industrial rock band Needle where Erb was singer, songwriter, bassplayer, keyboard player and wrote rhythm tracks.

== Early life ==
Erb was born in Pottstown, Pennsylvania, the oldest of two children, with sibling Pamela. Erb's mother, Susanne Gresh, is a real estate agent, and Erb's father, David Erb, was an managing operator at a power plant owned by Philadelphia Electric Company. His parents divorced in 1977. His father is of German ancestry, and his mother is of Irish, English, and German descent. Erb's ancestors on his father's side emigrated to the United States in the early 1700s and fought in both the Revolutionary War and the Civil War.

Erb spent the first four years following his parents' divorce living with his mother in Reading, Pennsylvania, and the next several living with his father in Malvern, Pennsylvania, where he graduated from Great Valley High School. He attended college at Kutztown University in Kutztown, Pennsylvania.

== Musical career ==
Mr. Erb started his musical career in 1987 as the founder and bass player of the band Sri Lanka, a gothic rock band from the City of Philadelphia, Pennsylvania. The band was originally formed by Erb and Lee Daniels, whom Erb had known since they were 15 years old. After a tumultuous series of interactions with other members, including the death of original lead singer Brett Turner, the release of two EPs and a full-length album entitled "Here" the band split up.

In 1995 Erb and Daniels got back together to form the band Needle, (stylized as "[needle]") an industrial rock band combining edgy guitars with dance rhythms. The band obtained distribution through Sony Music Entertainment via its Ruffhouse Records label. The band's debut album "Lifeline" met with critical praise and the band proceeded to perform live with major acts in cities throughout North America. Jeffrey Erb and Lee Daniels write all of the music for the band, with Erb performing lead vocals and Daniels on lead guitar. Their live sets include several additional band members on bass guitar, drums and keyboards.

== Film career ==
Mr. Erb has produced numerous films, including Just Add Water (film) (Danny DeVito, Jonah Hill, Dylan Walsh, Justin Long), which was the first film ever to receive a Green Seal from the Environmental Media Association. Erb has also produced Southern Gothic (Yul Vazquez, William Forsythe (actor)), The Speed of Life (Directed by Ed Radtke), Tooth and Nail (film) (Michael Madsen, Vinnie Jones, Robert Carradine, Rider Strong, Rachel Miner), and Let the Game Begin (Thomas Ian Nicholas, Adam Rodriguez, Lisa Ray, Lochlyn Munro, and Stephen Baldwin).

In 2008, he founded Framelight Productions with partner Robert L. Robinson, Jr., a company focused on the theatrical production of comic book properties and novels and television shows. Some of the first properties optioned by the company included Deadworld, published by Caliber Press and Image Comics, and created by Gary Reed, and Dr. Deth With Kip and Muffy, published by Marvel Comics and created by famed GI Joe author, Larry Hama; as well as 8 others. He brought Bill Mechanic, former CEO of Fox Filmed Entertainment on board to produce Deadworld with Framelight and David Hayter to write the screenplay.

Prior to founding Feverpitch Pictures, Mr. Erb was President of Kindred Media Group, where he had overseen the release of a number of films, including Game 6 (Michael Keaton, Robert Downey Jr., Griffin Dunne) and Jailbait (Michael Pitt, Stephen Adly Guirgis).

In 2011, Jeffrey Erb launched Invivid Media, a company focusing on developing, producing and distributing branded entertainment across an emerging converged media landscape. His partners in the project include former Johnson & Johnson Global Media Director, Michael Giarraputo as well as Howard Nelson, former Vice President of Worldwide Promotion, Marketing and Publicity for 20th Century Fox. The company's Board includes Patricia Wyatt, former President of Hit Entertainment and 20th Century Fox Consumer Products; Hal Sadoff, senior partner at International Creative Management; Ray Rotolo, COO of Aegis Media–owned Posterscope; Jason Piette, founding partner of Stealth Media, Spice Factory, and Arclight; and Mort Goldberg, CEO of Gamma Communications.

The company's projects include a web-based reality show called "Making the Squad with the Philadelphia Eagles Cheerleaders" which Erb directed, as well as two other web-series including "Eye on Celebrity" which Erb directed and "Knerd Knews" which Erb executive produced.

In 2015, Erb launched Ironbound Studios Minnesota with political fundraiser and businessman Jerry Seppala, in order to establish a base infrastructure for the burgeoning film industry taking place in Minnesota's Iron Range. The studio provides 20,000-square-foot (1,900 m^{2}) of studio space and 34,000-square-foot (3,200 m^{2}) of support space including offices, dressing rooms, screening rooms, green room, food services lighting & grip equipment, post-production facilities and a vocational school to train film & media students.

== Selected Credits ==
=== Producer ===
- Just Add Water (film): Executive Producer
- Tooth and Nail (film): Executive Producer
- Deadworld: Producer

=== Actor ===
- Tooth and Nail (film): Skinny Man
