= Starwinder =

1996 video game

- North American cover art of Starwinder
- Developer: Mindscape
- Publisher: Mindscape
- Platform: PlayStation
- Release: NA: October 30, 1996; EU: January 1997
- Genre: Racing
- Mode: Single-player

Starwinder is a sci-fi racing video game for the PlayStation. The gameplay involves obtaining power ups and slowing down opponents, in order to reach the finish line first, similar to that of the Wipeout series. There are 10 sectors containing 5 tracks each, with a total of 40 race tracks. There are 7 usable ships, with every track competed by the player unlocking a new ship. Unlike most racing games, the player can steer off the course away from the track at the cost of lowered speed.

Players step into the shoes of Connor Rhodes, ace pilot of Earth as he competes against aliens around the galaxy. Each has its own personality and ship. The game features pre-rendered cutscenes between each race.

== Plot ==
117 million years ago, the Rails, which are narrow tracks thousands of miles long, were constructed by unknown life forms, with their purpose unclear. The Rails are half open, winding tubes with a red power strip along one side that boosts a ship's speed the closer it flies to it. They were transformed into massive race tracks, on which the 43 known civilizations of the galaxy compete for the right to be called "the champion". The prize at the end of championship is the Star Sphere, assembled from 43 stones found at each track, forming a near-perfect globe, still incomplete, as it has one piece missing. Five centuries ago, a 44th Rail was discovered, orbiting a dying star, but it doesn't contain the missing piece. Even so, the racers must compete at this last Rail, located at Epsilon Indi. The actual championship welcomes the first racer from Earth, Connor Rhodes, as he competes for the Star Sphere.

At the end of the game, Rhodes wins the championship and the Star Sphere. It is revealed that he has the last piece of the globe. As he fits it in the sphere's empty space, it glows and exits the ship, departing to an unknown location. Rhodes gives chase, eventually arriving to Earth's asteroid belt as the sphere forms the last hidden rail, made of asteroids. Rhodes races through it to the end, where seems to be a dead end. Both the sphere and the ship collide, leaving no remains as they seemingly explode. The mystery of the Rails is left unrevealed, though some say that Rhodes, before colliding, discovered their secret.

It is revealed that Rhodes survived, as he was teleported to another place that could be either a different dimension or a distant part of the universe, just before another ship race starts.

== Gameplay ==
The player chooses one of the two starter ships (the other three can be obtained as the sectors are completed) to race in 11 sectors with four races each, except for the last one, that only contains one.

The player can shoot with various weapons which ammunition can be obtained as one goes racing through the tracks. These shots are used to destroy the drones or to hinder the progress of the other ships. Even though there is a way to shoot and there is the possibility of being shot by other ships, there is no damage meter, nor a way of destroy the ships with pilots or be destroyed.

== Reception ==
Reception

Review scores
Publication	Score
Electronic Gaming Monthly	5.625/10
GameSpot	4.1/10
Next Generation	3/5

Starwinder received mediocre reviews, with critics generally commenting that the tracks are too short and differ in little more than the background graphics, leading to gameplay which is overly easy and repetitive. While Next Generation and Electronic Gaming Monthly offered some praise for the graphics and the strategy added by the ability to leave the track at the cost of reduced speed, Tom Ham of GameSpot called the graphics mediocre and contended that staying on the track is the best strategy in every situation, making the gameplay essentially restrictive as well as repetitive. Scary Larry of GamePro called Starwinder "a mediocre, barely enjoyable race", and Next Generation concluded that "the control of the ships and play mechanics simply aren't varied or engaging enough to hold one's attention for very long."
