= Duke Nukem: Time to Kill =

1998 video game

- North American box art
- Developer: n-Space
- Publisher: GT Interactive
- Director: Vic Merritt
- Producer: Dan O'Leary
- Designer: Ted Newman
- Programmer: Chris Cammack
- Artist: Bradley Weckman
- Composer: Jeff Mac
- Series: Duke Nukem
- Platform: PlayStation
- Release: NA: October 15, 1998; EU: November 3, 1998
- Genre: Third-person shooter
- Modes: Single-player, multiplayer

Duke Nukem: Time to Kill is a 1998 third-person shooter video game developed by n-Space and published by GT Interactive for the PlayStation. It received mostly positive reviews.

== Gameplay ==
The gameplay and controls are very similar to those of Tomb Raider, though with an emphasis on action rather than on exploration. The game humorously references Tomb Raider throughout, as well as The Evil Dead, Monty Python and the Holy Grail, the Back to the Future series, The Good, the Bad and the Ugly and the song "I Got You (I Feel Good)" by James Brown.

The game also features a two-player deathmatch option, where two players can battle against each other in environments loosely based on the single-player stages referring to the different time periods. The multiplayer stages can also be accessed in the single-player game by finding stopwatches or 'Surprises.' If these hidden items are found, the player is given an opportunity to take on a horde of enemies in the multiplayer stages using an upgraded version of the current weapon used, with the prize for completion being to keep the upgrade for the remainder of the game.

== Plot ==
The game opens with an introduction video sequence of Duke riding his motorbike towards the Bootylicious Strip Club in downtown Los Angeles, only to find the Pig Cops teleporting in to disrupt his fun, turning his motorcycle into a pink child's bicycle. Duke takes out the Pig Cops and the game begins. The video sequence is accompanied by the song "The Thing I Hate" by Stabbing Westward. Apparently, an alien race called the Draks are causing havoc in Earth's timeline, and are aiming to kill Duke. It's up to him now to clean up the timeline.

The first stage of the game is a hub stage. It is an "inner city" composed of the strip club, a subway, an apartment and manufacturing plant. On each visit to the hub stage, the appearance and enemies change slightly, and the dancers in the strip club change from women to mutated pigs and even men, Duke can kill the dancers, which leads to Mutated Pigs teleporting in, resulting in humorous comments from a disgusted Duke. The objectives of the hub stages are to find 3 key crystals (hidden in a different location each time) and use them to operate a Time-Space Warp that Duke must use to travel to the Old West, Medieval Europe, and Ancient Rome. In each scenario, Duke finds evidence of Draks and their pig minions period dress attempting to change history in their favor.

Duke encounters several stages of action before a final confrontation against an enormous end boss. Duke clears out all three time periods, defeating all opposition, including powerful monsters such as "The Reaper", Duke also encounters a dragon referred to as "Wing'd Death". In the end, Duke encounters the Drak leader, Moloch the Gate Keeper and then kills him. With his enemies eliminated, Duke returns to his time. This game was followed up with Duke Nukem: Land of the Babes, and a game was made for the Nintendo 64 called Duke Nukem: Zero Hour.

== Development ==
According to n-Space executive producer Erich Dyke, in 1997 publisher GT Interactive approached n-Space and asked if they were interested in creating a new Duke Nukem game.

Due to its similarity to Tomb Raider, Duke Nukem: Time to Kill was internally nicknamed "Duke Raider". 3D Realms, the developer of the previous games in the series, provided creative input and oversight throughout development.

The game was re-released on the Evercade/VS platform as part of the Duke Nukem Collection 2 in November 2023.

== Reception ==
Reception

Aggregate score
Aggregator	Score
GameRankings	75%

Review scores
Publication	Score
CNET Gamecenter	8/10
Electronic Gaming Monthly	6.625/10 (Note: Four critics of Electronic Gaming Monthly gave the game each a score of 4/10, 8.5/10, 7.5/10 and 6.5/10.)
EP Daily	6.5/10
Game Informer	8.5/10
GameRevolution	B+
GameSpot	7.5/10
IGN	8/10
Jeuxvideo.com	16/20
Next Generation	4/5
Official U.S. PlayStation Magazine	3.5/5

Duke Nukem: Time to Kill received "generally favourable" reviews, according to review aggregator GameRankings. Next Generation said that the game was "in many ways a bold move for GT Interactive, 3D Realms, and N-Space. This title shows that the Duke Nukem series is capable of change and can do it successfully. But whether Duke Nukem fans across the world will really ever accept this type of game has yet to be seen. In our opinion, though, they should." Air Hendrix of GamePro said, "If only the graphics were a little more clean and the controls a little more crisp, Duke might've stood alongside Lara [Croft]. Still, those flaws shouldn't stop you from checking out Time to Kill—Duke's brand of explor-action is gripping enough to show you a wild time." (Note: GamePro gave the game 3.5/5 for graphics, 5/5 for sound, and two 4/5 scores for control and fun factor.)
