= Duke Nukem Forever =

2011 video game

- North American cover art
- Developer: Gearbox Software (Note: Additional development by 3D Realms, Piranha Games and Triptych Games)
- Publisher: 2K (Note: Published to Mac by Aspyr)
- Directors: Bryan Ekman; George Broussard
- Producers: Mike Wardwell; Geoff Gordon; Matthew Newman; Brian Hook
- Writers: Valeta Wensloff; Kristen Haglund; David Riegel
- Composer: Eric Von Rothkirch
- Series: Duke Nukem
- Engine: Unreal Engine (heavily modified as "Duke Engine")
- Platforms: Windows; PlayStation 3; Xbox 360; Mac OS X
- Release: Windows, PS3, Xbox 360; EU/AU: June 10, 2011; NA: June 14, 2011; Mac OS X; WW: August 18, 2011
- Genre: First-person shooter
- Modes: Single-player, multiplayer

Duke Nukem Forever is a 2011 first-person shooter game developed by Gearbox Software and published by 2K for Windows, PlayStation 3, Xbox 360 and Mac OS X. It is the fourth main game in the Duke Nukem series and the sequel to Duke Nukem 3D (1996). Players control Duke Nukem as he comes out of retirement to battle an alien invasion. Like its predecessor, Duke Nukem Forever features pop culture references, toilet humor, and adult content.

Duke Nukem Forever began development under 3D Realms and underwent a protracted development that lasted 14 years. Announced in 1997 following the success of Duke Nukem 3D, it was delayed several times, which was attributed to engine changes, understaffing, and a lack of a development plan. After 3D Realms downsized in 2009, Duke Nukem Forever was finished by Triptych Games, Gearbox Software, and Piranha Games. At time of release, it held the Guinness world record for the longest development for a video game.

Duke Nukem Forever was released on June 14, 2011, and received mostly unfavorable reviews, with criticism for its graphics, dated humor and story, simplistic mechanics, and unpolished performance and design. It did not meet sales expectations but was deemed profitable by Take-Two Interactive, the owner of 2K Games. An additional episode, The Doctor Who Cloned Me, was released as downloadable content in December.

== Gameplay ==
Duke Nukem Forever is a first-person shooter that combines combat, exploration and puzzle-solving. The game also switches to a third-person view when in vehicle use. Players control Duke Nukem, a 1980s-style action hero, as he battles alien invaders through three main locations: Las Vegas, a highway and Hoover Dam. Some areas feature boss fights, fetch quests and driving sequences; in one sequence, Duke is shrunk to a miniature size and drives a toy car. Minigames include air hockey, whack-a-mole and pinball.

Forever is slower than previous Duke Nukem games. As in the Halo series, players can only carry two weapons at a time, and Duke's health regenerates automatically. The weapons include a shotgun, trip mines, a shrink ray (which shrinks enemies so Duke can stomp on them) and a freeze ray (which freezes enemies so Duke can shatter them). Like Duke Nukem 3D, Forever includes pop culture references, toilet humor and adult content, such as strip clubs and the ability to urinate. In the multiplayer mode, players compete in games such as deathmatch, capture the flag and king of the hill.

== Plot ==
Twelve years after he saved the Earth from an alien invasion, (Note: As depicted in Duke Nukem 3D (1996)) Duke Nukem has become a celebrity multimillionaire. After playing a game based on Duke Nukem 3D, he arrives on the set of a talk show for an interview. On his way to the show, Duke witnesses a news broadcast announcing that aliens have returned. Unlike previous encounters, the aliens initially appear peaceful and at first, seem to pose no harm to the humans of Earth.

Duke's talk show appearance is canceled to allow television stations to cover the alien invasion, and Duke retires to the "Duke Cave", his home. There, he receives a call from the president and General Graves of the Earth Defense Force (EDF). The president orders Duke not to harm the invaders and adds that he is in diplomatic talks with the alien overlord.

When Duke is attacked by hostile aliens, Duke is forced to disobey the president's orders and fight his way through the alien hordes. While fighting through his casino, Duke witnesses the aliens abducting women, including his two pop-star girlfriends. Graves tells Duke that the women are being held in the Duke Dome and that the aliens have a vendetta to settle with Duke. He also warns Duke that the aliens are using Hoover Dam to power a wormhole so more aliens can come through. Duke travels to the Duke Dome, using a wrecking ball to damage the building to gain access. Inside, he finds swarms of Octabrains and the missing women, who have been impregnated with alien spawn. Duke's girlfriends die after bearing alien babies, infuriating Duke. Duke finds the Alien Queen in control of the Duke Dome and kills her, but is wounded in the process and blacks out.

After regaining consciousness, Duke fights Pigcops and aliens through the Duke Burger. He travels to the Hoover Dam in his monster truck. After battling through the dam, he finds his old friend Dylan, mortally wounded. Dylan tells Duke that the reborn Cycloid Emperor is at the dam and that the only way to shut down the portal is to completely destroy it. Before dying, he gives Duke his demolition charges and wishes him luck. Duke places the explosives and destroys the dam, but the currents nearly drown him.

Duke is revived by an EDF soldier and awakens to find the portal gone. The president, who was also at the dam, rages at Duke for ruining his plans to work with the Cycloid Emperor. The president was actually intending to have the aliens kill Duke so he could control the Earth with Cycloid Emperor. He has ordered a nuclear strike at the site of the dam to wipe out the remaining aliens, intending to leave Duke there to die. The Cycloid Emperor emerges and kills the president and his security detail; he intended to kill the president after the deal. Duke kills the Cycloid Emperor and is rescued by Graves as the nuclear bomb explodes. In a press conference, Duke announces his intent to run for President of the United States.

=== The Doctor Who Cloned Me ===
In the downloadable content The Doctor Who Cloned Me, Duke wakes up after the nuclear explosion and finds himself trapped in a strange laboratory while video recordings of himself declaring his bid for Presidency play on monitors. After escaping, Duke discovers that not only are the aliens continuing their invasion, but his old nemesis Dr. Proton is building an army of robotic Duke clones to fight the aliens and conquer Earth himself.

Duke infiltrates Proton's laboratory in Area 51 by posing as one of the clones. Eventually, Proton spots him and attacks Duke but he escapes and is reunited with Dylan (revealed as still alive). With Dylan's help, Duke locates and kills Dr. Proton. General Graves then communicates with Duke to inform him that the aliens are being bred by an Alien Empress that is nesting on the moon. After finding a teleporter leading to the moon, Duke commandeers a lunar rover and destroys the Alien Empress, saving Earth and its women once again.

== Development ==
=== Announcement ===
In 1996, 3D Realms released Duke Nukem 3D. Distinguished from other first-person shooter games by its adult humor and interactive world, it received acclaim and sold around 3.5 million copies. The 3D Realms co-founder George Broussard announced the sequel, Duke Nukem Forever, on April 27, 1997, which he expected to be released by Christmas 1998. It was widely anticipated. The 3D Realms co-founder Scott Miller said the Duke Nukem franchise would last for decades across many iterations, like James Bond or Mario. Broussard and Miller funded Duke Nukem Forever using the profits from Duke Nukem 3D and other games. They gave the marketing and publishing rights to GT Interactive, taking only a $400,000 advance. 3D Realms also began developing a 2D version of Duke Nukem Forever, which was canceled due to the rising popularity of 3D games.

=== Engine changes and delays ===
Rather than create a new game engine, 3D Realms began development using id Software's Quake II engine. They demonstrated the first Duke Nukem Forever trailer at the E3 convention in May 1998. Critics were impressed by its cinematic presentation and action scenes, with combat on a moving truck. According to staff, Broussard became obsessed with incorporating new technology and features from competing games and could not bear for Duke Nukem Forever to be perceived as outdated. Weeks after E3, he announced that 3D Realms had switched to Unreal Engine, a new engine with better rendering capabilities for large spaces, requiring a reboot of the project. In 1999, they switched engines again, to a newer version of Unreal Engine.

By 2000, Duke Nukem Forever was still far from complete. A developer who joined that year described it as a series of chaotic tech demos, and the staff felt that Broussard had no fixed idea of what the final game would be. As the success of Duke Nukem 3D meant that 3D Realms did not require external funding, they lacked deadlines or financial pressure that could have driven the project. Broussard became defiant in response to questions from fans and journalists, saying it would be released "when it's done". In December 2000, the rights to publish Duke Nukem Forever were purchased by Take-Two Interactive, which hoped to release it the following year. By 2001, Duke Nukem Forever was being cited as a high-profile case of vaporware, and Wired gave it the "vaporware of the year" award.

At E3 2001, 3D Realms released another trailer, the first public view of Duke Nukem Forever in three years. The response was positive, and the team was elated, feeling they were ahead of their competitors. However, Broussard still failed to present a vision for a final product. One employee felt that Miller and Broussard were developing "with a 1995 mentality", with a team much smaller than those of other major games of the time. By 2003, only 18 people were working on Duke Nukem Forever full time. According to Miller, 3D Realms rejected an offer from the Canadian studio Digital Extremes to take over the project in 2004. Miller, who had been in favor of the offer, later described this as a "fatal suicide shot". However, Digital Extreme's COO, Sheldon Carter, later said Digital Extremes were busy developing The Darkness 2 and BioShock and could not have taken on a third game.

In a 2006 presentation, Broussard told a journalist the team had "fucked up" and had restarted development. By August that year, around half the team had left, frustrated by the lack of progress. In 2007, 3D Realms hired Raphael van Lierop as the new creative director. He was impressed by the game and felt it could be finished within a year, but Broussard disagreed. 3D Realms hired aggressively to expand the team to about 35 people. Brian Hook, the new creative lead, became the first employee to push back against Broussard.

=== Layoffs and Gearbox takeover ===
In 2009, with 3D Realms having exhausted its capital, Miller and Broussard asked Take-Two for $6 million to finish the game. After no agreement was reached, Broussard and Miller laid off the team and ceased development. A small team of ex-employees, which later became Triptych Games, continued development from their homes.

In September 2010, Gearbox Software announced that it had bought the Duke Nukem intellectual property from 3D Realms and would continue development of Duke Nukem Forever. The Gearbox team included several members of the 3D Realms team, but not Broussard. On May 24, 2011, Gearbox announced that Duke Nukem Forever had "gone gold" after 15 years. It holds the Guinness world record for the longest development for a video game, at 14 years and 44 days, though this period was exceeded in 2022 by Beyond Good and Evil 2 and in 2024 by the Game Boy Advance game Kien.

In 2022, Miller released a blog post on the Apogee website about 3D Realms' failure to complete Duke Nukem Forever. He attributed it to understaffing, repeated engine changes and a lack of planning. On Twitter, Broussard responded that Miller's claims were "nonsense", described him as manipulative and narcissistic, and accused him of blaming others. He blamed Miller for the loss of 3D Realms and the Duke Nukem intellectual property.

== Marketing and release ==
The Duke Nukem Forever launch trailer was released on June 2, 2011. A playable demo was released on June 3, 2011. Duke Nukem Forever was released in a special "Balls of Steel" edition, with items including a five-inch bust of Duke Nukem, a 100-page artbook, a comic, stickers and poker chips. Themes and avatars were also sold for the Xbox 360 and PlayStation 3.

2K Games launched a website titled "Boob Tube" to promote the game. On May 19, 2011, a Flash game was released on the website, Duke Nudem, whereby players shoot targets against a woman. If successful, her clothing is removed until she is topless. 2K released a Duke Nukem Forever soundboard for iOS, including a number of Duke Nukem's phrases. Duke Nukem Forever was made available a day early on June 9 from all retailers after the street date was broken. It was released in Japan on March 29, 2012. In December 2018, Duke Nukem Forever was made available on the Xbox digital store, with compatibility with Xbox One and Xbox Series through the Xbox backwards compatibility program.

== Downloadable content ==
In North America, the video game retailer GameStop promised exclusive in-game content for customers pre-ordering Duke Nukem Forever. The exclusive content, known as "Duke's Big Package", gave the player access "Big Heads", the "Ego Boost", and custom in-game T-shirts. A code printed on the final receipt could be activated over Xbox Live, PlayStation Network, and Steam. The Hail to the Icons Parody Pack was released on October 11, 2011, on the PlayStation Network, Xbox Live, and Steam. It adds three game modes and four multiplayer maps, each with new weapons.

A new single-player campaign, The Doctor Who Cloned Me, was released on December 13, 2011. It sees the return of Duke's nemesis from the original Duke Nukem game, Dr. Proton, and adds weapons, enemies, bosses and multiplayer maps. It holds a score of 52/100 on Metacritic for PC and 58/100 for Xbox 360. GameSpy rated it 1.5/5, OXM rated it 4/10 and Eurogamer rated it 5/10. Eurogamer wrote: "Duke's trying his best, but there's still too much of the past hanging around and holding him back."

== Reception ==
=== Critical reception ===
Reception

Aggregate score
Aggregator	Score
Metacritic	(PC) 54/100 (PS3) 51/100 (X360) 49/100

Review scores
Publication	Score
1Up.com	F
Destructoid	2/10
Edge	3/10
Eurogamer	3/10
Game Informer	6.75/10
GamePro	3/5
GameRevolution	D+
GameSpot	(PC) 3.5/10 (X360) 3/10
GameSpy	2.5/5
GamesRadar+	6/10
GameTrailers	5.4/10
IGN	5.5/10
Joystiq	2/5
PALGN	5/10
PC Gamer (US)	80/100
X-Play	1/5

On the review aggregation site Metacritic, Duke Nukem Forever has a range score between 49–54/100, indicating "mixed or average reviews" on the PC and PlayStation 3 versions and "generally unfavorable reviews" on the Xbox 360 version. Criticism focused on the long loading times, clunky controls, offensive humor and dated design. The critics Elton Jones of Complex, James Stephanie Sterling of Destructoid and Ben "Yahtzee" Croshaw, creator of Zero Punctuation, named it among the worst games of the year.

Many critics disliked the level design and shooting. Kevin VanOrd of GameSpot felt that the "joy" of the Duke Nukem 3D combat had been "flattened", with "little sense of impact", and found the design tedious. He called Duke Nukem Forever a "bad, boring, bargain bin kind of game". Eurogamer wrote that the locations lacked the "exploration and excitement that made Duke 3D such a memorable experience", and that the levels were too linear, with "huge chunks of the game ... spent simply walking from one fight to another through uninspired corridors". IGN felt the shooting was "simple fun", but criticized the platforming sequences, which "make up an unnecessarily large percentage of the story mode". GamesRadar concluded that the "world-record development time has produced an ugly, buggy shooter that veers back and forth between enjoyably average and outright boring, with occasional surges of greatness along the way". GamePro felt that "unexpected moments ... are really the game's biggest strengths. But they're few and far between."

Many reviewers questioned the design choices in comparison to Duke Nukem 3D, with Kotaku writing: "Old-school shooters, and this is definitely trying to be one of those with its basic AI and lack of cover mechanics, always had two great things going for them: speed and a ridiculous arsenal of weapons... Forever eschews this in favour of a plodding pace and two guns." The Escapist agreed: "Having been almost cryo-frozen for more than a decade, then awoken and peppered with modern touches, Duke Nukem Forever feels so out of place."

Another common criticism was with the game's lack of technical sophistication, including inconsistent graphics and unacceptably long loading times, which GameTrailers called "unholy"; Eric Neigher of GameSpy found the console versions took up to 40 seconds to load a level. Neigher also criticized the game's multiplayer mode as unplayable without serious lag spikes. Edge wrote that "the myriad technical shortcomings – particularly prevalent on the console ports – only get worse the further you progress into the campaign", a view echoed by Game Revolution: "when they started on the design, that tech was already outdated". The PC version has since been patched to greatly decrease loading times and to add two optional inventory slots.

The use of the series' trademark humor received a mixed response. In one regard, some critics such as Team Xbox praised the voice work of Jon St. John, who did an "excellent job as always with Duke's persona", while others such as Machinima.com appreciated the comedic gameplay tips and pop culture references. However, the same critic also noted that "parts of the narrative and dialogue show clear evidence of the game's elongated development. Many pop culture references refer to media in the early 2000s, with one-liners co-opted from 'guy' movies like Old School, Highlander, and Commando, which in itself could cause blank stares from most of the current potential audience." The Australian website PALGN felt the game was "saved only by its humor and nostalgic value".

Several critics objected to the depiction of women; X-Play described it as "creepy" and hateful. Joystiq wrote that the multiplayer mode "Capture the Babe", which involves spanking women, "really is as painful as it sounds". The hive level, in which Duke encounters abducted women who have been forcibly impregnated with aliens, attracted particular criticism. GamesRadar listed it and its disembodied "wall boobs", which the player can slap, among the worst moments. Croshaw found that the level was "as jarring a shift of tone as you can get without splicing five minutes of The Human Centipede into the middle of Mallrats". Destructoid wrote: "Duke does not come across as cool, witty or likeable in the least. He comes across as a vile, callous, thoroughly detestable psychopath ... According to Gearbox, seeing women tortured was funny enough." Official Xbox Magazine thought that the humor was not "so much offensive or misogynistic as just suffering from an adolescent fixation with boobs and crowbarred-in innuendo". The Kusoge of the Year Wiki named Duke Nukem Forever one of the worst games of 2012. (Note: Duke Nukem Forever released in 2012 in Japan.)

Critics cited the long development time as a factor in the finished product. In a positive review PC Gamer noted that "years of anticipation will spoil Duke Nukem Forever for some", adding, "There's no reinvention of the genre here, no real attempt at grandeur... Check unrealistic expectations at the door and forget the ancient, hyperbolic promises of self-deluded developers", and concluded, "Don't expect a miracle. Duke is still the hero we love, but struggles to keep up with modern times." Game Informer, while disappointed in the game, concluded: "I'm glad Gearbox stepped up and finished this game, but after hearing about it for 12 years, I have no desire to relive any of it again. I'm now satisfied in my knowledge of what Duke Nukem Forever is and ready to never talk about it again. Welcome back, Duke. I hope your next game (which is teased after the credits) goes off without a hitch." Giant Bomb concluded that for those "part of that faction that finds yourself so fascinated by this whole project that you need to know how it ends, I recommend you play Duke Nukem Forever for yourself. But I'd practically insist that you do so on the PC and try to wait for a sale. If you're not willing to play a sloppy, cobbled together first-person shooter just because it has some kind of weird historical meaning, though, just forget this ever happened and move on." Jake Denton of Computer and Video Games wrote that parts of the game were fun to play and listed it as one of the "5 most underrated games of 2011", while admitting the game's overall faulty structure. Joseph Milne of FPSguru.com featured the game on his list of "Top 5 underrated games" at number 4 on the list.

=== Sales ===
According to research firm NPD, Duke Nukem Forever sold 376,300 units in its first month, not including digital copies. Take-Two Interactive, the parent company of 2K Games, revealed in July 2011 that the game sales were half of their initial expectations. However, in an earnings call on August 8, 2011, Take-Two said that Duke Nukem Forever would prove profitable.

== Legacy ==
The Escapist included Duke Nukem Forever in its 2016 list of the worst games ever, calling it "an example of what happens when the hype is far greater than the quality of the game". In 2021, Destructoid wrote that reactions had "ranged from negative to 'I guess it could have been worse'", and that much of the failure was down to its imitation of the first-person shooter games and that it lacked "self-awareness". Screen Rant attributed the negative reaction to the long development, and that the series' humor had become less acceptable.

=== Leaks ===
On May 9, 2022, an unfinished version of Duke Nukem Forever from 2001, including the level editor and the full source code, leaked online. Broussard confirmed its authenticity on Twitter, stating that he did not know who had leaked it and that "there is no real game to play". Miller, in a post on the Apogee website, wrote that "anyone expecting much of a playable game will be disappointed". The leak includes a version of Duke Nukem 3D's first level that ends with a sequence taken from the television series Twin Peaks.

Covering the leak for Ars Technica, Sam Machkovech found that the gunfights were "surprisingly solid", with "punchy sound design and powerful weapons", and resembled the Soldier of Fortune series. He wrote that the large environments, such as casinos, were built to a realistic scale and "play out like a confused team coming to grips with brand-new engine technology, simply building out larger-than-usual levels without yet getting to the crucial stages of balancing".

A fan mod, the Duke Nukem Forever: Restoration Project, aims to update the leak to a more complete state. An early version of the mod, called "The First Slice", was released in December 2022. A version of the canceled 2D version of Duke Nukem Forever from 1996 leaked that month.
