= Duke Nukem II =

1993 video game

- Developer: Apogee Software
- Publishers: Apogee Software: GT Interactive (GBC); Interceptor Entertainment (iOS); Gearbox Entertainment (remaster)
- Designers: Todd Replogle; George Broussard; Scott Miller; Allen H. Blum III
- Artists: Randy Abraham; Stephen A. Hornback
- Writer: Tom Hall
- Composer: Robert Prince
- Series: Duke Nukem
- Platforms: DOS, Game Boy Color, Windows, OS X, iOS, Linux, Evercade
- Release: December 3, 1993: DOS; NA: December 3, 1993; EU: 1993; Game Boy Color; NA: September 2, 1999; EU: October 1999; Windows, OS X; WW: December 6, 2012; iOS; WW: April 2, 2013; Linux; WW: May 21, 2015; Remastered; Evercade; WW: November 28, 2023
- Genre: Platform
- Mode: Single-player

Duke Nukem II is a 1993 platform game developed and published by Apogee Software. The game consists of four episodes (of eight levels each), the first available as shareware. It is the follow-up to 1991's Duke Nukem, and followed by Duke Nukem 3D in 1996. Todd Replogle was the primary designer of all three games.

== Gameplay ==
Gameplay

The player's goal is to proceed through the levels collecting items, destroying enemies to the level exit and at the final level, defeat the super alien boss. In one level of each episode Duke needs to destroy radar dishes to progress.

Duke Nukem can pick up weapons along the way. There are four types of weapons: His regular default gun, the flamethrower (which can shoot through walls and launch him in the air), the laser (which can shoot through anything) and the rocket launcher. Duke can also get a rapid fire powerup. Health items can be collected to heal damage Duke receives or to boost score points at full health. Keycards need to be collected to access past the force fields and keys must be obtained to get past locked doors. A cloaking device makes Duke temporarily invincible and disables the super force fields.

Movement through the levels mainly consists of jumping onto platforms, climbing ladders, operating elevators, using teleporters, hovering over blowing fans and climbing hand-over-hand across pipes or girders. At the end of every level (with the exception of the last level in each episode), the player can receive up to seven 100,000-point bonuses, earned by making certain achievements in the level, such as destroying all cameras.

== Plot ==
In 1998, an evil alien race, the Rigelatins, plan to enslave Earth, and they kidnap Duke Nukem during his appearance on The Oprah Winfrey Show in the city Neo LA (in GBC Nerola City), to extract his brain and use it to power an artificial intelligence that will ensure victory for their forces. Using his "Explodo-Molar"— a dental implant that can be used as an impact-detonated grenade— Duke escapes from his cell and fights across the planet's surface and underground, successfully destroying the Rigelatins' energy reactor and then their mothership before stealing a fighter jet to return to Earth.

== Development ==
The game took almost two years to create. It uses VGA and EGA graphics and draws two backgrounds that scroll in parallax.

== Reception ==
Reception

Aggregate scores
| Aggregator | Score |
|---|---|
| GameRankings | GBC: 73% |
| Metacritic | IOS: 50/100 |

Review score
| Publication | Score |
|---|---|
| PC Zone | 4/5 |

PC Zone gave Duke Nukem II 4 out of 5 stars. Allgame gave it 3 out of 5 stars for the original and 4 out of 5 for the Game Boy Color version.

== Legacy ==
Duke Nukem Collection 1, which includes remastered versions of Duke Nukem and Duke Nukem II alongside a port of Duke Nukem: Total Meltdown, was released for the Evercade retrogaming console in November 2023.
