= Duke Nukem (video game) =

1991 video game

- Episode 1 title screen
- Developer: Apogee Software
- Publisher: Apogee Software
- Producer: Scott Miller
- Designers: Todd Replogle; Scott Miller; Allen H. Blum III
- Programmer: Todd Replogle
- Artists: George Broussard; Jim Norwood; Allen H. Blum III
- Composer: Scott Miller
- Series: Duke Nukem
- Platforms: MS-DOS; Windows; OS X; Linux; Evercade
- Release: MS-DOS; NA: July 1, 1991; EU: 1992; Windows, OS X; WW: December 6, 2012; Linux; WW: May 21, 2015; Evercade; WW: November 28, 2023
- Genre: Platform
- Mode: Single-player

Duke Nukem is a 1991 platform game developed and published by Apogee Software for MS-DOS. The 2D, multidirectional scrolling game follows the adventures of fictional character Duke Nukem across three episodes of ten levels each. The game's first episode was distributed as shareware. The name was briefly changed to Duke Nukum to avoid trademark issues.

Duke Nukem was followed by the similarly-styled Duke Nukem II, in 1993. The series made the jump to 3D graphics with Duke Nukem 3D in 1996, which became the most popular of the three games.

== Gameplay ==
Gameplay screenshot

The main objective of the game is to get to the exit of each level, while destroying enemies and collecting points. Many objects onscreen can be shot including boxes, obstacles and blocks. Besides points, some collectibles include health power-ups, gun power-ups, and some inventory items with special abilities. The final level of each episode has no exit, and is instead completed by finding and defeating Dr. Proton.

At the end of every level (with the exception of the last level in each episode), the player can receive up to seven 10,000 point bonuses, earned by making certain achievements in the level, such as destroying all cameras.

== Plot ==
The game is set in the year 1997. The antagonist, Dr. Proton, is a mad scientist determined to take over the world with his army of "Techbots". Duke Nukem, the eponymous hero, is the only one who can take on the task of stopping him. The first episode takes place in the devastated city of Los Angeles following a Techbot invasion. In the second episode, Duke chases Dr. Proton to his secret moonbase. In the third episode, Dr. Proton uses a time machine to escape into the future, and Duke pursues him through time to put an end to his mad schemes.

== Development and release ==
According to programmer and co-creator Todd Replogle, John Carmack helped him program some low-level parts of the game code in assembly language. The game world scrolls by shifting 8x8 "blocks" rather than individual pixels. The game's original title was Heavy Metal, but producer Scott Miller hated the name and chose to name it after the lead character, similar to comic books. He proposed Duke, which he felt sounded strong, and Replogle proposed Nukem as his last name.

After the game's release, Apogee Software became aware that the Captain Planet and the Planeteers animated series featured a character with the same name (Duke Nukem) and therefore to avoid a lawsuit, the software house renamed the 2.0 version of its game Duke Nukum. It later turned out that Duke Nukem was not a registered name, so Apogee registered it and used the original Duke Nukem name in the sequels. Apogee also received a legal letter from Duke University alleging trademark violation. Apogee successfully fought back, and agreed to use the full Duke Nukem name in all their marketing materials.

Duke Nukem Collection 1, which includes remastered versions of Duke Nukem and Duke Nukem II alongside a port of Duke Nukem: Total Meltdown, was released for the Evercade retro gaming console in November 2023.

== Reception ==
Scott Miller estimates that the game eventually sold between 60,000 and 70,000 copies. In 1995, Flux magazine ranked the game 39th on their Top 100 Video Games writing: "Without a doubt, the best platform game for the pc ever created."
