= Duke Nukem =

Video game franchise

- Logo used since Duke Nukem 3D
- Developer: Apogee Software/3D Realms
- Publishers: Apogee Software (1991–1993); FormGen (1996); 2K Games (2011)
- Platforms: MS-DOS, Microsoft Windows, Mac OS, Game Boy Color, Game Boy Advance, Sega Saturn, Nintendo 64, PlayStation Vita, PlayStation 4, Game.com, PlayStation, Sega Genesis, Xbox Live Arcade, iOS, PlayStation 3, Android, Linux, Xbox 360, Nintendo DS, Nintendo Switch, Evercade
- First release: Duke Nukem; July 1, 1991
- Latest release: Duke Nukem 3D: 20th Anniversary World Tour; October 11, 2016

Duke Nukem is a video game series and media franchise created by the company Apogee Software Ltd. (now 3D Realms). The franchise follows the titular Duke Nukem as he battles against a military or an extraterrestrial force. Originally a series of video games for personal computers, the series later expanded to have games released for various consoles by third-party developers. The first two games in the main series were 2D platformers, while later games have been a mix of first-person and third-person shooters.

In 2010, the rights of the series were acquired by Gearbox Software, who completed the development of Duke Nukem Forever and released it on 10 June 2011 in Europe and Australia and on 14 June 2011 in North America. The franchise generated over $1 billion in revenue by 2001. (Note: Other sources say $120 million)

== Games ==
=== Main series ===
Release timeline Main series in bold
1991	**Duke Nukem**
1992
1993	**Duke Nukem II**
1994
1995
1996	**Duke Nukem 3D**
1997
1998	Duke Nukem: Time to Kill
1999	Duke Nukem: Zero Hour
2000	Duke Nukem: Land of the Babes
2001
2002	Duke Nukem: Manhattan Project
2002	Duke Nukem Advance
2003
2004	Duke Nukem Mobile
2005	Duke Nukem Mobile II: Bikini Project
2006
2007	Duke Nukem Arena
2008
2009
2010
2011	Duke Nukem: Critical Mass
2011	**Duke Nukem Forever**

The first three games in the series were developed by Apogee Software, which in 1996 rebranded as 3D Realms. The original game, Duke Nukem, was released in 1991. It is a two-dimensional platform game for the IBM PC and features 320×200, 16-color EGA graphics with vertical and horizontal scrolling. The original game has three episodes, the first distributed as shareware. When Apogee learned that the name "Duke Nukem" might have already been trademarked for the Duke Nukem character from the television series Captain Planet and the Planeteers, they changed it to Duke Nukum for the 2.0 revision. The name was later determined not to be trademarked, so the spelling Duke Nukem was restored for Duke Nukem II and all successive Duke games. The sequel, Duke Nukem II, is more than four times larger and took advantage of 256-color Video Graphics Array (VGA) graphics, Musical Instrument Digital Interface (MIDI) music, and digitized sound. While the game uses three different 16-color palettes, only 16 colors are actually used onscreen at once.

The third game of the series is the first-person shooter (FPS) Duke Nukem 3D, released in 1996. Like most FPS games of the day, Duke Nukem 3D features three-dimensional environments with two-dimensional sprites standing in for weapons, enemies, and breakable background objects. Duke Nukem 3D was released for MS-DOS, Mac OS, PlayStation, Sega Saturn, game.com, Sega Genesis/Mega Drive, Nintendo 64, and later re-released during 2008 for Xbox Live Arcade, and for iOS and Nokia N900 during 2009. Duke Nukem 3D has more than a dozen expansion packs.

The most recent installment in the main video game series, Duke Nukem Forever, was delayed for more than a decade after the initial announcement during April 1997, leading to its being named as a piece of vaporware. Initial development had begun at 3D Realms, but in 2009, 3D Realms was forced to lay off a number of its staff, and development of Duke Nukem Forever stalled. Take-Two Interactive, which was to publish the game, sued 3D Realms for failing to deliver, which was settled in 2010. Gearbox Software had close contact with many of the laid off 3D Realms staff and quietly hired them to continue its development as Triptych Games. 3D Realms sold the rights to Duke Nukem to Gearbox in 2010. The game was officially released on June 10, 2011.

Duke Nukem Collection 1, which includes remastered versions of Duke Nukem and Duke Nukem II alongside a port of Duke Nukem: Total Meltdown, was released for the Evercade retrogaming console in November 2023.

=== Cancelled games ===
One of the first projects to be announced after the success of Duke Nukem 3D was a return to Duke Nukem's 2D side-scrolling, platforming format for a game named Duke Nukem 4Ever. The project was directed by Keith Schuler, main designer and programmer for the games Paganitzu and Realms of Chaos, and a level designer for the Plutonium PAK.

The 2D 4Ever was planned to combine a number of the new concepts of Duke Nukem 3D with the old-style play of the first two games of the series. Duke's look, personality, and armory from the recent shooter would be matched with run and gun platforming, with a few new objects, including a cloaking device and five-piece weapon named the "heavy barrel", added in. Players would face off against Dr. Proton's minions, the Protonite cyborgs, along with other level-specific grunt enemies. Each episode would end with a boss fight, with the last one fought against Proton himself. Development on Duke Nukem 4Ever stalled during the middle of 1996 when Keith Schuler was reassigned to work on maps for the Duke Nukem 3D expansion pack. The game's cancellation wasn't publicly announced until 1997, at a time when 3D Realms had decided to reuse the name for their sequel to Duke Nukem 3D. An early version of the game was leaked in December 2022.

Duke Nukem: Endangered Species was announced in January 2001. It was designed to be a hunting game where the player could hunt everything from dinosaurs to snakes, using an improved version of the engine used in the Carnivores series. The game was cancelled in December of that year. The company that had been developing the game, Ukraine-based developer Action Forms, later developed its own game, Vivisector: Beast Within (originally titled Vivisector: Creatures of Doctor Moreau), instead. In 2023, a development build and design documents were leaked online.

When Duke Nukem Trilogy was announced during 2008, it was intended for release on the Nintendo DS and PlayStation Portable (PSP). Each game in the series was to have two versions that shared the same story – the Nintendo DS game was a side-scrolling affair, while the PSP version was to be a third-person shooter not unlike Duke Nukem: Time to Kill. The PSP version was said to be the more adult-oriented of the two games.

A remake of Duke Nukem 3D called Duke Nukem 3D: Reloaded, was in development by Interceptor Entertainment, however Gearbox Software would only grant Interceptor a private licence; unable to obtain a commercial licence Interceptor abandoned the project.

Interceptor was working on a top-down action role-playing game called Duke Nukem: Mass Destruction for the PlayStation 4 and PC; however, due to a lawsuit by Gearbox, the main character was changed and the game was renamed Bombshell.

Duke Nukem Begins was a cancelled game in development at Gearbox from 2007 to 2009; reporting first came in late 2011 that Gearbox Software planned to reboot the Duke Nukem franchise once Aliens: Colonial Marines was complete and out the door. The existence of the game was revealed during lawsuits between 3D Realms and Take-Two Interactive, the title was intended to be an origin story, illustrating how Duke became the person he is in chronologically later games. Development on the title began within two months of the October 2007 agreement, with the intention of a mid-2010 release. However, development was cancelled in 2009, around the same time that 3D Realms had asserted ownership of the Duke Nukem intellectual property over Gearbox. Legal wrangling between developer 3D Realms and publisher Take-Two Interactive over the non-delivery of Duke Nukem Forever after 3D Realms dismissed all development staff during 2009, revealed that the two companies had agreed on the production of a console-targeted Duke game during October 2007. 3D Realms accepted the deal in exchange for a $2.5 million advance on royalties in order to continue to fund development of Duke Nukem Forever. Gearbox Software was later revealed to be the developer of the game. However, no further details emerged and the game was quietly cancelled. Pre-release footage from the game was revealed in 2021 from one of the animators on the project.

=== Future of the series ===
In 2015, Gearbox CEO Randy Pitchford stated the company had done early concept work on a new Duke Nukem game. In 2017, a Gearbox representative said that there were no plans for another Duke Nukem title.

In late 2023, Zen Studios announced a new digital pinball adaptation of Duke Nukem, titled Duke Nukem's Big Shot Pinball, as the first non-horror table for its adult pinball video game Pinball M.

== Other media ==
=== Soundtrack ===
Several Duke Nukem games contained popular tracks from well known bands, and a greatest hits album titled Duke Nukem: Music to Score By was released in 1999.

=== Feature film ===
During the late 1990s, it was announced that film producer Lawrence Kasanoff was working on a Duke Nukem movie. The plot was to feature aliens invading Duke's favorite strip club. Kasanoff's Duke Nukem film did not advance past the pre-production phase for multiple reasons, primarily funding problems.

Plans were announced during 2001 for a live action Duke Nukem movie to be produced by Kasanoff's company Threshold Entertainment, however the movie was never produced.

During 2008, Max Payne producer Scott Faye revealed to IGN.com that he was planning to produce Duke Nukem as a movie. Faye, who runs production company Depth Entertainment, said he hoped to complement these with "a Duke movie scenario that will compel a studio to finance a feature version ... Certainly, there's a large audience that knows and loves this character. We're expanding Duke's 'storyverse' in a very significant major way without abandoning or negating any element that's being used to introduce Duke to the next-gen platforms."

During an interview with Game Slice in 2017, Gearbox Software CEO Randy Pitchford hinted that there is work being done on a Duke Nukem film.

In March 2018, it was announced that John Cena would star in a Duke Nukem movie for Paramount Pictures & Platinum Dunes. However, in January 2019 Duke Nukem voice actor Jon St. John stated that no movie was in development. In a press statement announcing Embracer Group's acquisition of Gearbox Software, however, production of the film was reconfirmed.

Legendary Entertainment announced in June 2022 they had acquired the rights to make a Duke Nukem film from Gearbox. The film is helmed by the team behind Cobra Kai, Josh Heald, Jon Hurwitz and Hayden Schlossberg for Counterbalance Entertainment and Jean Julien Baronnet from Marla Studio.

=== Animated series ===
On June 18, 2025, Adi Shankar announced a “faithful” animated series adaptation that "fans will like."

=== Comic series ===
A four issue mini-series titled Duke Nukem: Glorious Bastard was released during July 2011 by IDW. The story features Duke Nukem traveling back in time to the Second World War, to help the Allies defeat the Nazis and aliens. A special pack-in comic was also created for the Balls of Steel edition of Duke Nukem Forever. The Glorious Bastard series and the pack-in comic were eventually reprinted together in trade paperback format.

=== Merchandise ===
Beginning in 1997, now-defunct toy company ReSaurus began releasing action figures based on the Duke Nukem franchise. Primarily emphasizing Duke Nukem 3D, the line features three versions of Duke, with a fourth "Internet only" Duke available with a CD-ROM and freeze-thrower accessory. The line also includes a Pigcop, Octabrain, and Battlelord. The toys were found to be prone to breakage, particularly Duke's legs, which are held on by a thin plastic rod which easily snaps, and the Octabrain, which has a number of fragile points. More toys were planned to coincide with the release of Duke Nukem Forever. However, the game's delay halted production of the toys and ReSaurus eventually went out of business. At Toyfair 2011, NECA revealed a new series of Duke Nukem Forever action figures with more details and articulation than the previous series.

During 2012, Sideshow Collectibles announced a new collectible statue based on Duke Nukem as he appeared in Duke Nukem Forever. The statue was released during April 2013.

== Reception ==
Aggregate review scores
Game	Metacritic
Duke Nukem II	(GBC) 73% (Note: GameRankings score) (iOS) 50/100
Duke Nukem 3D	(PC) 89/100 (SAT) 82% (X360) 80/100 (PS4) 77/100 (N64) 73/100 (XONE) 70/100 (PS3) 70/100 (Vita) 69/100 (iOS) 63% (PS1) 59%
Duke Nukem: Time to Kill	(PS1) 75%
Duke Nukem: Zero Hour	(N64) 67%
Duke Nukem: Land of the Babes	(PS1) 37/100
Duke Nukem: Manhattan Project	(PC) 78/100 (iOS) 55/100 (X360) 41/100
Duke Nukem Advance	(GBA) 81/100
Duke Nukem: Critical Mass	(NDS) 29/100
Duke Nukem Forever	(PC) 54/100 (PS3) 51/100 (X360) 49/100

The series has been generally popular since its inception. Duke Nukem and Duke Nukem II, along with Commander Keen, helped make the side-scrolling platformer genre popular on the personal computer, as games like Super Mario Bros. had for video game consoles.

The games progressed from the shareware niche and into the mainstream gamer audience with Duke Nukem 3D, which was also part of video game controversy. The game, like others such as Star Wars: Dark Forces, was one of the first titles considered comparable to Doom. The Build engine program used for Duke Nukem 3D has also become one of the most popular programs used by developers. Duke Nukem 3D was controversial because of its depictions of human sexuality, pornography, obscenities, graphic violence, recreational drug use, and other risqué topics. This caused the game to be banned in Brazil and, in other countries, the sale of the game was strictly regulated against purchase by minors. Despite this, Duke Nukem 3D was a commercial and critical success for 3D Realms.

The development of Duke Nukem Forever was delayed from 1997 until it was finally released on June 10, 2011. The exceedingly long wait had caused a number of jokes related to its development timeline. The video game media and the public in general have routinely suggested several names instead of Forever, calling it: "Never", "(Taking) Forever", "Whenever", "ForNever", "Neverever", and "If Ever". Fans speculated that the game's initials, "DNF", also stand for Did Not Finish, a common sporting term. Due to Duke Nukem games featuring multiple popular culture references, a joke on the "development hell" of Duke Nukem Forever's production was included in the title itself, where Duke is playing it himself within the game, and when asked if it was any good, comments, "After 12 fucking years, it should be!" The game has also won a wide variety of "vaporware awards".

Although anticipation was great, Duke Nukem Forever received negative reviews upon release from critics, with most of the criticism directed towards the game's clunky controls on consoles, shooting mechanics, and overall aging and dated design. The PR company responsible for the game's publicity, The Redner Group, reacted to these reviews in a statement on the corporation's Twitter account. This comment appeared to threaten to withdraw access to review copies for future titles for reviewers who had been critical of the game. Manager of the PR company Jim Redner later apologized for and retracted this comment, and the original Twitter post has been deleted. Despite the apologies, Publisher 2K Games has officially stopped The Redner Group from representing its products.

Duke Nukem: Manhattan Project, a spin-off from the main franchise released during 2002, generally received positive reviews in the video game press, with rankings around 7/10 and 80 out of 100. The game, however, did not sell as well as hoped, and its developer Sunstorm Interactive is no longer in existence. Duke Nukem Advance, which was also released during 2002 for the Game Boy Advance, did receive favorable reviews. Duke Nukem: Critical Mass, which was released the same year as Duke Nukem Forever and was developed for the Nintendo DS, received a negative reception.
