= Duke Nukem: Land of the Babes =

2000 video game

- North American box art
- Developer: n-Space
- Publishers: NA: Infogrames (Note: Even though the packaging says GT Interactive, the Infogrames logo appears in-game); EU: Take-Two Interactive
- Series: Duke Nukem
- Platform: PlayStation
- Release: NA: October 16, 2000; PAL: April 6, 2001
- Genre: Third-person shooter
- Modes: Single player, multiplayer

Duke Nukem: Land of the Babes is a 2000 third-person shooter video game developed by n-Space and published by Infogrames for the PlayStation. A spin-off of 3D Realms' Duke Nukem series, it received mostly negative reviews.

== Gameplay ==
Similar to Duke Nukem: Time to Kill, Land of the Babes is a third-person shooter game with very similar graphics. All enemies are new, except the pigcops and necro which were only slightly changed (the pigcops having a strong build instead of obese and the necro being a lot smaller and only appear in underwater levels). This time Duke's Desert Eagle handgun is customized with gold, and weapons such as the combat shotgun, the mighty boot (which is to throw kicks) and the throwing knife can be used without having to find them, the knife can be thrown as many times as desired for its ammo is unlimited. Weapons from the previous games are used such as the freezer (slightly improved), flamethrower, RPG, pipe bombs, dynamite, Gatling gun (this time being laser Gatling) and energy weapon, plus new weapons like the sniper rifle, grenade launcher, shrinker and other alien like weapons. In plenty of levels the player must get through obstacles which consist in climbing, jumping, swimming, running and other athletic type of movements to get through. Of course just like the previous games most levels depend in finding objects to beat the level such as keys, explosives etc. The difficulty of the game is easier than the previous one, mostly because each time an enemy is killed, the player's ego increases, and there are other objects which also increase ego like the Duke Nukem action figure and Duke's bio which is portable and can be used at any moment to increase ego.

== Plot ==
Duke is relaxing at a strip club when suddenly a portal opens and a woman appears to give Duke his (old) sunglasses, but pigcops follow her and kill her. After killing the pigcops Duke heads through the portal which leads him to an underground bunker in the future. There, a woman named Jane explains to him that the aliens have exterminated all men on Earth and the women are captured to be used as slaves and that Silverback (a pigcop, ape hybrid) is leading the assault on UBR (unified babe resistance).

The first levels consist of escaping the underground bunker and shooting down Silverback's ship with the purpose of rescuing a UBR scientist named Houston who was taken to the ship, but the ship crashes in the sunken city ruins. In the following levels Jane sets up Duke with scuba gear to go in after the ship and saving Houston but he only finds one of the captured women without Houston. After the underwater levels Duke finds a hidden entrance into Silverback's base which is in a sewer, and eventually fights Silverback, who uses an armored robotic suit.

After killing Silverback, Duke goes through a portal which leads him to an alien mine and eventually into a factory where the aliens are creating killer robots which are identical to the UBR women. At one point Duke reaches a junkyard where he destroys the main computer that handles the robots and afterwards steals a spacesuit and ship which he uses to get to an alien space station. It is here where Duke finally rescues Houston who tells him that due to his success against the alien captain Silverback, they are planning to use the space station to blow up the Earth. After rescuing all the women imprisoned in the space station Duke reaches "the gauntlet" where the alien leader challenges him to conquer all its levels in order to fight him, in the gauntlet Duke fights all enemy types he has faced throughout the game (except the aquatic ones), then finally he fights the alien boss which is like a larger version of the green cyclops soldiers with a hovercraft. In the ending sequence the UBR is running the "operation repopulation" which involves Duke (being the only living male) singlehandedly repopulating the planet.

== Development ==
The game was originally set to release in May 2000 under the title "Duke Nukem: Planet of the Babes".

The game was re-released on the Evercade/VS platform as part of the Duke Nukem Collection 2 in November 2023.

== Reception ==
Reception

Aggregate score
Aggregator	Score
Metacritic	37/100

Review scores
Publication	Score
AllGame	1.5/5
GameSpot	6.2/10
IGN	4/10
Official U.S. PlayStation Magazine	2.5/5

Duke Nukem: Land of the Babes received "generally unfavourable" reviews, according to review aggregator Metacritic.
