= Duke Nukem 3D =

1996 first-person shooter video game

- Developers: 3D Realms: Lion Entertainment (Mac OS); General Arcade (Megaton Edition); Gearbox Software, Nerve Software (20th Anniversary World Tour)
- Publishers: FormGen: MacSoft (Mac OS); U.S. Gold (MS-DOS, Europe); Eidos Interactive (Atomic Edition, Kill-A-Ton Collection) (Europe); GT Interactive (PS/N64); King Records (PS, Japan); Sega (Note: Released under the Deep Water brand name in North America) (SS); TecToy (SG, original); Piko Interactive (SG, reissue); Microsoft Game Studios (X360); MachineWorks Northwest (iOS, Android); Devolver Digital (Megaton Edition); Gearbox Publishing (20th Anniversary World Tour, Atomic Edition, digital reissue); Jordan Freeman Group (Atomic Edition, digital reissue); 2K Games (Atomic Edition, digital reissue)
- Producer: Greg Malone
- Designers: Allen H. Blum III; Richard Gray
- Programmer: Todd Replogle
- Composers: Lee Jackson; Robert Prince
- Series: Duke Nukem
- Engine: Build
- Platforms: MS-DOS: Android; Game.com; iOS; Classic Mac OS; Windows; Nintendo 64; macOS; PlayStation; PlayStation 3; PlayStation Vita; Mega Drive/Genesis; Sega Saturn; Xbox 360; PlayStation 4; Xbox One; Nintendo Switch
- Release: January 29, 1996: MS-DOS; NA: January 29, 1996 (Shareware Version); NA: April 19, 1996 (Full Version); NA: December 11, 1996 (Atomic Edition); EU: May 17, 1996 Game.com; NA: 1997 Mac OS; NA: June 6, 1997 Saturn; NA: October 29, 1997; EU: October 30, 1997 Nintendo 64; WW: November 14, 1997 PlayStation; NA: December 2, 1997; EU: December 1997 Mega Drive/Genesis; BR: 1998; WW: October 16, 2015 Xbox 360; WW: September 24, 2008 iOS; WW: August 11, 2009 Android; WW: November 1, 2011 Megaton Edition; Windows, OS X; WW: March 20, 2013 Linux; WW: September 4, 2013 PlayStation 3, PlayStation Vita; NA: January 6, 2015; EU: January 7, 2015 20th Anniversary World Tour; Windows, PlayStation 4, Xbox One; WW: October 11, 2016; Switch; WW: June 23, 2020
- Genre: First-person shooter
- Modes: Single-player, multiplayer

Duke Nukem 3D is a 1996 first-person shooter game developed by 3D Realms and published by FormGen for MS-DOS. It is a sequel to the platform games Duke Nukem and Duke Nukem II, published by 3D Realms.

Duke Nukem 3D features the adventures of the titular Duke Nukem, voiced by Jon St. John, who fights against an alien invasion on Earth. Along with Wolfenstein 3D, Doom and Quake, Duke Nukem 3D is considered to be responsible for popularizing first-person shooters, and was released to major critical acclaim. Reviewers praised the interactivity of the environments, gameplay, level design, and unique risqué humor, a mix of pop-culture satire and lampooning of over-the-top Hollywood action heroes. However, it also incited controversy due to its violence, erotic elements, and portrayal of women. Since its release, Duke Nukem 3D has been cited as one of the greatest video games ever made.

The shareware version was originally released on January 29, 1996, while the full version of the game was released on April 19, 1996. The Plutonium PAK, an expansion pack which updated the game to version 1.4 and added a fourth eleven-level episode, was released on October 21, 1996. The Atomic Edition, a standalone version of the game that included the content from the Plutonium PAK and updated the game to version 1.5, was released on December 11, 1996. A fifth episode was released on October 11, 2016, with 20th Anniversary World Tour published by Gearbox Software. A sequel, Duke Nukem Forever, was released in 2011.

== Gameplay ==
Duke Nukem 3D gameplay at the beginning of the first level ("Hollywood Holocaust")

As a first-person shooter whose gameplay is similar to Doom, the gameplay of Duke Nukem 3D involves moving through levels presented from the protagonist's point of view, shooting enemies on the way. The environments in Duke Nukem 3D are highly destructible and interactive; most props can be destroyed by the player.

Levels were designed in a fairly non-linear manner such that players can advantageously use air ducts, back doors, and sewers to avoid enemies or find hidden caches. These locations are also filled with objects the player can interact with. Some confer gameplay benefits to the player; light switches make it easier to see, while water fountains and broken fire hydrants provide some health points. Others are simply there as a diversion. Tipping strippers provokes a quote from Duke, and a provocative reveal from the dancer.

Duke's arsenal consists of the "Mighty Foot" (a basic kick attack), a pistol, a shotgun, a triple-barrelled chain gun, a rocket-propelled grenade launcher, pipe bombs, freezethrower and shrink rays, laser land mines, and the rapid-fire "Devastator" rocket launcher. The Atomic Edition version of the game also has an "Expander", the opposite of the shrink-ray weapon. Lastly, the 20th Anniversary World Tour version of the game also has an "Incinerator", the opposite of the freezethrower (with fiery projectiles instead of ice).

Various items can be picked up during gameplay. The portable medkit allows players to heal Duke at will. Steroids speed up Duke's movement, as well as instantly reversing the effects of the shrink-ray weapon and increasing the strength of Duke's Mighty Foot for a short period. Night vision goggles allow players to see enemies in the dark. The "HoloDuke" device projects a hologram of Duke, which can be used to distract enemies. Protective boots allow Duke to cross dangerously hot or toxic terrain. In sections where progress requires more aquatic legwork, an aqua-lung allows Duke to take longer trips underwater. Duke's jet pack allows the player to move vertically and gain access to otherwise inaccessible areas.

The game features a wide variety of enemies; some of which are aliens and other mutated humans. The LAPD have been turned into "Pig Cops", a play on the derogatory term "pig" for police officers, with LARD emblazoned on their uniforms. As is usual for a first-person shooter, Duke Nukem encounters a large number of lesser foes, as well as bosses, usually at the end of episodes. Like Duke, these enemies have access to a wide range of weapons and equipment, and some weaker enemies have jet packs.

== Plot ==
=== Setting ===
Duke Nukem 3D is set on Earth "sometime in the early 21st century". The levels of Duke Nukem 3D take players outdoors and indoors through rendered street scenes, military bases, deserts, a flooded city, space stations, Moon bases, and a Japanese restaurant.

The game contains several humorous references to pop culture. Some of Duke's lines are drawn from movies such as Aliens, Dirty Harry, Evil Dead II, Full Metal Jacket, Jaws, Pulp Fiction, and They Live; the captured women saying "Kill me" is a reference to Aliens. Players will encounter corpses of famous characters such as Luke Skywalker, Indiana Jones, Snake Plissken, the protagonist of Doom, and a smashed T-800. In the first episode, players navigate a tunnel in the wall of a prison cell hidden behind a poster, just like in The Shawshank Redemption. During the second episode, players can see a Monolith (from 2001: A Space Odyssey) on the Moon and use it as a teleport to complete the level.

=== Story ===
There is little narrative in the game, only a brief text prelude located under "Help" in the Main Menu, and a few cutscenes after the completion of an episode. The game picks up right after the events of Duke Nukem II, with Duke returning to Earth in his space cruiser. As Duke descends on Los Angeles in hopes of taking a vacation, his ship is shot down by unknown hostiles. While sending a distress signal, Duke learns that aliens are attacking Los Angeles and have mutated the LAPD. With his vacation plans now ruined, Duke hits the "eject" button, and vows to do whatever it takes to stop the alien invasion.

In "Episode One: L.A. Meltdown", Duke fights his way through a dystopian Los Angeles. At a strip club, he is captured by pig-cops, but escapes the alien-controlled penitentiary and tracks down the alien cruiser responsible for the invasion in the San Andreas Fault. Duke confronts and kills an Alien Battlelord in the final level. Duke discovers that the aliens were capturing women, and detonates the ship. Levels in this episode include a movie theater, a red-light district, a prison, and a nuclear-waste disposal facility.

In "Episode Two: Lunar Apocalypse", Duke journeys to space, where he finds many of the captured women held in various incubators throughout space stations that had been conquered by the aliens. Duke reaches the alien mother ship on the Moon and kills an alien Overlord. As Duke inspects the ship's computer, it is revealed that the plot to capture women was merely a ruse to distract him. The aliens have already begun their attack on Earth.

In "Episode Three: Shrapnel City", Duke battles the massive alien presence through Los Angeles once again, and kills the leader of the alien menace: the Cycloid Emperor. The game ends as Duke promises that after some "R&R", he will be "...ready for more action!", as an anonymous woman calls him back to bed. Levels in this episode include a sushi bar, a movie set, a subway, and a hotel.

The story continues in the Atomic Edition. In "Episode Four: The Birth", it is revealed that the aliens used a captured woman to give birth to the Alien Queen, a creature which can quickly spawn deadly alien protector drones. Duke is dispatched back to Los Angeles to fight hordes of aliens, including the protector drones. Eventually, Duke finds the lair of the Alien Queen, and kills her, thus thwarting the alien plot. Levels in this episode include a fast-food restaurant ("Duke Burger"), a supermarket, a Disneyland parody called "Babe Land", a police station, the oil tanker Exxon Valdez, and Area 51.

With the release of 20th Anniversary World Tour, the story progresses further. In "Episode Five: Alien World Order", Duke finds out that the aliens initiated a world-scale invasion, so he sets out to repel their attack on various countries. Duke proceeds to clear out aliens from Amsterdam, Moscow, London, San Francisco, Paris, the Giza pyramid complex, and Rome, with the final showdown with the returning alien threat taking place in Los Angeles, taking the game full circle. There, he defeats the Cycloid Incinerator, the current alien leader, stopping their threat for good.

== Development ==
Duke Nukem 3D was developed on a budget of roughly $300,000. The development team consisted of 8 people for most of the development cycle, increasing to 12 or 13 people near the end. At one point, the game was being programmed to allow the player to switch between first-person view, third-person view, and fixed camera angles. Scott Miller of 3D Realms recalled that "with Duke 3D, unlike every shooter that came before, we wanted to have sort of real life locations like a cinema theatre, you know, strip club, bookstores..." The game's development started in 1994.

LameDuke is an early prototype of Duke Nukem 3D, which was released by 3D Realms as a "bonus" one year after the release of the official version. It has been released as is, with no support. LameDuke features four episodes: Mr. Caliber, Mission Cockroach, Suck Hole, and Hard Landing. Certain weapons were altered from the original versions and/or removed.

The original official website was created by Jeffrey D. Erb and Mark Farish of Intersphere Communications Ltd.

== Release ==
=== PC versions ===
- Shareware Version: The shareware version, released on January 29, 1996, as version 1.0, contained only the first episode. This version uses 3D Realms's shareware distribution model, which means that it can be distributed for free. The shareware version was re-released as version 1.1 on February 20, 1996, and re-released once again as version 1.3D on April 24, 1996.
- Full Version: Released on April 19, 1996, as version 1.3D. 3D Realms started shipping the full registered version to customers on May 5, 1996. The company streamed the process of packing and shipping the first copies using a webcam. The full version contains the original three episodes, and includes the full versions of Duke Nukem and Duke Nukem II as bonus content.
- Plutonium PAK/Atomic Edition: The Atomic Edition of Duke Nukem 3D was released in November 1996 as a standalone game. It contained the original three episodes, as well as a new eleven-level fourth episode, bringing the level total to 41 as opposed to 30 in the original Duke Nukem 3D. The Plutonium PAK was released as an upgrade package to convert the original release of Duke Nukem 3D (v1.3d) to the Atomic Edition (v1.4, updated to v1.5 with the standalone Atomic Edition release and via a free download patch for the Plutonium PAK version on 3D Realms' website). It introduced two new enemies, the Protector Drone and the Pig Cop Tank, a new final boss, the Alien Queen, and a new weapon, the Expander. Changes to the script made the game easier to mod, and players could set up a multiplayer session against CPU bots. This is the only official add-on for the game developed by 3D Realms. Unlike the original release of Duke Nukem 3D, however, the Atomic Edition does not include Duke Nukem and Duke Nukem II.
- Macintosh Version: The Macintosh release was ported by Lion Entertainment Inc. and released on June 6, 1997, in Minneapolis, being shipped by MacSoft.
- East Meets West: Released in 1998, includes Duke Nukem 3D: Atomic Edition and the full version of Shadow Warrior.
- Duke: The Apocalypse contains Duke!ZONE II, Duke Xtreme, and a T-shirt.
- Duke: The Apocalypse 2 contains Duke!ZONE, Duke It Out In D.C., a strategy guide, and a T-shirt.
- Kill-A-Ton Collection: The Kill-A-Ton Collection was released in 1998 and includes: Duke Nukem I (Duke Nukum), Duke Nukem II, Duke Nukem 3D (both v1.3d and v1.5), Duke It Out In D.C., Duke!ZONE II, Duke Xtreme, and various editing utilities.
- GOG release: The Atomic Edition was released on GOG.com along with Duke Nukem 1, 2 and Manhattan Project in 2009. The entire catalog was removed from the website on December 31, 2015, due to a licensing agreement with Gearbox Software.
- Duke Nukem 3D: Megaton Edition. Note the higher-resolution HUD and OpenGL graphics.
  Megaton Edition: Developed by General Arcade and published by Devolver Digital, it was released through Steam on March 20, 2013. The Megaton Edition includes Duke Nukem 3D: Atomic Edition, Duke It Out In D.C., Duke Caribbean: Life's a Beach, and Duke: Nuclear Winter all running on OpenGL, as well as the original MS-DOS version of Duke Nukem 3D: Atomic Edition. It supports SteamPlay for Windows, Mac OS X, and Linux, and is based on the code of the JFDuke3D source port by Jonathon Fowler. Online multiplayer was added to the game in January 2014. However, about a year later, the Megaton Edition was removed from all digital distribution as Devolver Digital's agreement with Gearbox Software has ended now that the latter company currently owns the intellectual property. In 2016, Gearbox informed TechRaptor that they have plans to "bring the game back this year," and that game became the 20th Anniversary World Tour.
- Kill-a-Ton 2015 Collection: Released in May 2015 on Steam, includes everything that Kill-a-Ton Collection contained (with exception of Duke Nukem 3D v1.3D and Duke Xtreme), plus two other expansions, Duke Caribbean: Life's a Beach, and Duke: Nuclear Winter, as well as Duke Nukem: Manhattan Project and the Balls of Steel game. Like with the GOG.com release and Megaton Edition, it was removed from Steam at the end of 2015.
- 20th Anniversary World Tour: Developed by Nerve Software and Gearbox Software and published by Gearbox Publishing. It was announced by Gearbox Software on September 2, 2016, at PAX East, and it's a re-release for the Xbox One, PlayStation 4, and PC via Steam. World Tour includes an all-new 5th episode by the original episode designers, new music by composer Lee Jackson, re-recorded voice lines by Jon St. John, new enemies and new lighting effects. However, it does not contain the expansions from Kill-A-Ton Collection and Megaton Edition. World Tour was released on October 11, 2016.
- ZOOM Platform release: The Atomic Edition was released on ZOOM Platform along with Duke Nukem 1, 2 and Manhattan Project in 2014. As of 2020, it includes Duke It Out In D.C., Duke Caribbean: Life's a Beach, Duke: Nuclear Winter, Duke Nukem's Penthouse Paradise, Duke!ZONE and Duke!ZONE II. Since 2022, it also includes Duke - It's Zero Hour. As of 2024, ZOOM Platform is the only digital store where the Atomic Edition is available.

=== Expansion packs ===
- Nuke It: This is an expansion pack developed by Micro Star in 1996, consisting of 300 custom made levels. Although it was made with the Build Editor, Micro Star was countersued by FormGen and 3D Realms for copyright infringement for unauthorized sales of the pack. Ultimately Micro Star lost their case.
- Duke It Out In D.C.: This is an authorized add-on developed by Sunstorm Interactive and published by WizardWorks; it was released in March 1997. President Bill Clinton is captured by alien forces, and Duke must save him. This expansion pack featured 10 new levels that were based on real-world locations, such as: the White House, the FBI headquarters, the Smithsonian museum, the Washington Monument, and other areas in Washington, D.C. The add-on was also included as part of an official compilation called Duke Nukem: Kill-A-Ton Collection through business deals with 3D Realms. Charlie Wiederhold created levels for this add-on.
- Duke Caribbean: Life's a Beach: This is an authorized add-on developed by Sunstorm Interactive and published by WizardWorks; it was released in January 1998. Duke is relaxing on a tropical island when he discovers that the aliens are having their own "vacation". This add-on includes a sunny Caribbean theme with 12 new levels that take place on beaches and vacation hotels. The add-on also reskins Duke's weapons with a summer theme, such as water guns. Charlie Wiederhold created several levels for this add-on. Wiederhold was later hired by 3D Realms to work on the sequel Duke Nukem Forever.
- Duke: Nuclear Winter: This is an authorized add-on developed by Simply Silly Software and published by WizardWorks; it was released in January 1998. Santa Claus is being mind-controlled by aliens into causing trouble on Earth. Several of the levels take place in Alaska and the North Pole.
- Duke!ZONE: An authorized add-on released in 1996, published by WizardWorks, which includes 500 fan-made levels and various editing utilities.
- Duke!ZONE II: An authorized follow-up add-on to Duke!ZONE, published by WizardWorks and released in 1997. Duke!ZONE II contains three new episodes, each containing seven levels, created by Simply Silly Software and the same 500 fan-made levels from the original Duke!ZONE.
- Duke Xtreme: An authorized add-on released in 1997 and developed by Sunstorm Interactive, containing 50 levels (25 for single player and 25 for multiplayer) and various editing utilities.
- Duke Assault: An add-on released in 1997 containing over 1,500 levels for Duke Nukem 3D. It was published by WizardWorks and created by fans in the Duke Nukem 3D modding community.
- Duke Nukem's Penthouse Paradise: This is an official add-on for Duke Nukem 3D, created by Jeffrey D. Erb and Mark Farish of Intersphere Communications Ltd. and available exclusively from GT Interactive and Penthouse in May 1997. Taking place between Duke Nukem 3D and the Atomic Edition, aliens interrupt Duke's R&R and a couple of Penthouse photo shoots. Duke has to fight his way through a hotel, clubs, and, finally, the Penthouse offices. The level features music from the industrial rock band Needle.
- Duke - It's Zero Hour: An add-on developed by ZeroHour Software and released in November 1997. It was originally slated to be a retail product via WizardWorks, but the developers ended up releasing it for free. It has 11 new levels that feature 12 all-new monsters, five new weapons, music, and sound effects.

=== Console versions and add-ons ===
Duke Nukem 3D was ported to many consoles of the time. All of the ports featured some sort of new content.

- Duke Nukem 3D (Game.com) was released in 1997 in the USA only. Unlike every other version of the game, Duke Nukem cannot turn; he can only move forward, backward, and strafe to the left or right. Due to the Game.com's monochrome screen, it is also the only version to lack color. It only includes four levels from each of the original three episodes for a total of 12 levels. These levels were modified to accommodate Duke Nukem's inability to turn.
- Duke Nukem 3D (Sega Saturn) was ported by Lobotomy Software and published by Sega in North America on October 29, 1997, and in Europe on October 30, 1997. It retains the original name and uses Lobotomy Software's own fully 3D SlaveDriver engine. This version uses the Sega NetLink for online gaming, and has built-in support for the Saturn's analog pad. It also includes a hidden multiplayer mini-game called Death Tank Zwei, and an exclusive bonus level called Urea 51, accessed through the level "Fahrenheit". It was the final game branded by Sega of America under the Deep Water label, employed for games featuring adult content such as Eternal Champions: Challenge from the Dark Side.
- Duke Nukem: Total Meltdown (titled simply Duke Nukem in Europe), the PlayStation port released on December 2, 1997, was developed by Aardvark Software. It contains all three original episodes, plus an exclusive fourth episode, Plug 'n' Pray, which includes six new levels and a secret level. The secret level was also included in the PC version of Duke Nukem 3D. The new episode features several new enemies, including three new types of Pig Cops, and a new final boss, the CyberKeef. This version also features remixed music, some rearranged from the PC version, and some original, in streaming XA-Audio made by Mark Knight. It includes support for analog pads and the PlayStation Link Cable.

Nintendo 64 port. Note its level design changes and that some sprites were replaced with polygonal models.

- Duke Nukem 64 is a port released on November 14, 1997, for the Nintendo 64 and features a split screen 4-player mode. It was developed by Eurocom. In-game music was removed due to limited storage capacity, many items were renamed to avoid drug and sex references, and new lines of dialogue were recorded specifically for this version to remove profanity. Several levels were altered to include areas from the Atomic Edition, such as a Duke Burger outlet in the second level which was not in the original PC version. Levels are played sequentially instead of as separate episodes. Other changes include the addition of Rumble Pak support, four new weapons, dual sub-machine guns, a grenade launcher, a missile launcher, and the Plasma Cannon, alternative ammo types for the pistol, shotgun, and missile launcher, and a fully 3D model for the Cycloid Emperor boss. The Protector Drone, an enemy from the Atomic Edition, also appears a few times in the standard levels. Originally, the weapons and end bosses were going to be polygonal.

Mega Drive/Genesis port

- Duke Nukem 3D (Mega Drive/Genesis) was released in 1998 by Tec Toy. The visuals were drastically simplified, being closer to early shooters like Wolfenstein 3D. It consisted solely of Lunar Apocalypse, the second from the original game's three episodes, which was heavily modified to suit the game engine. This version was initially released in South America only. In 2015, Piko Interactive acquired the rights to the port from Tec Toy and released it worldwide in cartridge form on October 16, 2015.
- Duke Nukem 3D (Xbox 360) was released on September 24, 2008. This version features: the ability to "rewind" the game to any prior point upon dying, save clips of gameplay, and play cooperatively online, as well as the standard "Dukematch" online multiplayer mode. The music received a slight quality upgrade with modern MIDI tools.
- Duke Nukem 3D (iPhone/iPod Touch) was released on August 11, 2009, and ported by MachineWorks Northwest. The game employs a new engine, which uses a trademarked touch-screen system called TapShoot to allow players to lock onto and dispatch foes. An update in September 2009 made the game compatible with the first and second-generation iPod Touch. It also added a new control scheme which lets players control Duke by dragging their finger around the screen.
- Duke Nukem 3D (Nokia N900) was released on December 29, 2009. As shown in a MaemoWorld's video, Duke is controlled using the Qwerty keypad and touchscreen.
- Duke Nukem 3D: Megaton Edition (PlayStation 3, PlayStation Vita) was released on January 6, 2015, in North America, and January 7, 2015, in Europe. It is a port of the Megaton Edition released on Steam for Windows, Mac, and Linux. It was developed by General Arcade for the PC, ported to consoles by Abstraction Games, and published by Devolver Digital. It features cross-buy and Cross-Play between both platforms. As of February 2016, the game is no longer available for purchase in North America due to publishing rights returning to Gearbox Software. Previously purchased copies can still be downloaded and played.
- Duke Nukem 3D: 20th Anniversary World Tour (PlayStation 4, Xbox One, Nintendo Switch, PC): Released on October 11, 2016. Includes a new 5th episode, made by the original designers and new music by Lee Jackson, the original composer. The Nintendo Switch version released on June 23, 2020.

=== Soundtrack ===
Lee Jackson's theme song "Grabbag" has elicited many covers and remixes over the years by both fans and professional musicians, including an officially sanctioned studio version by thrash metal band Megadeth. Another version of the song was recorded by Chris Kline in August 2005. 3D Realms featured it on the front page of their website and contracted with Kline to use it to promote their Xbox Live release of Duke Nukem 3D.

== Sales ==
Duke Nukem 3D was a commercial hit, selling about 3.5 million copies. In the United States alone, it was the 12th best-selling computer game in the period from 1993 to 1999, with 950,000 units sold. NPD Techworld, a firm that tracked sales in the United States, reported 1.25 million units sold of Duke Nukem 3D by December 2002.

== Source ports ==
Following the release of the Doom source code in 1997, players wanted a similar source code release from 3D Realms. The last major game to make use of the Duke Nukem 3D source code was TNT Team's World War II GI in 1999. Its programmer, Matthew Saettler, obtained permission from 3D Realms to expand the gameplay enhancements done on WWII GI to Duke Nukem 3D.

EDuke was a semi-official branch of Duke Nukem 3D that was released as a patch as Duke Nukem 3D v2.0 for Atomic Edition users on July 28, 2000. It included a demo mod made by several beta testers. It focused primarily on enhancing the CON scripting language in ways which allowed those modifying the game to do much more with the system than originally possible. Though a further version was planned, it never made it out of beta. It was eventually cancelled due to programmer time constraints. About a month after the release of the Duke Nukem 3D source code, Blood project manager Matt Saettler released the source code for both EDuke v2.0 and EDuke v2.1, the test version of which would have eventually become the next EDuke release, under the GPL.

The source code to the Duke Nukem 3D v1.5 executable, which uses the Build engine, was released as free software under the GPL-2.0-or-later license on April 1, 2003. The game content remains under a proprietary license. The game was quickly ported by enthusiasts to modern operating systems.

The first Duke Nukem 3D port was from icculus.org. It is a cross-platform project that allows the game to be played on AmigaOS, AmigaOS 4, AROS, BeOS, FreeBSD, Linux, Mac OS X, MorphOS, Solaris, and Windows rather than MS-DOS. The icculus.org codebase would later be used as the base for several other ports, including Duke3d_32.

Another popular early project is Jonathon Fowler's JFDuke3D, which, in December 2003, received backing from the original author of Build, programmer Ken Silverman. Fowler, in cooperation with Silverman, released a new version of JFDuke3D using Polymost, an OpenGL-enhanced renderer for Build which allows hardware acceleration and 3D model support along with 32-bit color high resolution textures. Another project based on JFDuke3D called xDuke, unrelated to the xDuke project based on Duke3d_w32, runs on the Xbox. Silverman has since helped Fowler with a large portion of other engine work, including updating the network code, and helping to maintain various other aspects of the engine. Development was semi-active between 2005 and 2020; since then, new versions are regularly published.

While a few short-lived MS-DOS-based EDuke projects emerged, it was not until the release of EDuke32, an extended version of Duke3D incorporating variants of both Fowler's Microsoft Windows JFDuke3D code, and Saettler's EDuke code, by one of 3D Realms' forum moderators in late 2004, that EDuke's scripting extensions received community focus. Among the various enhancements, support for advanced shader model 3.0 based graphics was added to EDuke32 during late 2008-early 2009. In June 2008, thanks to significant porting contributions from the DOSBox team, EDuke32 became the only Duke Nukem 3D source port to compile and run natively on 64-bit Linux systems without the use of a 32-bit compatibility environment.

On April 1, 2009, an OpenGL Shader Model 3.0 renderer was revealed to have been developed for EDuke32, named Polymer to distinguish from Ken Silverman's Polymost. It allows for much more modern effects such as dynamic lighting and normal mapping. Although Polymer is fully functional, it is technically incomplete and unoptimized, and is still in development. As of the fifth installment of the High Resolution Pack, released in 2011, the Polymer renderer is mandatory. In 2011, another significant development of EDuke32 was the introduction of true room over room (TROR), where sectors can be placed over other sectors, and can be seen at the same time. In practice, this allows for true three-dimensional level design that was previously impossible, although the base engine is still 2D.

On December 18, 2012, the Chocolate Duke Nukem 3D source port was released. Inspired by Chocolate Doom, the primary goal was to refactor the code so developers could easily read and learn from it, as well as make it portable.

In February 2013, a source code review article was published that described the internal working of the code.

== Reception ==
Reception

Aggregate scores
Aggregator	Score
GameRankings	PC: 89% N64: 74% X360: 81% iOS: 64%
Metacritic	PC: 89/100; N64: 73/100; X360: 80/100; PS3: 70/100; VITA: 69/100 20th Anniversary World Tour; PC: 72/100; PS4: 77/100; XONE: 70/100

Review scores
Publication	Score
AllGame	4.5/5 (SAT)
Electronic Gaming Monthly	7/10; 8/10; 8/10; 7/10 (SAT); 8.0/10 (N64)
Famitsu	21/40 (PS1)
GameSpot	8.8/10 (PC); 7.3/10 (N64); 4.8/10 (PS1)
IGN	8/10 (N64); 7/10 (PS1)
N64 Magazine	86% (N64)
Next Generation	4/5 (PC, MAC); 3/5 (N64)
Maximum	5/5 (PC)
Sega Saturn Magazine	97% (SAT)
Computer Game Review	94/100

All versions of the game have earned a positive aggregate score on GameRankings and Metacritic. The original release on MS-DOS holds an aggregate score of 89% on GameRankings and a score of 89/100 on Metacritic. The version released on Nintendo 64 holds an aggregate score of 74% on GameRankings and a score of 73/100 on Metacritic. The version released on Xbox 360 holds an aggregate score of 81% on GameRankings while it holds a score of 80/100 on Metacritic. The iOS version holds an aggregate score of 64% on GameRankings.

Daniel Jevons of Maximum gave it five out of five stars, calling it "absolutely perfect in every respect." He particularly cited the game's speed and fluidity even on low-end PCs, imaginative weapons, varied and identifiable environments, true 3D level designs, and strong multiplayer mode. A Next Generation critic summarized: "Duke Nukem 3D has everything Doom doesn't, but it also doesn't leave out the stuff that made Doom a classic." He praised the imaginative weapons, long and complex single-player campaign, competitive multiplayer, built-in level editor, and parental lock. Reviewers paid a lot of attention to the sexual content within the game. Reception of this element varied: Tim Soete of GameSpot felt that it was "morally questionable", while the Game Revolution reviewer noted that it was "done in a tongue-in-cheek manner," and he was "not personally offended". GamingOnLinux reviewer Hamish Paul Wilson commented in a later retrospective how the game's "dark dystopian atmosphere filled with pornography and consumerist decadence" in his view helped to ground "the game's more outlandish and obscene moments in context", concluding that "in a world as perverse as this, someone like Duke becoming its hero seems almost inevitable."

Next Generation reviewed the Macintosh version of the game and stated that "Though it took a year, the Mac port of Duke Nukem 3D is an impressive feat, both for the game's own features, and the quality of the port."

The Saturn version also received generally positive reviews, with critics particularly praising the use of real-world settings for the levels and Duke's numerous one-liners. Reviewers were also generally impressed with how accurately it replicates the PC version. AllGame editor Colin Williamson highly praised the Sega Saturn port, referring to it as "one of the best versions" and that it was "probably one of the best console ports ever released." GamePro summarized that "All the gore, vulgarity, go-go dancers, and ultra-intense 3D combat action that made Duke Nukem [3D] excel on the PC are firmly intact in the Saturn version, making it one of the premier corridor shooters on the system." However, some complained at the limitations of this version's multiplayer. Dan Hsu of Electronic Gaming Monthly said it was unfortunate that it supports only two players instead of four, while Sega Saturn Magazine editor Rich Leadbetter complained at the multiplayer being only supported through the Sega NetLink and not the Saturn link cable, since the NetLink was not being released in Europe, effectively making the Saturn version single-player only to Europeans.

The Nintendo 64 version was likewise positively received, with critics almost overwhelmingly praising the new weapons and polygonal explosions, though some said that the use of sprites for most enemies and objects makes the game look outdated. While commenting that the deathmatch gameplay is less impressive than that of GoldenEye 007, critics also overwhelmingly applauded the port's multiplayer features. Next Generation stated that "The sound effects and music are solid, the levels are still interactive as heck, and it's never quite felt so good blasting enemies with a shotgun or blowing them to chunks with pipe bombs." GamePro opined that the censoring of sexual content from the port stripped the game of all uniqueness, but the vast majority of critics held that the censorship, though unfortunate, was not extensive enough to eliminate or even reduce Duke's distinctive personality. Peer Schneider of IGN called it "a better and much more intense shooter than Hexen and Doom 64, and currently the best N64 game with a two-player co-op mode. If you don't already own the PC or Saturn version of Duke, do yourself a favor and get it." Crispin Boyer of Electronic Gaming Monthly, while complaining that the large weapons obscure too much of the player's view in four-player mode, assessed that "You're not gonna find a better console version of Duke."

The PlayStation console port met with more mixed reviews. GamePro and Tim Soete of GameSpot both found this conversion technically inferior, particularly the frame rate. Both also complained that the control configuration only provides three presets, with no option for custom configuration. Soete also found the game had become dated by the time this version was released, though he still recommended it for those who do not own a PC. IGN's Jay Boor gave it a more enthusiastic recommendation, saying it "plays exactly like its PC predecessor" and praising the PlayStation-exclusive levels and link cable support.

Duke Nukem 3D was a finalist for CNET Gamecenter's 1996 "Best Action Game" award, which ultimately went to Quake. In 1996, Next Generation ranked it as the 35th top game of all time, called "for many, the game Quake should have been." In 1996 Computer Gaming World named Duke Nukem 3D #37 overall among the best games of all time and #13 among the "best ways to die in computer gaming". It won a 1996 Spotlight Award for Best Action Game. In 1998, PC Gamer declared it the 29th-best computer game ever released, and the editors called it "a gaming icon" and "an absolute blast".

PC Gamer magazine's readers' voted it #13 on its all-time top games poll. The editors of PC Game ranked it as the 12th top game of all time in 2001 citing the game's humor and pop-culture references, and as the 15th best games of all time in 2005. GamePro included it among the most important video games of all time. In 2009, IGN's Cam Shea ranked it as the ninth top 10 Xbox Live Arcade game, stating that it was as fun as it was in its initial release, and praised the ability to rewind to any point before the player died.

=== Controversy ===
Duke Nukem 3D was attacked by some critics, who alleged that it promoted pornography and murder. In response to the criticism encountered, censored versions of the game were released in certain countries in order to avoid it being banned altogether. A similar censored version was carried at Wal-Mart retail stores in the United States.

In Australia, the game was originally refused classification on release. 3D Realms repackaged the game with the parental lock feature permanently enabled, although a patch available on the 3D Realms website allowed the user to revert the game back into its uncensored U.S. version. The OFLC then attempted to have the game pulled from the shelves, but it was discovered that the distributor had notified them of this fact and the rating could not be surrendered; six months later, the game was reclassified and released uncensored with an MA15+ rating. In Germany, the BPjM placed the game on their "List B" ("List of Media Harmful to Young People") of videos games, thus prohibiting its advertisement in the public. However, it was not fully confiscated, meaning that an adult could still request to see the game and buy it. In 1999, Duke Nukem 3D was banned in Brazil, along with Doom and several other first-person shooters, after a rampage in and around a movie theater was supposedly inspired by the first level in the game.

Despite such concerns from critics, legislators, and publishers, Scott Miller later recounted that 3D Realms saw very little negative feedback to the game's controversial elements from actual gamers or their parents. He pointed out that Duke Nukem 3D was appropriately rated "M" and had no real nudity, and speculated that this was enough to make it inoffensive to the general public.
