= Duke Nukem: Zero Hour =

1999 video game

- North American box art
- Developer: Eurocom Entertainment Software
- Publisher: GT Interactive
- Composer: Neil Baldwin
- Series: Duke Nukem
- Platform: Nintendo 64
- Release: NA: August 31, 1999; EU: September 24, 1999
- Genre: Third-person shooter
- Modes: Single-player, multiplayer

Duke Nukem: Zero Hour is a 1999 third-person shooter game in the Duke Nukem series, developed by Eurocom and published by GT Interactive for the Nintendo 64. The game uses a relatively large 32 megabyte cartridge and can also use the Expansion Pak to improve graphics, though this slows down the frame rate. It features a 4-player split-screen multiplayer mode that uses a first-person view.

The plot revolves around time traveling aliens attempting to alter the course of history by eliminating Duke's ancestors. Locations, weapons, items, and clothing correspond to the time period Duke is in. Compared to the comically over-the-top tone used throughout most of the series, this game incorporates more mature plot elements, such as an encounter with Jack the Ripper near the still-fresh murder scene of Mary Jane Kelly in Victorian England and a serious depiction of a future New York devastated by atomic warfare.

== Plot ==
Duke is called into action by the government as aliens have once again landed and are wreaking havoc. Duke battles the alien menace through the streets of New York with the help of some Marines and eventually gains access to the Statue of Liberty. There, Duke uncovers the aliens' true plan: to travel back in time and alter historical events, ensuring Earth becomes a world they can easily conquer. However, during the fight, Duke is teleported to the future, where the aliens have won, and humans are on the brink of extinction. In this future, Duke battles new alien breeds and the zombified corpses of those who didn't survive the fallout. He eventually meets a small band of resistance fighters in the remnants of the U.S. Army headquarters in New York. The resistance informs Duke that the aliens are tampering with history, creating alternate futures. To restore the original timeline, Duke must fight back. The humans have developed a time machine to send a soldier back to rewrite history and destroy the aliens. Duke is sent to the Old West, where the aliens have taken control of parts of the American frontier and plan to detonate a bomb in Earth's core, threatening to destroy the planet.

In the Old West, Duke faces technical difficulties that force him to rely mostly on period-appropriate weapons, although a few of his modern weapons are sent back by his allies. The aliens have begun creating super-soldiers to fight both Duke and the humans of the future. After destroying a ship carrying the super-soldiers, Duke heads to Roswell, where he prevents the aliens from detonating the bomb. Duke is then informed that the aliens are not only altering America's past but have also traveled to the Victorian Era in London.

In Victorian London, Duke faces the alien-created biological weapons. Zombies roam the streets, and Brains float in the air. Duke defeats a mini-boss, the infamous Jack the Ripper. Duke fights his way toward a castle that the aliens have seized, blowing up a Zeppelin along the way. Inside the castle, he confronts the most horrific of the aliens' creations and finally faces off against the alien general—a giant brain. After destroying the castle and neutralizing the alien threat in this time period, Duke is ready for some rest and relaxation. Unfortunately, the aliens have caused a rift in the space-time continuum, and now more aliens from various points in history are flooding into New York in a last-ditch effort to wipe out humanity.

Duke once again fights through the city streets, eventually entering the alien mothership. He battles wave after wave of enemies, finally confronting the mastermind behind the chaos: Zero. Using the alien technology aboard the mothership, Duke battles Zero on the rooftops of the city. After defeating the creature, Duke restores the timeline and rids Manhattan of the alien menace. He then prepares to enjoy his well-deserved "reward."

== Reception ==
Reception

Aggregate score
Aggregator	Score
GameRankings	67%

Review scores
Publication	Score
Computer and Video Games	3/5
Edge	7/10
Electronic Gaming Monthly	5/10
Game Informer	8.75/10
GameFan	79% (G.N.) 64%
GamePro	4.5/5
GameRevolution	B−
Hyper	88%
IGN	7.9/10
Next Generation	1/5
Nintendo Power	7.9/10

Zero Hour received moderate review scores when originally released. The review aggregation website GameRankings places its aggregate at 67%, indicating mixed reviews, however this score is based on an unrepresentative sample of reviews.

Nintendo Power, IGN, Game Informer, and Gamepro gave it favorable reviews, commending the game's control, environments and multiplayer features, with Nintendo Power also highlighting the game's imaginative weapons. while Jeff Lundrigan of Next Generation advised that the game should be avoided "like radioactive bat droppings." and EGM criticised the game for being unoriginal.
