= List of video games in development =

This is a confirmed list of video games in development, but are scheduled for release beyond 2027 or currently carry no announced, reported, or confirmed release date at all.

== Legend ==
Video game platforms
DROID	Android	iOS	iOS, iPhone, iPod, iPadOS, iPad, visionOS, Apple Vision Pro	LIN	Linux, SteamOS
OSX	macOS	NS	Nintendo Switch	NS2	Nintendo Switch 2
PS4	PlayStation 4	PS5	PlayStation 5	PSVR	Playstation VR, PlayStation VR2
Quest	Meta Quest / Oculus Quest family, including Oculus Rift	SMS	Master System	WIN	Windows, all versions Windows 95 and up
XBO	Xbox One	XBX/S	Xbox Series X/S		

Types of releases
Compilation	A compilation, anthology or collection of several titles, usually (but not always) belonging to the same series
Early access	A game launched in early access is unfinished and thus might contain bugs and glitches or have some of the content missing
Episodic	An episodic video game that is released in batches over a period of time
Expansion	A large-scale DLC to an already existing game that adds new story, areas and additions and/or changes to the game's mechanics
Full release	A full release of a game that launched in early access first
Limited	A special release (often called "Limited" or "Collector's Edition") with bonus collector's material. Often provided to people who pre-order a game
Port	The game first appeared on a different platform and a port was made. The game is like the original, with few or no differences
Remake	The game is an enhanced remake of an original, made using a new engine and/or assets and thus containing completely new sound, graphics and possibly changes to the story and/or gameplay
Remaster	The game is a remaster of an original, released on the same or different platform, with (usually minor) changes to graphics, sound and/or gameplay
Rerelease	The game was re-released on the same platform with no or only minor changes

Video game genres
Action	Action game	Action RPG	Action role-playing game	Action-adventure	Action-adventure game
Adventure	Adventure game	Battle royale	Battle royale game	Brawler	Beat 'em up
Bullet heaven	Vampire Survivors–like	Bullet hell	Bullet hell	Business sim	Business simulation game
City builder	City-building game	CMS	Construction and management simulation	Dating sim	Dating sim
DCCG	Digital collectible card game	Deck building	Deck building game	Digital tabletop	Digital tabletop game
Dungeon crawl	Dungeon crawl	Extraction shooter	Extraction shooter	Farming	Farm life sim
Fighting	Fighting game	FPS	First-person shooter	God game	God game
Graphic adventure	Graphic adventure	Hack and slash	Hack and slash	Hero shooter	Hero shooter
Horror	Horror game	Immersive sim	Immersive sim	Interactive film	Interactive film
Life sim	Life simulation game	Metroidvania	Metroidvania	MMO	Massively multiplayer online game
MOBA	Multiplayer online battle arena	Monster tamer	Monster-taming game	Music	Music video game
Narrative adventure	Narrative adventure game	Otome	Otome game	Party	Party video game
PCA	Point-and-click adventure	Platform fighter	Platform fighter	Platformer	Platformer
Puzzle	Puzzle video game	Racing	Racing video game	Rhythm	Rhythm game
Roguelike	Roguelike, Roguelite	RPG	Role-playing video game	RTS	Real-time strategy
RTT	Real-time tactics	Run and gun	Run and gun game	Sandbox	Sandbox game
Scrolling shooter	Scrolling shooter	Shoot 'em up	Shoot 'em up	Shooter	Shooter game
Simulation	Simulation video game	Social sim	Social simulation game	Soulslike	Soulslike
Sports	Sports video game	Stealth	Stealth game	Strategy	Strategy video game
Survival	Survival game	Survival horror	Survival horror	Tactical RPG	Tactical role-playing game
Tactical shooter	Tactical shooter	TBS	Turn-based strategy	Tower defense	Tower defense
TPS	Third-person shooter	Vehicular combat	Vehicular combat game	Virtual pet	Virtual pet
Visual novel	Visual novel				

== 2028 ==
Title	Approximate date (Note: The calendar year is divided into four quarters, often abbreviated Q1 (January to March), Q2 (April to June), Q3 (July to September) and Q4 (October to December).)	Platform(s)	Type(s)	Genre(s)	Developer(s)	Publisher(s)	Ref.
Aether Wizard Life	Q3/Q4	WIN, NS2, PS5, XBX/S	Original	Life sim, Adventure	Vonder Games	Kinetic Publishing	
Alkimya: House of Wisdom	Unknown	WIN, PS5	Original	Survival horror, Action-adventure	Iksyr		
Amphibian	Unknown	WIN, OSX, LIN, NS, PS5, XBX/S	Original	RPG	Jarcorp Interactive		
Ark 2	Unknown	WIN, XBX/S	Full release	MMO, RPG, Action-adventure, Survival	Studio Wildcard		
Dawngazer	Unknown	WIN, NS2, PS5	Original	Action RPG	Monochrome Corporation	Good Smile Company	
Dead Island 3	Q1/Q2	Unknown	Original	Action RPG, Survival horror	Dambuster Studios	Deep Silver	
Final Boss: The Video Game	Q4	WIN	Original	Brawler, Fighting	Bit Bot Media, Mecanimal Games	Bit Bot Media	
GeniGods: Nezha	Unknown	WIN, PS5	Original	Action RPG	Genigods Lab		
Heima	Unknown	WIN	Original	Action-adventure, Puzzle	Kenei Design, Amber Games	Amber Games	
Kaelis: Seraph Protocol	Unknown	WIN	Original	RPG	YoshiYoshi Studio		
Neo Berlin 2087	Unknown	WIN, PS5, XBX/S	Original	Action RPG	Elysium Game Studio	ByteRockers' Games	
Omniscient Reader's Viewpoint	Unknown	WIN, MOBI, consoles	Original	Action RPG	Offbeat	Com2uS	
Paper Perjury 2: Shadow of Justice	Unknown	WIN, NS2, PS5, XBX/S	Original	Adventure, Visual novel	Paper Cat Games		
Precognition	Q1/Q2	WIN, NS2, PS5, XBX/S	Original	Interactive film, Horror	Half Mermaid Productions	Kinetic Publishing	
Shellbound	Q2/Q3	WIN, NS2, PS5, XBX/S	Original	Metroidvania	Fake Lobster Games	Kinetic Publishing	
Shibuya Scramble Stories	Unknown	WIN	Original	Interactive film, Adventure	Jiro Ishii, Tokyu Land, Skeleton Crew Studio	Unknown	
Thimbleweed Park 2	Q1/Q2	WIN, OSX, LIN, NS	Original	PCA	Terrible Toybox		
Tomb Raider: Catalyst	Unknown	WIN, PS5, XBX/S	Original	Action-adventure	Crystal Dynamics	Amazon Game Studios	
Under Mythos	Unknown	WIN, NS	Original	RPG	Kadath		
Wardogs	Unknown	PS5, XBX/S	Port	FPS	Bulkhead	Team17	
The Witcher IV	Unknown	WIN, PS5, XBX/S	Original	Action RPG	CD Projekt Red	CD Projekt	
Wonderful Neoran Valley	Unknown	WIN, NS2, PS5	Original	Monster tamer, Roguelite	Nara Studio		
WPCA: World Phasebound Control Authority	Unknown	WIN, PS5	Original	Action	5minlab	Krafton	

== 2029 ==
Title	Approximate date	Platform(s)	Type(s)	Genre(s)	Developer(s)	Publisher(s)	Ref.
Cookie Run: New World	Unknown	WIN, iOS, DROID, consoles	Original	Adventure	Devsisters		
Diablo V	Q1/Q2	Unknown	Original	Action RPG, Hack and slash	Blizzard Entertainment		

== 2030 ==
Title	Approximate date	Platform(s)	Type(s)	Genre(s)	Developer(s)	Publisher(s)	Ref.
StarCraft	Unknown	Unknown	Original	Shooter	Blizzard Entertainment		

== In development ==
Title	Platform(s)	Type(s)	Genre(s)	Developer(s)	Publisher(s)	Ref.
4:Loop	WIN, PS5		TPS	Bad Robot Games	Sony Interactive Entertainment	
7 Trials	WIN, PS5, XBX/S	Original	Action, Roguelite	Newcore Games		
9 Yin Sutra: Immortal	WIN	Original	Sandbox, Survival	Snail Games		
1001 Threads of Mizan	WIN, NS2, PS5, XBX/S	Original	Action-adventure	MBC Game Studio		
1666: Amsterdam	WIN, consoles	Full release	Action-adventure	Panache Digital Games		
About Fishing	WIN, PS5	Original	Adventure	The Water Museum	Playstack	
Abyss X Zero	WIN		Metroidvania	Studio Pixel Punk		
Aether Dawn	WIN, iOS, DROID	Original	Action RPG, Hack and slash	Jin Universe Studios		
[Afantasia]	WIN	Original	Narrative adventure	noidnoidnoid	Studio Sasanqua	
Aftergods	WIN, PS5, XBX/S	Original	Action RPG, Survival	Norsfell Games		
Afterworld	WIN, OSX, LIN, NS2, PS5, XBX/S	Original	Grand strategy	Paradox Development Studio	Paradox Interactive	
Aleste Branch	NS, PS4		Scrolling shooter (vertical)	M2		
Alien: Isolation 2	WIN, NS2, PS5, XBX/S	Original	Survival horror	Creative Assembly	Sega	
Alpha Nomos	PS5, XBX/S	Port	Action, Rhythm, Roguelite	RibCage Games		
Always in Mind	WIN		Adventure, Action, Platformer	Inevitable Studios		
Amnesia: The Bunker	NS	Port	Survival horror	Abylight Studios	Frictional Games	
Animula Nook	WIN, OSX, NS2, PS5		Life sim	LilliLandia Games	Tencent Games	
Arkheron	WIN, PS5, XBX/S	Original	Action	Bonfire Studios	Bonfire Studios, Drimage	
Armed Police Batrider	Unknown	Port	Scrolling shooter (vertical)	M2		
Untitled Art of Fighting game	Unknown		Fighting	SNK		
Artificial Detective	WIN, XBX/S	Original	Action-adventure	Vivix		
Ascenders: Beyond the Peak	WIN, consoles	Full release	Roguelite	Ludogram	Twin Sails Interactive	
Assassin's Creed: Codename Hexe	Unknown	Original	Action-adventure	Ubisoft Montreal	Ubisoft	
Assassin's Creed: Codename Invictus	Unknown	Original	Action-adventure	Ubisoft Montreal	Ubisoft	
Assassin's Creed Jade	iOS, DROID	Original	Action RPG	Unknown	Level Infinite	
Astrae Oratio	WIN	Port	RPG	Dynamis One	NC	
Atlyss	WIN	Full release	Action RPG	Kiseff	KisSoft	
Attention Addicted NEET	WIN	Original	Visual novel	Dreamery	Kniv Studio	
Azur Promilia (WW)	WIN, PS5, iOS, DROID	Full release	Action RPG	Manjuu		
Babylon X	WIN		Action RPG	Mighty Boy Studio		
Back in Time	WIN, OSX, NS, PS5, XBX/S		Action-adventure	Omnaya Studios		
Bad Ice-Cream Resort	WIN, OSX, NS	Original	Puzzle	Nitrome		
Bad Ice-Cream Triple Scoop	WIN, OSX, NS	Compilation, Remaster	Puzzle	Nitrome		
Ballad of Antara	WIN, PS5, iOS, DROID		Action RPG	TipsWorks	Infold Games	
Bancho the Chef	WIN, PS5	Original	Adventure	Mintrocket		
BeastLink	WIN, PS5, XBX/S	Full release	Action	Grove Street Games		
Beholder IV	WIN	Original	Adventure	Alawar Entertainment		
Bel's Fanfare	WIN, NS, NS2, PS5	Original	Action-adventure, RPG	Chibig		
Beyond All Reason	WIN, LIN		RTS	BAR Team	Hooded Horse	
Billie Bust Up	WIN	Original	Platformer	Giddy Goat Games	Balor Games	
BioShock 4	Unknown	Original	FPS	Cloud Chamber	2K	
Blackfrost: The Long Dark 2	WIN	Full release	Survival	Hinterland Studio		
Black Myth: Zhong Kui	WIN	Original	Action RPG	Game Science		
Black State	WIN		TPS, Action-adventure	Motion Blur		
BlazBlue: Central Fiction	PS5	Port	Fighting	Arc System Works		
Blood Message	WIN		Action-adventure	24 Entertainment Lin'an	NetEase Games	
Bloomwalker	WIN, NS, NS2, PS5, XBX/S	Original	Adventure	Netmarble Neo	Netmarble	
Blue Ridge Hunting	WIN, LIN	Full release	Horror	Jade & Company	Six One Publishing	
Bodycam	WIN	Full release	FPS	Reissad Studio		
Book Nook	WIN, OSX	Original	Puzzle	Malapata Studio	WINGS	
Bradley the Badger	WIN	Original	Platformer, Action-adventure, Puzzle	Day 4 Night Studios	Focus Entertainment	
Brighter Shores	WIN, OSX	Full release	MMO, RPG	Fen Research		
Bringer	WIN, PS5, iOS, DROID	Original	Action RPG	YHKT Entertainment		
BrokenLore: Dark Dawn	WIN, PS5, XBX/S		Horror	Serafini Productions		
BrokenLore: Don't Play	WIN, NS2, PS5, XBX/S		Horror	Serafini Productions		
Buckshot Roulette	NS, PS4, PS5	Port	Horror, Strategy	Mike Klubnika	Critical Reflex	
Build Order	Unknown		Action	Alvion		
Bunnies High School (JP)	NS		Otome, Visual novel	Otomate	Idea Factory	
Bunraku	WIN, NS2, PS5	Original	Platform fighter	Efecto Studios		
Burning Sword: Death Sun	WIN	Full release	Hack and slash, Action	Nomadic Games		
Bye Bye Bonnie	WIN	Original	Platformer	Brainwash Gang	Raw Fury	
Cat and Paste!	WIN, OSX	Original	Party	BeXide		
Calme	WIN, NS		Adventure	Doukutsu Penguin Club		
Carcass Clad	WIN	Original	Horror	Wrong Organ		
Carrier Command 2	NS, NS2, PS5, XBX/S	Port	RTS	Geometa	MicroProse, Infogrames	
Catechesis	WIN, NS, PS4, PS5, XBO, XBX/S	Original	Horror, RPG	Baroque Decay		
Chasing Kaleidorider	WIN, DROID, iOS		RPG	Fizzglee Studio		
Children in the Flesh	WIN		Unknown	Grounding Inc.		
Chosen by Odin	WIN, LIN, XBX/S	Original	Action RPG, Roguelite	Bedtime Digital Games		
Chronicles: Medieval	WIN	Full release	Action, Sandbox	Raw Power Games		
Cinder City	WIN		MMO, Tactical shooter	BigFire Games	NC	
Clowntown	WIN	Original	Party	Batterystaple Games		
Combo Devils	WIN		Platform fighter	Punkzilla		
Construction Simulator: Evolution	WIN, PS5, XBX/S	Early access	Simulation	weltenbauer. Software Entwicklung	Astragon	
Cordura	WIN, PS5	Original	Horror (psych)	Garage51		
Core Decay	WIN, LIN		FPS, Immersive sim	Slipgate Ironworks	3D Realms	
Cosmi: Forbidden Forest & Beyond	WIN, NS, PS5	Compilation	—N/a	Empty Clip Studios	Ziggurat Interactive	
Coven of the Chicken Foot	WIN		Puzzle, Platformer, Adventure	Wildflower Interactive		
The Crab is Walking	WIN	Original	City builder, Roguelite	Hypnohead	tinyBuild	
Crescent Tower: Rising	WIN		RPG	Curry Croquette	AMATA Games	
Crossfire	WIN, PS5, XBX/S	Original	TPS, Action-adventure	That's No Moon	Team K1, Smilegate	
Crosswinds	WIN	Original	Adventure	Octeto Studios		
Crowns and Pawns: Amber Road	WIN	Original	Adventure	Tag of Joy	Headup Games	
Crowsworn	WIN, OSX, LIN, NS, PS5, XBX/S		Metroidvania	Mongoose Rodeo		
Crystal Project II	WIN, OSX, LIN	Original	RPG	River Running Games		
Untitled Cuphead sequel	Unknown	Original	Run and gun	Studio MDHR		
.curator	WIN, OSX, LIN, PS5, XBX/S	Original	Adventure, RPG	STRL Games		
Cybernetic Attack: Final Mission	Unknown	Remake	Shoot 'em up	Tengo Project	Winning Entertainment Group	
Cyberpunk 2	Unknown	Original	Action RPG	CD Projekt Red	CD Projekt	
Danmaku Unlimited 4 Wyver Ultra	WIN		Shoot 'em up	Doragon Entertainment		
Dark and Darker	WIN	Full release	Dungeon crawl, Action RPG	Ironmace		
Dark Deity 3	WIN	Original	Tactical RPG	Sword & Axe	indie.io	
Dark Light: Survivor	WIN, PS5, XBX/S	Full release	Action, Roguelike, Survival	Mirari & Co.		
Darksiders 4	WIN, PS5, XBX/S	Original	Hack and slash, Action-adventure	Gunfire Games	THQ Nordic	
darkwebSTREAMER	WIN		Horror (psych), Rougelite, RPG, Simulation	We Have Always Lived In The Forest		
Darkwood II	WIN	Original	Survival horror	Ice-Pick Lodge	Hooded Horse	
Dash'n'Drops	WIN, NS, NS2, PS5, XBX/S	Full release	Platformer, Roguelite	Le Moulin aux Bulles		
Dead as Disco	WIN	Full release	Brawler, Rythem	Brain Jar Games		
Dead of Darkness 2	WIN, NS, PS4, PS5, XBO, XBX/S	Original	Survival horror	Retrofiction Games	Retrofiction Games, Eastasiasoft (Consoles)	
Dead or Alive New Project	PS5	Original	Fighting	Team Ninja	Koei Tecmo	
Deadlock	WIN	Original	TPS, MOBA	Valve		
DeadRoot	WIN, XBX/S	Original	Metroidvania	Finish Line Games		
Untitled Death end re;Quest mainline game	Unknown		RPG	Compile Heart	Idea Factory	
Death Trash	WIN, OSX, LIN	Full release	RPG	Crafting Legends		
Deep Rock Galactic: Rogue Core	WIN	Full release	FPS, Roguelike	Ghost Ship Games	Ghost Ship Publishing	
The Defiant	WIN, PS5, XBX/S	Original	FPS	Hoothanes	4Divinity	
DELIVERY MUST COMPLETE	WIN	Original	Action, Rougelike	Yoyoyollie	Top Hat Studios	
Deltarune: Chapter 7	WIN, OSX, NS, NS2, PS4, PS5	Episode	RPG, Adventure	Toby Fox, 8-4 (consoles)		
Detained: Too Good for School	WIN	Full release	Action RPG, Brawler	O.T.K Games	Thermite Games	
Devil Blade Reboot Consumer Edition	Consoles	Port	Scrolling shooter (vertical)	Shigatake Games	M2	
Dioxide	WIN	Original	Soulslike, FPS	Byte Barrel		
Divinity	Unknown	Original	Action RPG	Larian Studios		
DoDonPachi Resurrection Reignite	WIN	Remaster	Bullet hell	Cave		
DokeV	WIN, PS5, XBX/S	Original	Action-adventure	Pearl Abyss		
Don't Starve Elsewhere	WIN	Original	Survival	Klei Entertainment		
Dragon Quest XII: Beyond Dreams	Unknown	Original	RPG	Square Enix, Orca, HexaDrive	Square Enix	
Dungeon & Fighter: Arad	WIN, MOBI		Action-adventure, RPG	Nexon		
Echoes of Mystralia	WIN	Full release	Roguelike, Action RPG	Borealys Games		
echograph	WIN	Original	Survival horror	Pappy's Pipe Dream		
El Shaddai: Ascension of the Metatron HD Remaster	PS5	Remaster	Action-adventure	crim	crim, Rainy Frog	
The Elder Scrolls VI: Sentinel	Unknown	Original	Action RPG	Bethesda Game Studios	Bethesda Softworks	
Elderborn: Vengeance	WIN	Original	Hack and slash	Hyperstrange		
Ember & Blade	WIN, OSX, LIN, PS5, XBX/S	Full release	Action RPG, Rougelike	LINE Games Corporation		
Empulse	WIN, PS5, XBX/S	Full release	FPS	1047 Games		
Enter the Gungeon 2	WIN, NS2	Original	Bullet hell, Roguelike	Dodge Roll	Devolver Digital	
Etre	WIN	Original	Metroidvania	Studio Lifeforms		
The Eventide	WIN	Original	Adventure	Studio Reset		
Ever After Again: A Stories Adventure	WIN, PS5, XBX/S	Original	Action RPG	Spearhead Games		
ExeKiller	WIN	Original	Action-adventure	Paradark Studio	505 Games	
Exstetra (WW)	NS, NS2, PS5	Port	RPG	FuRyu, Studio Saizensen	FuRyu	
Fables of Dwale	WIN	Original	Adventure	Pixel Maniacs	Unknown	
Fallen Aces	WIN	Full release	FPS	Trey Powell, Jason Bond	New Blood Interactive	
Untitled Fallout game	WIN, XBX/S	Original	Action RPG	Obsidian Entertainment, Bethesda Game Studios	Xbox Game Studios	
Fallout 3 remaster	Unknown	Remaster	Action RPG	Bethesda Game Studios	Xbox Game Studios	
Fallout 5	Unknown	Original	Action RPG	Bethesda Game Studios	Xbox Game Studios	
Fallout: New Vegas remaster	Unknown	Remaster	Action RPG	Obsidian Entertainment, Bethesda Game Studios	Xbox Game Studios	
Fareidolia	WIN, iOS, DROID	Original	Narrative adventure	IO Division, RX Studio	Nexon	
Untitled Farland Saga game	Unknown		Tactical RPG	Entergram	Unknown	
Fate Trigger	WIN, PS5	Full release	Hero shooter, Tactical shooter	Saroasis Studios		
Fatekeeper	WIN	Full release	Action RPG	Paraglacial	THQ Nordic	
Fiesta Online	NS, PS5, XBX/S	Port	MMORPG	gamigo		
Floatopia	WIN, NS, PS5, XBX/S, iOS, DROID		Life sim	NetEase Games		
For the Stars	WIN, PS5, XBX/S		Survival, Sandbox	Snail		
Forest 3	WIN		Survival horror	Endnight Games		
Fractured Blooms	WIN		Horror, Life sim	Serenity Forge		
Full Circle	WIN	Original	RPG	2nd Player Games	Deck13 Spotlight	
Future GPX Cyber Formula Spiral	Unknown	Original	Racing	Project YNP		
Galix: New Horizons	WIN, PS5		Action RPG	Magicfish Games		
Garnet Arena: Mages of Magicary	Unknown	Original	Action	Cygames		
Gemini X	WIN	Original	Metroidvania	Komi Games		
gen ATLAS	WIN, PS5, XBX/S	Original	Action-adventure	genDESIGN	Epic Games Publishing	
Ghostless	WIN, PS5, XBX/S	Original	Action-adventure	Coffeenauts		
Gley Lancer: Overdrive	WIN, NS, PS4, PS5, XBX/S	Remake	Scrolling shooter	Nalua Studio		
Gloomwood	WIN	Full release	Immersive sim, Stealth, Horror	New Blood Interactive		
God of War Trilogy Remake	PS5	Remake	Action-adventure	Santa Monica Studio	Sony Interactive Entertainment	
Untitled God of War game	PS5	Original	Action-adventure	Santa Monica Studio	Sony Interactive Entertainment	
Untitled Golden Axe game	Unknown		Action-adventure	Unknown	Sega	
Graft	WIN		Survival horror, RPG	Harebrained Schemes		
Gravastar	WIN, NS2, PS5, XBX/S	Original	RPG	Studio Atma		
Ground Branch	WIN	Full release	Tactical shooter, FPS	BlackFoot Studios	MicroProse	
Grounded 2	WIN, XBX/S	Full release	Survival, Action-adventure	Obsidian Entertainment, Eidos-Montréal	Xbox Game Studios	
Guild Wars 3	WIN, PS5	Original	MMO, RPG	ArenaNet		
Gundam Blitz Order	iOS, DROID	Original	Simulation	Bandai Namco Entertainment		
Guns & Dragons	WIN	Original	FPS, Roguelite	ABUTTON Inc.		
Guns Undarkness	WIN	Full release	Stealth, RPG	MegaRock	Kodansha	
Hack '95	WIN	Original	Simulation	Village Studio		
.hack//Z.E.R.O.	Unknown	Original	Action RPG	CyberConnect2		
Untitled Halo mainline game	WIN, XBX/S	Original	FPS	Activision	Xbox Game Studios	
Happy Bastards	WIN	Original	Tactical RPG	Clever Plays		
Harmonium: The Musical	WIN, XBO, XBX/S		Music, Adventure	The Odd Gentlemen	Unknown	
Haunted Chocolatier	WIN		Simulation	ConcernedApe		
Hayaku! Island of Darkness	WIN		Metroidvania	Pizia Studios		
Hell Maiden	WIN	Full release	Deck building, Roguelike, Bullet heaven	AstralShift		
Hellgate: Redemption	WIN		Action RPG	Lunacy Games		
Hello Neighbor 3	WIN	Original	Survival horror, Stealth	Eerie Guest Studios	tinyBuild	
High on Life VR	WIN, PS5, PSVR, Quest	Original	FPS	Flat2VR Studios, Squanch Games	Impat Inked	
High Roller Penny	WIN	Original	Roguelike	Kniv Studio		
Hijinks High	WIN, consoles	Original	Party	Sackbird Studios		
Hobnobbers	WIN		Platformer	Snoozy Kazoo		
Hogwarts Legacy 2	WIN	Original	Action RPG	Avalanche Software	Warner Bros. Games	
Honkai: Nexus Anima	WIN, iOS		Monster tamer, Adventure, Strategy	miHoYo		
Hopetown	Unknown	Original	RPG	Longdue		
Hordeguard: Winds of the North	WIN	Original	Action, Tower defense	Black Deer Games	Daedalic Entertainment	
Horizon Hunters Gathering	WIN, PS5	Original	Action RPG	Guerrilla Games	Sony Interactive Entertainment	
Hotel Galactic	WIN, NS	Full release	CMS	Ancient Forge		
Hytale	WIN, OSX, LIN	Full release	Sandbox	Hypixel Studios		
Iconology	WIN, NS		Adventure, Visual novel	IFChronicle	Idea Factory	
The Idolmaster SideM	NS, NS2	Original	Raising sim, Rhythm	D3 Publisher		
Infection Free Zone	WIN	Full release	RTS, Survival	Jutsu Games	Games Operators	
Into the Wind	WIN	Early access	Adventure	Bloom & Gloom	Three Friends	
Inazuma Eleven: Bold Revolution	Unknown		RPG, Sports	Level-5		
Izuna	WIN, NS		Dungeon crawl	Success		
Jasmine	Unknown		Visual novel	Aquaplus		
JDM: Ph4ntom Driver	WIN	Original	Racing (arcade)	Gaming Factory		
Untitled Jet Set Radio game	Unknown		Action	Unknown	Sega	
Untitled John Wick game	WIN, PS5, XBX/S	Original	TPS	Saber Interactive		
Judas	WIN, PS5, XBX/S		FPS	Ghost Story Games		
Jurassic Park: Survival	WIN, PS5, XBX/S	Original	Action-adventure	Saber Interactive		
Kemono Teatime	NS2, PS5	Port	Adventure, CMS	Studio Lalala		
Killer Inn	WIN	Full release	Action	Square Enix, Tactic Studios	Square Enix	
Kingdom Come: Salvation	Unknown	Original	Action RPG	Warhorse Studios	Unknown	
Kingmakers	WIN	Full release	TPS, Strategy	Redemption Road Games	tinyBuild	
Kitaria Fables 2	WIN, NS2, PS5, XBX/S	Original	Action RPG	Secret Level Studios, Twin Hearts	PQube	
Knights of the Fall	WIN, OSX, LIN		Action, Platformer	Airo Games	Bohemia Interactive	
Knight's Path	WIN		Action RPG	Jan Tichota and Aamn Chahrour		
KochiKame: Ryo-san's Billion-yen Beat	WIN, NS, NS2, PS4, PS5, XBX/S, iOS, DROID		Simulation	Kairosoft	Shueisha Games	
KoRobo	WIN, LIN, consoles	Original	Action-adventure	Tiny Wonder Studio		
Koyorenium	Unknown	Original	Visual novel	Entergram		
Kriegsfront Tactics	WIN, NS, PS5, XBX/S		Tactical RPG	Toge Productions		
Kyora	WIN, LIN	Full release	Sandbox, Survival, Adventure	Pugstorm	Chucklefish	
La Divina Commedia	WIN		Action RPG	Jyamma Games		
La Quimera	WIN	Full release	FPS	Reburn		
Langrisser: Sea of Sword	WIN, iOS, DROID	Original	Tactical RPG	BlackJack Studio		
Last Drop	WIN	Full release	Action-adventure	Lohkare Games		
Last Epoch	PS5		Action RPG	Eleventh Hour Games		
Last Harbor	WIN	Original	Survival horror	tinyBuild		
Last Sentinel	Unknown	Original	Action	Lightspeed LA	LightSpeed Studios	
Layers of Fear 3	Unknown	Original	Horror	Bloober Team		
The Legend of California	WIN	Full Release	FPS, Survival	Kintsugiyama	Dreamhaven	
Lego Skylines	WIN, NS2, PS5, XBX/S	Original	City builder	Iceflake Studios	Paradox Interactive	
Light No Fire	WIN		Survival, Adventure	Hello Games		
Lightspeed Lina	WIN	Original	Platformer	CornflowerBlue		
Like or Die	WIN	Original	FPS, Battle royale	NC		
Little Devil Inside	WIN, PS4, PS5		Action-adventure	Neostream Interactive		
Locator: The Search for Abigail Lidari	WIN	Original	Narrative adventure	Empty Exhibit	Playstack	
Lofsong	WIN, PS5, XSX/S	Original	Adventure, Puzzle	Unrelated Studio		
Lost & Found	WIN, consoles	Original	Adventure	ShaggyBearGames		
Lost Order	iOS, DROID	Original	RTT	PlatinumGames, CyDesignation	Cygames	
Lost Rift	WIN	Full release	Survival, FPS	People Can Fly		
Loulan: The Cursed Sand	WIN, PS5		Action RPG	ChillyRoom		
Lucid Falls	WIN	Original	Survival horror	Eldamar Studios		
LunaReverse	WIN, NS	Original	Visual novel	CYBIRD	Aniplex	
Machinarium 2	WIN, OSX	Original	PCA, Puzzle	Amanita Design		
Mage Arena	WIN	Full release	Action	jrsjams		
Magical Blush	NS, NS2, PS5, XBX/S	Port	Action-adventure	Alkacer Game Studio	DANGEN Entertainment	
Majjam	WIN		MMO, Adventure	Opus Major		
Mamorukun Curse! 2	Unknown		Shoot 'em up	G.rev, City Connection	City Connection	
Mandrake	WIN		Farming, RPG	Failbetter Games		
Manor Lords	WIN	Full release	RTS, City builder	Slavic Magic	Hooded Horse	
March of Giants	WIN		MOBA, Strategy	Amazon Games Montreal	Ubisoft	
Marvel's Blade	Unknown	Original	Action-adventure	Arkane Lyon	Bethesda Softworks	
Marvel's Iron Man	Unknown	Original	Action-adventure	Motive	Electronic Arts	
Max Payne 1 & 2 Remake	WIN, PS5, XBX/S	Remake	TPS	Remedy Entertainment	Rockstar Games	
Untitled Middle-earth role-playing game	Unknown	Original	Action RPG	Warhorse Studios	Unknown	
Mighty Cuphead Adventure	WIN, SMS	Original	Run and gun	Studio MDHR		
Mindwave	WIN	Original	Action	HoloHammer		
Mobile Suit Gundam: Battle Operation 3	WIN, PS5	Original	Action	Bandai Namco Forge Digitals	Bandai Namco Entertainment	
Mouse Work	NS2		Party	Nitrome		
Mr. Records	WIN, NS2, PS5, XBX/S	Original	Adventure, Rhythm	Glee-Cheese Studio	Wired Productions	
Mr Trippy	WIN	Original	Simulation	Silver Bullet	Silver Lining Interactive	
My Ransomware Can't Be This Cute?!	WIN	Original	Deck building, Rougelike	The Seppuku Commission	Top Hat Studios	
Mysplaced	WIN, PS4, PS5, XBO, XBX/S	Original	Metroidvania	Clear Sky Games		
Myths from the Maw	WIN, OSX, LIN	Original	Tactical RPG	Half Human Games		
Netcode Warriors	WIN		Fighting	Son Studios		
Never Alone 2	WIN	Original	Puzzle, Platformer	E-Line Media	Balor Games	
Never Grave: The Witch and The Curse	DROID	Port	Metroidvania, Action, Roguelike	Frontside 180 Studio	Pocketpair Publishing	
The Night Wanderer	WIN, PS5, XBX/S		Action RPG, Soulslike	Mighty Koi		
Nightingale	WIN	Full release	Survival	Inflexion Games		
NIGHTMARE OPERATOR	WIN	Original	Action, Horror, TPS	DDDistortion	Shueisha	
Nodusfall	Unknown	Original	Action RPG	miHoYo	HoYoverse	
No Rest for the Wicked	NS2, XBX/S	Port	Action RPG	Moon Studios		
Normal Fishing	WIN	Original	Adventure, Horror	The Bworg	Pocketpair	
OD	Unknown	Original	Horror	Kojima Productions	Xbox Game Studios	
Of Ash and Steel	PS5, XBX/S	Port	Action RPG	Fire & Frost	tinyBuild	
Untitled Ōkami sequel	Unknown	Original	Action-adventure	Clovers, M-Two, Machine Head Works	Capcom	
OmOchim	WIN, OSX	Original	CMS, Puzzle, Sandbox	Asobism		
Ordinary Oddness	WIN, PS5, XSX/S	Original	Action RPG	Cosmicpup Studio		
Ornelia	WIN	Original	City builder (village), God game	Gameleon Studio		
Pale Tide	WIN	Original	Extraction shooter	Aberratic		
Palworld! More Than Just Pals	WIN	Original	Dating sim	Pocketpair		
Palworld: Palfarm	WIN		Farming	Pocketpair		
Panzer Dragoon II Zwei: Remake	WIN, NS, PS4, PS5, XBO, XBX/S	Remake	Shoot 'em up (rail)	MegaPixel Studio, Storm Trident	Forever Entertainment	
Papaya Plaza	WIN	Original	City builder (village)	Biscuit Factory Games	Weekend Games	
Paralives	WIN	Full release	Life sim	Paralives Studio		
Paranormal Tales	WIN		Survival horror	Horror Cam Committee	Digital Cybercherries	
The Path of the Warrior: Art of Fighting 3 R	WIN	Remaster	Fighting	Code Mystics	SNK	
Pearl In Blue	iOS, DROID	Original	Dating sim, RPG, Visual novel	Netmarble N2	Netmarble	
Penny Blood	WIN, PS5, XBX/S	Original	RPG	Yukikaze, Shade, Studio Wildrose	Yukikaze	
Peripeteia	WIN	Full release	FPS, Imersive sim	Ninth Exodus		
Persona 6	WIN, NS2, PS5, XBX/S	Original	RPG, Social sim	P-Studio	JP: Atlus; WW: Sega	
Physint	XBX/S	Original	Stealth, Action	Kojima Productions	Xbox Game Studios	
Pipes.exe	WIN	Original	Horror	Moving Pieces Interactive	Critical Reflex	
PixelJunk Monsters 3	WIN	Original	Tower defense	Q-Games		
Plan 8	WIN, PS5, XBX/S	Original	MMO, TPS	Pearl Abyss		
Plan-[ki]	WIN, MOBI	Original	Tactical RPG	C2 Architecture		
P.O.N.	WIN	Original	Action, Horror, Stealth	Team VAC	Spaghetti Cat	
Pratfall	NS2, PS5, XBX/S	Port	Adventure	Quad Head	Daedalic Entertainment	
Prison Architect 2	WIN, PS5, XBX/S		CMS	Double Eleven, Kokku	Paradox Interactive	
Project Awakening	PS4	Original	Action RPG	Cygames Osaka	Cygames	
Project Code M	WIN, NS, PS5		Adventure	NOVECT	Aksys Games	
Project Delta	Unknown		Unknown	People Can Fly	Sony Interactive Entertainment	
Project Ethos	WIN, PS5, XBX/S		Hero shooter, Extraction shooter, Roguelike	31st Union	2K	
Project Kizuna	Unknown		RPG	Aquaplus		
Project Overkill	WIN, iOS, DROID		Action RPG	Neople	Nexon	
Project Spectrum	WIN		FPS	Team Jade	TiMi Studio Group	
Project Rene	iOS, DROID		Life sim	Maxis	Electronic Arts	
Project Retrograde: The Becoming	WIN, PS5, XBX/S		Action, Survival	Invercity Game Works		
Project Windless	WIN, PS5	Original	Action RPG	Krafton Montreal Studio	Krafton	
Project Zeta	WIN	Original	MOBA	Nirvanana	Krafton	
Project Zircon	WIN	Original	Deck building, Roguelike	Konami Digital Entertainment		
Project Zomboid	WIN, LIN, OSX	Full release	Survival, RPG	The Indie Stone		
PUBG: DET.NET	WIN, PS5, XBX/S	Original	FPS	PUBG Studios	Krafton	
Radiant Starlets	WIN, NS2, PS5, XBX/S		Action, Platformer, Dating sim	Buster X Buster		
Raji: Kaliyuga	WIN, PS5, XBX/S		Action-adventure	Nodding Heads Games		
RatScum	WIN		Adventure	Eclair Games		
Red Rooster	WIN, NS2, PS5, XBX/S	Original	RPG	Summer Eternal		
Remaining Grace	WIN, OSX	Original	Adventure	ambedo studios		
Return to Zeroes	WIN	Original	Adventure	Onimushi Hyogo	Tabinomichi	
RGB: Execution	WIN	Original	Action	Purechito	Top Hat Studios	
Rhapsody in Scarlet	WIN, PS5, XBX/S	Original	Action-adventure	Konami Digital Entertainment		
Rideshare "Stimulator"	WIN, PS5, XBX/S	Original	Simulation	Unigine Company	Saber Interactive	
Riven Crown	WIN		Soulslike, Action RPG	Intima Leaf		
Untitled Road 96 sequel	Unknown	Original	Adventure	DigixArt	THQ Nordic	
Roco Kingdom (WW)	WIN, PS5, XBX/S, iOS, DROID	Port	Monster tamer, MMO	Morefun Studios	Tencent Games	
Rogue Point	WIN		FPS, Tactical shooter	Crowbar Collective	Team17	
Rollin' Rascal	WIN, LIN, NS, NS2		Platformer	Kiskadee Games, Curiomatic		
RS4	Unknown	Original	MMORPG	Jagex		
Ruiner 2	WIN	Original	Action RPG	Reikon Games		
Runa	WIN		RPG	Fennec Studio		
Rune Factory 6	WIN	Original	RPG, Simulation	Marvelous		
Runesmith	WIN	Original	Tactical RPG	Terahard Studios		
Untitled Runeterra MMO	WIN	Original	MMORPG	Riot Games		
Rusty Winter	WIN		Adventure	Ino Kinwen	Astrolabe Games	
Ryn: And the Thread of Life	WIN	Original	Action-adventure	Innombramble	Top Hat Studios	
Safo and The Moon Warriors	WIN, NS		RPG	Oink Games		
Sakuna Chronicles: Kokorowa and the Gears of Creation	Unknown		Action RPG, Simulation	Edelweiss	JP: Marvelous; NA: Xseed Games; EU: Marvelous Europe	
Sally Face 2	WIN, OSX, LIN, iOS, DROID, consoles	Full release	Adventure, Horror	Portable Moose		
Samurai Gunn 2	WIN, NS, PS5	Full release	Platform fighter	Scrambler	Scrambler, Peow Studio	
Untitled Samurai Shodown game	Unknown		Action RPG	SNK		
SAND: Raiders of Sophie	PS5, XBX/S	Port	Extraction shooter	Hologryph, TowerHaus	tinyBuild	
Sated	WIN	Original	Roguelike, Simulation	Forest Reges	Critical Reflex	
Saturday AM: Battle Manga	WIN		Fighting	Son Studios		
Saw: Genesis	WIN	Early access	Horror	Broken Mirror Games, Anshar Studios	Bloober Team	
Schedule I	WIN	Full release	Simulation	TVGS		
Second Stone	WIN, OSX	Original	Action RPG	Skyward Entertainment	Headup	
Sentimental Graffiti Re	NS, PS5	Remake	Dating sim	Entergram	GungHo Online Entertainment	
Serious Sam: The Third Encounter	WIN	Original	FPS	Croteam	Devolver Digital	
SHE (Seraphim Helix Experiment)	WIN	Original	Survival horror	Rocket Adrift	Weird Ghosts	
ShelfLife: Art School Detective	WIN, NS, PS5, XBX/S	Original	Adventure, Dating sim	Fnife Games		
Shovel Knight: Shovel of Hope DX	WIN, OSX, LIN, NS	Remake	Action-adventure, Platformer	Yacht Club Games		
Untitled Shovel Knight game	Unknown	Original	Platformer	Yacht Club Games		
Shrapnel	WIN	Full release	FPS	Neon Machine		
Signal Veil	WIN, NS2, PS5, XBX/S	Original	Survival horror	Time Hunters	Serafini Productions	
Signet City	WIN	Original	RPG	Jump Over the Age	Fellow Traveller	
Silent Hill	Unknown	Remake	Survival horror	Bloober Team	Konami Digital Entertainment	
Skillshot City	WIN, LIN	Full release	Shooter, Battle royale	Nik Nak Studios		
Sky the Scraper	NS, NS2, PS5	Original	Action-adventure, Roguelike	Ryo Kobuchi	HYPER REAL, Toydium, Chorus Worldwide	
Slay the Spire II	WIN, OSX, LIN	Full release	Deck building (roguelike)	Mega Crit		
Smite 2	WIN, PS5, XBX/S	Full release	MOBA	Titan Forge Games	Hi-Rez Studios	
Solo Leveling: KARMA	WIN, iOS, DROID		Roguelike, Action RPG	Netmarble		
Untitled Sonic the Hedgehog game	Unknown		Unknown	Sonic Team	Sega	
Sonzai	WIN, OSX, LIN, NS, PS4, PS5, XBO, XBX/S		Action RPG	2 Odd Diodes	Top Hat Studios	
Soulframe	WIN		MMO, RPG	Digital Extremes		
Spell Trigger	WIN		TPS	Tosca Orca		
Spellsided	WIN	Original	Puzzle, RPG	Mass Transfer Interactive		
Spooky Tales	WIN	Original	Horror	Liminal Road	Top Hat Studios	
Star Citizen	WIN	Full release	Space trading and combat	Cloud Imperium Games		
Star Wars Battlefront III	Unknown	Original	FPS/TPS	DICE, Respawn Entertainment	Electronic Arts	
Star Wars: Fate of the Old Republic	WIN	Original	Action RPG	Arcanaut Studios, Lucasfilm Games		
Untitled third Star Wars Jedi game	Unknown	Original	Action-adventure	Respawn Entertainment	Electronic Arts	
Star Wars: Knights of the Old Republic — Remake	WIN, PS5	Remake	RPG	Mad Head Games	Saber Interactive	
Untitled Star Wars adventure game	Unknown	Original	Action-adventure	Paramount Games Studio	Lucasfilm Games	
Steins;???	Unknown		Visual novel	Chiyomaru Studio, Mages	Mages	
Steins;Gate: Octet of Shifting Space (WW)	WIN, NS, NS2, PS5	Port	Visual novel, Text adventure	Mages, Nitroplus	Spike Chunsoft	
Stellar Blade: Blood Rain	Unknown	Original	Action-adventure	Shift Up		
Untitled Story of Seasons multiplayer game	Unknown	Original	Farming	Marvelous		
Stranded Deep 2	WIN	Early access	Survival	North Beach Games Prague	North Beach Games	
Streets of Rage: Revolution	Unknown	Original	Brawler	Unknown	Sega	
Streets of Rogue 2	WIN, OSX, LIN	Full release	Roguelike, RPG, Sandbox	Matt Dabrowski	tinyBuild	
Stuntman: Hollywood	WIN, PS5, XBX/S	Original	Action, Racing	Saber Interactive		
Subnautica 2	WIN, XBX/S	Full release	Survival, Action-adventure	Unknown Worlds Entertainment	Unknown Worlds Entertainment, Krafton	
Super Meat Boy Again+	WIN	Remaster	Platformer	Team Meat		
Super Robot Wars Z II: Ruination Remastered	Unknown	Remaster	Tactical RPG	Bandai Namco Forge Digitals	Bandai Namco Entertainment	
Super Yooka-Laylee Kart	WIN	Original	Racing (kart)	Playtonic Games	Playtonic Friends	
Supreme Experiment	WIN		Action-adventure, FPS, Survival	Argunov Games		
Sword and Fairy 4 Remake	WIN	Remake	RPG	UP Software	CubeGame	
Sword Sage: Awakening	WIN	Original	Action RPG	Sword Panda Limited	4Divinity	
Swords of Legends	WIN, PS5, XBX/S	Original	Action RPG	Aurogon Shanghai	Wangyuan Shengtang	
System Shock VR	WIN, PS5, PSVR, Quest	Original	Action-adventure	Flat2VR Studios, Nightdive Studios	Atari, Impat Inked	
Tales of Xillia 2 Remastered	WIN, NS, PS5, XBX/S	Remaster	Action RPG	Dokidoki Grooveworks	Bandai Namco Entertainment	
Tarae: The Unbound	WIN, PS5, XBX/S	Original	Action RPG	Boundary	Krafton	
Tears of Metal	WIN, XBX/S	Full release	Action, Roguelike, Hack and slash	Paper Cult		
Teenage Mutant Ninja Turtles: The Last Ronin	WIN, consoles	Original	Action-adventure	PlatinumGames	Paramount Games Studio	
Tenjutsu	WIN		Action, Roguelike	Deepnight Games	Devolver Digital	
Terminator: Survivors	WIN, PS5, XBX/S	Original	Survival	Nacon Studio Milan	Nacon	
Thank You Bus Driver	WIN, LIN	Original	Simulation	Double Fine		
Thorgal	WIN, PS5, XBX/S		Action-adventure	Mighty Koi		
Tides of Annihilation	WIN, PS5, XBX/S	Original	Action-adventure	Eclipse Glow Games		
Tiebreakers	WIN	Original	Run and gun	Tiecorp Studio		
Time Strike	WIN	Original	FPS	Mode 7		
Time Takers	WIN		TPS, Hero shooter	Mistil Games	NC	
Timespinner 2: Unwoven Dream	WIN, LIN		Metroidvania	Lunar Ray Games		
Tire Boy	WIN		Action-adventure, Platformer	GameTeam6		
To Kill a God	WIN, LIN	Full release	Action, Roguelike	Glitch Factory	Mad Mushroom	
Tokyo Stories	WIN	Original	Adventure	Drecom, CharacterBank	Happinet	
Tom Clancy's Splinter Cell: Remake	Unknown	Remake	Stealth	Ubisoft Toronto	Ubisoft	
Tom Clancy's The Division 3	Unknown	Original	Action RPG, TPS	Massive Entertainment	Ubisoft	
Tom Clancy's The Division Resurgence	iOS, DROID		TPS	Ubisoft		
Total War: Medieval III	WIN	Original	TBS, RTT	Creative Assembly	Sega	
Total War: Warhammer 40,000	WIN, PS5, XBX/S	Original	TBS, RTT	Creative Assembly	Sega	
Troublemaker 3: Fallen Dynasty	WIN	Original	Brawler	Gamecom Team	TBA	
Tsukihime: The Other Side of Red Garden	NS, PS4		Visual novel	Type-Moon	Aniplex	
Twinkle's Galactic Tour	WIN	Original	Platformer	Molegato	Top Hat Studios	
Ugly Within	WIN, NS2, PS5, XSX/S		Survival horror	Yamaitachi	Serafini Productions	
Under a Rock	WIN, PS5, XBX/S	Early access	Survival	Nordic Trolls	Gameforge	
UnderMine 2	WIN	Full release	Action-adventure, Roguelike	Thorium Entertainment		
Underrail 2: Infusion	WIN	Original	RPG	Stygian Software		
Underworld Gang Wars	iOS, DROID	Full release	Battle royale	Mayhem Studios		
Unrecord	WIN		FPS	DRAMA		
Uta no Prince-sama: Dolce Vita	NS		Otome, Visual novel	Broccoli		
Valkyrie Tune: Synthesis of Souls	NS	Port	Visual novel	Frontwing	Good Smile Company	
Vampire: The Masquerade – Eternal Whispers	WIN	Original	RPG	Flyos	Kwalee	
Vampire Survivors — First Survivaton	NS2	Port	Bullet heaven	poncle		
Varsapura	Unknown		RPG	miHoYo		
Volatiles	WIN	Original	Action, Roguelike	Team Instant Defeat	11 Bit Studios	
Wall World 3	WIN	Original	Action, Roguelite, Tower defense	Alawar		
Wane	WIN, OSX, LIN	Original	RPG	Metis Creative	Shoreline Games	
Wardogs	WIN	Full release	FPS	Bulkhead	Team17	
Warhammer 40,000: Chaos Gate – Deathwatch	WIN, PS5, XBX/S	Original	Tactical RPG, TBS	Complex Games	Frontier Foundry	
Warhammer 40,000: Dark Heresy	NS2	Port	RPG	Owlcat Games		
Warhammer 40,000: Space Marine 3	Unknown	Original	TPS, Hack and slash	Saber Interactive	Focus Entertainment	
Wasabi	WIN	Original	Horror (psych)	Phoenix Game Productions		
Waste The Fallen	WIN	Original	Extraction shooter	RoyalCrow		
Waveling Island	WIN, XBX/S	Original	Monster tamer, RPG	BerserkBoy Games		
The Wayward Realms	WIN	Original	Action RPG	OnceLost Games		
We Don't Exist	WIN	Original	Adventure	Versiris		
Westlanders	WIN, PS5, XBX/S	Full release	CMS, Sandbox	The Breach Studios	Team17	
When Sirens Fall Silent	WIN, PS5, XBX/S	Original	Horror	LKA	Wired Productions	
Where Dolls Hang	WIN	Original	Survival horror	Steelkrill Studio		
A Whisper of Fall: Jinyiwei	WIN, PS5	Original	Action RPG	CangMo Game Entertainment		
Whispers in the Fog	WIN	Original	Horror (psych)	Pasquale Scionti	TBA	
Wicked Delights	WIN	Original	Horror, Rhythm	Hiding Spot Games		
Wind Up Deadman	WIN	Original	RPG	SaneNuts Studio	Neowiz	
Windrose	WIN	Full release	Survival	Kraken Express	Pocketpair	
Wishseeker	WIN, OSX	Original	Roguelite, Tactical RPG	MelonCat	Soft Source	
The Witcher Remake	Unknown	Remake	Action RPG	Fool's Theory	CD Projekt Red	
Witherbloom	WIN		Survival, Action RPG, Dungeon crawl	Ever Curious	Nine Dots Publishing	
Wolcen II	WIN, consoles	Full release	Action RPG, Dungeon crawl	Wolcen Studio		
Wolfenstein III	WIN, XBX/S	Original	FPS	MachineGames	Bethesda Softworks	
Untitled WolfEye Studios game	WIN		Action RPG	WolfEye Studios	Neowiz	
Woochi the Wayfarer	WIN, PS5, XBX/S		Action-adventure	LoreVault	Nexon	
Woon	WIN		Brawler	Tour De Pizza		
Work Work Work	WIN	Original	PCA, Puzzle	Mojiken Studio	Toge Productions	
Untitled Worms game	Unknown	Original	TBT	Team17		
Wreckfest 2	WIN, PS5, XBX/S	Full release	Racing	Bugbear Entertainment	THQ Nordic	
Wreckreation 2	WIN, PS5, XBX/S	Original	Racing (arcade)	When Tides Turn		
Untitled Wuchang: Fallen Feathers sequel	Unknown	Original	Soulslike	Indolphinity	505 Games	
Wu-Tang: Rise of the Deceiver	WIN		Action RPG	Brass Lion Entertainment		
Wylde Society	WIN		Life sim, Adventure	Studio Drydock		
Wyrmspan	WIN, OSX	Original	DCCG	Monster Couch	Monster Couch, Stonemaier Games	
Yo-kai Watch 2: Haunted Domain	WIN, NS2, PS5	Remake	RPG	Level-5		

== Unknown status ==
The following list includes games that were announced but have not seen progress updates in years, also known as being in development hell, or have been put on indefinite hold. They may be also deemed as vaporware.

Title	Original announcement	Platform(s)	Type(s)	Genre(s)	Developer(s)	Publisher(s)	Ref.
Untitled Avatar: The Last Airbender role-playing game	October 2024	Unknown	Original	Action RPG	Saber Interactive, Paramount Game Studios		
Beyond Good and Evil 2	June 2017	Unknown	Original	Action-adventure	Ubisoft Montpellier	Ubisoft	
Blade Runner 2033: Labyrinth	June 2023	WIN	Original	Adventure	Annapurna Interactive		
Ciconia When They Cry – Phase 2	October 2019	WIN, OSX	Episode	Visual novel	07th Expansion	JP: 07th Expansion; WW: MangaGamer	
Code: To Jin Yong	June 2022	Unknown	Original	Action	LightSpeed Studios		
Convallaria	March 2019	PS4, PS5	Original	TPS	Loongforce	Sony Interactive Entertainment	
Crysis 4	January 2022	Unknown	Original	FPS	Crytek		
Deep Down	February 2013	PS4	Original	Action RPG	Capcom		
Disaster Report 5	December 2020	Unknown	Original	Action-adventure	Granzella		
Doctor Who: Worlds Apart (Note: While the game wasn't officially cancelled, Reality+ was liquidated in July 2025, PixelPai was shut down in February 2026 and the game itself was delisted from Apple Store in May 2026, leaving its future uncertain.)	August 2020	WIN, MOBI	Full release	DCCG	Reality+, PixelPai		
Fairy Tail: Birth of Magic	August 2024	WIN	Original	Fighting, Action	Pop	Kodansha	
Friday Night Funkin': The Full Ass Game	April 2021	WIN, iOS, DROID	Full release	Rhythm	Funkin' Crew Inc.		
Genshin Impact	January 2020	NS	Port	Action RPG	miHoYo		
Gunfire Reborn	November 2021	NS	Port	Roguelike, FPS	Duoyi Games	505 Games	
In the Valley of Gods (Note: The steam page lists the release date as December 2029, but it's probably a placeholder, as no official statement has been made.)	December 2017	WIN, OSX, LIN	Original	Adventure	Campo Santo		
Instinction	February 2021	WIN, PS4, PS5, XBO, XBX/S	Original	Action-adventure	Hashbane Interactive		
The Last Night	June 2017	WIN, XBO	Original	Platformer	Odd Tales		
Link: The Unleashed Nexus - Restructured Heaven	May 2017	WIN, PS4	Remake	Action	Reminisce		
Mayhem Brawler II: Best of Both Worlds	September 2023	WIN, NS, PS4, PS5, XBO, XBX/S	Original	Brawler	Hero Concept		
Metal Saga: Hangyaku no Rouka	May 2021	NS	Original	RPG	24Frame	Success	
N1RV Ann-A	September 2018	WIN, OSX, LIN, NS, PS4	Original	Visual novel	Sukeban Games		
Outlast 3	December 2017	Unknown	Original	Survival horror	Red Barrels		
Project: The Perceiver	November 2022	PS4, PS5	Original	Action	17ZHE Studio	Papergames	
Radio the Universe	December 2012	WIN	Original	Action RPG	6E6E6E		
Soulvars Fatal Error	May 2022	iOS, DROID	Original	RPG, Deck building	ginolabo		
Star Wars Eclipse	December 2021	Unknown	Original	Action-adventure	Quantic Dream		
SteamWorld: Headhunter	November 2021	Unknown	Original	Action-adventure	Image & Form	Thunderful Games	
Steins;Gate 0 Elite	January 2020	Unknown	Original	Visual novel	Mages		
System Shock 3	March 2017	Unknown	Original	Action RPG	OtherSide Entertainment		
Timelie: Project Steampunk	June 2022	Unknown	Original	Puzzle	Urnique Studio		
Two Worlds III	March 2016	Unknown	Original	Action RPG	TopWare Interactive		
Wyrdsong	August 2022	Unknown	Original	RPG	Something Wicked Games		

== Video game-based film and television releases ==
Title	Release / premiere date	Type	Distributor	Franchise	Original game publisher	Ref.
Elden Ring	March 3, 2028	Live-action feature film	A24	Elden Ring	JP: FromSoftware; WW: Bandai Namco Entertainment	
Untitled Illumination/Nintendo film	April 12, 2028	Computer-animated feature film	Universal Pictures	TBA	Nintendo	
Helldivers	June 9, 2028	Live-action feature film	Sony Pictures Releasing	Helldivers	Sony Interactive Entertainment	
Call of Duty	June 30, 2028	Live-action feature film	Paramount Pictures	Call of Duty	Activision	
Untitled Sonic the Hedgehog spinoff film	December 22, 2028	Live-action feature film	Paramount Pictures	Sonic the Hedgehog	Sega	
Final Fantasy: Black Mages Legacy	2028	Animated television series	TBA	Final Fantasy	Square Enix	
Ghost of Tsushima: Legends	2028	Anime television series	Crunchyroll	Ghost of Tsushima	Sony Interactive Entertainment	
Moshi Monsters	2028	Animated television series	TBA	Moshi Monsters	Mind Candy	
Untitled Cookie Run film	2029	Animated feature film	TBA	Cookie Run	Devsisters	
Untitled The Super Mario Bros. Movie threequel	2029	Computer-animated feature film	Universal Pictures	Mario	Nintendo	

=== In production ===
Title	Type	Distributor	Franchise	Original game publisher	Ref.
99 Nights in the Forest	Live-action feature film	20th Century Studios	99 Nights in the Forest	Grandma's Favourite Games	
Amanda the Adventurer	Live-action feature film	TBA	Amanda the Adventurer	DreadXP	
Assassin's Creed	Live-action television series	Netflix	Assassin's Creed	Ubisoft	
Backyard Sports: The Animated Series	Animated television series	TBA	Backyard Sports	Playground Productions	
Baldur's Gate	Live-action television series	HBO	Baldur's Gate	Black Isle Studios	
Battlefield	Live-action feature film	Sony Pictures Releasing	Battlefield	Electronic Arts	
Beyond: Two Souls	Live-action television series	TBA	Beyond: Two Souls	Sony Interactive Entertainment	
Untitled BioShock film	Live-action feature film	Netflix	BioShock	2K	
Untitled Bloodborne animated film	Adult animated film	Sony Pictures Releasing	Bloodborne	Sony Interactive Entertainment	
Unitled Broken Sword film	Live-action feature film	TBA	Broken Sword	Virgin Interactive	
Clair Obscur: Expedition 33	Live-action feature film	TBA	Clair Obscur: Expedition 33	Kepler Interactive	
Crazy Taxi	Live-action feature film	Netflix	Crazy Taxi	Sega	
Untitled Cyberpunk 2077 live-action film	Live-action feature film	Paramount Pictures	Cyberpunk 2077	CD Projekt	
Death Stranding	Live-action feature film	A24	Death Stranding	Sony Interactive Entertainment	
Death Stranding Mosquito	Anime film	TBA	Death Stranding	Sony Interactive Entertainment	
Diablo	Adult animated television series	Netflix	Diablo	Blizzard Entertainment	
Dredge	Live-action feature film	TBA	Dredge	Team17	
El Paso, Elsewhere	Live-action feature film	TBA	El Paso, Elsewhere	Strange Scaffold	
Far Cry	Live-action television series	FX	Far Cry	Ubisoft	
Five Nights at Freddy's 3	Live-action feature film	Universal Pictures	Five Nights at Freddy's	Scott Cawthon	
Gears of War	Live-action feature film	Netflix	Gears of War	Xbox Game Studios	
Untitled Genshin Impact series	Anime television series	TBA	Genshin Impact	CN: miHoYo; WW: HoYoverse	
Ghost of Tsushima	Live-action feature film	Sony Pictures Releasing	Ghost of Tsushima	Sony Interactive Entertainment	
God of War	Live-action television series	Amazon Prime Video	God of War	Sony Interactive Entertainment	
Grow a Garden	Feature film	TBA	Grow a Garden	Splitting Point Studios, DoBig Studios	
Higurashi When They Cry	Anime television series	Kadokawa Corporation	Higurashi When They Cry	JP: 07th Expansion; WW: MangaGamer	
It Takes Two	Feature film	Amazon MGM Studios	It Takes Two	Electronic Arts	
Just Cause	Live-action feature film	Universal Pictures	Just Cause	Eidos Interactive	
Untitled Kingdom Hearts anime series	Anime television series	Disney+	Kingdom Hearts	Square Enix	
Life Is Strange	Live-action television series	Amazon Prime Video	Life Is Strange	Square Enix	
Lollipop Chainsaw	Anime television series	TBA	Lollipop Chainsaw	JP: Kadokawa Games; WW: Warner Bros. Interactive Entertainment	
Untitled Lollipop Chainsaw live-action film	Live-action feature film	TBA	Lollipop Chainsaw	JP: Kadokawa Games; WW: Warner Bros. Interactive Entertainment	
Mass Effect	Live-action television series	Amazon Prime Video	Mass Effect	Microsoft Game Studios	
Mega Man	Live-action feature film	Netflix	Mega Man	Capcom	
Metal Gear Solid	Live-action feature film	Columbia Pictures	Metal Gear	Konami	
Mortal Kombat III	Live-action feature film	Warner Bros. Pictures	Mortal Kombat	Midway Games	
Mouthwashing	Live-action feature film	Sony Pictures Releasing	Mouthwashing	Critical Reflex	
Overcooked	Reality competition show	Netflix	Overcooked	Team17	
Untitled Persona television series	Live-action television series	Netflix	Persona	JP: Atlus; WW: Sega	
Phasmophobia	Live-action feature film	TBA	Phasmophobia	Kinetic Games	
PUBG	Live-action television series	Netflix	PUBG: Battlegrounds	Krafton	
Riders Republic	Live-action feature film	TBA	Riders Republic	Ubisoft	
Saints Row	Live-action feature film	Plaion	Saints Row	THQ	
Sifu	Live-action feature film	Netflix	Sifu	Sloclap	
The Sims	Live-action feature film	Amazon MGM Studios	The Sims	Electronic Arts	
Sleeping Dogs	Live-action feature film	TBA	Sleeping Dogs	Square Enix	
Slime Rancher	Feature film	TBA	Slime Rancher	Monomi Park	
Untitled Sonic the Hedgehog animated series	Preschool animated series	Netflix	Sonic the Hedgehog	Sega	
Split Fiction	Live-action feature film	Amazon MGM Studios	Split Fiction	Electronic Arts	
Stranger Than Heaven	Live-action feature film	Netflix	Like a Dragon	Sega	
Stray	Animated feature film	Annapurna Animation	Stray	Annapurna Interactive	
Streets of Rage	Live-action feature film	Lionsgate Films	Streets of Rage	Sega	
Tomb Raider	Live-action television series	Amazon Prime Video	Tomb Raider	Eidos Interactive	
Uncharted 2	Live-action feature film	Sony Pictures Releasing	Uncharted	Sony Interactive Entertainment	
Watch Dogs	Live-action feature film	TBA	Watch Dogs	Ubisoft	
Wolfenstein	Live-action television series	Amazon Prime Video	Wolfenstein	Bethesda Softworks	
Wuthering Waves: Elysium	Animated television series	Kuro Onroad	Wuthering Waves	Kuro Games	
