= Afterworld =

Afterworld(s) may refer to:

- Afterworld (web series), a 2007 animated American science fiction series
- "Afterworld" (song), a 2010 song by CKY
- "Afterworld", a 2007 song by Tiger Army from Music from Regions Beyond
- Afterworld, a 2022 album by Blacklist
- Afterworld, a 2016 collectible card game
- Afterworlds, a 2014 novel by Scott Westerfeld
- Afterworld (video game), an upcoming game by Paradox Interactive

== See also ==
- Afterlife (disambiguation)
