= Fate/Extra Record =

Video game remake

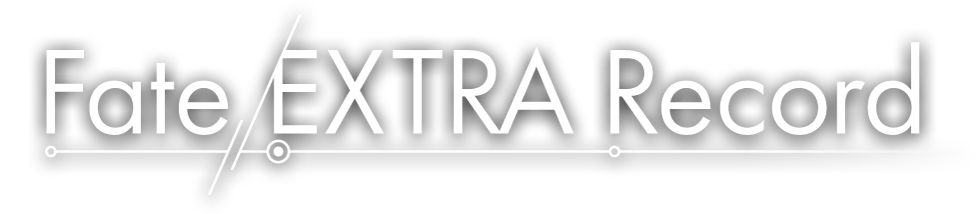
- Developers: Type-Moon Studio BB; Meteorise
- Publisher: Aniplex
- Director: Kazuya Niinō (2020-2026)
- Artists: Arco Wada; Takashi Takeuchi
- Writer: Kinoko Nasu
- Composers: Keita Haga; Yoshimasa Terui
- Series: Fate
- Platforms: Nintendo Switch; Nintendo Switch 2; PlayStation 4; PlayStation 5; Windows
- Release: January 28, 2027
- Genres: Role-playing, dungeon crawler
- Mode: Single-player

Fate/Extra Record (Note: Japanese: フェイト/エクストラレコード, Hepburn: Feito/Ekusutora Rekōdo) (stylized as Fate/EXTRA Record) is an upcoming role-playing dungeon crawling video game developed by Type-Moon Studio BB and Meteorise and published by Aniplex. The game is a remake of the 2010 video game Fate/Extra, and was officially announced in July 2020. The development was initially led by Kazuya Niinō, head of Studio BB and producer on the original game. Arco Wada and Takashi Takeuchi, who served as character designers for the game, had took an active part in development.

The title was scheduled to be released in Q2 2026 but was delayed indefinitely in March 2026, following the exit of original publisher Bandai Namco Entertainment. In August 2026 it was announced that Aniplex would publish the game, Studio BB would undergo reorganization, and Kazuya Niinō had left Type-Moon and stepped down as director.

== Gameplay ==
The game uses the same exploration gameplay featured in Fate/Extra, instead with revamped user interface and new character designs, while excluding the rock paper scissors mechanic for combat. Actions can be selected from a rotating list of commands. Both combatants have their own turns. It also introduces a guard gauge that depletes, depending on the damage of an enemy's initial attack. A fully depleted guard gauges triggers a guard break.

== Plot ==
In Fate/Extra Record, players control amnesiac protagonist Hakuno Kishinami who is inside the virtual world, "SE.RA.PH," and must fight in a weekly Moon Holy Grail War to obtain a wish-granting device and discover their identity.

== Development and release ==
In 2019, Type-Moon hired former Square Enix director Kazuya Niinō—who previously worked as Fate/Extra's producer—to create Japanese video game development studio Type-Moon Studio BB and work on Fate/Extra Record. Studio BB had announced a remake of Fate/Extra for its tenth anniversary in July 2020. It was confirmed that designers Arco Wada and Takashi Takeuchi would return to contribute to the remake. Japanese video game publisher Bandai Namco joined in as the publisher for the game in August 2024, while announcing the game's initial release window for 2025, on the PlayStation 4, PlayStation 5, and Nintendo Switch. However, its release was delayed and would later be pushed to spring 2026. Type-Moon and Namco had came to an agreement of Namco withdrawing from their position as publisher for Fate/Extra Record, leading it to being delayed indefinitely. All the pre-orders for the game were subsequently refunded. Type-Moon had stated that development would continue, but the overall development structure would change.

On August 8, 2026, it was announced that the game would be published by Aniplex going forward and that development would be resuming. It was also revealed that the studio Meteorise would be participating in development and the Nintendo Switch 2 version will also be available. On the same day, Kazuya Niinō announced that he resigned from Type-Moon and stepped down from his role as director due to personal reasons. Niinō also said that he would take a break from game development to focus on his health.
