= Body Cam (disambiguation) =

A body camera is a wearable audio, video, or photographic recording system.

Body Cam or Bodycam may also refer to:

- Body Cam (film), a 2020 horror film
- Bodycam (film), a 2025 horror film
- Bodycam (video game), an upcoming video game
- Police body camera, a wearable audio, video, or photographic recording system used by police
