= The Long Dark =

2017 video game

- Developer: Hinterland Studio
- Publisher: Hinterland Studio
- Director: Raphael van Lierop
- Designers: Raphael van Lierop; Alan Lawrance
- Writer: Raphael van Lierop
- Composers: Cris Velasco; Sascha Dikiciyan
- Engine: Unity
- Platforms: Linux; macOS; Microsoft Windows; Nintendo Switch; PlayStation 4; PlayStation 5; Xbox One; Xbox Series X/S
- Release: Linux, macOS, Windows, PlayStation 4, Xbox One; August 1, 2017; Nintendo Switch; September 17, 2020; Xbox Series X/S; June 19, 2025; PlayStation 5 November 11, 2025
- Genre: Survival
- Mode: Single-player

The Long Dark is a 2017 survival video game developed and published by Hinterland. The player assumes the roles of crash-landed bush pilot Will Mackenzie and medical doctor Astrid Greenwood who must survive the frigid Canadian wilderness after a geomagnetic storm. The game received seed financing from the Canada Media Fund, and further funding was secured through a successful Kickstarter campaign in October 2013.

An alpha version was released through Steam Early Access in September 2014. The alpha version was later launched on the Xbox One as one of the first two launch titles associated with Microsoft's Game Preview Program in June 2015. Early reviews of the alpha release were generally positive, and the game went on to sell around 750,000 copies by April 2016. It was officially released on all aforementioned platforms on August 1, 2017, as well as for PlayStation 4. In 2017, it was announced that a film adaptation of The Long Dark was in the works. A Nintendo Switch port was announced and released on September 17, 2020.

On December 12, 2024, a sequel titled Blackfrost: The Long Dark 2 was announced.

== Gameplay ==
In-game screenshot showing minimalist HUD elements which inform the player of important information about their current state of health

The Long Dark is a survival game which takes place in the frigid Canadian wilderness, and is played from a first-person perspective. The player must manage their body temperature, calorie levels, hunger, weight, and fatigue. The Long Dark has three game modes available to the player: story, survival, and challenge.

The game's map is divided up into 12 main regions: Mystery Lake, Coastal Highway, Pleasant Valley, Forlorn Muskeg, Desolation Point, Timberwolf Mountain, Mountain Town, Broken Railroad, Hushed River Valley, Bleak Inlet, Ash Canyon, and Blackrock Mountain. Alongside these are transition regions, which are significantly smaller and whose purpose is to connect these regions together through a small region. They are: Crumbling Highway, Keeper's Pass North, Keeper's Pass South, Ravine, and Winding River. The Tales from the Far Territory DLC added four regions: Transfer Pass, Forsaken Airfield, Zone of Contamination, and Sundered Pass, and a smaller connecting region being the Far Range Branch Line.

=== Survival mode ===
Survival mode is set in an open world environment where the only objective is for the player to survive as long as possible, with permadeath as the only ending until the Tales from the Far Territory DLC added Cheat Death. Cheat Death is an optional mechanic where players can, up to 3 times per save, resurrect their character at the cost of increased game difficulty, although in misery mode, permadeath is the only option. To survive, the player must manage their body temperature, calorie, hunger, and fatigue levels; avoid dangerous wildlife; and manage illness and injury (such as frostbite or broken ribs). Fire is used for warmth and cooking. The game simulates a full day/night cycle, where night is significantly colder.

Survival has five game difficulty levels modes: pilgrim, voyageur, stalker, interloper, and misery, as well as customizable difficulty levels. Difficulty levels affect resources that can be found, as well as wildlife and weather.

=== Story mode (Wintermute) ===
Story mode (also known as Wintermute) is an episodic adventure game with survival elements, and does not have a permadeath feature. In Wintermute, the narrative alternates between Will Mackenzie and Dr. Astrid Greenwood as they try and find each other after crash-landing in the Canadian wilderness following a geomagnetic storm. The player faces survival difficulties as in other play modes, but is restricted to certain geographic regions in each episode.

Story mode was initially planned to be released late 2014, but was pushed back to late 2016. Development was pushed back again and the game was ultimately released on August 1, 2017, with the first two episodes of the five-part story released together. The episodes are:

- Episode 1: Do Not Go Gentle
- Episode 2: Luminance Fugue
- Episode 3: Crossroads Elegy was released October 22, 2019.
- Episode 4: Fury, Then Silence was released October 6, 2021.
- Episode 5: The Light at the End of All Things was released on March 30, 2026.

Due to complaints by players, a new version of Episodes 1 and 2 was released in December 2018, with many changes made to the gameplay, presentation, and mission structure.

== Development ==
=== Planning ===
Following completion of his work as director on Warhammer 40,000: Space Marine, Raphael van Lierop left Relic Entertainment to work on projects which he felt were "more personal" and "more representative of [his] values". Van Lierop also left Vancouver, moving his family from the city to the Comox Valley in the northern part of Vancouver Island. Inspired by these new surroundings, he formed Hinterland and began to work on The Long Dark, a game about surviving the Canadian wilderness. Hinterland wanted to explore a post-apocalyptic world from the fringes, away from the urban apocalypse, which "we've all seen a million times" and away from "B-movie cliches like zombies". Van Lierop was also keen to impart a Canadian identity upon the game, having been frustrated with homogenised AAA video games which sacrificed character for mass market appeal. He summed up his approach with, "I'm Canadian. This game is Canadian. Deal with it."

When van Lierop announced the Hinterland team in September 2013, members included Alan Lawrance, formerly a lead at Volition, Marianne Krawczyk, writer of the God of War series, and David Chan, BioWare's first audio designer. A year later, they were joined by Ken Rolston, the lead designer of The Elder Scrolls III: Morrowind. Hinterland operated as a virtual team, with its members remote workers. Lawrance cites remote work as a crucial factor in his decision to join Hinterland.

=== Funding and alpha release ===
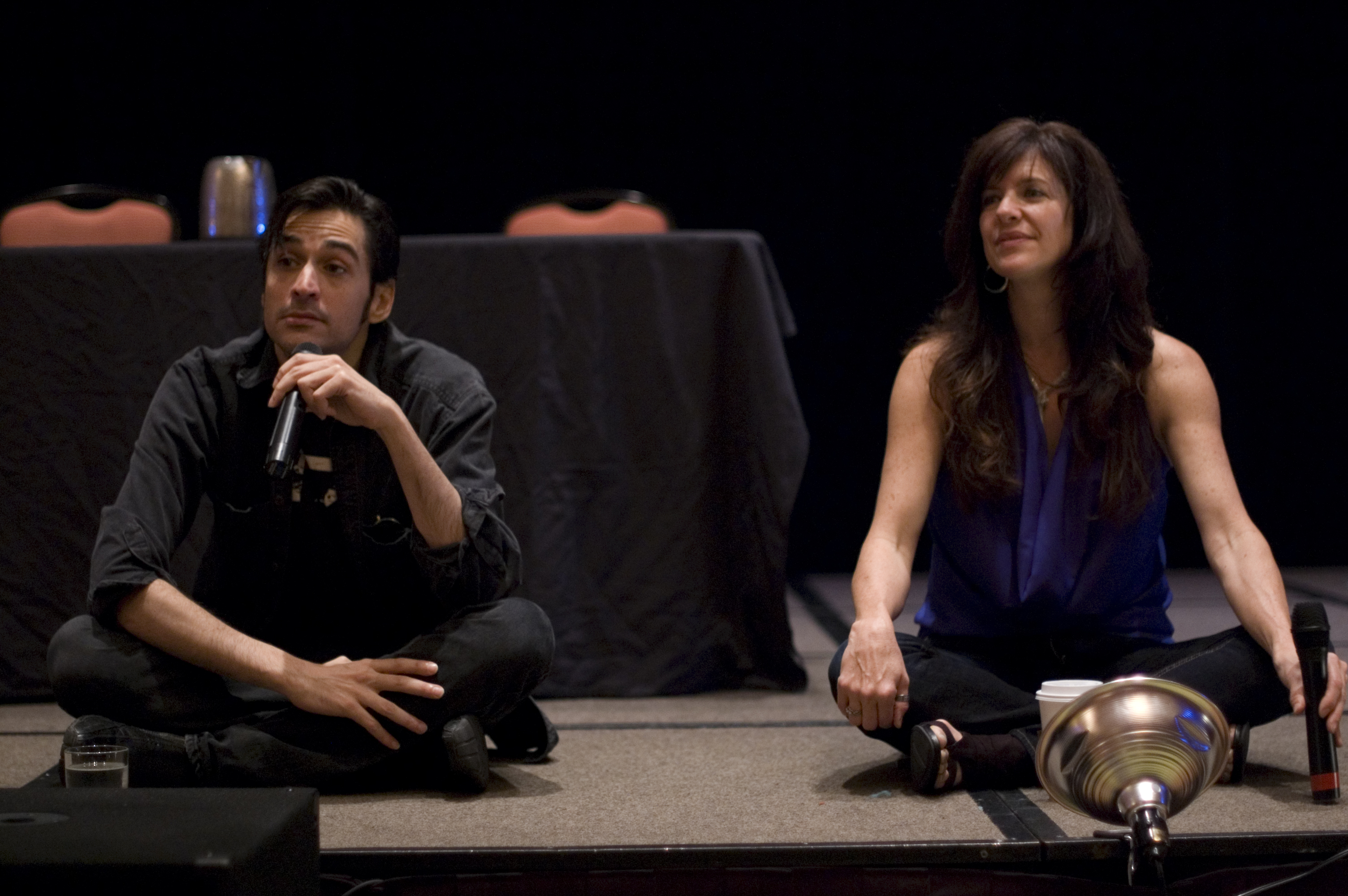
Voice actors Mark Meer and Jennifer Hale were among the voice cast announced during the game's Kickstarter campaign.

Hinterland obtained seed funding from the Canada Media Fund, and in September 2013, launched a Kickstarter campaign for The Long Dark to raise C$200,000 and build a community around the game. The campaign was successful, raising C$256,617 upon its completion in October 2013. PayPal contributions following the Kickstarter campaign pushed the final total to over C$275,000 by March 2014. Hinterland announced the game's voice cast during the Kickstarter campaign, allowing The Long Dark to capitalise on the actors' individual fan bases; the cast announced were Mark Meer, Elias Toufexis, Jennifer Hale and David Hayter. An alpha version was released through Steam Early Access in September 2014. Hinterland were mindful of the game's scope, not wanting to expand the team's size and increase risk, and so limited their Kickstarter stretch goals (bonus incentives that are added when a funding goal is reached) to those that added quality, rather than those that added in-game content. Van Lierop spoke of their studio's approach to early access at the 2015 Game Developers Conference where he warned against allowing the player community to dictate the game's direction, with Hinterland deciding to stick to their original vision.

=== Full release ===
In April 2016, Van Lierop posted an update about the story mode release, explaining that Hinterland had elected to delay the launch of story mode until it contained four to six hours of initial gameplay instead of the originally planned two hours. He also declined to set a release date, saying, "You won't get another promise from me about when it will ship, until we are close enough to being done with it that I can say with 100% certainty, and give you a definitive date that I know isn't going to end up with us pushing out an experience we aren't 100% satisfied with". He pointed to the evolution of sandbox mode as another reason for delay, saying that its popularity had grown to the point that Hinterland decided to bring back regular updates for it, even though it was originally conceived merely as a test-bed for the story mode. His post also provided a developmental road-map with short-term, medium-term, and long-term goals for additions and improvements. In May 2017, Hinterland announced the full release of The Long Dark with a well-received trailer, set to Agnes Obel's song "The Curse."

In February 2020, the developers asked Nvidia to remove The Long Dark from GeForce Now, a cloud streaming service, shortly after the service exited beta and went "live." The developers said that their game was improperly placed on the service without any sort of licensing agreement; Nvidia agreed to remove the game. The game returned to GeForce Now in May 2020 after Nvidia announced they would switch to an opt-in policy for including games on their platform.

=== Expansions ===
In October 2022, Hinterland announced the development of their first paid content expansion named Tales from the Far Territory, where players could gain access to redesigned gameplay systems, new regions, and new Tales - challenges that would encourage the player to explore the new regions added by the expansion. Additionally, Hinterland released free content along with each update of the paid expansion. On December 5, 2022, Tales from the Far Territory officially released. The first update, called "Forsaken Airfield," added three new maps: Forsaken Airfield, Far Range Branch Line, and Transfer Pass.

The second part to the expansion pass, "Signal Void," was released on March 31, 2023. This update added the first Tale, also called Signal Void. The third expansion, named "Frontier Comforts," was released on June 21, 2023. This expansion did not come with a new map, but introduced a host of new cooking and crafting recipes. The fourth expansion and second Tale were both named "Buried Echoes." Released on the 5th of December, 2023, this update added a new region, the Zone of Contamination, and related gameplay changes, such as toxic zones and poisoned wolves. The fifth expansion and third Tale, both named "Last Horizon," were released on June 24th, 2024. This update added a new map, Sundered Pass, and a new major predator, the cougar. The cougar was removed three days later, on the 27th of June, 2024, due to poor player reception. The sixth and final installment of the expansion, known as "Broken Silence," was released on December 2nd, 2024. This final update added the fourth and final Tale, "Sutherland's Tale," and was accompanied by a slew of new gameplay mechanics, tools, and clothing recipes.

== Reception ==
Reception

Aggregate score
Aggregator	Score
Metacritic	PC: 77/100; PS4: 75/100; XONE: 76/100; NS: 76/100

=== Early access ===
Following a period of alpha access exclusive to backers of the crowdfunding campaign, a version of the game featuring only its sandbox-style survival mode was released on Steam Early Access in September 2014 for Windows. It later arrived on Linux in November 2015. Early impressions from critics were generally favorable, but noted the incomplete nature of the game.

Leif Johnson, writing for PC Gamer in June 2014, felt that the game's small, unchanging map rewarded route memorisation, and the game was most engaging when allowing the player to discover things for themselves. Andy Kelly, writing for the same publication a month later, praised the atmosphere, highlighting the art style, sound design, and lighting. Kelly felt that the game's "focus on atmosphere and environmental survival" made it "[stand] out in an increasingly crowded genre."

At GameSpot, Shaun McInnis had similar thoughts, saying that while the survival genre was becoming more crowded, The Long Dark was "one of the few games in this genre focused on capturing the solitary wonder of fighting to staying alive in the brutal wilderness." John Walker, writing for Rock, Paper, Shotgun in August 2014, enjoyed the game and found it "impressively full of things to do," but felt that the accelerated passage of time detracted from the realism. In an early access review for GameSpot, Nick Capozzoli also criticised unrealistic elements, noting that one should not need "a dozen energy bars and a pound of venison to sustain yourself day-to-day" and that "a crowbar [shouldn't] lose half its integrity after being used to pry open a couple lockers." Instead of stretching his resources as a survivalist would, he felt "like an insatiable force that roves through the environment, picking it clean." Like Johnson, he criticized the limited area given to explore. With an update later that October, Hinterland doubled the size of the playable area, and expanded it again in February 2015 to bring the size of the game world to 25 km^{2}.

Wired writer Matt Peckham labelled The Long Dark a "troubling yet beautiful gem," and joined IGN columnist Lucy O'Brien in recognizing the game's beautiful artistic vision, with O'Brien noting that "developer Hinterland has gone to great lengths to make the world itself a beautiful place to explore."

=== Commercial reception ===
By January 2015, the game had sold 250,000 copies and by August 2015, 500,000 copies had been sold. In April 2016, Hinterland announced that over 750,000 copies had been sold across all platforms and expressed gratitude over the 99.78% approval rating from the Steam user-base. As of September 2019, 3.3 million copies have been sold. Sales reached 5 million copies by 2021.

=== Accolades ===
At the 2018 Webby Awards, the game was nominated for "Best Art Direction," "Best Game Design," and "Best Music/Sound Design," and won the awards for "Best Writing" and "Strategy/Simulation."
