= Graven (video game) =

2024 video game

- Developer: Slipgate Ironworks
- Publishers: 3D Realms; Fulqrum Publishing
- Directors: David Queener; Frederik Schreiber
- Producers: David Queener; Frederik Schreiber; Gustav Schrøder; Kim Ørbæk Juul
- Writer: David Queener
- Composer: Nikola Nikita
- Engine: Unreal Engine 4
- Platforms: Windows; PlayStation 4 PlayStation 5 Xbox One; Xbox Series X/S
- Release: Windows; January 23, 2024; PS4, PS5, Xbox Series X/S; June 25, 2024
- Genre: First-person shooter
- Modes: Single-player, multiplayer

Graven is a 2024 first-person shooter game developed by Slipgate Ironworks and published by 3D Realms and Fulqrum Publishing. Graven incorporates elements of the action role-playing game and immersive sim genres to create an "action-adventure puzzler".

== Gameplay ==
Graven is an open-ended journey through three expansive regions, where the player will encounter both dangerous enemies and friendly townsfolk. Various hints, quests, and upgrades are obtained from the world's non-player characters. The player can find a wide variety of weapons and spells, each of which must be put to novel use in order to progress. While some spells may be used offensively, most of the combat involves using medieval weapons against eldritch monsters.

The game supports solo play, split-screen co-op, and up to 4-player online play.

== Plot ==
Players assume the role of a faithful priest of the Orthogonal order, exiled for a crime of retaliation against the order for sacrificing his adoptive daughter. The game begins with the priest adrift in a swamp, ferried by a stranger to solid ground. He bestows vague instructions, along with a mysterious staff and book. The priest embarks to hunt down the foul heretical sects responsible for conjuring plagues and twisting the natural order of the seasons.

== Release ==
Graven was announced by 3D Realms and Slipgate Ironworks at the Realms Deep 2020 event on September 6. The announcement included a 30-minute gameplay reveal. The game was released on Windows via early access on May 26, 2021. The game was released in full for Windows on January 23, 2024, with versions for PlayStation 4, PlayStation 5, Xbox One, and Xbox Series X/S was released the same year on June 25.

== Reception ==
Reception

Aggregate scores
Aggregator	Score
Metacritic	65/100 (PC)
OpenCritic	21% recommend

Review score
Publication	Score
Shacknews	5/10

Graven received "mixed or average" reviews for the PC version, according to review aggregator website Metacritic. Fellow review aggregator OpenCritic assessed that the game received weak approval, being recommended by only 21% of critics. PC Gamer described the game as a spiritual successor to Hexen II.
