= Frogun Encore =

2024 video game

- Developer: Molegato
- Publisher: Top Hat Studio
- Platforms: Microsoft Windows; Xbox Series X/S; Xbox One; PlayStation 4 PlayStation 5 Nintendo Switch
- Release: June 25, 2024
- Genre: Platform
- Modes: Single-player, multiplayer

Frogun Encore is a 2024 3D platform video game developed by Molegato and published by Top Hat Studios. It is a sequel to 2022's Frogun. In the game, players control Renata and her friend Jake as they work to thwart the evil Fly Bois. It was released for consoles on June 25, 2024.

== Gameplay ==
Frogun Encore features local co-op multiplayer gameplay, a new addition since the first game. The game's levels are designed tightly and fast-paced, typically completed in less than ten minutes.

The game's moveset was expanded to place a greater focus on agility. Players can use ziplines, twirl and double jump, and launch themselves skywards. When playing in co-op, players can bounce off each other's heads.

== Development ==
Development of the game was handled by the Spanish one-man studio Molegato. Prior to developing Frogun Encore and Frogun, Molegato was known for releasing the twin-stick shooter Demented Pixie and racing game Supersonic Tank Cats.

Encore was inspired by retro 3D platformers on the Nintendo 64 and original PlayStation.

== Reception ==
Reception

Aggregate score
Aggregator	Score
OpenCritic	29% recommend

Review score
Publication	Score
Nintendo Life	8/10

29% of critics recommended the game according to OpenCritic.

In a positive review from Nintendo Life, the game was praised for its co-op, replayability, and fixes to its camera when compare to its predecessor. They noted that the game's physics had issues. In a mixed review, Gaming Age called it a "serviceable" title, but one that is hard to recommend.
