= Hinterland Studio =

Canadian video game developer

Hinterland Studio Inc.
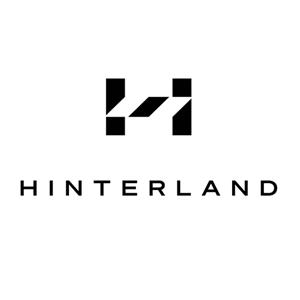
- Trade name: Hinterland
- Type: Private
- Industry: Video games
- Founded: 2012; 14 years ago
- Founder: Raphael van Lierop
- Headquarters: Vancouver, British Columbia, Canada
- Key people: Raphael van Lierop (founder, CEO and chief creative officer)
- Products: The Long Dark; Blackfrost: The Long Dark 2
- Website: www.hinterland.com

Hinterland Studio Inc., trading as Hinterland, is a Canadian independent video game developer and publisher headquartered in Vancouver, British Columbia. The company was founded in 2012 by Raphael van Lierop and is best known for developing and publishing the survival video game The Long Dark. Hinterland is developing the game's sequel, Blackfrost: The Long Dark 2. Van Lierop serves as the company's chief executive officer and chief creative officer.

== History ==
Raphael van Lierop established Hinterland in 2012 after previously working at Relic Entertainment and Ubisoft Montreal. The studio was publicly announced in September 2013, with its original team based on Vancouver Island and working remotely. Its founding members included technical director Alan Lawrance, audio director David Chan, art director Hokyo Lim and writer Marianne Krawczyk, who had previously worked for studios including Volition, BioWare and Riot Games.

Hinterland's first project was The Long Dark, a first-person survival game set after a geomagnetic disaster. Van Lierop described the project as an attempt to create a more grounded post-disaster game centred on environmental hazards rather than zombies. The project received initial support from the Canada Media Fund, after which Hinterland launched a Kickstarter campaign in September 2013.

The Long Dark entered early access through Steam in September 2014. The early-access release initially consisted of its open-ended survival mode, while an episodic story mode was planned for the completed version. The game left early access on 1 August 2017, when Hinterland released its full version alongside the first two episodes of the five-part story mode, Wintermute.

In 2021, Hinterland announced plans to separate the story and survival components of The Long Dark internally and to introduce paid updates for its survival mode. In April 2022, the company announced its first paid expansion and transferred day-to-day leadership of The Long Dark to Katie Sorrell, while van Lierop remained the studio's creative director. The expansion, Tales from the Far Territory, began its six-part release in December 2022.

Hinterland announced Blackfrost: The Long Dark 2 at The Game Awards 2024. The company initially planned to release the game in early access during 2026, with both single-player and cooperative multiplayer modes. In February 2026, Hinterland said that the early-access release had been delayed beyond the end of 2026. The company laid off 10 full-time employees and announced that it would not renew the fixed-term contracts of four other workers, citing the need to preserve its financial resources while development continued.

The fifth and final episode of The Long Dark's Wintermute story mode, titled The Light at the End of All Things, was released on 31 March 2026.

== Games ==
Title	Type	First release or announcement	Status
The Long Dark	Survival video game	2014	Released
The Long Dark: Tales from the Far Territory	Expansion	2022	Released
Blackfrost: The Long Dark 2	Survival video game	2024	In development
The Long Dark: Iron Road	Expansion	2026	Early Access
