= Peripeteia (video game) =

Upcoming video game

- Peripeteia box-art on Steam
- Developer: Ninth Exodus
- Publisher: Ninth Exodus
- Programmers: Shodanon; Baller's Gait; Snake (formerly)
- Writer: Snake (formerly)
- Composers: Ed Harrison (aka 0edit); Bogie; Daungreid; Cynthoni (fka Sewerslvt; featured)
- Engine: Unity
- Platform: Microsoft Windows
- Release: Early access; 21 February 2025
- Genres: Action role-playing, immersive sim, first-person shooter, stealth
- Mode: Single-player

Peripeteia is an upcoming indie immersive sim developed by independent, Polish game studio, Ninth Exodus. The player controls Marie, a superhuman cyborg with amnesia, looking for a secret bunker in a post-Soviet cyberpunk Poland. It was released into Steam Early Access on 21 February 2025.

== Gameplay ==
As an immersive sim, levels in Peripeteia can be completed several different ways depending on the actions of the player. Non-player characters give the player missions in exchange for information or items, which ultimately further the main goal of reaching a secret bunker outside of the city.

Gameplay mechanics include:

- A free-form grid inventory system, allowing players to place items in their inventory in a number of orientations and positions.
- Cybernetic implants which can be activated at will using the function keys.
- Semi-realistic firearm reloading, requiring manual replenishing of empty weapons in the inventory.
- A timed hacking minigame, which requires players to guess a password using a heat map-style keyboard display.
- Climbing and physics mechanics.
- Light/sound stealth mechanics.

== Plot ==
In the mid-late 20th century, the Cold War escalated into a third world war that ended in a nuclear holocaust, devastating the entire planet. Despite nearly every major population center in the world being hit by nuclear bombs, a large portion of Poland, including Warsaw, was left relatively untouched. The destruction of the former world powers (namely NATO and the Soviet Union) left a large power vacuum in Europe, which would be promptly be filled by the newly formed "Polish Solidarity Republic" (PSR), which rose from the ashes of the Polish People's Republic and the Polish Catholic Church.

In the wake of the nuclear war, a large expanse of Eastern Europe, dubbed the "International Disputed Zone" (IDZ), was claimed by all three of the surviving nations of the war; the PSR to the north, NATO to the west, and the "Second Union" (an attempted rebirth of the Soviet Union) to the east. The PSR was able to easily claim and occupy large regions of the IDZ, though true control over these regions is doubted by many, as groups of both Second Unionist separatists and the followers of a counter-culture movement dubbed the "Joy Cult" threaten the temporary stability.

All the while, cybernetic implants, originally developed as prosthetics for soldiers, had become extremely popular, as several world armies began to shift towards cybernetic bio-computer warfare. Moments before being dismantled for parts by a black-market scrapper, Marie, a cybernetic super-soldier wakes up in a trash heap. She doesn't remember who she is or how she ended up there, but she quickly manages to get the hang of her implants, of which includes a spy drone, enhanced movement, and night vision.

The rest of Peripeteia's plot follows Marie, as she navigates through the world on a journey to a location from her only other remaining memory: an elusive Soviet bunker, filled with strange and futuristic technology.

== Development ==
While the staff of Ninth Exodus does a majority of the development for the game, Peripeteia has had major contributions from other members of the indie developer community. One example of this is the game's dialogue font, White Rabbit (by Matthew Welch), which was given a Slavic language overhaul by several members of the community, allowing it to properly display Polish and Cyrillic characters.

=== Early development ===
Peripeteia began as a game jam project in November 2019. The founders of Ninth Exodus reached out to other developers in their circles to refine it. The "Unveiled" demo was released on 29 November 2020, containing a significantly polished first level and new characters.

=== Crowdfunding ===
On 14 August, 2021, a Kickstarter fundraiser was created to help fund Peripeteia with an initial goal of €10,000. Three days later, on 17 August, the initial goal was reached and new stretch goals were unveiled. Over the next month, more than €37,000 was pledged by the community, reaching all ten of the stretch goals. On 18 August, a revised version of the Peripeteia demo was released on Steam.

=== Early-access ===
On 21 February 2025, Peripeteia was released into early access on Steam by Ninth Exodus, featuring 8 levels.

== Reception ==
PC Gamer's Joshua Wolens said that Peripeteia "feels a little like the beautiful mutant hybrid of Stalker and Deus Ex," owing to its immersive sim roots. PCGamesN's Oisin Kuhnke said "it also feels like the original Thief, especially given its themes of authoritarian government, and levels built around verticality."

Eurogamer's Lewis Gordan, while criticizing Peripeteia for its bugs and poor enemy AI, praised that "the moments this game conjures as you navigate the various strata of its crumbling, vertiginous megacity, stumbling across sights capable of filling you simultaneously with dread and awe are superbly powerful."

In February 2025, RPGFan's Ben Love elaborated on the lacking AI in Peripeteia, stating that enemies often "become invulnerable, fall through the floor, or otherwise exhibit strange errors that break immersion and ruin a carefully planned attempt at stealth." Love warned that potential players "may feel this diamond in the rough requires a bit more polish and may want to wait until the game is closer to full release to jump in."

=== Accolades ===
Year	Award	Category	Result	Ref.
2022	IndieDB	Players Choice - Best Upcoming Indie	Won	
2025	IndieDB	Players Choice - Indie of the Year	Won	
