= Never Grave: The Witch and The Curse =

- Developer: Frontside 180
- Publisher: Pocketpair
- Composer: Loremelia
- Platforms: Nintendo Switch; PlayStation 4; PlayStation 5; Windows; Xbox Series X/S
- Release: March 5, 2026
- Genres: Roguelike, metroidvania
- Modes: Single-player, multiplayer

Never Grave: The Witch and the Curse (Note: Japanese: ネバーグレイブ: ザ ウィッチ アンド ザ カース) is a Roguelike metroidvania game developed by Frontside 180 and published by Pocketpair. It was released on March 5, 2026.

== Gameplay ==
Never Grave is a 2d action game with elements of Roguelikes and Metroidvania. The gameplay involves controlling a witch exploring though procedurally generated areas. Along with fighting, the witch can possess enemies with her hat.

== Release ==
Never Grave: The Witch and The Curse was first revealed as a game developed by Pocketpair's internal studio Frontside 180 in 2023. While Pocketpair originally considered releasing the game in early access, they instead decided to release the full game by 2026.

== Reception ==
Reception

Aggregate scores
Aggregator	Score
Metacritic	(PC) 72/100
OpenCritic	50% recommend

The PC version of Never Grave: The Witch and The Curse received "mixed or average" reviews from critics, according to the review aggregation website Metacritic. Fellow review aggregator OpenCritic assessed that the game received fair approval, being recommended by 50% of critics.
