= La Quimera =

- Developer: Reburn
- Engine: Unreal Engine 4
- Platform: Windows
- Release: May 7, 2025 (early access)
- Genre: First-person shooter
- Mode: Single-player

La Quimera is a first-person shooter developed by Reburn (a separate division of 4A Games Ukraine). The game was to be released on April 25, 2025 but was delayed to May 7, 2025 on early access.

== Gameplay ==
La Quimera is a narrative-driven first-person shooter with optional co-op gameplay where strategic teamwork, combat abilities, and resource sharing will be necessary to overcome challenges. The exoskeleton is customizable to suit different playstyles and enemy encounters. Enemies are diverse and scattered as distinct enemy factions, from aggressive raiders to heavily armored elites. The player has a personal AI assistant for strategic guidance and support in combat and exploration.

== Development ==
Reburn, formerly known as 4A Games Ukraine, announced La Quimera in February 2025. The game's story was co-created by filmmaker Nicolas Winding Refn, known for Drive. It was revealed that Reburn and 4A Games Malta have been separate companies since 2014, despite co-developing Metro Exodus. 4A Malta, now owned by Embracer Group, retains the 4A name and trademark while Reburn is forging its own path. The game uses a modified Unreal Engine 4 and lasts around 5 hours.

Reception

Aggregate scores
Aggregator	Score
Metacritic	(PC) 44/100
OpenCritic	43%

Review score
Publication	Score
IGN	4/10

== Plot ==
The game is set in the year 2064 where traditional nation-states have all but vanished, replaced by fragmented microstates struggling to survive in a world reshaped by decades of disaster. A cascade of natural and man-made catastrophes in the 2030s and 2040s shattered global stability, dismantling governments and severing long-standing systems of power with small political entities and powerful corporations taking control. The players control PMC operatives in this setting in an unspecified region of Latin America.
