= Pocketpair =

Japanese video game development company

Pocketpair, Inc.
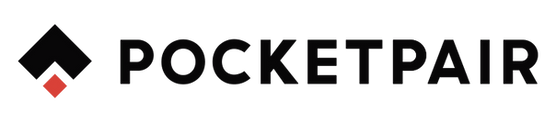
- Logo used since 2024

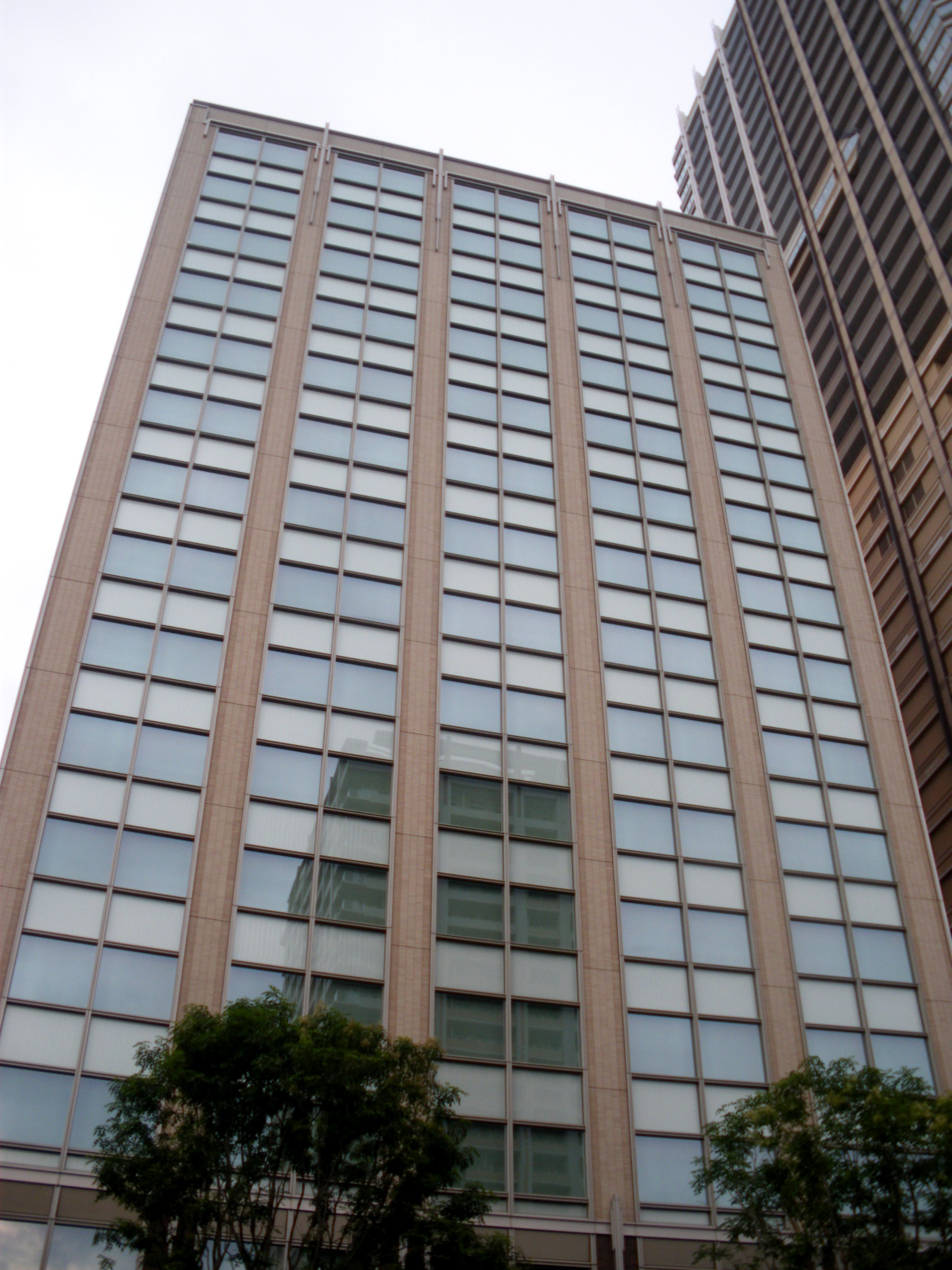
- Higashigotanda Square, where the company's headquarters is located
- Native name: 株式会社ポケットペア
- Romanized name: Kabushikigaisha Pokettopea
- Type: Private
- Industry: Video games
- Founded: April 2015; 11 years ago
- Founder: Takuro Mizobe
- Headquarters: 2-10-2 Higashigotanda Square Building, Higashigotanda, Shinagawa-ku, Tokyo, Japan
- Area served: Worldwide
- Key people: Takuro Mizobe (CEO); Riichi Sato (Director)
- Products: Overdungeon; Craftopia; AI Art Impostor; Palworld; Never Grave: The Witch and The Curse
- Website: pocketpair.jp

Pocketpair, Inc. (Note: The company is officially written as "Pocketpair", but it is also referred as "Pocket Pair" in media and other sources.) (Note: Formerly known as PocketPair.inc) (株式会社ポケットペア, Kabushikigaisha Pokettopea) is a Japanese video game development company based in Shinagawa, Tokyo. The company was founded by Takuro Mizobe in 2015 and is best known for their games Craftopia and Palworld.

The company's first title was the roguelike deck-building game Overdungeon which was released in 2019. In 2020, Pocketpair released the open-world survival crafting game Craftopia and announced Palworld in 2021. However, the game's development was delayed, and they released their third title AI Art Impostor in 2022. In 2026, they released Palworld after five years of development.

== History ==
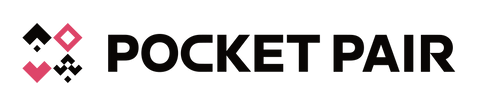
Logo used from 2015 to 2024

Pocketpair was founded in 2015 by Takuro Mizobe. Mizobe completed an internship at Nintendo Game Seminar while he was studying at the Tokyo Institute of Technology. After his graduation from university, he joined JPMorgan Chase but soon resigned to found the bitcoin exchange Coincheck. Half of Pocketpair's initial development team were friends that Mizobe met at the Nintendo Game Seminar and the other half were friends from university.

In 2019, Pocketpair released the card-action game Overdungeon. The game was developed based on the idea of combining the elements of Slay the Spire and Clash Royale. Pocketpair initially launched the game in early access in November 2018 and it was officially released by Chinese publisher Lightning Games in 2019. However, due to issues related to the contract with the publisher, Pocketpair was unable to proceed with updates for the game. As a result, they decided to abandon updates for Overdungeon and instead they started developing their second game, Craftopia. Eventually, Pocketpair regained full rights to Overdungeon and resumed its development after a period of inactivity. On January 9, 2025, the game was released for the Nintendo Switch, marking its return with the first update in four years, which introduced new content and various improvements.

Based on their experience with the development of Overdungeon, which was developed with the idea of combining the elements of multiple games. Pocketpair developed Craftopia based on the idea of incorporating elements from even more games. As a result, the development of Craftopia drew inspiration from various games such as The Legend of Zelda: Breath of the Wild, Minecraft and ARK: Survival Evolved. In September 2020, Pocketpair launched the early access of this game.

Pocketpair began development on Palworld six months after the early access release of Craftopia. The company significantly expanded its staff for the development of Palworld. The game was announced in June 2021 at INDIE Live Expo. Initially, the plan was to complete the game within about a year of its announcement, but due to delays in development, the game was postponed. During that time, in November 2022, Pocketpair released AI Art Impostor for Windows, Android and iOS. Additionally, in May 2023, the company announced Never Grave: The Witch and The Curse, a 2D action game developed by their in-house studio, Frontside 180 Studio. Despite aiming to complete Palworld's development by August 2023, it was delayed again. After a network test conducted in November 2023, early access of the game finally began in January 2024 for Windows, Xbox One, and Xbox Series X/S, and for the PlayStation 5 in September 2024. On June 10, 2024, it was announced that the game would be released in early access for macOS later that year.

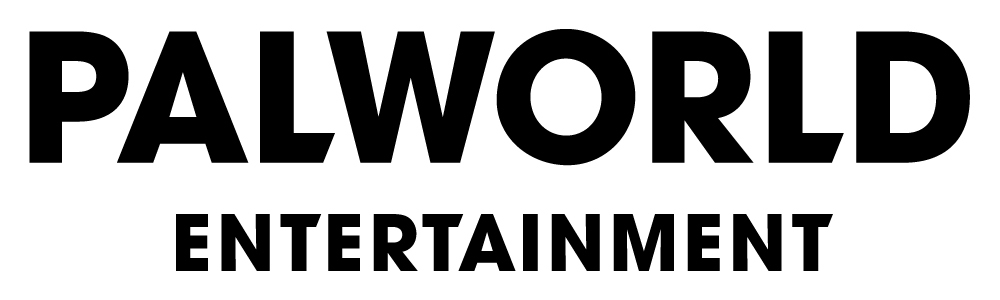
Palworld Entertainment, Inc. logo

In July 2024, Pocketpair announced a partnership with Sony Music Entertainment Japan and its subsidiary Aniplex to establish Palworld Entertainment, Inc. The joint venture was created to expand Palworld's brand through licensing and merchandising while excluding the game's development and distribution. The initiative aims to develop official merchandise and collaborations, with the first products showcased at Bilibili World 2024 in Shanghai, China.

On September 19, 2024, Nintendo and The Pokémon Company filed a lawsuit against Pocketpair in the Tokyo District Court, alleging that Palworld infringed on multiple patents. The claims centered on mechanics related to capturing creatures using throwable devices, determining whether a thrown object initiates combat or captures a creature, and the ability to ride creatures within the game. The lawsuit sought an injunction to halt Palworld's distribution and demanded damages of 10 million yen (approximately $65,000), plus additional fees. Pocketpair responded by expressing disappointment over the lawsuit and stated its intent to defend its position in court.

In October 2024, Pocketpair partnered with South Korean publisher Krafton to bring their game, Palworld, to mobile platforms. Krafton's subsidiary, PUBG Studios, is tasked with adapting Palworld for mobile devices, aiming to faithfully reinterpret the core elements of the original game for the mobile environment. This collaboration signifies Pocketpair's strategic move to expand Palworld's reach into the mobile gaming market.

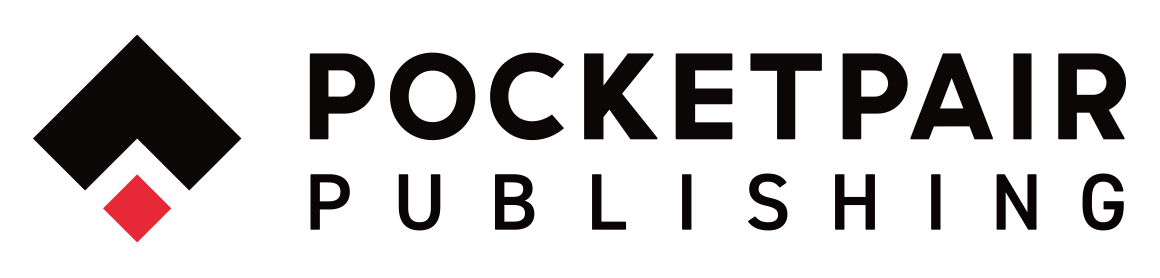
Pocketpair Publishing logo

In January 2025, following the success of Palworld—which sold 15 million copies in its first month—Pocketpair announced the launch of Pocketpair Publishing, a division focused on supporting independent game developers. The initiative aims to provide funding, development assistance, and publishing services for smaller studios. The first project under Pocketpair Publishing was the horror game Dead Take developed by Surgent Studios, known for Tales of Kenzera: Zau. This partnership is particularly notable as Surgent Studios had previously faced financial difficulties that led to a pause in development.

== Games ==
=== Developed ===
List of video games developed by PocketpairList of video games published by Pocketpair
Year	Title	Publisher	Platforms	Ref.
2019	Overdungeon	Lightning Games (formerly), Pocketpair (current)	Windows, Nintendo Switch, macOS	
2020	Craftopia	Pocketpair	Windows, Xbox One, Xbox Series X/S	
2022	AI: Art Impostor	Pocketpair	Android, iOS, Windows	
2026	Palworld	Pocketpair	Windows, Xbox One, Xbox Series X/S, PlayStation 5, macOS	

=== Published ===
Year	Title	Developer	Platforms	Ref.
2025	Dead Take	Surgent Studios	Windows	
2026	Cassette Boy	Wonderland Kazakiri	macOS, Nintendo Switch, PlayStation 4, PlayStation 5, Windows, Xbox One, Xbox Series X/S	
2026	Never Grave: The Witch and The Curse	Frontside 180	Nintendo Switch, PlayStation 4, PlayStation 5, Windows, Xbox Series X/S	
2026	Truckful	MythicOwl	Linux, macOS, Windows	
2026	Clicky Islands	Karrot Games	Linux, macOS, Windows	
2027	Vision Quench	WizMUD Games	Windows	
TBA	Windrose	Kraken Express	Windows	
TBA	Normal Fishing	The Bworg	Windows	
