= Unrecord =

Upcoming video game

- Developer: DRAMA
- Engine: Unreal Engine 5
- Platform: Windows
- Genre: First-person shooter
- Mode: Single-player

Unrecord is an upcoming first-person shooter game developed by DRAMA. The game received media attention when the developers released an early gameplay trailer in April 2023 showcasing the photorealistic graphics.

A release date for the game has not been announced.

== Gameplay ==
According to the game's press kit, Unrecord is a "tactical and narrative" single-player open world first-person shooter described as a combination of the adventure game Firewatch and the tactical shooter Ready or Not. Although realism is an "integral" part of the game, DRAMA have stated that Unrecord is not intended to be a simulation game.

Players will assume the role of a tactical police officer viewed primarily through the perspective of the character's police body camera. According to the game's Steam page description, the game's story will be comparable to a "detective novel or a thriller" with the player investigating several criminal cases and interacting with various characters through a dialogue system.

Although the body camera perspective is stated to be a key part of the gameplay experience, the developers have noted that accessibility options and adjustable camera settings will be implemented to reduce motion sickness.

== Development ==
The game is currently being developed by DRAMA, an independent video game studio established by French musician Théo "Foda C" Hiribarne of the French rap group Columbine and amateur Unreal Engine developer Alexandre Spindler. Michele Evangelista later joined the team as a level designer and environmental artist. Unrecord will be the studio's first official video game.

On October 12, 2022, Spindler posted a video on Twitter of a then-unnamed "body cam style game" that he was developing. The 45-second gameplay video went viral with 9.8 million views as of April 2023, with film director Neill Blomkamp praising it as "awesome". The viral success of the video prompted DRAMA to accelerate the game's development and announce the game earlier than expected to avoid losing momentum.

On April 19, 2023, DRAMA officially announced Unrecord with an early gameplay trailer uploaded on YouTube. The trailer shows the player character slowly entering a dilapidated building before chasing after and engaging in shootouts with several unidentified gunmen whose faces have been pixelated. After fighting through a warehouse, the player confronts a surrendering man before being interrupted by a large explosion. As of 2025, the video has gained 81.3 million views on Twitter.

The same day, the game was also made available for wishlisting on Steam and a press kit with additional information was made available to the public. In a post-reveal blog post on April 20, DRAMA stated that Unrecord is only being developed for PCs but remain open to the possibility of console ports. The game however is not being considered for development as a VR game. Within a week of its announcement, DRAMA announced that Unrecord was wishlisted by more than 600,000 Steam users despite not having an official release date.

Explaining how the studio achieved realistic-looking scenes, Evangelista explained that the environment was not scanned, but was created using megascans, Unreal Engine marketplace assets, and bespoke assets made by the developers.

=== Reactions to gameplay trailer ===
The first official trailer of Unrecord garnered widespread media attention for its realistic graphics and presentation. Michael McWhertor of Polygon described Unrecord as "unsettlingly real", Tyler Wilde of PC Gamer deemed the graphics "freakily photorealistic", and Christopher Castellaw of Game Rant said the trailer was "nearly indistinguishable from real camera footage."

The realistic depiction prompted accusations that Unrecord's gameplay trailer was faked using actual body camera footage or a pre-rendered tech demo. Crytivo founder Alex Koshelkov called the trailer "very, very fake" and accused the developers of simply overlaying assets on a real video. In response, Spindler posted a video showing the game's environment within the Unreal Engine user interface to prove that the game is a first-person shooter with free movement, and not an interactive film or a rail shooter. IGN also independently verified that the gameplay trailer is real by downloading the same Unreal Engine 5 level assets used by Unrecord for the 2022 trailer, which were compiled by BlueDrake42.

Criticism was also levied at the game's realistic presentation for being almost too similar to real life body camera videos of police shootings, particularly in the United States. Twitch streamer Trainwreckstv commented that trailer made him as "uncomfortable" as if watching a real leaked video of a military or police operation, adding that the game's graphics may legitimize political opinions arguing that video games condition young people towards violence. Keza McDonald of The Guardian noted that because the game exists in the context of real-world police violence, it is still inevitable that players will bring their own interpretations to the game.

Responding to allegations that Unrecord had either a pro-police or anti-police agenda, DRAMA posted a statement on Steam stating: "As a French studio addressing a global audience, the game does not engage in any foreign policy and is not inspired by any real-life events." The studio further added that Unrecord will avoid "undesirable topics such as discrimination, racism, violence against women and minorities" and "will have no biased or Manichaean take on criminal acts and police violence."

== See also ==
- Bodycam, another first-person shooter game notable for its realistic graphics
