= DarkwebSTREAMER =

Horror-RPG videogame in development

darkwebSTREAMER
- Developer: We Have Always Lived In The Forest
- Publisher: We Have Always Lived In The Forest
- Designer: Chantal Ryan
- Platform: Windows

darkwebSTREAMER is an upcoming video game by South Australian game studio We Have Always Lived In The Forest, led by game designer and anthropologist Chantal Ryan.

== Description ==
The game is a psychological horror RPG simulation game inspired by online streaming culture, para-social relationships and the grind of content creation, and simultaneously explores the aesthetics and culture of the 1990s and 2000s internet. It explores themes of how far a streamer might willing to go to gain wealth, power, or fame at the expense of one's own well-being and calls itself a 'narrative roguelite' due to almost every aspect of the game, including the story, characters and mechanics, being randomly generated every time you play whilst also featuring permadeath.

The game features the world's first procedurally generated internet. Emily Spindler of Kotaku described the game as 'a commentary on all the internet has been, is, and will be'.

The game has also been noted for its complex ARG, which kicked off via its trailer launched at PC Gamer's PC Gaming Show's "Most Wanted Showcase". The trailer notably was produced by Jack James Troisi, who led VFX on psychological horror film Talk To Me. A second darkwebSTREAMER trailer produced by Troisi was released at IGN Fan Fest in March 2024. darkwebSTREAMER has also been remarked on for its unusual website, which evokes the style of the 90s internet.

== Reception ==
The game has featured widely across major games and news media, including in the New York Times and ABC News, and was notably showcased at the 2024 Tribeca Festival where it was nominated for the Tribeca Games Award for "demonstrating artistic excellence in storytelling". It has been selected as one of the best games of Gamescom, GDC, Day Of The Devs and PAX Australia, and has received multiple award nominations, including at SXSW Sydney (2023) and PAX Australia (2023), where it won the PAX Indie Showcase award.
