= Wylde Flowers =

2022 video game

- Developer: Studio Drydock
- Publisher: Studio Drydock
- Platforms: macOS; Windows; Nintendo Switch
- Release: macOS; February 18, 2022; Windows, Switch; September 20, 2022
- Genre: Farm life sim
- Mode: Single-player

Wylde Flowers is a 2022 farm life sim developed and published by Studio Drydock. It was released on February 18, 2022, for macOS as a launch title for Apple Arcade, and September 20, 2022 for Windows, and for Nintendo Switch. In the game, players play as a witch coming into her powers and discovering her new community. The game received positive reviews on release.

A prequel game, titled Wylde Society, is currently under development. The story will center around Vivian Wylde and running her boarding house.

== Gameplay ==
Wylde Flowers is a farming life simulator. Players take control of a young woman with the destiny of becoming a witch. There is a linear story that leads the player to interact with various community members as they discover the secrets and conflicts within the town. Combat is not a feature of the game. Relationships and friendships are possible with townsfolk and there are several romanceable characters from multiple genders. There are multiple settings for how long a day will last, so users can play at their own speed.

== Plot ==
The game begins with the main character, Tara, visiting her ailing grandmother Hazel on the island Fairhaven to help care for her and work at her farm. Tara quickly meets all of the members of the town at the request of Otto, the town mayor. She learns how her grandmother is a pillar of the community and is later introduced to her grandmother's coven of witches, who conceal their identities with robes and masks. Tara is invited to join them and goes through initiation rituals in order to get to know the coven. All the while, a mysterious figure named Raven, who is also a witch, is attempting to gain access to the grove where the witches regularly meet. Otto suspects that there could be witches living among them and Hazel eventually dies of old age. Once the farm is restored, a rancher named Marty moves in and Tara also meets a meteorologist named Giva. She later discovers a hidden realm called Ravenwood Hollow where four magical beings live. Over time, she learns the identities of her fellow witches, who turn out to be some of the townsfolks, and their leader is revealed to be her childhood friend Lina.

Alongside fellow witch Violet, Tara steals a notebook belonging to Cameron, the church pastor, while disguised as a cat and learn of his beliefs of witches. They later steal a keystone from the town hall to access a dangerous realm called the Gloaming to search for Violet's missing mother Gloria. Both actions cause Otto to become more alert of suspicious activities in Fairhaven. They unintentionally release evil spirits called wraiths, who cause havoc around town and possess people to make them blame others for the incidents, forces Tara to use spells to extort the wraiths to clear their names. At one point, she has to sabotage Giva's flying drone to prevent it from accidentally discovering the coven. The witches soon recruit Francis, the owner of the town's jewelry shop, to help them deal with one of the wraiths and he eventually joins the group. When Parker, Lina's husband, becomes possessed, Lina reveals her secret to force the wraith out of him. Eventually, the townsfolks learn of Otto's ulterior motives, but it is revealed that he is being forced to commit these acts by Raven. When a young girl named Juliet goes missing, Tara discovers that she is held captive in the coven and after the witches free her, they reveal their secret to Juliet and her mother Sophia. Learning that it was Raven who trapped Juliet, and that she was used to open the gateway to the Gloaming. Her true identity is revealed to Vanessa, Otto's wife, they head to the Gloaming to stop her. It turns out she was rejected from the coven and is seeking revenge by locating the heart of the Wellspring, the witches' source of power, to gain ultimate power, using the wraiths as a distraction. Westley, one of Ravenwood Hollow's inhabitants, unintentionally helped her with her plot. Not knowing that what she found isn't the Wellspring's heart, she ends up being possessed by the final wraith, who was manipulating her all along, but this also frees Gloria, who reunites with Violet. The witches head to town to stop Vanessa while revealing to the townsfolks of who they really are. After defeating the wraith, Vanessa returns to normal and apologizes for her actions. In the aftermath, Otto resigns from being mayor and he and Vanessa leave the island while Gloria becomes the new mayor.

== Reception ==
Reception

Aggregate score
Aggregator	Score
Metacritic	PC: 82/100; Steam: Overwhelmingly Positive

According to the review aggregator website Metacritic, Wylde Flowers received "generally favorable reviews" for its PC, and Switch versions. Adventure Gamers says it had a "strong narrative core" but stresses that customization of the main character is only possible through clothing and hair styling during gameplay. WellPlayed says the game is welcoming from the beginning and that the fully voice-acted cast is diverse and interesting. Digitally downloaded is positive, but notes that purchasing animals can be tedious, if multiple are wanted. Prima Games notes that the game starts slowly, but ramps up to a good pace after a bit. They also say the game is formulaic which is good for introducing new people to the genre, but could be a downside for veterans.

=== Awards ===
Wylde Flowers received several awards and was nominated for more. It was an honoree for Action and Adventure Games and Best Game Design in the 2023 Webby Awards. There, it was also nominated for Best User Experience. At the Gayming Awards, it won the award for Best LGBTQ+ Indie Game. Also that year, it won AGDA's award for Excellence in Ongoing Games. In 2022, it won Apple's Arcade Game of the Year and an award for design.
