= Skillshot City =

2017 action video game

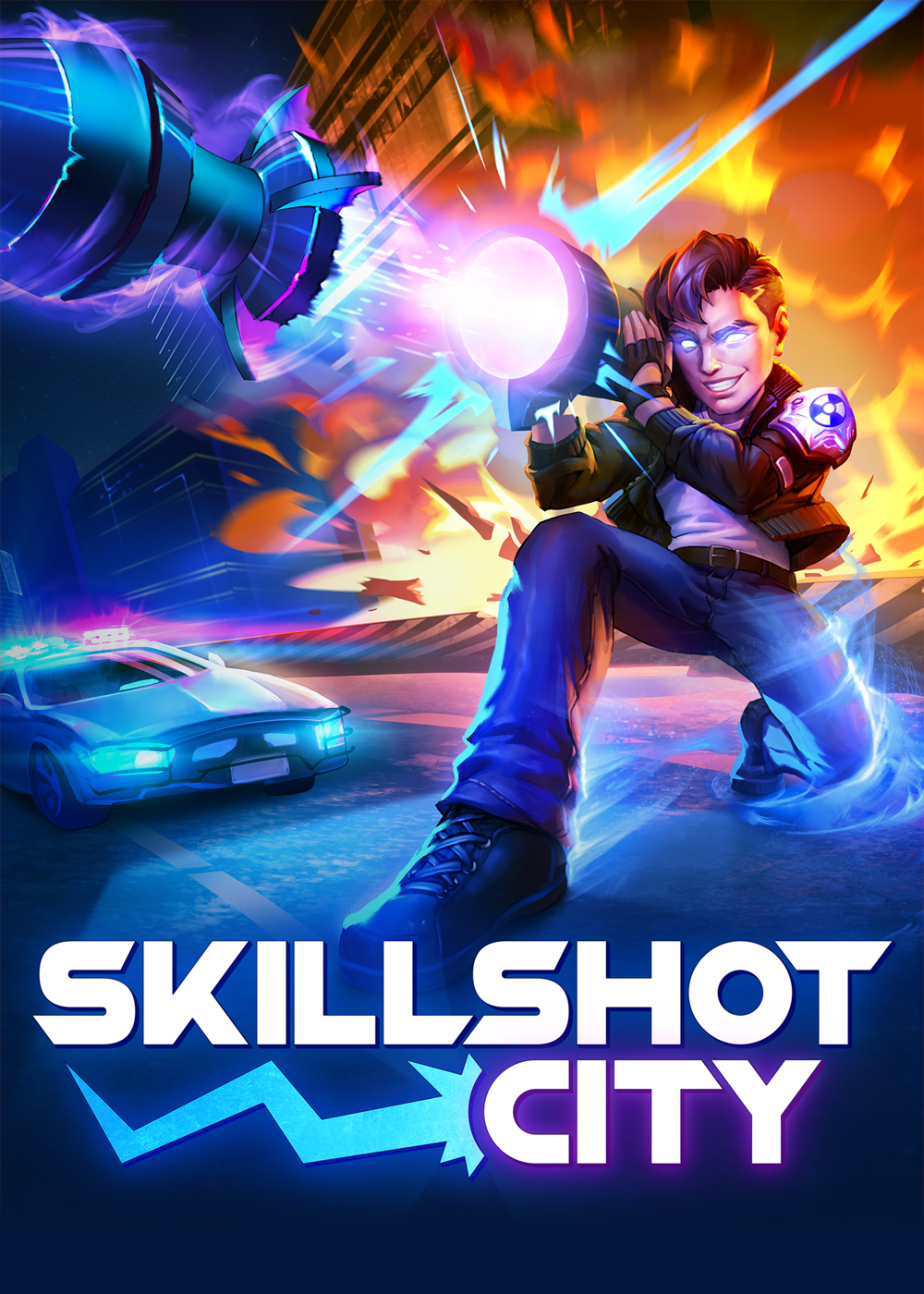
- Developer: Nik Nak Studios
- Publisher: Nik Nak Studios
- Platforms: Microsoft Windows, Linux
- Release: 23 May 2017 (early access)
- Genres: Top-down shooter Roguelike; Battle royale
- Modes: Single-player, multiplayer

Skillshot City is a free-to-play PvP roguelike, battle royale video game developed and published by Nik Nak Studios. It was originally released with the name Geneshift on Steam via early access on May 23, 2017.

== Gameplay ==
Skillshot City is a PvP roguelite top-down shooter. It combines elements of battle royale and roguelike design. A match consists of 3 back-to-back battle royale rounds, where the winner of the final round wins the game. Winning earlier rounds gives players bonus experience, score, and a stronger vote for the next round modifier. The core loop consists of killing other players, taking out cops, and completing missions to level up. This lets players draft special abilities during a match, with the hopes of creating a strong synergistic build before the final round's showdown.

The game features a skill drafting system in which players choose from randomly offered abilities as they level up, creating different build combinations in each match. A large part of ones success comes from your ability to spot synergies and combos in real time. Combat includes firearms, vehicles, environmental hazards, and non-player characters such as police units that drop experience when defeated.

In contrast to most battle royales, if a player is eliminated they stay in the game. They are put into what's called a "zombie state" where they can still fight, loot, and level up. But they can not become the last person standing as a zombie. To win the round, they need to first "revive" by winning a special supply drop, which contains heart fragments, of which 4 are needed to get back to life. Alternatively, they can kill living players for one fragment apiece.

== Development ==
On November 28, 2022, the game went free to play. The name then changed to Skillshot City on July 9, 2025, as reported by PCGamesN.
