= Mysplaced =

Upcoming video game

- Developer: Clear Sky Games
- Publisher: Clear Sky Games
- Engine: Unreal Engine
- Platforms: PlayStation 4; PlayStation 5; Windows; Xbox One; Xbox Series X/S
- Genre: Metroidvania
- Mode: Single-player

Mysplaced is an upcoming indie Metroidvania video game developed and published by Clear Sky Games for PlayStation 4, PlayStation 5, Windows, Xbox One and Xbox Series X/S. Inspired by The Legend of Zelda: A Link to the Past, it incorporates a top-down perspective similar to classic dungeon-crawling adventures.

== Gameplay ==
Mysplaced is an action game viewed from a top-down isometric perspective. It uses a heart-based health system and interactive environments, such as long grass that players can slash through. The gameplay emphasizes puzzle-solving and exploration across seven unique interconnected biomes. In addition to melee attacks, players can use a chemistry system to manipulate the environment in order to solve puzzles, fight enemies, and influence outcomes through a hidden karma system. Unlike most games, solving some puzzles will require real-world research.

== Reception ==
In 2022, Mysplaced received the Audience Choice Award at the Rogue Jam, along with a prize of $50,000 and a right of first refusal agreement with Rogue Games. The competition featured submissions from developers worldwide, showcasing their unreleased games. The judging panel for Rogue Jam included Peer Schneider, EVP and CCO of IGN, and Reggie Fils-Aimé, former president of Nintendo of America. The judges evaluated the entries over several months before selecting the winners.

Pre-release reception of the game was largely centered around the game's similarity to Zelda and the ensuing backlash, with the game being accused of cloning the aforementioned series. John Walker of Kotaku debated the accusations, saying that people had been "brainwashed" by the copyright industry to believe that homages are criminal, and calling the game itself "intriguing".

=== Controversy ===
Mysplaced has faced criticism from some fans of The Legend of Zelda for its similarities to the art style of the Link's Awakening remake. After IGN previewed Mysplaced, comparisons began to emerge online, with fans analyzing the footage to identify any direct imitations. One comparison highlighted similarities in layout and assets that appeared to be modified from Link's Awakening. Additionally, critiques have noted near-identical fonts used in game scenes such as opening a chest, and similarities in combat and movement animations. However, differences have also been pointed out, including the design of in-game currency, the types of trees, and the overall layout of the game world.
