= Windrose (video game) =

Upcoming video game

- Developer: Kraken Express
- Publisher: Pocketpair
- Engine: Unreal Engine 5
- Platform: Windows
- Release: April 14, 2026 (early access)
- Genre: Survival
- Modes: Single-player, multiplayer

Windrose is an upcoming survival video game developed by Kraken Express and published by Pocketpair. It was released in early access on April 14, 2026.

== Gameplay ==
Windrose is a co-op survival game with a base-building element. It has elements of base building, and has ship to ship combat.

== Development ==
Windrose was developed by the Uzbekistan-based company Kraken Express. Inspired by Assassin's Creed IV: Black Flag, it was originally thought of as a MMORPG before being reworked into a co-op survival game. While it is currently a PC only game, the developers have shown interest in bringing it to console.

== Reception ==
=== Sales ===
Windrose has sold more than a million copies six days after launch.
