= Manveer Heir =

Indian-American video game developer

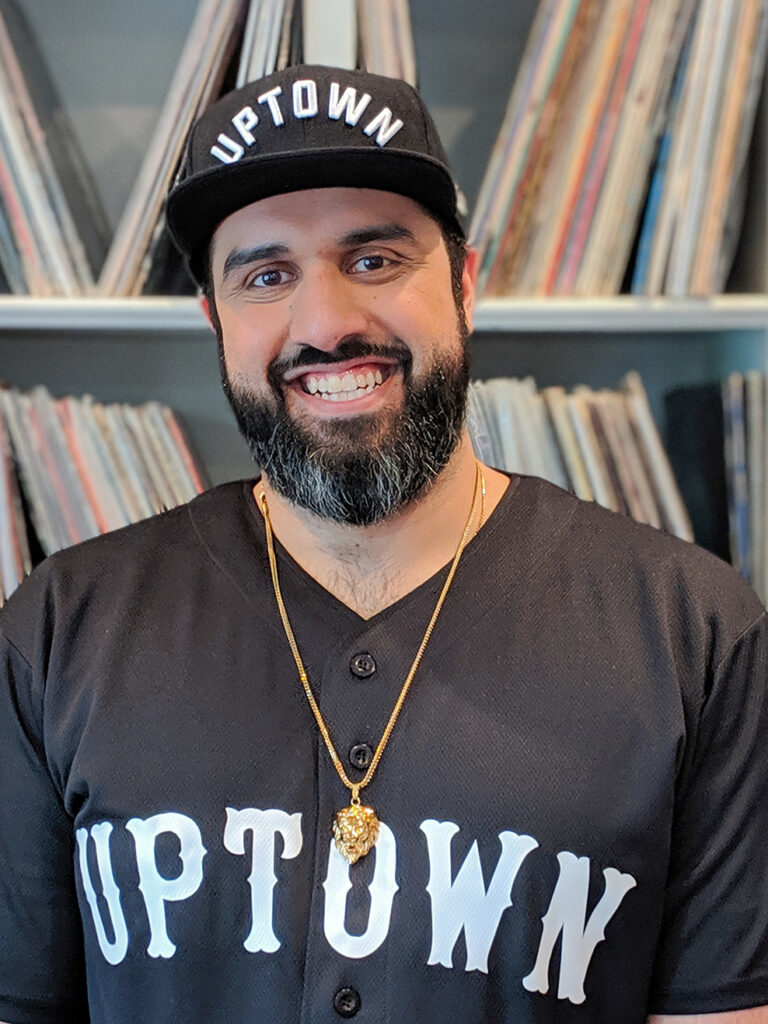
- Heir in 2019
- Occupation: Video game developer
- Years active: 2005–present
- Notable work: Wolfenstein; Mass Effect 3 Mass Effect: Andromeda

Manveer Heir is an American video game developer. After working at Big Huge Games, Raven Software and BioWare, Heir co-founded his own studio, Brass Lion Entertainment, in 2017. Heir is known to be outspoken on issues related to diversity in video games.

== Career ==
Heir grew up in Rockville, Maryland and attended college at Virginia Tech, graduating in 2004 with a degree in computer science and a minor in mathematics. He interned at Big Huge Games around 2005 before moving to Raven Software, at the time a subsidiary of Activision. At Raven, he worked for about four and a half years on the 2009 Wolfenstein game, initially as a gameplay programmer before moving to be a game designer for the title. He had been named as lead designer on another unannounced product, prior to a period of financial difficulty at Raven that resulted in Activision ordering multiple layoffs and cancellation of the unannounced project for the studio to focus on support for the Call of Duty series. Heir, while still employed there, was disappointed in Activision's decision to take away any work on new intellectual property and offload it to Bungie, and decided to quit the company. Heir subsequently moved to BioWare Montreal around 2010, where he worked as a gameplay designer on Mass Effect 3 (2012) and Mass Effect: Andromeda (2017).

Heir stated that, during development of Andromeda, he and other colleagues from the development team attempted, albeit unsuccessfully, to convince the project leads to remove a perceived colonialist slant to the player's forcible colonization of alien planets. Heir became the subject of harassment by the Gamergate movement shortly before the release of Andromeda in 2017, after they claimed that parts of the game, such as the appearances of female characters, forced a "liberal agenda" on players. An online petition was started to try to have Heir fired from BioWare, though BioWare backed Heir. However, after the development was completed but before Andromeda shipped, Heir left BioWare, citing that he had become weary over the last twelve years after enduring crunch time, and grown tired of being told to keep quiet over his concerns about games, as well as being put off by the attitudes from the Gamergate movement.

=== Brass Lion Entertainment ===
After leaving BioWare, Heir established a new game development studio to focus on games relating to race and diversity based on his own experiences. He reached out to Bryna Dabby Smith, a former production crew member from Electronic Arts and Activision with work on games such as Sleeping Dogs, about assisting with the business side of this studio. Word that Heir was establishing a new studio reached Rashad Redic, a game world designer with Bethesda Game Studios with work in The Elder Scrolls V: Skyrim and Fallout 4, who expressed interest in supporting the two. The three co-founded Brass Lion Entertainment in 2017 after establishing the vision of this studio over phone calls. Heir had wanted to call the studio Big Mouth Games, reflecting his outspokenness, but found this conflicted with the program Big Mouth on Netflix. Because of the studio vision on diversity, they wanted to be more inclusive in their hiring practices, bringing in minorities and others from underrepresented backgrounds.

The studio remained quiet over the first two years as they developed their first title. Heir formally announced the studio in November 2019 along with their first game, Corner Wolves, an action role-playing game set in the 1990s in Harlem with the protagonist Jacinte as a young afro-Latino that is caught in the midst of the drug war while she searches for her father's killer. Race is planned to play a major role in the game, with different non-player characters reacting differently to Jacinte. The game is also envisioned to have short jobs like the Shenmue series though the types of jobs available will depend on player choice and their relationships with other characters. The game's release will be preceded by a narrative podcast to establish Jacinte's story, being developed by Loud Speakers Network and Marginal Mediaworks.

== Views on diversity in video games ==
Heir has been outspoken on the need for video games to present better diversity of characters when it comes to race, gender, and other cultural alignments. Heir has said his views are not about achieving affirmative action within the video game industry, but believes better stories and gameplay can be had by considering underrepresented minorities as main characters, moving away from the typical "male power fantasy" that many video games present.

One of his more recognized statements on diversity was given at the 2014 Game Developers Conference (GDC) in his talk "Misogyny, Racism and Homophobia: Where Do Video Games Stand?" where he challenged game developers to include more minority representation in video games, including women and LGBTQ people, asserting that the industry is afraid to focus games on such characters. Heir questioned claims that games featuring underrepresented minorities sold fewer than those featuring male and Caucasian characters, and pointed to Assassin's Creed III: Liberation and Papers, Please as games that effectively dealt with race and culture. Heir's speech was considered one of the most important talks given at that year's GDC, and Polygon named Heir one of their '50 admirable gaming people of 2014' for it.
