= Frogun =

2022 video game

- Developer: Molegato
- Publishers: Top Hat Studios, Inc.
- Producer: Andy Andi Han
- Platforms: Microsoft Windows; Linux; Nintendo Switch; PlayStation 4; PlayStation 5; Xbox One; Xbox Series X/S
- Release: August 2, 2022
- Genre: Platform
- Modes: Single-player, multiplayer

Frogun is a 3D platform video game developed by Molegato and published by Top Hat Studios on August 2, 2022. The player controls a character who must navigate levels and collect items by jumping and using her frog as a grappling gun.

A standalone sequel, Frogun Encore, was released in 2024.

== Gameplay ==
Gameplay consists of 3D platforming, with the player utilizing a frog that serves as a grappling gun.

The game features a single-player mode and includes a one on one player versus player option as an unlockable reward.

== Development ==
Development of the game was performed by the studio Molegato. The game was crowdfunded with Kickstarter in July 2021. The aesthetics of the game were inspired by various home console games from the 1990s and handheld console games from the 2000s. In development it was decided that the game would not stick to specific technical limitations associated with those consoles, leading to the use of "32-bit" style graphics alongside "16-bit" style audio.

Frogun was published on August 2, 2022 by Top Hat Studios Inc. for Microsoft Windows, Linux, Nintendo Switch, PlayStation 4, PlayStation 5, Xbox One, Xbox Series X/S. Limited Run Games published a physical edition of the game for Nintendo Switch, PlayStation 4, and PlayStation 5.

== Reception ==
Reception

Aggregate scores
Aggregator	Score
Metacritic	PC: 76/100; PS5: 59/100; NS: 74/100
OpenCritic	64% recommend

Review scores
Publication	Score
Destructoid	6/10
Gamezebo	3/5
Nintendo Life	7/10
Nintendo World Report	7.5/10
Push Square	5/10
NF Magazine	7/10

Frogun received "mixed or average" reviews for PlayStation 5 and Switch, according to review aggregator Metacritic; the Windows version received "generally favorable" reviews. Fellow review aggregator OpenCritic assessed that the game received fair approval, being recommended by 64% of critics.

Reviewers generally noted the difficulty of fully completing the game. In their review, Nintendo Life particularly noted the difficulty associated with racing sections of the game. Push Square's review noted the difficulty of some platforming elements.

The graphical style and general gameplay feel being similar to games from the 1990s was commonly cited by reviewers as a distinguishing feature.

Writing for PC Gamer, Matt Paprocki noted the appeal of the game for speedrunners.

== Sequel ==
A standalone sequel/expansion Frogun Encore was released on June 25, 2024.
