= Core Decay =

- Developers: Ivar Hill; Slipgate Ironworks
- Publisher: 3D Realms
- Engine: Unity
- Platforms: Windows; Linux
- Genres: Immersive sim, First-person shooter, action role-playing
- Mode: Single-player

Core Decay is an upcoming indie first-person action role-playing video game developed by Ivar Hill and Slipgate Ironworks, and published by 3D Realms. Described as a "philosophical sci-fi adventure", the game takes inspiration from classic 1990s games Deus Ex, Descent, and System Shock.

== Gameplay ==
Core Decay is an "atmospheric immersive sim. The game is experienced through a first-person perspective, and focuses on exploration of the game world to accomplish goals. The player can interact with NPCs, collect logs and messages, hack computer systems, and engage in combat with enemies. First-person shooting is a core game mechanic, though often not necessary for progression. The abilities of the player-character can be enhanced by finding cybernetic implants, which grant improvements such as damage resistance, more powerful attacks, and better hacking ability. There is also a detailed damage model that tracks injury to the player-character across specific body parts, leading to specific debilitating effects as the player is damaged by hostile elements.

== Plot ==
In the future, ecological collapse has caused society to crumble. Governments have given way to massive corporate powers. Facing extinction, a mysterious group of conspirators has formed to ensure the survival of humanity by any means necessary. The game begins as the player-character wakes up in a cold storage pod without any idea of what is going on, and now as much a machine as human. The player must explore the perilous installations of this shadowy organization and discover what they are planning.

== Development ==
Ivar Hill created Core Decay as a personal side project while working as a professional game developer. He cites his own love of games like Descent and Deus Ex as inspiration for what he wanted to make. As a one-man team, he could not achieve the depth of such AAA titles, but could borrow many elements of those games such as emergent gameplay styles. As development progressed, other personnel joined the project to help with game programming, music, and art.

Hill selected Unity as the game engine mainly due to his own familiarity, but also to allow strong multi-platform support. The game was developed simultaneously for both PC and mobile platforms, with only control schemes changing between versions. Though using a modern game engine, the game world is constructed with low-resolution models and textures. This serves both the retro shooter feel of the game, as well as the small development team. Support for mobile platforms was later abandoned and the game was developed for only the PC platform.

3D Realms partnered with Hill to publish and co-develop the game.
