= Blackfrost: The Long Dark 2 =

Upcoming video game

- Developer: Hinterland Studio
- Publisher: Hinterland Studio
- Platform: Windows
- Genre: Survival
- Modes: Single-player, multiplayer

Blackfrost: The Long Dark 2 is an upcoming survival video game developed and published by Hinterland Studio, serving as the sequel to their 2014 title The Long Dark. Similar to its predecessor, Blackfrost takes place in Northern Canada, following a geomagnetic storm which has wiped out all electricity worldwide, and focuses on surviving the elements, while managing various player aspects such as health, hunger, and resources. An early access release was planned for 2026; the status of the project is unknown.

== Content ==
Several new features have been teased on the game's Steam page, such as in-game NPCs and co-op functionality between players. Various environmental hazards are planned to be included, including the titular radioactive "Blackfrost", a nuclear waste product emitted by a reactor within the industrial city of Harmont. It will feature larger cities than its predecessor.

Blackfrost will contain a new "will to live" function along with physical needs.

== Development ==
Blackfrost was first teased in January 2024 as a possible sequel to The Long Dark. It was officially announced in December 2024 at The Game Awards. Early access was planned for 2026.
