= Bodycam (video game) =

- Developer: Reissad Studio
- Engine: Unreal Engine 5
- Platform: Windows
- Release: June 7, 2024 (early access)
- Genre: First-person shooter
- Mode: Multiplayer

Bodycam is an upcoming multiplayer first-person shooter video game being developed by indie company Reissad Studio. The game was released as an early access title on June 7, 2024.

The multiplayer game stands out for its near-photorealistic computer graphics and realistic animations, leading the shooter to share characteristics with simulations and tactical shooters. A distinctive feature of the game are the viewmodels of the player characters simulated to imitate real footage from police and military bodycams, including the wide-angle fish-eye lenses and pixelating of character faces.

== Gameplay ==
Bodycam is a tactical shooter played from an ultra-realistic first-person perspective. The game emphasizes visual immersion through dynamic fisheye lens distortion, chromatic aberration, realistic lighting, camera sway, and a minimal head-up display (HUD) without traditional crosshairs or ammunition counters.

Weapon handling relies on simulated physical inertia and procedural recoil, where firearms move independently from the center of the screen rather than following a fixed line of sight. To check ammunition or switch weapons, players must rely on visual and audio cues. Additionally, player character faces feature a pixelated blur effect designed to mimic redacted law enforcement video footage.

=== Game modes ===
The game features seven game modes: Wingman, Team Deathmatch, Versus, Hard point, Gun game, Deathmatch, Zombies, as well as a training tutorial.

=== Equipment ===
The update under the name of "Locked & Loaded" launched September 2026 and introduced FPV flying drones and ground drones (RC cars) into the gameplay as items of equipment or weapons. When using the drones, players can choose between arcade-style handling and a driving or flight simulation mode.

== Development ==
Bodycam was developed using Unreal Engine 5 by French indie developers Luca and Leo, who founded Reissad Studio while aged 17 and 20, respectively. What began as a personal project aimed at testing the lighting capabilities of Unreal Engine 5 rapidly expanded in scope. Following closed alpha tests and public playtests on Steam, the game launched into Early Access on June 7, 2024.

Post-launch updates focused on performance optimization and content additions. On November 8, 2024, a major update added a cooperative zombie survival mode alongside the Village map. In November 2025, an upgrade to Unreal Engine 5.5 overhauled the game's rendering pipeline, shaders, post-processing, volumetric fog, and texture streaming, converting approximately 90 percent of in-game textures into Virtual Textures while optimizing CPU and GPU utilization.

The major update titled "Locked & Loaded" (v0.8) launched September 2, 2026, and overhauled the animation, menu, audio, and physics systems. The update introduced a stress-driven dynamic reload system—where weapon reload animations depend procedurally on suppression and combat intensity alongside localized acoustic pressure wave audio simulations, revised ragdoll physics, and new tactical equipment such as drones.

== Reception ==
Ranked as the best-selling game on the Steam platform during the first week of its early access release despite mixed reviews, the game sold 800,000 units in July 2024, generating sales of approximately €20 million. Bodycam has been praised for its realistic graphics, sound design, and gun play. The game's graphics and environments have been compared to that of Unrecord, as the two games have graphic elements in common.
