= Afterworld (video game) =

- Developer: Paradox Development Studio
- Publisher: Paradox Interactive
- Director: Dan Lind
- Platforms: Windows; macOS; Linux
- Genres: Grand strategy
- Modes: Single-player, multiplayer

Afterworld is an upcoming grand strategy game developed by Paradox Development Studio and published by Paradox Interactive. In the game, the player must guide a tribe rebuilding civilization in post-apocalyptic North America.

== Gameplay ==
The game is set in a post-apocalyptic North America. At the beginning of the game, players can select an origin story for their faction. Gameplay involves rebuilding civilization as one of several factions of apocalypse survivors, starting from building out a home for a tribe and scaling to larger, continent-scale conflict. As players progress, they will be able to expand, recover lost technology, and decide how to deal with rival factions and warlords from before the apocalypse. Throughout the game, players must make decisions that will influence the course of the campaign. The game also supports both cooperative and competitive multiplayer modes at launch.

== Development ==
The post-apocalyptic setting represents a departure from Paradox's historical grand strategy games, and is the studio's first original setting in a decade. It was announced at Gamescom on August 25, 2026, with no set release date. Prior to the announcement, the game’s name and other details were accidentally leaked on the developer's official forums and Discord server.
