= Carnivore (disambiguation) =

A carnivore is an animal with a diet consisting primarily of meat.

Carnivore may also refer to:

- Carnivora, an order of primarily carnivorous mammals
- A person who supports carnism
- Carnivore diet, a diet composed primarily or exclusively of meat

== Business ==
- Carnivore (restaurant), a famous restaurant in Nairobi, Kenya
- Carnivore (software), a Federal Bureau of Investigation Ethernet tapping system

== Film and television ==
- Carnivore, a.k.a. Beasts of Prey, a 1985 South Korean film directed by Kim Ki-young
- Carnivores (The Shield)

== Games ==
- Carnivores (series), a series of games developed by Action Forms
  - Carnivores (video game), a 1998 first-person shooter video game

== Music ==
- Carnivores (band), an indie rock band from Atlanta, Georgia
- Carnivore (band), a thrash metal band from New York
- Carnivore (Carnivore album), 1985
- Carnivore (Body Count album), 2020
- "Carnivore" (song), a 2014 song by Starset
- "Carnivore", a song by Jewel from Picking Up the Pieces
- Carnivorous (album), a 2020 album by Hawkwind
