= Rocky Mountain Trophy Hunter =

Video game series

The series logo.

Rocky Mountain Trophy Hunter is a series of hunting games developed or published by Sunstorm Interactive.

== Games ==
Game	Details
Rocky Mountain Trophy Hunter: Interactive Big Game Hunting Original release date(s): NA: 1998	Release years by system: 1998—Macintosh, Windows; 2000—Game Boy Color
Rocky Mountain Trophy Hunter: Interactive Big Game Hunting Original release date(s): NA: 1998	Notes: Developed by Sunstorm Interactive and published by WizardWorks; Released on Game Boy Color in 2000. It was developed by Xantera and published by Infogrames; It was later bundled with Rocky Mountain Trophy Hunter: Alaskan Expedition under the title Rocky Mountain Trophy Hunter: Special Edition Two-Pack; In 2009 it was released as a free download by Atari
Rocky Mountain Trophy Hunter: Alaskan Expedition Original release date(s): NA: 2000	Release years by system: 2000—Windows
Rocky Mountain Trophy Hunter: Alaskan Expedition Original release date(s): NA: 2000	Notes: Developed by Sunstorm Interactive and published by WizardWorks; It is an expansion pack for the Windows version of Rocky Mountain Trophy Hunter: Interactive Big Game Hunting; New weapons include crossbow and .30-06 rifle; It was later bundled with Rocky Mountain Trophy Hunter: Interactive Big Game Hunting under the title Rocky Mountain Trophy Hunter: Special Edition Two-Pack
Rocky Mountain Trophy Hunter II: Above the Treeline Original release date(s): NA: 1999	Release years by system: 1999—Windows
Rocky Mountain Trophy Hunter II: Above the Treeline Original release date(s): NA: 1999	Notes: Developed by Sunstorm Interactive & SCS Software and published by WizardWorks; It is the sequel to Rocky Mountain Trophy Hunter: Interactive Big Game Hunting; Was developed using SCS Software's TERRENG 3.1 engine
Rocky Mountain Trophy Hunter 3: Trophies of the West Original release date(s): NA: May 12, 2000	Release years by system: 2000—Windows
Rocky Mountain Trophy Hunter 3: Trophies of the West Original release date(s): NA: May 12, 2000	Notes: Developed by Sunstorm Interactive & SCS Software and published by Infogrames; It is the third game in the series and was developed using an enhanced Sunstorm STE engine

== See also ==
- Deer Hunter, a deer hunting series of video games also by Sunstorm Interactive.
