= Deer Hunter (1997 video game) =

1997 video game

- Developer: Sunstorm Interactive
- Publisher: WizardWorks
- Series: Deer Hunter
- Platforms: Windows; Macintosh; Game Boy Color
- Release: October 1997

Deer Hunter, also known as Deer Hunter: Interactive Hunting Experience, is a 1997 video game developed by Sunstorm Interactive and published by WizardWorks.

== Gameplay ==
In Deer Hunter, players take on the role of a camo-clad hunter navigating four distinct environments—from dense woodlands to a forest and even a target range—in pursuit of elusive deer. This game emphasizes realism and patience. Players must track deer using environmental clues like droppings and bedding, then strategically lure them using tools such as deer calls, rattles, and attractant scents. Once a deer is spotted, players choose from a selection of weapons—shotgun, rifle, or bow—and aim carefully. Binoculars and an overhead map help with scouting and positioning. The game's design encourages thoughtful tracking and precision.

== Development ==
The impetus for the game was a Wal-Mart executive commenting to a WizardWorks sales representative that if he had a game about deer hunting, he could sell thousands of copies.

The game was developed by a five-member team in three months with a budget of $125,000. The game had two add-packs, Deer Hunter Extended Season and Deer Hunter Companion.

== Reception ==
Reception

Review scores
Publication	Score
Computer Gaming World	2.5/5
Computer Games Magazine	2/5
Gamezilla	68%
GameSpot	5.5/10
Inside Mac Games	1.5/5

Computer Games Magazine gave the game a score of 2 out of 5 stating "Deer Hunter takes some good first steps, but it has a long way to go to make a good computer game."

In early 1998, Deer Hunter appeared in the top 10 of PC Data's best-seller list. Sunstorm Interactive president Anthony Campiti remarked, "Obviously we're happy about the sales. We struck on a market that was untapped, the box looked good, and it was a good product." Globally, the game sold 500,000 copies by March 1998 and over 1 million by October 1998. PC Data eventually ranked Deer Hunter as the second best-selling game during 1998 in the US, beaten only by StarCraft.
