= Carnivores (video game series) =

- Genres: Sports, first-person shooter
- Developers: Action Forms; Sunstorm Interactive; Tatem Games; Beatshapers; Vogster Entertainment; Digital Dreams Entertainment
- Publishers: WizardWorks; Infogrames; Tatem Games; Beatshapers; Vogster Entertainment
- Platforms: Microsoft Windows; iOS; PlayStation Portable; PlayStation 3; Android; Nintendo Switch; PlayStation 4; Xbox One
- First release: Carnivores; November 30, 1998
- Latest release: Carnivores: Dinosaur Hunt; June 1, 2021

Carnivores is a series of hunting simulation video games featuring prehistoric species ranging from dinosaurs to extinct megafauna. The first three games – Carnivores (1998), Carnivores 2 (1999), and Carnivores: Ice Age (2001) – were developed for the PC by Action Forms and published by WizardWorks. The fourth game, Carnivores: Cityscape, was developed by Sunstorm Interactive and released by Infogrames in 2002.

Carnivores: Dinosaur Hunter, the fifth installment, was released for iOS, Android, PlayStation 3 (PS3), and PlayStation Portable (PSP) in 2010. Beatshapers developed the PS3 and PSP version, and Tatem Games developed the other versions. Carnivores: Ice Age was ported to iOS and Android in 2011. September 2013 marked the release of Carnivores: Dinosaur Hunter HD for the PS3. Two years later, Carnivores: Dinosaur Hunter Reborn was released for the PC. The latest game, Carnivores: Dinosaur Hunt, was released on June 1, 2021. Today, the franchise has a huge modding community on sites like ModDB, with some mods being noticed by the original developers. The community has managed to reverse engineer the original game engine, AtmosFear by Action Forms, modifying the source code to push the game engine far beyond its original limits.

== Games ==
Game	Details
Carnivores Original release date(s): NA: November 30, 1998	Release years by system: November 30, 1998—Windows
Carnivores Original release date(s): NA: November 30, 1998	Notes: Developed by Action Forms and published by WizardWorks; It was created using the AtmosFear game engine; It received a score of 64 percent from review aggregator website GameRankings
Carnivores 2 Original release date(s): NA: October 31, 1999	Release years by system: October 31, 1999—Windows
Carnivores 2 Original release date(s): NA: October 31, 1999	Notes: Developed by Action Forms and published by WizardWorks; It received a score of 66.5 percent from GameRankings
Carnivores: Ice Age Original release date(s): NA: January 15, 2001	Release years by system: January 15, 2001—Windows; February 8, 2011—iOS; December 13, 2012—Android
Carnivores: Ice Age Original release date(s): NA: January 15, 2001	Notes: Developed by Action Forms and published by WizardWorks; Review aggregator website Metacritic gave the original game a score of 54 out of 100, and gave the iOS version a score of 75
Carnivores: Cityscape Original release date(s): NA: March 27, 2002	Release years by system: March 27, 2002—Windows
Carnivores: Cityscape Original release date(s): NA: March 27, 2002	Notes: Developed by Sunstorm Interactive and published by Infogrames; It was created using the Serious Engine; It received a score of 56 from Metacritic
Carnivores: Dinosaur Hunter Original release date(s): NA: June 12, 2010	Release years by system: June 12, 2010—iOS; August 2010–PlayStation 3 (PS3) and PlayStation Portable (PSP); June 2012–Android
Carnivores: Dinosaur Hunter Original release date(s): NA: June 12, 2010	Notes: Developed by Tatem Games (iOS and Android) and Beatshapers (PS3 and PSP); The game is an updated port of the original Carnivores (1998); The iOS version received a score of 79 from Metacritic
Carnivores: Dinosaur Hunter HD Original release date(s): NA: September 10, 2013	Release years by system: September 10, 2013 – PlayStation 3
Carnivores: Dinosaur Hunter HD Original release date(s): NA: September 10, 2013	Notes: Developed by Vogster Entertainment; A sequel in the series, as well as a modern remake of the original Carnivores, with all new graphics; The game received a score of 50 from Metacritic
Carnivores: Dinosaur Hunter Reborn Original release date(s): NA: May 27, 2015	Release years by system: May 27, 2015 – Windows
Carnivores: Dinosaur Hunter Reborn Original release date(s): NA: May 27, 2015	Notes: Developed by Digital Dreams Entertainment; Sequel to Carnivores: Dinosaur Hunter (2010)
Carnivores: Dinosaur Hunt Original release date(s): NA: June 1, 2021	Release years by system: June 1, 2021 – Nintendo Switch, PlayStation 4, Xbox One
Carnivores: Dinosaur Hunt Original release date(s): NA: June 1, 2021	Notes: Developed by Digital Dreams Entertainment; A remaster of Carnivores: Dinosaur Hunter Reborn

== See also ==
- Deer Hunter, another hunting series published by WizardWorks
- Chasm: The Rift, Action Forms' original first person shooter game.
