= Beatshapers =

Ukrainian video game developer

Beatshapers Ltd
- Type: Private
- Industry: Video games
- Founded: 2006; 20 years ago
- Products: #killallzombies, StarDrone Extreme, Carnivores: Dinosaur Hunter, Enigmo, StarDrone Extreme, Wizorb, BreakQuest: Extra Evolution, Jetpack Joyride
- Website: beatshapers.com

Beatshapers Ltd. is a Ukrainian video game developer based in Kyiv. It has rebranded and is now known as Fortell Games as of 2022.

== Fortell Games ==
Fortell Games, Inc. is a Ukrainian-American video game developer based in Kyiv, Ukraine and Santa Monica, CA. It is a spinoff studio of Beatshapers, founded by game industry veteran Alexey Menshikov who previously ran the studio. The company is best known for its unexpected acquisition of the 2012 sandbox game Blocksworld in 2023 and Mixed Reality Game (now in Beta) - Holotanks.

Fortell Games, Inc.
- Type: Independent video game developer
- Industry: Video games
- Predecessor: Beatshapers
- Founded: May 24, 2022; 4 years ago in Wilmington, Delaware, United States of America
- Founder: Alexey Menshikov
- Headquarters: Santa Monica, United States of America
- Brands: Blocksworld; Holotanks
- Subsidiaries: Blocksworld LLC.
- Website: fortell.games

=== History ===
Fortell Games, Inc. was filed and created on 24 May 2022 in Wilmington, Delaware. It headquartered in Santa Monica in August that same year.

=== Acquisition of Blocksworld ===
Fortell first made a splash in late 2023 when rumors started circulating among online fan communities that Linden Lab's 2012 sandbox game Blocksworld had been sold to Fortell Games. The game, originally developed by Swedish company BoldAI AB, had shut down in 2020 after a steady decline over its lifetime. The news caused a stir among Blocksworld's remaining fanbase and generated a following for Fortell Games. On 3 April 2024, a post on Blocksworld's steam community was released by Fortell, announcing a Kickstarter to begin development. The Kickstarter was launched on 2 May 2024. The project achieved its funding goal on 29 May 2024, and on 1 June 2024, it was fully funded by 114.46%.

== Games developed ==
Game	Developer(s)	Publisher	Platform(s)	Date	Ref.
Holotanks	Fortell Games, Beatshapers	Fortell Games	Meta Quest	24 August 2024, full release TBA	
Blocksworld	Fortell Games, Blocksworld LLC	Fortell Games	Steam, iOS (other platforms announced Meta Quest, Android XR, Apple Vision Pro, Android)	TBA	

== Games developed/Own IP ==
- MelodyBloxx (PS minis, cancelled)
- BreakQuest: Extra Evolution (PSP and PS Vita)
- StarDrone Extreme (PS Vita)
- Z-Run (PS Vita)
- Ready to Run (PS4)
- #killallzombies (PS4 and Nintendo Switch)
- RC Soccer (iOS, Android, VR)
- StarDrone VR (PS VR)
- Machines of Madness (Postponed indefinitely)

== Games ported ==
- PlayStation Minis
  - BreakQuest
  - NormalTanks
  - Carnivores: Dinosaur Hunter
  - Enigmo
  - Jane's Hotel
  - Best of Solitaire (for Cosmigo GmbH)
  - Carnivores: Ice Age
  - Galcon Labs
  - Canabalt
  - Wizorb
  - Jetpack Joyride
- PlayStation Network
  - StarDrone
  - Snowy: Treasure Hunter (for Alawar)
- PlayStation Vita
  - StarDrone Extreme
  - Furmins (with Housemarque)
- VR
  - Mission ISS Gear VR (with Oculus/TMUG/Magnopus)
  - Fantastic Beasts VR (with WB/TMUG/Framestore)
  - X8 VR (Thirdverse, Japan)

== Games published ==
- PlayStation Minis
  - BreakQuest (PSP minis launch title)
  - NormalTanks
  - Carnivores: Dinosaur Hunter
  - Jane's Hotel
  - Enigmo
  - Carnivores: Ice Age
  - Galcon Labs
  - Canabalt
  - Wizorb
  - BreakQuest: Extra Evolution
  - Jetpack Joyride
- PlayStation Network
  - StarDrone (PS3 – PS Move launch title)
  - StarDrone Extreme (PS Vita launch title)
  - BreakQuest: Extra Evolution Freemium and PRO edition (PS Vita)
  - Furmins (PS Vita)
  - Z-Run (PS Vita)
  - #killallzombies (PS4)
  - RC Soccer (Apple ARkit, Android Razer Phone exclusive)
  - StarDrone VR (PlayStation VR)

== Awards ==
- Finalist

StarDrone, IndieCade Festival 2011

- Honorable Mention

MelodyBloxx, IGF Mobile 2010

- Developer Dash 2007

PlayFirst's Developer Dash Award 2007

- Semi-Finalist

RC Soccer VR, Global VR Challenge 2016 (China)

- Nominee

StarDrone VR, IMGA Awards 2017 finalist

== Sources ==
- PushSquare interview and Carnivores sequel teaser
- An interview with Beatshapers CEO at PSP Minis
- PlayFirst Developer Dash official press release
- BreakQuest reviews including paper magazines references
- Interview with Beatshapers CEO at PlayStation LifeStyle
- Independent Games Festival Mobile 2010 finalists and honorable mentions
- StartGame interview
- StarDrone official announcement
- Enigmo PlayStation minis announcement
- IndieCade Festival 2011 finalists
- Ready to Run announce on EU PSN blog
- StarDrone VR IMGA 2017 nominee
- StarDrone VR release announce
- Official website
- / PushSquare interview and Carnivores sequel teaser
- An interview with Beatshapers CEO at PSP Minis
- PlayFirst Developer Dash official press release
- BreakQuest reviews including paper magazines references
- Interview with Beatshapers CEO at PlayStation LifeStyle
- Independent Games Festival Mobile 2010 finalists and honorable mentions
- StartGame interview
- StarDrone official announcement
- Enigmo PlayStation minis announcement
- IndieCade Festival 2011 finalists
- Ready to Run announce on EU PSN blog
- StarDrone VR IMGA 2017 nominee
- StarDrone VR release announce
- Holotanks MR announcement
- UploadVR Summer Fest recap with Holotanks and Blocksworld
