= Primal Prey =

2001 video game

- Developer: Sunstorm Interactive
- Publishers: ValuSoft, ARUSH Entertainment
- Platform: Windows
- Release: NA: May 22, 2001
- Genres: First-person shooter Hunting simulation
- Mode: Single player

Primal Prey is a first-person shooter developed by Sunstorm Interactive for Windows. It was published by Arush Entertainment as a downloadable game on May 22, 2001, while ValuSoft published a physical version later that year.

== Gameplay ==
In Primal Prey, the player must hunt dinosaurs across five episodes. Each episode contains several missions that allows the player to either hunt or trap eight dinosaur species and one pterosaur:

- Tyrannosaurus
- Utahraptor
- Troodon
- Gastonia
- Triceratops
- Styracosaurus
- Iguanodon
- Lambeosaurus
- Quetzalcoatlus

A few of the missions allow the player to hunt dinosaurs for trophies. Each mission has its own storyline, and the player has to capture or kill a certain dinosaur, which they can bring back with them for a reward.

== Critical reception ==
GameSpot rated Primal Prey 3.9 out of 10, criticising the single map for being too small to allow the "tracking" game mechanics to be effective, the strange behaviour of the dinosaur's AI, and excessive fog which renders some equipment pointless (such as the sniper scope and night vision goggles). It was also considered graphically inferior to the similar Carnivores series. However, the shrink ray weapon was viewed as the game's one original idea.

Eric Cook of AllGame rated it one and a half stars out of five, criticizing various aspects of the game and calling it a "low-budget copy" of Carnivores. Scott Osborne of GameSpy rated it 55 out of 100, praising the variety of dinosaurs and weapons, while criticizing the "aimless, boring wandering" and "general lack of tension or excitement." He found the presentation "above average, but only by a little, and certainly not enough to really grab you or immerse you in the experience."
