= Innova =

Innova may refer to:

- Innova Capital, a Polish private equity firm
- Innova Capital Partners, an American investment firm
- Innova Discs, a disc golf disc manufacturer
- Innova Disc Golf (video game)
- Innova Junior College, Woodlands, Singapore
- Innova Recordings, a record label
- Toyota Innova, a multi-purpose vehicle/minivan
- Honda Wave series or Innova, motorcycle models
- Innova (album), by Fireflight
- Innova (video game company), Russia
- Innova Solutions International, American employment agency

== See also ==
- Inova Health System
