= Networker =

Networker may refer to:

- EMC Legato Networker, a computer backup software
- Networker (train), a family of multiple unit trains which operate on the UK railway system
- Networker, one of the Non-player characters on My Lego Network
- Networker (album), a 2019 album by American band Omni
