= Carnivores (video game) =

1998 video game

- Developer: Action Forms
- Publisher: WizardWorks
- Producer: Michael Gjere
- Programmers: Oleg Slusar; Artem Kuryavchenko
- Series: Carnivores
- Platform: Microsoft Windows
- Release: NA: December 16, 1998; EU: 1998
- Genres: Sport (hunting); First-person shooter
- Mode: Single-player

Carnivores is a 1998 first-person shooter video game developed by Action Forms and published by WizardWorks for Microsoft Windows. It is the first video game in the Carnivores series of hunting games.

== Storyline ==
Carnivores is set in the year 2190. During an exploration mission in unknown space, a science vessel known as FMM UV stumbled upon a planet with a climate similar to that of Earth, making it suitable for life. The new planet was code-named FMM UV-32. During the initial scouting expedition, the planet was declared inhospitable for colonization due to its unstable terrain and an unexpected abundant population of extraterrestrial organisms that resemble dinosaurs and other prehistoric reptiles. News articles about FMM UV-32 led an Earth corporation to purchase the rights to the planet and to create DinoHunt Corporation, which allowed customers to hunt the planet's dinosaurs.

== Gameplay ==
At the start of a new game, the player is given a choice whether to create a new game or continue playing from a previous account. The aim of the game is hunting dinosaurs to accumulate trophies and earn points which will unlock better weapons and the rights to hunt more diverse species of dinosaurs. A novice hunter starts with zero points, and is only given a shotgun, crossbow and a few starter dinosaurs to hunt, each dinosaur can grant the player a different set of points required to level up. If the player is killed by a dinosaur, all points accumulated on that specific hunt are forfeited. The player must be picked up by DinoHunt to keep the points he earned.

There are three tiers for a hunter, novice, advanced and expert. A hunter will become Advanced after earning 100 points, and Expert with 300. To begin a hunt, the player must choose the location, the weapon, the dinosaur and some hunting accessories which help the player but will deduct the score during that hunt. Each location is unique, with varying difficulties and terrain. The new hunter will be given three areas, with two more added for the Advanced hunter and a final area for the Expert hunter, for a total of six locations. Level locations include jungles, and deserts accompanied by pyramids and an ancient temple.

Next, the player must choose a dinosaur to hunt. A new hunter will be given the choice of four dinosaurs: Parasaurolophus, Stegosaurus, Pachycephalosaurus and Allosaurus. An Advanced hunter gains the ability to hunt the Triceratops and the Velociraptor. Only an Expert hunter can hunt the Tyrannosaurus rex. Harmless creatures such as Moschops, Gallimimus and Dimorphodon are present in each level. They are worth zero points and can be killed with a single shot. The player must also choose a weapon, which can be set for kill or tranquilize for additional points. A beginning hunter can only use a shotgun or a crossbow. A sniper rifle is unlocked upon becoming an Advanced hunter. First time hunters can use the Observation Mode to familiarize themselves with dinosaur behavior and different terrain.

== Development and release ==
Carnivores was developed by Action Forms, using the AtmosFear game engine. In designing the game's dinosaurs, the development team referenced bones, paintings, and the Jurassic Park films. WizardWorks published the game for Microsoft Windows. The game was initially available through WizardWorks' website, followed by a release in retail stores in December 1998.

== Reception ==
Reception

Aggregate score
Aggregator	Score
GameRankings	64%

Review scores
Publication	Score
AllGame	4/5
Computer Games Strategy Plus	3/5
Computer Gaming World	4/5
GameRevolution	B
GameSpot	7.1/10
IGN	7.3/10
PC Gamer (UK)	40%
PC Gamer (US)	69%

The game received mixed reviews according to the review aggregation website GameRankings. Trent C. Ward of IGN praised its dinosaur and environment sounds, but believed that the game was "too damn easy," stating that it was "a surprisingly entertaining game that just doesn't have enough options to keep players busy for the long term." Greg Kasavin of GameSpot praised its sound effects, and its levels for looking "surprisingly authentic," but noted that the game is "tantalizing yet not quite complete to be entirely satisfying."

Tom Chick of Computer Gaming World praised the dinosaurs and environments, but stated that the game can be a little tedious for players who are not into hunting games, although he noted that "This is clearly a game about stalking rather than action". Don St. Jon of GamePro was disappointed by Carnivores as an action game, but stated that it was a "mildly pleasant surprise" as a hunting game. Jon stated that the game showed "its budget status in some ways" such as the minimal weapon and level choices, as well as the repetitive appearance of the environments, but he concluded that the game's action elements "take it a notch above most hunting titles". (Note: GamePro gave the game two 4/5 for graphics and sound, and two 3.5/5 scores for control and fun factor.) GameRevolution praised the realistic appearance and behavior of the game's dinosaurs, as well as the large environments and the graphics, but criticized the game for "long periods of boredom and tedium".

Andrew S. Bub of Computer Games Strategy Plus noted that the game's story was "weak and more than a bit silly," but he praised its graphics, sound, and the "challenging and surprisingly fun" gameplay. Michael L. House of AllGame praised the graphics and the lack of music, writing, "Ambient sounds definitely let you feel as if you've arrived in a prehistoric landscape." House also praised the limited amount of ammunition available on each hunt, stating that it made the game "much more grounded in fact – it just doesn't offer a chance for the undisciplined trigger-happy hunter to blast away at anything that moves without ever running out of ammunition."

== Legacy ==
Carnivores was the first installment in what would become a series. The first sequel, Carnivores 2, was released in 1999, followed by Carnivores: Ice Age in 2001 and Carnivores: Cityscape in 2002. Carnivores: Dinosaur Hunter, the fifth installment in the series and an updated port of the original Carnivores game, was released in 2010. Carnivores: Dinosaur Hunter HD, a sequel in the series and a modern remake of the original Carnivores game, was released in 2013. Carnivores: Dinosaur Hunter Reborn, the seventh installment in the series, was released in 2015, as a sequel to Carnivores: Dinosaur Hunter.
