= Arush Entertainment =

Video game developer

- Formerly: World Entertainment Broadcasting Corp, LLC (1999–2001)
- Type: Private
- Industry: Video games
- Founded: September 1999
- Defunct: July 12, 2005
- Fate: Insolvency of parent company
- Headquarters: Scottsdale, Arizona, United States
- Parent: World Entertainment Broadcasting Corporation (1999–2004); HIP Interactive (2004-2005)

Arush Entertainment was a video game publisher and developer based in Scottsdale, Arizona, United States. It published interactive entertainment software for personal computers and advanced entertainment consoles. Arush published PC and console video games for sale in retail outlets and on the Internet.

== History ==
The company was formed as World Entertainment Broadcast Corp. (WEB) in 1999 and officially revealed in March 2000 by Jim Perkins, formerly at FormGen and the vice president of GT Interactive. The company's initial plan was to publish internet-based games using a "Webisodic" strategy, with each part of the game being released separately at a time. On the same day, the company entered into a partnership with Deer Hunter developer Sunstorm Interactive. In August, WEB Corp secured a license from 3D Realms to produce a Duke Nukem title and signed additional deals with ImaginEngine and Yoboro Productions to publish additional Webisodic games.

On January 22, 2001, WEB Corp. announced that they would change their name to Arush Entertainment. Shortly afterward, Arush published their first Webisodic games through Real.com Games. In August, Arush signed a distribution deal with ValuSoft to release their games physically.

In January 2002, Arush announced that they would release all their titles physically from then on.

In August 2004, Canadian video game company HIP Interactive announced that it had purchased Arush for an undisclosed amount, becoming a subsidiary and inheriting their licenses and upcoming titles.

In 2005, HIP was struggling to pay debts and had defaulted on its second loan due to the many acquisitions it had made, including Arush, and the poor sales of their titles. After a last-minute investment talk fell through, HIP announced on July 12, 2005, that it had declared bankruptcy and ceased operations, including all its subsidiaries. Scott Miller of 3D Realms at the time attempted to acquire the rights to Duke Nukem: Manhattan Project, but was not successful. The current status of Arush's rights is unknown.

== Published games ==
=== PC ===
- Devastation
- Duke Nukem: Manhattan Project
- Emergency 2
- Fear Factor: Unleashed
- Feeding Chloe
- Hunting Unlimited
- Hunting Unlimited 2
- Hunting Unlimited 3
- Monkey Brains
- Playboy: The Mansion
- Primal Prey
- RC Daredevil

=== PlayStation 2 ===
- Fear Factor: Unleashed
- Playboy: The Mansion

=== Xbox ===
- Fear Factor: Unleashed
- Playboy: The Mansion

== Developed games ==
=== PC ===
- Devastation
- Real Pool 2
