= Swamp Buggy Racing =

2000 video game

- Developer: Daylight Productions
- Publisher: WizardWorks
- Producers: Brian Ewoldt; Mark Day
- Designer: Anthony Morone
- Programmer: Anthony Morone
- Composer: George Oldziey
- Platform: Microsoft Windows
- Release: NA: January 2000
- Genre: Racing
- Mode: Single player

Swamp Buggy Racing is a racing video game developed by American studio Daylight Productions and published by WizardWorks for Microsoft Windows. The game was released in the United States in January 2000, and received negative reviews.

== Gameplay ==
Swamp Buggy Racing features four swamp buggy vehicles and two swamp race tracks. The game includes two race modes: single races, and heat races in which two vehicles race each other. The game also includes a practice mode, but lacks a multiplayer option. The vehicles cannot be customized aside from the choice between automatic and manual transmission. The game includes customizable weather effects and three racing views, including an in-car perspective.

== Development and release ==
Swamp Buggy Racing was developed by Daylight Productions, which licensed a 3D game engine by Kalisto Entertainment to create the game. The game was produced by Brian Ewoldt and Mark Day, and was designed and programmed by Anthony Morone. George Oldziey created music for the game.

The game was endorsed by the North American Swamp Racing Association (NASRA), the primary sanctioning body for all swamp buggy races. The game was created to commemorate NASRA's 50th anniversary in 1999, and the game's vehicles are replicas of NASRA's 1999 winning vehicles. WizardWorks published the game in the United States in January 2000, for Microsoft Windows.

== Reception ==
Reception

Aggregate score
Aggregator	Score
GameRankings	21%

Review scores
Publication	Score
AllGame	1.5/5
GameZone	3.5/10
IGN	1.9/10
PC Gamer (US)	6%
Computer Games Magazine	1/5
The Electric Playground	2/10

According to GameRankings, the game has a 21 percent rating. IGN's Erik Peterson criticized the small number of vehicles and tracks, as well as poor controls and frequent bugs. Peterson also criticized the game's music and "indescribably bad hooting and cheering" during races "that sounds like they rounded up the small group of programmers and recorded them in the hallway with a karaoke microphone." Peterson concluded "never, under any circumstance, should you buy or play this game."

Aaron Reed of GameZone criticized the game's lack of options, including no multiplayer, and stated that the game was full of glitches. Reed stated that fog and mist were the only good aspects of the game's graphics, and criticized the game's music, writing that it would only appeal to "southern hillbillies". However, Reed noted that the game was at least "something new and a break in current trends." Steve Bauman of Computer Games Magazine criticized various aspects of the game, including the graphics, the sluggish gameplay, the limited number of vehicles and tracks, and the lack of racing options such as changing the number of laps.

Mark Kanarick of AllGame wrote that Swamp Buggy Racing "has got to be one of the worst games ever created. Ever. Do not take that statement lightly. It is simply the bottom line about this abomination of a 'game.'" Kanarick criticized the game's sluggish response during races, as well as the limited game modes and the "annoying" music. However, Kanarick praised the graphics, which he considered to be the game's only positive aspect, noting that the buggies "look and move cool, and the backgrounds are interesting." Jeff Nash of The Electric Playground wrote that the game "doesn't stack up in the least when pitted against other racers, lacking in visuals, sound, and controls." Nash criticized the minimal vehicle and track selection, and stated that while the game adequately mimicked real swamp buggy racing, it would not be enough to receive the attention of most gamers.

Colin Williamson of PC Gamer stated that even by WizardWorks' "paleolithic standards, this one's a stinker." Williamson believed that the game played more like a game demo due to its limited vehicles and tracks, and criticized the game's poor collision detection, as well as the player vehicle for sometimes abruptly changing its location on the screen. Williamson was also critical of the music and sound, and concluded that the game was one of the most "inexplicably bad pieces of software ever mass-produced for the consumer market. Do not buy it. Do not rent it. Do not even pick up the box." The game's opening scene – in which two swamp buggies are racing, one driven by a man and the other driven by an alligator – received criticism for poor animation.
