= Carnivores: Dinosaur Hunter =

2010 video game

- Developers: Tatem Games (iOS, Android); Beatshapers (PSP, PS3)
- Series: Carnivores series
- Platforms: iOS; Android; PlayStation Portable; PlayStation 3
- Release: iOS; WW: June 12, 2010 (Pro); WW: July 8, 2010 PSP, PS3; EU: August 11, 2010; NA: August 17, 2010 Android; June 2012
- Genre: First-person shooter
- Mode: Single-player

Carnivores: Dinosaur Hunter is a first-person shooter video game and the fifth entry in the Carnivores series. Developed by Tatem Games, it was first released for iOS in 2010 as an enhanced port of the original 1998 Carnivores. Later that year, Beatshapers ported the game to the PlayStation 3 and PlayStation Portable as a part of the PlayStation Minis lineup. In 2012, Tatem Games released the iOS version to Android.

== Gameplay ==
Carnivores: Dinosaur Hunter is an updated port of the original Carnivores (1998) and retains the gameplay mechanics introduced in the first three games in the series. Players can choose from a selection of hunting locations, dinosaurs, weapons, and equipment, while also adjusting the time of day before each hunt. In addition to the huntable dinosaurs, each map is populated by various prehistoric creatures. These animals can be killed, with the exception of the Brachiosaurus, but do not award points. In the PlayStation 3 and PlayStation Portable versions, players can hunt only one selected dinosaur species per environment, while other dinosaurs appear solely as ambient wildlife.

Players begin by hunting herbivorous dinosaurs, which flee when they detect the hunter. Carnivorous species, including Allosaurus and Velociraptor, instead attack on sight. The game features two primary modes: Hunt Mode, in which players select a specific dinosaur to track, and the mobile exclusive Survival Mode, where players defend against successive waves of attacking dinosaurs. 15 dinosaur species are available to hunt, each with different levels of sight, smell, and hearing that affect their ability to detect the player.

The game's arsenal includes two pistols, two shotguns, two rifles, a crossbow, and the option to use nonlethal ammunition. Equipment such as a radar and a dinosaur call can be used to help locate and lure prey.

The iOS version introduced online leaderboards and social networking support, features that were not present in the original Carnivores.

== Development and release ==
Carnivores: Dinosaur Hunter was first developed by Tatem Games for iOS, as a port of the original Carnivores video game. The iOS version was released on June 12, 2010, as a paid "Pro" edition, followed by a free version on July 8. Following its release, Beatshapers developed a PlayStation Portable adaptation based on Tatem Games' iOS port. This version was also compatible with the PlayStation 3.

According to Beatshapers founder and CEO Alexey Menshikov, who had previously worked as an audio designer and sound programmer on the original Carnivores, porting the iOS version to the PlayStation Portable was generally straightforward, although the development team encountered technical challenges related to the system's limited memory. Menshikov stated that accommodating the game's large environments, vegetation, and animated dinosaurs within the PSP's memory constraints delayed development by six weeks. As a result of these limitations, players could hunt only a single dinosaur species per environment. Beatshapers also increased the player's swimming speed, with Menshikov explaining that the original pace was considered too slow during exploration. Development of the PSP version was completed over a period of four and a half months.

Beatshapers' PlayStation Portable version was released in Europe through the PlayStation Store on August 11, 2010, becoming the first Carnivores title to be released for a Sony PlayStation platform. An earlier attempt to bring the series to the PlayStation 2 in 2000 was canceled after difficulties securing approval from Sony. The North American release followed on August 17, 2010, as part of the PlayStation Minis lineup on the PlayStation Store.

At the time of the PlayStation Minis release, Tatem Games was developing a high-resolution version of the game for iPad. Beatshapers founder and CEO Alexey Menshikov also stated that the company was considering versions for the Nintendo 3DS and Android, while discussions with Nintendo regarding a potential WiiWare release had taken place, although no release was expected in the near future.

Tatem Games released an Android port of its iOS version in the United States and Europe in June 2012. The Android release was offered as a free base game, with additional bundles available for purchase that added new dinosaurs, hunting locations, and weapons.

== Reception ==
Reception

Aggregate score
Aggregator	Score
Metacritic	(iOS) 79/100 (PSP) 48/100 (PS3) 30/100

Review scores
Publication	Score
The A.V. Club	(iOS) B
GamesMaster	(PS3) 30%
Jeuxvideo.com	(PSM) 15/20
Macworld	(iOS) 3/5
PlayStation Official Magazine – UK	(PSP) 2/10
Pocket Gamer	(iOS) 4/5
Push Square	(PSP) 5/10

According to the review aggregation website Metacritic, the iOS version of Carnivores: Dinosaur Hunter received "generally favorable" reviews, while the PlayStation 3 and PlayStation Portable versions received "generally unfavorable" reviews. Within two years of its release, the iOS version had been downloaded six million times. The Android version reached 80,000 downloads through Google Play within eight days of its launch.

Reviewing the iOS version, Riordan Frost of Slide to Play criticized the game's difficulty and its "blocky" environments. Andrew Nesvadba of AppSpy wrote that the game's emphasis on realism could limit its appeal to a broader audience, although he praised the controls and described it as an "amazingly detailed title" that was a "true must-have" for hunting game enthusiasts. The A.V. Club noted that the iPhone version allowed players to experience the fantasy of hunting dinosaurs in a modern setting.

Writing for Macworld, Folahan Olowoyeye criticized the iPhone version's story as "ludicrous" and its Hunt Mode as "tedious". He also wrote that the game's graphics failed to take full advantage of the iPhone's hardware capabilities and argued that it should have introduced more new features beyond those of the original 1998 release. Despite these criticisms, Olowoyeye concluded that the game offered "some moments of anachronistic fun."

Damien McFerran of Pocket Gamer gave a positive review of the iPhone version, praising its responsive controls, smooth visuals, and immersive hunting mechanics. He noted, however, that the game's slower, methodical pace could be unappealing to less patient players and criticized its limited replay value after completion. McFerran described the title as "methodical and hugely satisfying" and considered it one of the more "intriguing" action games available on the iPhone, while identifying its primary drawback as a "lack of variety."

Sammy Barker of Push Square reviewed the PlayStation Minis version, criticizing its gameplay as tedious and repetitive. However, he noted that players who enjoyed slower paced shooters might still find some enjoyment in the title.

== Sequels and remakes ==
Carnivores: Dinosaur Hunter HD, a sequel in the Carnivores series and a modernized remake of the original Carnivores (1998), was released exclusively for the PlayStation 3 in 2013.

Carnivores: Dinosaur Hunter Reborn, a sequel to Carnivores: Dinosaur Hunter, was developed and published by Digital Dreams Entertainment and released for Microsoft Windows via Steam on May 27, 2015. Development of the game followed an unsuccessful Kickstarter crowdfunding campaign launched by the company in 2014. Several key members of the original Carnivores development team reunited to work on the project.

A remastered version, titled Carnivores: Dinosaur Hunt, was developed and published by Digital Dreams and released on June 1, 2021, for the Nintendo Switch, PlayStation 4, and Xbox One.
