= Monkey Brains =

2001 video game

- Developer(s): Yobro productions
- Publisher(s): Arush Entertainment
- Platform(s): Windows
- Release: 26 January 2001 (US)
- Genre(s): Puzzle

Monkey Brains is a 2001 puzzle video game developed by Yobro productions for PC. The game follows injured scientist Dr. Simius who attempts to stop the evil Dr. Kreep from using mind-control technology.

== Gameplay ==
Levels are presented from a side-scrolling view, with Dr. Simius controlling a group of monkeys who must perform tasks like pulling levers and pressing buttons while evading traps and enemies in order to progress to the next level. The game's enemies and obstacles present an action component for the game, as a player may have to navigate a monkey though a crushing machine or past flying mines. Only one monkey can be controlled at a time. All hazards in the game are non-lethal, though they will reduce the player's health bar; the game is over when the health bar is depleted. Health can be replenished by collecting fruit.

== Development ==
The game was developed by Yobro Productions, a company founded in 1999.

== Reception ==
While describing it as a bizarre experience, IGN spoke favourably of the game's demo, stating "you really have to play it to believe it, but it's a bunch of nutty fun. "Charles Herold from The New York Times stated that while it was not a "game for the ages, Monkey Brains is an entertaining time waster that can make the hours roll by like minutes." Trey Walker from GameSpot gave the game 5.9 out of 10, concluding: "Overall, Monkey Brains is a game that's suitable for those who like side scrollers but are looking for more puzzles and less action. The graphics and sound are adequate, many of the levels and puzzles can be entertaining, and the game mechanics add a bit of a twist."
