= 911 Fire Rescue =

2001 video game

- Cover art
- Developer: Sunstorm Interactive
- Publisher: WizardWorks
- Platform: Windows
- Release: June 11, 2001
- Genre: first-person shooter
- Mode: single-player video game

911 Fire Rescue is a 2001 video game from WizardWorks. The player takes on the role of a fire-fighter and has to save victims and extinguish several different types of fires in 17 levels. The player must manage their character's health, oxygen and heat levels to avoid dying.

== Gameplay ==
911 Fire Rescue casts the player as a frontline firefighter, tasked with extinguishing blazes and rescuing victims across 17 escalating missions. Using a first-person perspective and traditional WASD controls, players navigate smoke-filled environments—homes, offices, and vehicles—armed with a variety of tools: truck hoses with unlimited water, portable foam sprayers, CO₂ extinguishers, and more. Each fire type—Class Alpha (wood, paper), Bravo (oil, grease), Charlie (electrical), and Delta (metal)—requires a specific suppression method. The Prism3D engine renders dynamic flames and thick smoke that obscure vision and deplete oxygen, encouraging players to crouch low to conserve air. Realistic audio cues include crackling fire and dispatch chatter. Success depends on speed and thoroughness: extinguish all fires, rescue all victims, and avoid injury or suffocation.

== Reception ==
Reception

Aggregate score
Aggregator	Score
Metacritic	48%

Review scores
Publication	Score
AllGame	2.5/5
Computer Games Magazine	2.5/5
GameRevolution	0%
GameSpot	5.8/10
IGN	5.5/10
The Electric Playground	48%

911 Fire Rescue received "generally unfavorable" reviews, according to review aggregator Metacritic.

The Leader-Post said "Still, the game plays well enough; the higher level fires are involving, exciting and challenging enough to make this title worthwhile, just not exceptional"
