= Rocky Mountain Trophy Hunter: Interactive Big Game Hunting =

1998 video game

- Developers: Sunstorm Interactive (PC, Mac); Xantera, Running Dog Software (GBC)
- Publisher: WizardWorks
- Platforms: Microsoft Windows, Mac OS, Game Boy Color
- Release: Windows: NA: April 28, 1998; Mac OS: NA: October 27, 1998; UK: 1998; GBC: NA: September 6, 2000
- Genre: Shooter video game
- Mode: Single player

Rocky Mountain Trophy Hunter: Interactive Big Game Hunting is a video game developed by Sunstorm and published by WizardWorks for Microsoft Windows and Mac OS in 1998.

A Game Boy Color adaptation was developed by Xantera and Running Dog Software and published by Infogrames in 2000.

== Gameplay ==
The game features a selection of game animals that players can hunt including moose, elk, mountain goat, and bear.

== Expansion ==
An expansion pack, Alaskan Expedition, was released that added new weapons and locales. It was later bundled with the main game under the title Rocky Mountain Trophy Hunter: Special Edition Two-Pack.

== Reception ==
Reception

Review scores
Publication	Score
Computer Gaming World	2.5/5
GameRevolution	B
Next Generation	2/5

The PC version received mixed reviews. Next Generation called it "a great example of appealing to an undeserved niche in the market, but a pretty mediocre game."
