= Deer Hunter II: The Hunt Continues =

1998 video game

- Developer: Sunstorm Interactive
- Publisher: WizardWorks
- Series: Deer Hunter
- Engine: Sunstorm Terrain Engine
- Platform: Windows
- Release: October 1998

Deer Hunter II: The Hunt Continues is a 1998 video game from WizardWorks, which was based in Minneapolis, Minnesota. An add-on for the game titled Deer Hunter II: Extended Season was released in May 1999.

== Gameplay ==
In Deer Hunter II: The Hunt Continues, the gameplay pivots into a more immersive simulation of the hunting experience. Players can now walk freely through the terrain, aided by a GPS device that replaces the map screen of the original. This GPS not only tracks location and elevation but also helps navigate the twelve new hunting locales, ranging from Pennsylvania to Georgia, each offering seasonal variations like rut, pre-rut, and post-rut conditions. The game introduces a hunter profile system, allowing users to create and track multiple identities, complete with hit ratios, weapon settings, and a personal trophy room. Weapon selection features nine options from traditional longbows to scoped revolvers and bolt-action rifles, each requiring manual sighting for accuracy. Inventory tools include attractant scents, decoys, calls, and even a scrape dripper, all designed to mimic real-life hunting tactics. Tracking wounded deer includes visible blood trails, scrapes, and droppings guiding the player. The hunter's stamina also plays a role; sprinting too long results in fatigue, slowing movement.

== Development ==
Deer Hunter II was first teased in July 1998. The game was officially announced a month later in August, and was released in October of that year. The title was endorsed by Wildlife Forever, a Minneapolis-based nonprofit organization dedicated to maintaining America's wildlife heritage. A portion of the sales from this game was donated to Wildlife Forever.

== Reception ==
Reception

Review scores
Publication	Score
CNET Gamecenter	7/10
Computer Games Strategy Plus	3/5
Computer Gaming World	4/5
Game Informer	6.75/10
GameSpot	5.8/10
PC Gamer (US)	66%

The game received average reviews. Computer Gaming World said, "Deer Hunter II is a game that, while it won't appeal to the non-hunting, hard-core gaming crowd, is just right for real-life hunters or anyone who wants a fun diversion between work assignments"

== Sales ==
Globally, Deer Hunter II shipped more than 500,000 units within the first month of its release. More than 800,000 units were shipped worldwide by January 1999. According to PC Data, Deer Hunter II was the best-selling game of November 1998, and it was also the best-selling piece of PC software for that month, even beating out the Windows 98 upgrade. Ultimately, PC Data ranked Deer Hunter II as the fifth best-selling game during 1998 in the US.
