= Vivisector: Beast Within =

2005 video game

Vivisector
- Developer: Action Forms
- Publisher: 1C Company
- Engine: AtmosFear
- Platform: Microsoft Windows
- Release: CIS: 30 September 2005; EU: 5 January 2006
- Genre: First-person shooter
- Mode: Single-player

Vivisector: Beast Within or simply Vivisector (in Russia was released as Вивисектор) is a 2005 horror first-person shooter game, was developed by Action Forms and released by 1C only for Microsoft Windows. The game is set in 1987 on a covert military installation on Soreo Island, where a riot has broken out by renegade geneticist Dr. Morhead's experimental human-animal hybrid soldiers. It is the player's job to help the General suppress the riot and regain control of the hybrid soldiers. The game features "vivisection point", which allows the player to remove an enemy's flesh when shot.

== History ==
The game was released in Europe in 2006 and the Commonwealth of Independent States in 2005. It was originally intended to be an entry in the Duke Nukem franchise titled Duke Nukem: Endangered Species, scheduled for release in late 2001. It was largely inspired by the science fiction horror film Island of Lost Souls and the science fiction novel The Island of Doctor Moreau.

== Reception ==
Vivisector: Beast Within received mixed reviews.
