= Galcon 2 =

2014 video game

- Developer: Phil Hassey
- Publisher: galcon.com
- Platforms: Android, iOS, Windows, Mac, Linux
- Release: 2014
- Genres: Action, strategy
- Modes: Single-player, multiplayer

Galcon 2 is a multiplayer real-time strategy video game for Windows, Linux, Mac OS X, Android and iOS created by American indie developer Phil Hassey and released in 2014. Like other games in the Galcon series, it is set in outer space and involves maneuvering fleets of ships to capture enemy planets.

== Gameplay ==
A screenshot of gameplay.

The gameplay is similar to Risk in real time. Each planet that a player owns produces ships for that player. The ships can be used to conquer other planets. There are several different modes of gameplay that can be played with 1-12 players.

Free-For-All
The goal is to capture all enemy planets. The last player alive is the winner.
King of the Hill
The goal is to capture and hold the center planet for a certain time period after which you are declared the winner.
Teams
The goal is to capture all the planets of the enemy teams. There can be two or multiple teams playing against each other.

Other official modes include Empires, Co-op, Eliminator, Billiards, Frenzy and Zap. In addition to the official modes of gameplay, players can make their own modes by modding the game.

== Development ==
The kickstarter for Galcon 2 was launched on December 7, 2012. After being successfully funded, it was released on February 6, 2014. The developer frequently takes input from the players when developing new features for the game.

== Reception ==
Gamezebo gives the game 3.5/5 stars, noting that it is very easy to pick up and play and fun for experienced players, but may be difficult for new players. Pocket Gamer states that the game has surprising tactical depth despite being stripped down to its bare bones. Apple'N'Apps gives the game 2.5/5 stars and says that its space strategy gameplay has withstood the test of time, but isn't catered to multiple skill levels. Galcon 2 was nominated for the 11th International Mobile Gaming Awards for best technical achievement.
