= Omni (band) =

American post-punk band

- Origin: Atlanta, Georgia, United States
- Genre: Post-punk
- Years active: 2011–present
- Labels: Sub Pop; Trouble in Mind
- Members: Frankie Broyles; Philip Frobos; Chris Yonker
- Past members: Doug Bleichner
- Website: omniatl.bandcamp.com

Omni is an American post-punk band from Atlanta. The band currently consists of Philip Frobos on vocals and bass, Frankie Broyles on guitar and keyboard, and Chris Yonker on drums. Broyles was previously a member of Deerhunter and Balkans; Yonker was previously a member of Greenscreen; Frobos was previously a member of Carnivores. Their sound is influenced by post-punk bands like Television, Talking Heads, and Wire, with "mathematical" rhythms and "wiry guitar chords, nervy basslines, and jolting beats."

The band's first album, Deluxe, was released in 2016 on indie label Trouble in Mind Records to positive reviews. Their second album, Multi-Task, followed in 2017 and received positive reviews as well, including a 7.6 rating from Pitchfork.

In 2019, Omni signed to Sub Pop, and released their third album, Networker, later that year. This album was also appreciated by critics. In his review, Chris Ingalls at PopMatters wrote that the band had "managed to pull off the difficult trick of dragging an older, established subgenre into the current musical climate skillfully and effectively." Drew Schwartz from Vice called them "the best post-punk band in America". In 2024, the band released Souvenir, which has also received positive reviews. In 2026, they would release a 10-year anniversary edition of Deluxe, featuring demos of all of the album's tracks along with bonus material.

== Discography ==
- Deluxe (2016)
- Multi-Task (2017)
- Networker (2019)
- Souvenir (2024)
