= Cryostasis: Sleep of Reason =

2008 video game

- Developer: Action Forms
- Publishers: RU: 1C Company; EU: 505 Games; NA: Aspyr; JP: Zoo Corporation
- Designer: Alexander Tugaenko
- Programmer: Stanislav Dmitriev
- Artist: Peter Lysenko
- Composer: Ivan Pogodichev
- Engine: AtmosFear 2.0
- Platform: Microsoft Windows
- Release: CIS: 5 December 2008; EU: 27 February 2009; NA: 24 April 2009; JP: 30 October 2009
- Genre: Psychological horror
- Mode: Single-player

Cryostasis: Sleep of Reason or simply Cryostasis (Ukrainian: Анабіоз: Сон розуму; Russian: Анабиоз: Сон разума) is a 2008 psychological horror video game developed by Action Forms for Microsoft Windows.

== Gameplay ==
The game story develops with help of a unique system called Mental Echo – the ability to penetrate another character's memory and change the actions taken by that character in the past. This can involve saving people's lives by taking over their bodies in their memories and changing the course of history.

The game, being set in an arctic setting, employs body heat as a health meter – the player must use heat sources (such as lights or stoves) to replenish health. The gameplay is from a first person perspective.

== Plot ==
Cryostasis takes place in 1981 on an Arktika-class nuclear-powered icebreaker called the North Wind near the North Pole. The main character, Alexander Nesterov, is a Russian meteorologist who was supposed to board the ship for a lift home after completing a tour of duty at the pole; however he finds it's been shipwrecked since 1968 and its dead crewmen have undergone bizarre metamorphosis. Through the game the character finds fragments of Maxim Gorky's fairy tale The Flaming Heart of Danko, which parallels what happened to the ship and its crew.

The game starts with Alexander approaching the North Wind on a dog sled. The ship's horn sounds, and the ice all around starts to break; he falls down through but the bottom ice is thick enough that he doesn't end up in the water. He then enters the ship by following one of the dogs.

From flashbacks and Mental Echo the ship's tragic past is put together. The captain took a perilous course through the ice, ignoring the warnings of his first officer, who placed his faith in the latest ice-detecting instrumentation, in favour of his own instinct and seagoing experience. The ship collided with an iceberg and suffered significant damage. The first officer reported the captain's mistake when sending a report to the HQ; in return, the HQ responded that the North Wind, which had already been considered long in the tooth, would be decommissioned upon returning to port. The ship's security officer, knowing that the message will break the captain, warned the first officer to not relay it to him. However, trying to take revenge for the captain's disdainful attitude, and hoping for rapid promotion, he did. The demoralized captain took it to his old friend, the chief engineer; however, tired and frustrated, the chief engineer also dismissed him. Whilst the ship was undergoing repairs, it gradually became trapped by the shifting ice.

After a few weeks, in an attempt to regain the respect of his crew and to finally break free of the ice, the captain decided to ram the encircling ice at full speed. However, he was wounded during the ramming when thrown off balance, and the ramming attempt was then stopped by both the security officer and the first officer, who threw the ship into full reverse, giving the dangerous "back, emergency" order. As a result of this the engine room caught fire and the nuclear reactor core destabilized; as the crew subsequently began to slowly die from cold, malnutrition and radiation poisoning, the first officer, security officer and chief engineer tried to escape in a helicopter with the wounded Captain, abandoning the doomed ship and the rest of her crew. As the helicopter took off, the ship's nuclear core finally failed, engulfing the ship (and the airborne helicopter, which was directly above it) with a mysterious energy force, turning the ship and its crew into the monstrous, ghostly form encountered by Nesterov.

Throughout the game, the main character comes across fallen crew members and has a chance to correct their mistakes by taking control of their actions in the past using the Mental Echo; as he does so, elements of the backstory of the ship change multiple times. For example, in the unmodified back-story, the outraged crew managed to bring down the escaping helicopter during take-off, and its wreckage remained on deck to the present day – after Nesterov goes back and corrects certain actions, in the altered back-story the helicopter successfully clears the pad and its wreckage consequently vanishes from the present, clearing a path for him. However, throughout the game, Nesterov is never able to access the corpses of the three officers responsible for the catastrophe itself, either because they were on another part of the ship he cannot reach, or because they successfully escaped from the ship on the helicopter and are no longer there, and so he is unable to prevent the original tragedy.

At the end of the game, having drawn his attention by repeatedly meddling with history, a battle with Chronos, the personification of time, ensues. With Nesterov victorious, Chronos rewards his efforts by allowing him to choose to use Mental Echo on one of the three missing officers, and hence avert the entire tragedy. Possessing the first officer, he may choose not to give the decommissioning note to the Captain and instead go to help the crew with repairs; by possessing the chief engineer, he can sympathize and cheer up the Captain when he arrives with the message from HQ; by possessing the chief of security, he can choose not to support the first officer when he tries to stop the Captain from ramming the ice, instead helping the wounded Captain, whose ramming effort then succeeds.

After the final flashback, the character is returned to the beginning of the game. The dog sled sequence starts the same, but when Alexander is about to fall down the cliff, he is saved by the Captain, who, together with the first officer, the chief of engineering and the chief of security, leads him aboard the North Wind; now intact and free of ice.

== Development ==
The game is the first to make use of Nvidia PhysX real-time water physics as displayed in a tech demo of the game engine.

== Reception ==
Reception

Aggregate scores
Aggregator	Score
GameRankings	68.43%
Metacritic	69/100

Review scores
Publication	Score
Eurogamer	6/10
G4	4/5
GameRevolution	B+
GameSpot	8/10
IGN	6/10

Cryostasis has received mixed reviews. It received an aggregated score of 68.65% on GameRankings and 69/100 on Metacritic. GameSpot awarded the game 8 out of 10, saying "Flashes of frozen brilliance help this cold-blooded horror game overcome its technological flaws...few horror games elicit chills as well as Cryostasis." Eurogamer was slightly more critical, awarding the game 6 out of 10 and stating that "it's not quite creative enough – its environments fall into a monotony of samey rooms and bulkheads – and its combat is too clunky to be delicious." IGN gave the game 6 out of 10, stating "Cryostasis benefits from the developer's creative intentions and has some very intriguing elements. The setting is spooky, the time-travel bits are engaging, and the overall vibe scores big in the traditional components of fright. On the other hand, the mystery doesn't unravel quickly enough to keep players interested and the overall progression of the game is restrictively linear. Quibbles about the relative temperature of light bulbs and campfires aside, the heat element of the game is a very creative idea that adds tension and tone to the game."

=== Awards ===
Cryostasis received several awards during KRI in 2006 and 2007.

- KRI 2006 – "Best technologies"
- KRI 2007 – "Best game graphics"

Cryostasis also became the winner of GameSpot's Special Achievement Award 2009 in the Best Story nomination.
