= Carnivores: Cityscape =

2002 video game

- Developer: Sunstorm Interactive
- Publisher: Infogrames
- Producers: Michael Gjere; Peter Eckert; Troy Buckley; William Vaughan
- Programmer: Pepper Lain Miller
- Artist: Todd Marshall
- Composer: Gary Phillips
- Engine: Serious Engine
- Platform: Microsoft Windows
- Release: NA: March 26, 2002
- Genre: First-person shooter
- Modes: Single-player; multiplayer

Carnivores: Cityscape is a 2002 first-person shooter video game developed by Sunstorm Interactive and published by Infogrames for Microsoft Windows. It is the fourth installment in the Carnivores series, following Carnivores: Ice Age. Unlike earlier entries in the series, which focus primarily on hunting prehistoric animals in natural environments, Carnivores: Cityscape features a more urban setting and introduces a greater emphasis on combat-oriented gameplay.

== Storyline ==
The plot expands upon the storyline established throughout the Carnivores series, presenting a conflict between humans and dinosaurs for survival. The story centers on DinoCorp, a corporation dedicated to providing affluent clients with exclusive hunting experiences. After discovering a remote planet populated by dinosaur species closely resembling those that once inhabited Earth, DinoCorp capitalized on the discovery by establishing a specialized hunting program that attracted wealthy patrons seeking encounters with prehistoric creatures.

Overtime, however, declining interest in the hunting program resulted in reduced participation and financial losses. In an effort to revitalize its operations, DinoCorp initiated a new project designed to introduce dinosaurs to a broader audience across Earth colonies. To accomplish this, the company commissioned a large scientific vessel transport to carry numerous dinosaur species for display.

The initiative was disrupted when the vessel crashed near a remote colony, releasing its cargo of dinosaurs and creating a widespread threat to the local population. Faced with the resulting crisis, DinoCorp recruited specialized agents to contain and neutralize the escaped creatures.

== Gameplay ==
Unlike previous entries in the Carnivores series, Carnivores: Cityscape allows the player to choose between two different game modes; the "Agent" and the "Dinosaur". Agents are equipped with ranged weapons, along with some tactical equipment. Weapons include a standard handgun with infinite ammunition, a shotgun, a sniper rifle, an assault rifle, an "X-Rifle", and a grenade launcher. The Agent features both night-vision and thermal sensing goggles.

The game features only five playable dinosaurs, including Coelophysis and Oviraptor. The game's larger dinosaurs include Nanotyrannus and Suchomimus. Giganotosaurus is the game's strongest dinosaur, but also the slowest. Dinosaurs have no ranged weapons; only their claws and a lunge. Dinosaurs can also activate a "Dino-Vision", which acts much like a combination of both of the Agent's visors; it allows the dinosaur to see in dark areas and highlights foes in thermal readings. Three creatures roam each level, but do not harm the player: Alphadon, Tapejara, and Tylosaurus.

Levels include wilderness, a city, and a subway. As an Agent, the player must complete missions such as travelling to the crashed ship, and rescuing people, including a mayor and subway workers. As a dinosaur, the player must kill all the Agents in each level.

== Development and release ==
Carnivores: Cityscape was developed by Sunstorm Interactive using the Serious Engine, which allowed for the inclusion of multiplayer, as well as large outdoor environments and a high quantity of dinosaurs. The game's producers were Michael Gjere and Peter Eckert of Infogrames, and Troy Buckley and William Vaughan of Sunstorm Interactive. The lead programmer was Pepper Lain Miller, and the lead artist was Todd Marshall. The game's sound and music was created by Gary Phillips. The development team worked with an expert who designed the game's dinosaurs to ensure their realism. The game was published by Infogrames for Microsoft Windows, and was released in the United States on March 27, 2002, after being completed earlier that month.

== Reception ==
Reception

Aggregate score
Aggregator	Score
Metacritic	56/100

Review scores
Publication	Score
GameSpot	5.2/10
GameSpy	58/100
GameZone	6.9/10
IGN	6.5/10
PC Gamer (US)	20%
The Electric Playground	6.5/10

According to Metacritic, the game received "mixed or average reviews".

Ivan Sulic of IGN wrote that without reading the game's instruction manual, "it will seem as if the game just kind of begins out of nowhere. Even the most story devoid titles have some text before they start." Sulic also criticized the game's minimal selection of "bland" weapons, some of which he considered to be "terribly modeled." Sulic also criticized some of the game's graphics as well as the artificial intelligence, and wrote, "Attempting to spruce up the monotony of casual play by incorporating rescue missions (escort the loser) was a terrible, wrong, awful idea."
