= Souvenir (Omni album) =

Studio album by Omni
- Released: February 16, 2024
- Studio: The Farm (Vienna); Sampson Sound (Atlanta); Standard Electric (Atlanta)
- Genre: Post-punk
- Length: 30:43
- Label: Sub Pop
- Producer: Omni; Kristopher Sampson

Omni chronology
Networker (2019)	Souvenir (2024)

Souvenir is the fourth studio album by American post-punk band Omni, released on February 16, 2024, through Sub Pop. It was produced by Omni and Kristopher Sampson, and received acclaim from critics.

== Critical reception ==
Professional ratings
Aggregate scores
Source	Rating
Metacritic	85/100
Review scores
Source	Rating
Mojo	4/5 stars
PopMatters	8/10
Uncut	8/10

Souvenir received a score of 85 out of 100 on review aggregator Metacritic based on seven critics' reviews, indicating "universal acclaim". Uncut called it "an instantly engaging, 11-track set with zip, heart, sly humour and real staying power, which shucks off the often dry terseness of the genre without trashing its template", while Mojo stated that "it's over in a flash, an exhilarating fairground ride you won't want to disembark". PopMatters' Alison Ross found that "the slightly sleeker sound (with a new producer) suits them very well. We certainly don't want to go all Rick Rubin on Omni, but it turns out a somewhat polished production brings out the emotion in this heretofore stoic band".

== Track listing ==
All lyrics are written by Philip Frobos; all music is composed by Frankie Broyles and Philip Frobos.

Souvenir track listing
No.	Title	Length
1.	"Exacto"	2:39
2.	"Plastic Pyramid" (featuring Izzy Glaudini)	3:25
3.	"Common Mistakes"	1:49
4.	"Intl Waters"	2:54
5.	"Double Negative"	2:40
6.	"PG"	2:31
7.	"Granite Kiss"	2:36
8.	"Verdict"	2:05
9.	"F1"	2:49
10.	"To Be Rude"	3:19
11.	"Compliment"	3:56
Total length:		30:43

== Personnel ==
Omni

- Frankie Broyles – guitar, piano, synthesizer, production, artwork
- Philip Frobos – bass, vocals, production
- Chris Yonker – drums, synthesizer, production

Additional contributors

- Kristopher Sampson – production, mixing, engineering, photography
- Dave Cooley – mastering
- Izzy Glaudini – additional vocals on "Plastic Pyramid", "Verdict", and "F1"
- Kyle Gordon – photography
