= BreakQuest =

2004 video game

- Developers: Nurium Games; Beatshapers (PS Mini)
- Publishers: Stardock; Nurium Games; Red Marble Games; Beatshapers (PS Mini)
- Platforms: Windows, Mac OS X, PlayStation Portable
- Release: Windows: WW: November 15, 2004; Mac OS X: WW: July 4, 2005; PSP: EU: October 1, 2009; NA: March 18, 2010
- Genre: Breakout clone
- Mode: Single-player

BreakQuest is a multi-platform brick buster game created by Spanish studio Nurium Games, later ported to Mac OS by Red Marble Games. It was released on November 16, 2004, and was published by Stardock as part of TotalGaming.net. A PSP Minis version developed and published by Beatshapers released in Europe/Asia with the launch of the PSP Go on October 1, 2009. It was later released in the North America region for PSP Go on March 18, 2010. It was released for free in 2016.

== Plot ==
A large corporation rules the world by making thousands of TV channels and shows for people to watch. All of humanity becomes addicted, resulting in a widespread loss of human intelligence. The player has to activate a transmitter to stop the satellite signals in an attempt to end the corporation's rule.

== Gameplay ==
There are two modes of play: Arcade and Quest. Quest is basically a "campaign mode", where the levels are played in order, while in Arcade, the goal is to beat random levels as fast as possible. The game includes a physics engine. The engine enables all the objects in a level to interact with each other in a simulated physics environment.

=== Power-ups ===
BreakQuest features over 50 power-ups, referred to as Capsules by their pill-formed shape. These are casually released by the elimination of obstacles, but can also be granted at certain times, or simply spawn at the beginning of specific levels. Capsules can assist the player by providing weapons that help clear the levels faster, but may also increase the difficulty by changing the shape and behaviour of the ball and the bumper. Aside from the safety block and bonus ship Capsules, the player can also acquire reserve balls by collecting enough stars from star Capsules. If the only ball in play is lost, the reserve ball will launch automatically. However, the player is also given the choice to launch any number of reserve balls in-game at any time, with the penalty that a Ship will be lost if there are no balls or reserve balls left in play.

=== Levels ===
The 100 levels available in the game have each been designed with their own theme, realised with distinct sound and visual effects, also utilizing some features of the physics engine. Once a level has been completed, the player will be granted a Key to permanently unlock it on the level select screen. However, the collected Key will only apply for the specific difficulty mode that the player has chosen; hence a Key will have to be collected for each level in every difficulty mode, in order to make them available from the level select screen for each respective mode.

=== Gravitator ===
Another notable element in BreakQuest is the Gravitator, which can be used to attract any balls towards the bottom of the screen. With sufficient skill, it can be used to guide a ball towards a specific block. This alleviates the difficulty of hitting the last block in a level, a problem present in many breakout games. Unfortunately, since Gravitator attracts toward the screen bottom, not the ship itself, it cannot be used to curve a ball traveling perfectly vertically, such as the initial shot at the beginning of every level.

== Ports ==
The PlayStation mini version was developed and published by Beatshapers, features some modifications (according to developer's interview): levels are modified to fit PSP widescreen resolution, some levels are simplified to make a game playable because of performance issues. Also custom editable Arcade mode also has been removed, only preset modes (Beginner, Minimal, Fast, Armageddon, etc.) left in PlayStation version.

== See also ==
- Breakout clone
- Arkanoid
