= Action Forms =

Ukrainian video game developer

Action Forms Ltd.
- Company type: Private
- Industry: Video games
- Founded: 1995; 31 years ago
- Founders: Igor Karev; Yaroslav Kravchenko; Oleg Slusar; Denis Vereschagin
- Defunct: 2011
- Fate: Dormancy
- Headquarters: Kyiv, Ukraine
- Products: Chasm: The Rift; Carnivores series

Action Forms Ltd. was a Ukrainian video game developer based in Kyiv.

== History ==
Action Forms was founded by art director Yaroslav Kravchenko, lead programmer Oleg Slusar, executive director Igor Karev, and deputy director Denis Vereschagin. Krevchenko and Slusar had been "addicted" to the game Doom and wanted to develop a similar game. After commencing work on a game engine for their game, Tron: The Hammer of War, they brought in Karev and Vereschagin and formed Actions Forms in Kyiv in 1995. Tron: The Hammer of War was eventually renamed Chasm: The Rift and released in 1997. Subsequently, the company earned recognition as developer of the first three games in the Carnivores series. The company used its own game engine AtmosFear in every released game since Carnivores. In 2005, Vivisector: Beast Within and «Остров Сокровищ» (Ostrov Sokrovisch) based on the Soviet animated film Treasure Island, which itself was based on the novel of the same name by Robert Louis Stevenson, were released. In 2008, Cryostasis: Sleep of Reason, which uses modified game engine AtmosFear 2.0, (though it was actually the fourth major generation of the engine) was released. Since 2011, Action Forms is currently dormant. Main members of the company created the game development studio Tatem Games, focused on games for iOS platform and revived the Carnivores franchise.

== List of games ==
- Chasm: The Rift (1997)
- Carnivores (1998)
- Carnivores 2 (1999)
- Carnivores: Ice Age (2001)
- Duke Nukem: Endangered Species (cancelled)
- Ostrov Sokrovishch (Остров сокровищ aka. Treasure Island, based on the 1988 animated film Treasure Island) (2005)
- Vivisector: Beast Within (2005)
- Adventures of Captain Wrongel (Announced 2006. Cancelled in 2009. UA title: Пригоди капітана Вронгеля. Based on the animated series Adventures of Captain Wrongel.)
- Cryostasis: Sleep of Reason (2008)
- Carnivores: Dinosaur Hunter (2010) (iOS, PlayStation Portable) (in collaboration with Tatem Games)
- Adventures of Talking Tom (cancelled project in 2010/with Outfit7)
- Carnivores: Ice Age (2011) (iOS) (in collaboration with Tatem Games)
- Mowgli's Adventures (cancelled project in 2011)
