= Enigmo =

- Developers: Pangea Software, Beatshapers (PlayStation Minis)
- Publishers: Pangea Software, Beatshapers (PlayStation Minis)
- Platforms: Windows, Mac OS X, Mac OS 9, iOS, PSP, Windows Phone 7
- Release: Mac OS 9' Mac OS X 2003; Windows; 2003 iOS; 2008; PlayStation Minis; 2010; Windows Phone 7; 2011
- Genre: Puzzle
- Mode: Single-player

Enigmo 2
- Developer: Pangea Software
- Publisher: Pangea Software
- Platforms: PC, Mac OS 9, Mac OS X, iOS
- Release: Mac OS X Mac OS 9; 2006 iOS; 2009
- Genre: Puzzle
- Mode: Single-player

Enigmo and Enigmo 2 are respectively 2.5D and 3D arcade-style computer games for Windows, Mac OS 9, Mac OS X, iOS and PlayStation Minis developed by Pangea Software. They both involve moving certain substances into their proper containers. The music in both games was recorded by Michael Beckett.

Enigmo was created in 2003 by Pangea Software and was their most successful game ever sold at the time. The graphics are three-dimensional, in a sense; but gameplay is strictly limited to the horizontal and vertical axes. Liquids (water, oil, and lava) fall from droppers and will bounce around the walls of a mechanism. Gameplay consists of manipulating a limited number of dynamic items (such as bumpers, sliders, accelerators, and sponges) to affect various streams of flowing liquid so that the droplets reach their destination: tanks specific for each liquid. The player wins the level when all tanks on the level are filled with 50 drops of the appropriate liquid. In addition to the pre-designed levels, players can create their own using the game's built-in editor and download others for free off of the Pangea website.

In 2004, Aspyr Media ported a 2003 release of Enigmo to the Windows Mobile platform. This version was included with the Dell Axim x50v model PDA.

In January 2011, a version of Enigmo was released in the PlayStation Store as a PSP Mini, developed and published by Beatshapers.

In May 2011, a version of Enigmo was released for Windows Phone 7.

== Sequel ==
Enigmo 2 was introduced in February 2006, and expands upon the basic principles set down by the original. Water is still a substance that can be manipulated, but lava and oil were swapped for laser beams and plasma particles. The game adds the dimension of depth to gameplay, and many solutions involving rotating the camera or objects in three dimensions. The graphics were also improved. The game takes place in outer space, specifically near Earth, Mars, Saturn, and asteroids, but gravity functions as it would on earth. Like the original, each container must have 50 units to be considered full. When all containers are simultaneously full (they lose their contents over time), the player wins the level.

== iOS releases ==
During WWDC 2008, it was announced that an iOS version of Enigmo was in development and would be available for purchase for the price of US$9.99 at the launch of the App Store. The game makes use of the iPhone's multi touch interface and is controlled entirely via touch. Players can use the swiping and pinching actions to zoom and pan and use their fingers to position the puzzle pieces. The game was voted the "Best iPhone Game" at WWDC '08 and has been met with very positive reviews in the App Store. Originally including only 50 levels, the iOS version of Enigmo has been updated to allow user designed levels created on the desktop versions of the game. The mobile versions of Enigmo were made available in Dutch, German, Spanish, Japanese, Italian, and French, with JR Language Translations providing the localisations of the game.

=== Enigmo 2 for iOS ===
On September 2, 2009, Pangea Software released Enigmo 2 for the iPhone. It is very similar to the Macintosh version, although it uses multi-touch to control. On September 24, it was updated to support the Retina Display and the iPad. As of 2011 it costs $2.99 and is available from the App Store.
