= WizardWorks =

American video game developer

WizardWorks Group, Inc.
- Company type: Subsidiary
- Industry: Video games
- Founded: August 21, 1980; 45 years ago
- Defunct: March 29, 2004
- Fate: Dissolved by parent
- Headquarters: Minneapolis, Minnesota, U.S.
- Area served: North America
- Number of employees: 19 (2004)
- Parent: Atari, Inc. (1996–2004)

WizardWorks Group, Inc. was an American video game developer and publisher based in Minneapolis, Minnesota. The company was founded in 1980 and, in 1993, WizardWorks opened the CompuWorks and MacSoft divisions. In 1996, WizardWorks was acquired by GT Interactive to become part of their GT Value Products umbrella, which was later abandoned. Through acquisitions, GT Interactive became Atari. On March 29, 2004, Atari, Inc. closed down all operations of WizardWorks, and folded outstanding projects into their publishing branch in Beverly, Massachusetts.

== Games published ==
- 911 Fire Rescue
- Advanced Dungeons & Dragons: Collectors Edition
- Beach Head 2000
- Blake Stone: Aliens of Gold
- Carnivores
- Carnivores 2
- Carnivores Ice Age
- Casper
- Championship Pool
- Chasm: The Rift
- Claw
- D!ZONE
- Damage Incorporated
- Deer Hunter
- Deer Hunter 2: Monster Buck Pack
- Deer Hunter 2
- Deer Hunter 3 Gold
- Deer Hunter 3
- Deer Hunter 4
- Deer Hunter 5: Tracking Trophies
- Dirt Track Racing: Sprint Cars
- Dirt Track Racing: Australia
- Dirt Track Racing
- Duke: Nuclear Winter
- Duke: The Apocalypse
- Duke!ZONE
- Duke!ZONE II
- Duke Assault
- Duke Caribbean: Life's a Beach
- Duke it out in D.C.
- Duke Nukem II
- Duke Xtreme
- Emergency: Fighters for Life
- Fun Pack 3D
- H!ZONE for Hexen and Heretic
- Hell to Pay
- Harley-Davidson: Race Across America
- In Pursuit of Greed
- Innova Disc Golf
- Kristi Yamaguchi Fantasy Ice Skating
- Leadfoot
- Montezuma's Return
- Ozzie's Forest
- Perdition's Gate
- Phantasie III: The Wrath of Nikademus
- Q!ZONE
- Rudolph's Magical Sleigh Ride
- Robot Arena
- Rocky Mountain Trophy Hunter
- S!ZONE (City pack for SimCity and SimCity 2000)
- Secret of the Silver Blades
- Skunny
- Sporting Clays
- StarCraft: Retribution
- Stargunner
- Swamp Buggy Racing
- T-MEK
- Treasures of the Savage Frontier
- W!ZONE
- X-Men: The Ravages of Apocalypse
