= Networker (album) =

Studio album by Omni
- Released: November 1, 2019
- Genre: Post-punk
- Length: 31:44
- Label: Sub Pop
- Producer: Omni

Omni chronology
Multi-Task (2017)	Networker (2019)	Souvenir (2024)

Networker is the third studio album by American post-punk band Omni, released on November 1, 2019, through Sub Pop. It received positive reviews from critics.

== Critical reception ==
Professional ratings
Aggregate scores
Source	Rating
Metacritic	77/100
Review scores
Source	Rating
Exclaim!	7/10
Pitchfork	6.5/10
PopMatters	8/10
Q	3/5 stars
Uncut	8/10

Networker received a score of 77 out of 100 on review aggregator Metacritic based on 10 critics' reviews, indicating "generally favorable" reception. Q felt that there is "a pleasing mundanity to their lyrical scope", while Uncut stated that "it's all very wry, but rather endearingly so". Ryan Haughey of Exclaim! found that the album "presents new ideas and tones to the choppy, distant and sparse sounds that emanate from a post-punk scene that draws inspiration from bands like Television".

Chris Ingalls of PopMatters stated that Omni's change of labels "seems to have clearly energized the duo, as the meticulous nature of the compositions and arrangements becomes apparent from the very start", writing that the band "enjoys delving into rich lyrical subject matter while keeping musical arrangements layered and unpredictable". Pitchfork's Abby Jones wrote that "Omni's layered influences amount to a complex and absorbing churn, but here, the band sounds a bit depthless; frenzied guitar riffs can only evoke so much when there's so little stylistic variation between them".

== Track listing ==
Networker track listing
No.	Title	Length
1.	"Sincerely Yours"	2:45
2.	"Courtesy Call"	3:46
3.	"Moat"	1:58
4.	"Underage"	3:34
5.	"Skeleton Key"	3:41
6.	"Genuine Person"	2:43
7.	"Present Tense"	3:29
8.	"Blunt Force"	1:34
9.	"Flat Earth"	2:53
10.	"Networker"	1:52
11.	"Sleep Mask"	3:29
Total length:		31:44
