= Galcon =

- iPhone app icon
- Developer: Phil Hassey
- Publisher: galcon.com
- Platforms: Android, iOS, webOS, Microsoft Windows, Mac, Linux, browser, PSP
- Release: iPhone OS: July 12, 2008
- Genres: Action, strategy
- Modes: Single-player, multiplayer

Galcon is a series of real-time strategy video games for Android, iPhone, webOS, Windows, Linux, Mac OS X and Flash, which were developed by Phil Hassey. It is set in space and involves maneuvering fleets of ships to capture enemy planets.

== History ==
The Galcon series was inspired by Galactic Conquest by Rick Raddatz, a text-based multiplayer computer game released in 1987. This game was based on a game called Stellar Invasion by Bearbyte Software.

Galcon Classic was released for the desktop in late 2006 for Ludum Dare, a game development contest. It was then developed into a more advanced video game. Galcon Classic features dozens of single-player game modes and full multiplayer.

In July 2008, Galcon was publicly released on InstantAction, a web browser game platform released by GarageGames. This is the first time Galcon was released with campaign sort of gameplay.

A couple months later, Galcon was released for the iPhone, frequently called iGalcon by fans. iGalcon was one of the first true multiplayer experiences for the iPhone but never gained enough publicity to kick off. iGalcon comes with multiple single-player modes featuring varying degrees of bot difficulty, and an advanced online multiplayer system where players can battle in rooms up to four.

In June 2009, Galcon Flash was released. Galcon Flash was a Flash port of Galcon and closely resembled the iPhone port. Although Galcon Flash was given a small introductory price, the number of registered users was very small; however, there is a limited demo version.

Galcon Labs was released in early October 2009. Galcon Labs is a sequel to the first iGalcon. Galcon Labs features four new modes which are both singleplayer and multiplayer compatible. Galcon Labs has been received as a very positive addition to the Galcon series.

On February 11, 2010, Galcon Fusion was released for Mac and Windows as the latest addition to the Galcon family. It is the desktop and tablet equivalent to Galcon Labs and the original Galcon.

The kick-starter for Galcon 2 was launched on December 7, 2012. After being successfully funded it was released for iOS on February 6, 2014. Galcon 2 is available for cross platform play on phones, tablets, and PC. It features many new modes of gameplay.

== Gameplay ==
Players start with 1-3 large "home planets" and send off ships to conquer other planets around them. The numbers on each planet indicate how many ships it will take to conquer them. The numbers on a player's own planet indicate the number of ships that their planet holds. Each planet a player owns produces ships for that player with more ships at a faster rate produced depending on the planet's size. Players can select what percentage of the ships to send from a planet and players can redirect ships in mid-flight. The aim of the game is to defeat the other player(s) by eliminating all of the enemy planets.

Galcon 2 uses a ranking system based upon the Elo rating system.

== Reception ==
Galcon Classic received good reviews and won multiple awards. Both iPhone Galcons received excellent reviews, but there was a smaller publicity angle. The InstantAction version was given few public reviews, but the overall rating is high. Galcon Flash also did not receive very many reviews, and mostly failed in the popularity.

== Other offshoots ==
In the fall of 2010 Galcon was used by the Google AI Challenge as a basis for the contest problem. For the contest participants wrote programs that competed in a simplified version of the game.

Another modern game implementing the idea behind Galactic Conquest is the FOSS game GNUlactic Konquest from the kdegames package. The Solarmax series is also based upon this concept.

As of 2018 there are multiple clones of Galcon available on mobile platforms.
