= Innova Disc Golf (video game) =

2000 video game

- Developer: Sundial Interactive
- Publisher: WizardWorks
- Producers: Dan Hilton; Peter Armstrong
- Platform: Microsoft Windows
- Release: NA: April 12, 2000
- Genre: Sports
- Modes: Single-player, multiplayer

Innova Disc Golf is a sports video game developed by Sundial Interactive and published by WizardWorks for Innova Discs. It was released for Microsoft Windows on April 12, 2000.

== Gameplay ==
Innova Disc Golf is played from a first-person perspective. The game is based on disc golf, which plays similarly to regular golf except that the player uses flying discs and aims them at baskets located on the course. The game features four courses, each with 18 baskets. The player can choose to play a full 18 baskets, or just the front 9 or back 9 baskets.

The game includes 11 types of discs with different characteristics, each one made by Innova Discs. Some discs fly long and straight, while others curve to the left or right, avoiding hazards such as trees. Some discs are designed for short ranges near the baskets. The player can select the strength, height, tilt, and direction of the disc throw. An overhead map allows the player to track the flight of the disc after it is thrown. A mulligan option allows the player to retake a throw if desired. The game has various multiplayer options, including LAN.

== Reception ==
Reception

Review scores
Publication	Score
AllGame	2/5
CNET Gamecenter	3/10
GameZone	4.5/10
IGN	3.3/10
PC Gamer (US)	19%
The Washington Times	2.5/5

Innova Disc Golf received generally negative reviews. Gil Alexander Shif of GameZone wrote, "Only in the most basic sense is the game fun." He considered Innova Disc Golf to be an "uncreative and unsatisfying" recreation of the sport, and a "mediocre effort." Gordon Goble of CNET Gamecenter stated that the game "provides only a marginally entertaining experience that lacks much of the thrill of the actual sport". Mark Kanarick of AllGame wrote, "Though fun at times, Disc Golf stands as an average game at best." IGN's Scott Steinberg stated that with no computer-controlled opponents to compete against, "it's inherent that the only competition is your score." Steinberg further stated, "Trying to perfect one's technique is a lofty, but downright boring goal."

Steinberg also criticized the multiplayer option, writing that "the chances of finding a buddy that owns the game, let alone wants to play it, are slim to none." Shif stated that the only way to play an online multiplayer game "is if you know someone else who happens to be interested in disc golf and wouldn't mind sitting through a few hours of repetitive play." Scott Silverstein of The Washington Times complained of the game's limited options and courses, and wrote that the game "tends to lose some of its novelty with its repetitiveness." Goble praised the variety of discs and the numerous ways to throw them, but he considered the game unrefined. Shif stated that the system for aiming and throwing discs was "clunky", while Kanarick considered it difficult. Kanarick also stated that players would have no choice but to use the mulligan option repeatedly because the discs "perform so unexpectedly at times".

The graphics were generally criticized. Steinberg wrote that the courses suffered from "an alarming lack of detail." Goble considered the graphics outdated and wrote that the game was "not ugly per se, but the environments are motionless aside from your flying disc". Goble also criticized the game's "unconvincing sense of depth that'll have you questioning whether an object is 100 or 500 yards away." Shif described the courses as "relatively featureless and unexciting", stating that their environments were stagnant. Silverstein described the graphics as "just OK". Kanarick praised the simple graphics, writing that the backgrounds "are nice enough to maintain interest but not too detailed as to take away from the gameplay."

Shif considered the sound to be the game's weakest element, especially the player commentary. Silverstein also considered the sound to be possibly the worst aspect of the game, stating that it "is practically nonexistent most of the time except for a couple of chirping birds. And when the golfers speak, it's usually something stupid". Steinberg considered the commentary "annoying" and unemotional. Colin Williamson of PC Gamer wrote, "The only thing that makes the game worth playing – but only once – is the amazingly bad commentary." Kanarick criticized the sound effects and player commentary, calling them both "too repetitive and annoying."
