= Chasm: The Rift =

1997 video game

- Developer: Action Forms
- Publisher: Megamedia
- Platforms: MS-DOS, Windows, Nintendo Switch, PlayStation 4, PlayStation 5, Xbox One, Xbox Series X/S
- Release: MS-DOS; October 21, 1997; Windows; October 10, 2022; Nintendo Switch, PlayStation 4, PlayStation 5, Xbox One, Xbox Series X/S; May 18, 2023
- Genre: First-person shooter
- Modes: Single-player, multiplayer

Chasm: The Rift (also known as Chasm: The Shadow Zone) is a first-person shooter video game developed by Ukrainian studio Action Forms and published by Megamedia Corporation in 1997 for the MS-DOS operating system. The game is set across various locations, including military bases, ancient Egyptian tombs, medieval settings, and an alien world. Players assume the role of an elite soldier tasked with single-handedly combating evil forces that infiltrate from the past and future through temporal portals.

Development of the game, initially titled Tron: The Hammer of War, began in the mid-1990s by a group of students from Kyiv Polytechnic Institute, inspired by Doom from id Software. The development process extended over several years, during which the game's title, script, and graphics underwent changes. The publisher was found through the internet: United States–based Megamedia Corporation took on publishing the game.

Chasm: The Rift received generally positive reviews from critics, who praised its detailed monsters, weapon design, and certain technical features. However, the game's simple level design and somewhat unoriginal gameplay prevented it from competing with more prominent first-person shooters of the era. In 2022, 25 years after its initial release, Chasm: The Rift was re-released for Windows with improved graphics and controls. In May 2023, it was ported to Nintendo Switch, PlayStation 4, PlayStation 5, Xbox One, and Xbox Series X/S.

== Gameplay ==
Chasm: The Rift is a first-person shooter set across various locations spanning different epochs and worlds, including modern military bases, ancient Egyptian tombs, medieval castles, and alien landscapes. Each time period and world comprises several levels. Players take on the role of an elite soldier tasked with single-handedly combating evil forces infiltrating through time portals from the past and future. The primary objective is to locate and destroy these portals.

The player's arsenal in Chasm: The Rift includes several weapons. The primary weapon is a rifle with unlimited ammunition, suitable for long-range combat. More powerful options include a shotgun and a Volcano machine gun, which require ammunition. The game also features futuristic energy weapons such as the BladeGun, which launches discs, and the ArrowGun, which fires energy bolts. However, these advanced weapons have limited ammunition. The game includes a weapon similar to a rocket launcher, but it is less effective due to its low fire rate and potential for self-harm in narrow corridors. The most powerful weapon is the Dimension Detonator, which functions similarly to the BFG from Doom, affecting a large area and dealing massive damage to all enemies within range. Its use is limited by scarce charges and the risk of self-destruction in confined spaces.

Gameplay consists of firefights in narrow, maze-like levels. Enemies possess high firepower, necessitating constant player movement and use of cover. A notable feature is the ability to shoot off different body parts of monsters, who continue fighting even with severed limbs. In addition to regular enemies, boss battles conclude each episode, requiring specific tactics to defeat them. The narrative unfolds through briefings and radio communications between non-player characters between levels. The game offers both single-player and multiplayer modes.

== Development ==
Chasm: The Rift originated from the efforts of two Kyiv Polytechnic Institute students, Yaroslav Kravchenko and Oleg Slyusar, who were inspired by Doom. Seeking to create their own first-person shooter, they began developing a project initially called Tron: The Hammer of War. The scope expanded when Igor Karev and Denis Vereshchagin joined the team, transforming it into a potential commercial venture. Global Ukraine company provided early support, while the developers utilized the Internet to attract investments. During development, the game underwent substantial revisions, including changes to its title, script, and graphics. The developers used online platforms to promote the game, attracting interest from American companies. Megamedia Corporation, which had previously collaborated with Ukrainian studio Meridian-93, eventually became the game's publisher.

In October 2022, 25 years after its initial release, Chasm: The Rift was re-released for Windows. SNEG Ltd., a small company specializing in re-releases of older games, handled the publishing. This updated version introduced support for modern screen resolutions and minor improvements while preserving the original gameplay and graphical style. In May 2023, the game was ported to contemporary gaming systems, including Xbox One, Xbox Series X/S, PlayStation 4, PlayStation 5, and Nintendo Switch. These versions feature several enhancements aimed at improving playability on modern platforms, such as 4K resolution support and gamepad-optimized controls.

== Reception ==
Reception

Aggregate score
Aggregator	Score
GameRankings	62.18%

Review scores
Publication	Score
Destructoid	6.5/10
GameRevolution	C+
GameSpot	6.1/10
PC Gamer (US)	56%
The Adrenaline Vault	3.5/5
Gamezebo	3/5
Génération 4	2/6
Game.EXE	88%
Game World Navigator	6.0/10
Svet Kompjutera	83%

Critics generally praised Chasm: The Rift for its detailed monsters with dismemberment mechanics, well-designed weapons, and technical features such as rain effects and destructible environments. However, they also noted that the game fell short of contemporaries like Quake due to its overly simplistic level design, which featured an abundance of narrow corridors that restricted player movement. The multiplayer mode faced criticism for its inconveniences and inability to compete with more prominent titles of the era.

A reviewer of the Game.EXE magazine praised Chasm: The Rift, but noted its lack of 3D accelerator support. The reviewer highlighted the game's monster design and animation, localized damage system, "well-developed" enemy AI, "interesting" door and switch mechanics, and "excellent" weapon animations as strengths. However, the main criticism was directed at the game's "entirely flat", Doom-style levels, which the reviewer felt undermined many of Chasm: The Rift's technological achievements and would be immediately noticeable to experienced players. Nevertheless, the reviewer noted that the game's shortcomings were understandable and justified, and that the overall product was cohesive. Ultimately, the author ranked Chasm: The Rift as one of the best shooters at the time of its release, second only to Quake and Hexen II, and on par with Jedi Knight and Turok. Despite some flaws, the reviewer noted that he appreciates the game for its style and "polished" execution. Calvin Hubble, in his review for GameRevolution, disagreed with this assessment. He wrote that Chasm failed to compete not only with Quake and Hexen II but also with Jedi Knight. While acknowledging the game's "innovative" enemies, "neato" visual effects, and atmospheric effects, Hubble criticized it for a basic engine that did not support 3D accelerators and "doesn't stand up" to older Build engine games like Duke Nukem 3D, Blood and Shadow Warrior.

Alexander Landa, in his review of Chasm: The Rift for Game World Navigator, noted the game's clear similarities to Quake in level, weapon, and monster design, but highlighted its significantly higher difficulty due to powerful enemies and a scarcity of health packs. Landa criticized the levels as overly simple and narrow, limiting the player's ability to maneuver. However, he praised the detailed monster animations and the ability to shoot off body parts. The reviewer emphasized the game's low system requirements despite its advanced graphical effects. The multiplayer mode was deemed unplayable due to level design issues and lack of modem support. Ultimately, Landa characterized Chasm: The Rift as a contradictory "middle-of-the-road" title, combining outdated level design with modern graphics. He concluded that the game would appeal to "hardcore" genre fans who had exhausted their interest in Quake, but might be too specific and challenging for casual players.

In a review for The Adrenaline Vault, Emil Pagliarulo noted that despite its confusing plot, the story of Chasm: The Rift "works well within the context of game". Pagliarulo particularly praised the detailed enemy models with dismemberment mechanics and the game's high-quality graphics without 3D acceleration. However, he criticized the game for overly dark level textures and cumbersome mouse controls. Additionally, he suggested that while multiplayer is doesn't have "much of a draw", the game's strength lies in its "solid" single-player experience. Michael Luton, in his review for PC Gamer, acknowledged some "impressive" graphic effects and detailed monsters but concluded that the game fell short of Quake due to its flat level design, "clumsy" mouse controls, and lack of comprehensive online multiplayer functionality. Ultimately, Luton recommended Chasm only to the most devoted genre fans willing to overlook the game's shortcomings. Similarly, a reviewer for the Serbian magazine Svet Kompjutera observed that despite the quality engine and visual effects, the game contains "technical defects" and that "the ingenuity is at absolute zero."

PC Games' Peter Olafson called the game a "very pleasant surprise," describing it as a "lively, artful, and surprisingly original stew with bits and pieces from other games." He wrote that while Chasm is "a sort of id smorgasbord" borrowing elements from Quake, Doom, Duke Nukem 3D and Hexen, the game "focuses on things that really work". A GameSpot reviewer characterized Chasm: The Rift as "another cookie-cutter" shooter compared to its market competitors, targeting users with 486-based computers and occupying a middle ground between Doom and Quake. While noting that the game's engine was not cutting-edge and its gameplay was somewhat derivative, the reviewer highlighted several interesting features. These included rain effects, breakable windows, destructible light sources, and highly detailed monsters with limb dismemberment capabilities, albeit limited to one limb per enemy. The reviewer found the player's arsenal to be "dull", suggesting it seemed entirely borrowed from Terminator: Future Shock. Similarly, a critic from the French magazine Génération 4 described the weapons as "banal" and the levels as "traditional."

=== Re-release ===
In a review of the 2022 re-release, Zoey Handley from Destructoid noted that Chasm: The Rift was often labeled as a "poor man's Quake" and categorized as "Eurojank". She felt that despite a solid combat system featuring fast and powerful weapons, as well as detailed enemy dismemberment, the game fell short of Quake and other contemporary shooters due to overly simplistic level architecture, lack of vertical design, and narrow corridors that limited mobility. Nevertheless, Handley praised the developers' extensive work in modernizing the engine for the re-release. A Gamezebo critic, reviewing the Switch port, highlighted the game's "engaging" combat with enemy dismemberment but noted that it suffers from outdated design and navigation issues. The reviewer concluded that the game would primarily appeal to enthusiasts of first-person shooter history.

== Links ==
- Chasm: The Rift at MobyGames
