= Game World Navigator =

Russian magazine and website dedicated to video games

- The 135th issue, August 2008
- Editor-in-chief: Igor Boyko
- Categories: Video Games
- Frequency: Monthly
- First issue: January 1997
- Company: Navigator Publishing
- Country: Russia
- Based in: Moscow
- Language: Russian
- Website: nim.ru
- ISSN: 1680-3264

Game World Navigator (Russian: Навигатор игрового мира) is a Russian video game magazine founded in 1997. Initially focused exclusively on PC games, it became known for long-form analysis, detailed reviews, and technical coverage. Igor Boyko has served as editor-in-chief for most of its history and has remained the publication's central editorial figure.

The magazine began with small-scale production but expanded rapidly in the late 1990s, becoming the first Russian gaming magazine to exceed 200 pages. It targeted experienced PC players, particularly strategy and online game audiences, and developed an analytical, pragmatic style shaped by contributors with technical backgrounds. Economic downturns and the growth of online media reduced print circulation in the 2000s-2010s, leading to a temporary suspension and a 2013 relaunch that broadened coverage to consoles, mobile games, and video formats.

Content has been dominated by reviews and previews, supplemented by industry analysis, historical features, and extensive PC hardware testing. The magazine was noted for unusually detailed benchmarks, thematic sections, multimedia cover discs, and recurring editorial devices such as the "Gamer" mascot persona. Although originally committed to a strict "PC only" policy, it later adopted broader platform coverage while maintaining an emphasis on in-depth criticism.

The magazine is one of the longest-running surviving Russian gaming magazines among with Igromania and Strana Igr country's major gaming publications. It influenced the development of Russian games journalism through expanded hardware coverage, early MMORPG reporting, and multimedia supplements. As of the 2020s, it continues to publish reduced-frequency print issues alongside active online and video platforms.

== History ==
Game World Navigator is a Russian video game magazine first published in 1997. The magazine was founded by Igor Boyko, Denis Davydov, and Sergey Zhuravsky. The founders met while working on game guidebooks for the publisher Aquarium and decided to launch an independent gaming magazine. Boyko became the editor-in-chief in 1998 and since then has permanently remained in the role long-term. Davydov devised the magazine's name, early structure, and its mascot character "Gamer".

The first issues were produced in modest conditions, including a rented apartment and later a basement office, with a very small staff and minimal budget. Staff often worked up to 20 hours per day and sometimes lived in the editorial office due to lack of funds. The first print run sold out quickly and attracted a PC gaming readership. Despite limited editorial experience and financial instability, the magazine grew rapidly, reaching 192 pages by summer 1997 and up to 224 pages at its peak. It was the first Russian gaming magazine to exceed 200 pages. Game World Navigator developed a loyal audience of hardcore PC gamers, particularly fans of strategy video games and MMORPGs.

Many early contributors were enthusiasts rather than professional journalists. Early contributors were often recruited through personal contacts and networking, then trained in-house. Many early authors came from technical backgrounds or military service. Staff members were older than typical game journalists, often over 25 and sometimes over 40. This influenced the magazine's analytical and pragmatic style. Authors also sometimes wrote under recurring fictional personas to create recognizable voices. Staff turnover is low, and many contributors have worked with the magazine for over 15 years.

In an interview, Boyko explains that new authors for the magazine were admitted only through submission of a trial article for evaluation of written work, demonstrating knowledge of games and strong command of Russian. He explains that the magazine preferred original, author-driven articles over strictly formulaic review templates, although admits that template style reviews were unavoidable as a temporary stage for inexperienced writers. Boyko attributed the magazine's longevity to the dedication and cohesion of its editorial team.

The 1998 Russian financial crisis negatively affected the magazine. Conflicts with the publisher over missed deadlines and resources led to Davydov's departure along with several staff members. In the early 2000s, declining sales and competition from the internet caused the magazine to expand coverage to consoles to maintain relevance. The 2008 financial crisis and the rise of internet media severely reduced print circulation. By 2011, the print run had fallen by roughly half. The website and forum stagnated, and many veteran writers left due to delayed payments. Boyko temporarily left to work for another company. The magazine was largely frozen during 2012, leading to closure rumors.

A full relaunch was announced in October 2012 and implemented in January 2013. Igor Boyko returned as editor-in-chief. The "PC only" policy was abandoned, and coverage expanded to video game consoles and mobile games. The company established advertising and commercial departments and improved financing. A video studio, new website, and YouTube channel were launched. From 2014 to 2022, the magazine continued as a thin print edition, while its main revenue and content output shifted to a YouTube channel, including news and author programs. The YouTube channel features news, themed programs, and interviews. A new television program also titled Game World Navigator aired on several cable channels.

Presently, the magazine continues to publish print issues, though less frequently than in its peak years. It is one of the very few Russian print gaming magazines that has continued publishing into 2020s. The modern print edition is smaller, about 100 pages, and releases about eight issues per year. Most major reviews are written specifically for print rather than reprinted from the website. It maintains active online platforms and emphasizes video content.

== Content ==
The overall structure of Game World Navigator was similar to other Russian gaming publications of the time. The magazine largely followed standard review-and-news formats but also included distinctive analytical and historical sections. The editorial approach combined criticism, consumer guidance, and cultural commentary on games and employed numerical evaluation systems typical of gaming journalism.

The magazine's style emphasized detailed coverage, reader participation, and long-form analysis, continuing traditions from earlier publications like Velikiy Drakon. It distinguished itself through analytical and thematic sections rather than only reviews and walkthroughs. The magazine combined journalism with essays and occasional literary content, which differentiated it from purely review-focused competitors. The magazine published practical guides and long-form analytical articles, video game industry problems, history of game companies, and overviews of video game genres.

In the mid-2000s, the magazine cultivated an image of experienced, "hardcore" specialists rather than youth-oriented writers. The tone of the magazine was often aimed at veteran players rather than younger audiences than its competitors.

The magazine had several recurring sections and columns. A section discussed current issues in the video game industry and broader market trends. A section covered cancelled or unreleased games and development projects that never reached publication. It also highlighted overlooked MS-DOS games. The Hardware section offered unusually extensive reviews and benchmarks of PC components, often 10-20 pages per issue, which was considered unusually detailed for a print gaming magazine of the period. The May issue each year was traditionally themed around the World War II. The magazine also published reader fiction, essays on related topics such as science fiction and tabletop RPGs, and comics.

From the early 2000s, about 15 pages per issue were dedicated to online multiplayer games and esports. Issues often allocated 15-20 pages specifically to reviews and coverage of online games during the rise of MMORPGs. Boyko's detailed reports from Ultima Online introduced many Russian readers to the MMORPG genre. At a time when internet access in Russia was still limited and expensive, and such coverage provided rare information for players. The magazine popularized narrative "field report" on-the-ground style style coverage of online worlds that emphasized player experiences.

Game World Navigator initially focused exclusively on PC games and adopted the motto "PC Only & Forever". The magazine positioned itself and focused exclusively on PC games, unlike competitors that covered consoles. At the time, it was unusual in Russia for a game magazine to ignore consoles entirely, and the strict PC-only stance became part of the magazine's brand identity. For many years it deliberately avoided console coverage and treated consoles humorously or critically. Between roughly 2000 and 2004, the magazine frequently criticized consoles and predicted the decline of console gaming. Some early articles portrayed consoles as technologically inferior and harmful to game design and industry progress. In later years, this position softened and the magazine adopted a more balanced view toward consoles.

In the interview, Boyko expressed belief that print magazines received preferential treatment from the industry, including better artwork and invitations to press tours. He explains that the magazine maintained working relationships with publishers, developers, and PR agencies. Staff would attend major international industry events such as E3 and Gamescom. The magazine regularly conducted interviews and obtained exclusive materials and artwork.

One of the magazine's unique features among peers was a recurring mascot named "Gamer". Davydov wrote many texts under the Gamer persona and additional pseudonyms. Gamer inserted comments, jokes, and opinions directly into articles, and "interacted" with readers through footnotes and marginal comments. This gave the publication a conversational and self-aware editorial tone. A dedicated section called "Gamer's Zone" later featured essays written from the mascot's perspective and responses to reader feedback. After Davydov left the editorial team, the mascot disappeared and the section was rebranded.

The magazine's editorial stance emphasized Russian history and domestic developers. The magazine frequently published interviews with local developers and covered local projects that other outlets ignored. The magazine actively promoted Russian game developers and critiqued unrealistic portrayals of Russia in foreign games. Domestic games often received slightly higher scores than in competing publications and the magazine was informally regarded as patriotic Russian gaming publications.

An analysis of the magazine, concluded that reviews constitute the dominant genre in the magazine's content structure. Between 76% and 85% of all published materials in the magazine consisted of reviews of video games. In sampled issues, between 65% and 84% of total pages were devoted to the "Preview" and "Review" sections.

It was also the first magazine to include two CDs, and later two DVDs, with issues. Issues sometimes included physical extras such as model kits, calendars, or magnets.

== Legacy ==
Game World Navigator is the oldest surviving gaming magazine still published in Russia. It was part of the "big three" Russian gaming magazines, alongside Igromania and Strana Igr. It is one of the few long-running Russian print gaming magazine that survived multiple market crises and relaunches. Despite multiple editorial crises, a temporary suspension, and a later relaunch, it has continued operating to the present day. It outlived many contemporaries during the transition from print media to online gaming journalism, while many other Russian gaming magazines closed in the 2000s-2010s. Domestically, the publication is regarded as a living legacy of Russian games journalism rather than a defunct historical title.

It was considered as a flagship example of specialized gaming journalism in Russia. It was considered a pioneer in several game journalism practices, and helped professionalize games journalism in Russia. It coined the term "igrozhur" (portmanteau of "game" and "journalist") influencing subsequent magazines and digital outlets. The magazine introduced new editorial formats, deep hardware analysis, and early coverage of online gaming. It played an early role in professionalizing Russian game journalism, expanding hardware coverage, pioneering MMORPG reporting, and experimenting with large-format issues and multimedia supplements. It built a dedicated PC-gaming readership and influenced how games were evaluated and discussed in Russian media. The magazine is frequently cited in academic research as a representative and influential publication within the Russian gaming media sector.

In 2014, Igor Boyko became the first Russian games journalist invited to serve on the jury of Gamescom. In the same year, the magazine's review scores began being tracked by the review aggregator Metacritic. These developments increased the publication's international visibility.
