= Carnivores 2 =

1999 video game

- Developer: Action Forms
- Publishers: WizardWorks, Infogrames
- Series: Carnivores series
- Platform: Microsoft Windows
- Release: NA: October 21, 1999; EU: 1999
- Genres: Sport (hunting), first-person shooter
- Mode: Single-player

Carnivores 2 is a first-person shooter video game developed by Action Forms and published by WizardWorks in North America on October 21, 1999. It is the sequel to the 1998 video game Carnivores and is the second in the Carnivores series.

The source code became available on Assembla in 2013.

== Gameplay ==
The DinoHunt Corporation continues to allow people to hunt dinosaurs on the planet FMM UV-32. After further exploration of the dinosaur planet, more islands have been opened to a growing number of customers.

Gameplay is similar to the original Carnivores, with some changes. At the start of the game, the player must register a hunter or continue with a saved hunter. The point of the game is similar to the previous Carnivores game: the player must hunt dinosaurs to get trophies and accumulate credits. A new hunter is given 100 credits. The player uses credits to select a hunting area, a dinosaur to hunt and a weapon to use. Levels include a forest, a jungle and a swamp; weapons include a pistol, a shotgun, a crossbow, and a sniper rifle. Each dinosaur, area, and weapon has its own cost; the player's remaining credits determine what the player can and cannot bring on the hunt. The dinosaurs that are available to hunt, from the lowest to the highest price, are the Parasaurolophus, Ankylosaurus, Stegosaurus, Allosaurus, Chasmosaurus, Velociraptor, Spinosaurus, Ceratosaurus, and Tyrannosaurus rex. When the player chooses an item from the menu, other selections may become unavailable depending on the amount of remaining credits. Available selections are highlighted in blue, selected items are yellow and unavailable items are gray.

The player can easily have several dinosaurs to hunt, with several weapons selected at the same time as he advances in his hunting skills. As the player hunts the selected dinosaurs, each successful kill will result in a number of credits added to the player's account. The player can kill more than one dinosaur per hunting expedition, allowing him to earn enough credits to move into more advanced areas with more expensive weapons and more dangerous dinosaurs. However, if the player is killed by a dinosaur, all credits accumulated on the specific hunt are forfeited. The player must be evacuated by DinoHunt and survive the hunt to keep the credits he earned. There are various methods of increasing or decreasing the credits per dinosaur.

When the player kills or tranquilizes a dinosaur, he receives credits that are dependent on the type of dinosaur and on his selected equipment usage. For example, killing a dinosaur that was not selected in the menu will give only half of that dinosaur's total available credits. Tranquilizing rather than killing a dinosaur will increase the player's credits per hunt by 25 percent. Hunting accessories such as camouflage and a dinosaur-detecting radar can be used during hunting, but will deduct points if utilized. First time hunters can use the Observation Mode to familiarize themselves with dinosaur behavior and different terrain.

Each dinosaur will react to a hunter differently depending on its nature. Some are more adept at detecting the player's scent, while others may see him in the distance, or hear his footsteps. Once a dinosaur takes note of the player, a number of reactions can happen. Herbivores may run away or attack the player if they feel cornered. Carnivores may attack the player head on, or gather in an organized pack to flank the player and take him out. Regardless of which dinosaur the player is hunting, there are others that do not appear on the radar that can launch a surprise attack. Harmless ambient animals appear on every hunt but cannot be selected from the main hunting menu. These are the Moschops, Gallimimus, Dimorphodon, Pteranodon, and Brachiosaurus. They are worth zero points and can be killed with a single shot, excluding the Brachiosaurus, which cannot be killed.

== Reception ==
Reception

Aggregate score
Aggregator	Score
GameRankings	67%

Review scores
Publication	Score
AllGame	3.5/5
CNET Gamecenter	6/10
Computer Games Strategy Plus	3.5/5
EP Daily	7.5/10
GameSpot	7.3/10
IGN	7.3/10
PC Gamer (US)	60%

The game received average reviews according to the review aggregation website GameRankings. Greg Kasavin of GameSpot praised its "carefully detailed and almost disturbingly lifelike" dinosaurs, as well as the creatures' convincing, hypothetical noises.

Marc Saltzman, writing for IGN and The Electric Playground, praised its dinosaur animation and realistic environments, but criticized the A.I. as one of the game's major weaknesses, saying: "Very rarely did I feel like I was being hunted by the beasts themselves – one of the main reasons why you'd play this game instead of another. Even while constantly running and not using any camouflage, carnivore attacks were extremely rare. I would've liked the option to hunt smarter, tougher beasts." Andrew S. Bub of CNET Gamecenter praised the improved graphics and additional features in the sequel, but criticized the A.I. and stated that the game could have been better. Bub also wrote that it takes too long to gain the ability to hunt larger dinosaurs such as the T. rex, stating that this "feels like an artificial attempt to extend the game's longevity and results only in frustration."

Benjamin E. Sones of Computer Games Strategy Plus praised the large environments but was critical of the dinosaur A.I. Sones concluded that the game was fun for a while but he believed that players would likely become tired of the game long before they gain sufficient points to hunt larger animals. Li C. Kuo of PC Gamer praised the graphics, atmosphere and dinosaurs, but noted some graphical glitches and criticized the limited weapon choices. Kuo concluded that it was one of the better hunting games available at the time.

Christopher Michael Baker of AllGame stated that Carnivores 2 was "almost exactly the same" as its predecessor aside from new weapons, landscapes and dinosaurs, writing, "If you were to look at screenshots of the two side by side, actually, you might not even be able to tell the difference. And WizardWorks didn't even bother to change the opening menu screen! [...] In essence, Carnivores 2 is more of an expansion disc than a sequel." Baker considered the game's sound to be the most impressive part of the game. He also praised the graphics but noted that they were nearly identical to the game's predecessor.
