= Championship Pool =

1993 video game

- NES cover art
- Developer: Bitmasters
- Publisher: Mindscape
- Designers: Franz Lanzinger and David O'Riva
- Programmers: Franz Lanzinger and David O'Riva
- Artist: Greg Hancock
- Composer: Jerry Gerber
- Platforms: NES, SNES, Game Boy, Mega Drive/Genesis, MS-DOS
- Release: October 1993
- Genre: Sports simulation – pool
- Modes: Single-player, multiplayer

Championship Pool is a 1993 sports simulation video game released for Nintendo Entertainment System, Super Nintendo Entertainment System, Game Boy, Mega Drive/Genesis, and MS-DOS. The pool (pocket billiards) game was developed by Bitmasters and released by Mindscape. The game was officially endorsed by the Billiard Congress of America.

== Gameplay ==
The game is a straightforward, virtual version of pool, and includes several games: eight-ball, nine-ball, three-ball, ten-ball, fifteen-ball, straight pool (14.1 continuous), rotation, equal offense, and speed pool. The player may play against the computer or up to seven other players using the same console using the "Party Pool" (multiplayer) option. Other gameplay modes include "Tournament" (single-player, computer opponents), "Freestyle" (players make up own game rules), and "Challenge" (single-player, shot practice).

== Development ==
Championship Pool was designed and programmed by Franz Lanzinger and David O'Riva. The music was done by Jerry Gerber, who also composed music for The New Adventures of Gumby and Gumby: The Movie. The game was released in North America in October 1993 for the NES, and November 1993 for the SNES.

== Reception ==
Reception

Aggregate score
Aggregator	Score
GameRankings	70.75% (SNES); 40% (GB)

Review score
Publication	Score
IGN	4/10 (GB)

Electronic Games gave the SNES version 89%. French magazine Joypad gave the SNES game 86%.
