= Deer Hunter (series) =

- Developers: Southlogic Studios, Glu Mobile, Sunstorm Interactive, Coresoft, Sorrent (now Glu Mobile), Morning Star Multimedia, Sylum Entertainment
- Publisher: Atari, Glu Mobile: Previous publishers: WizardWorks, MacSoft, Sorrent (now Glu Mobile), Vatical Entertainment
- Platforms: Microsoft Windows, Macintosh, PlayStation 2, Game Boy Color, Mobile phone, BlackBerry, iOS, Android
- First release: Deer Hunter: Interactive Hunting Experience; November 13, 1997
- Latest release: Deer Hunter Classic; November 22, 2013

Deer Hunter is a series of deer hunting simulation video games. Originally available for Windows platform published by WizardWorks, it has since been published on MacOS, Game Boy Color, PlayStation 2, and mobile phones. The first Deer Hunter game was an early success in the casual game market.

The original game was released in November 1997. In 2003, Southlogic Studios was commissioned by Infogrames to develop Trophy Hunter 2003; and because of Trophy Hunter's success, they took over the development of the Deer Hunter franchise, with Deer Hunter 2004 and Deer Hunter 2005, released after Infogrames rebranded as Atari. Glu Mobile acquired the entire franchise in April 2012.

Gameplay usually takes place in a thick forest or meadow during different seasons of the year. Animals and objects other than deer can be seen while playing, including Bigfoot and UFOs in some incarnations, but these serve no purpose other than scenery. Some animals may be shot and killed, but the player receives no trophy and will be penalized if the animal was a protected species. In the latest versions, players can also manage a deer herd with deer growth and genetics deciding the traits of offspring.

The franchise's main line games are: 1997's Deer Hunter, 1998's Deer Hunter II, 1999's Deer Hunter 3, 2000's Deer Hunter 4, 2001's Deer Hunter 5, 2002's Deer Hunter 2003, 2003's Deer Hunter 2004, 2004's Deer Hunter 2005, and 2008's Deer Hunter Tournament. After the release of Deer Hunter Tournament, every game bearing the franchise's name has been a mobile version, and there has not been a full-fledged game since; however, some of these versions have seen ports on Steam, to poor reviews.

== Games ==
Game	Details
Deer Hunter Original release date(s): NA: November 13, 1997	Release years by system: 1997—Windows; 1998—Macintosh; 1999—Game Boy Color
Deer Hunter Original release date(s): NA: November 13, 1997	Notes: Developed by Sunstorm Interactive and published by WizardWorks; Released a year later by MacSoft for the Macintosh system; Released for the Game Boy Color in 1999. It was developed by Morning Star Multimedia and published by Vatical Entertainment; It includes 3 different hunting locations, 3 weapons and 5 different accessory items; A version was planned to be released for the Game.com by Tiger Electronics but was cancelled
Deer Hunter Companion Original release date(s): NA: September 30, 1998	Release years by system: 1998—Windows
Deer Hunter Companion Original release date(s): NA: September 30, 1998	Notes: Published by WizardWorks; It is an expansion pack for Deer Hunter: Interactive Hunting Experience; Contains the Deer Hunter Companion book and an add-on CD-ROM which has five new hunting locations, videos and tips
Deer Hunter II: The Hunt Continues Original release date(s): NA: October 31, 1998	Release years by system: 1998—Macintosh, Windows
Deer Hunter II: The Hunt Continues Original release date(s): NA: October 31, 1998	Notes: Developed by Sunstorm Interactive and published by WizardWorks; It is the sequel to Deer Hunter: Interactive Hunting Experience; It was developed using SCS Software's TERRENG engine and has 20 accessories and 30 weapons.
Deer Hunter's Extended Season Original release date(s): NA: May 13, 1998	Release years by system: 1998—Windows
Deer Hunter's Extended Season Original release date(s): NA: May 13, 1998	Notes: Developed by Sunstorm Interactive and published by WizardWorks; It is the second expansion pack for Deer Hunter: Interactive Hunting Experience; It adds three new stages and a Black Powder Muzzleloader
Deer Hunter II: Extended Season Original release date(s): NA: December 31, 1998	Release years by system: 1998—Windows
Deer Hunter II: Extended Season Original release date(s): NA: December 31, 1998	Notes: Developed by Sunstorm Interactive and published by WizardWorks; It is the expansion pack for Deer Hunter II: The Hunt Continues; It adds monster mule deer, 12-gauge slug shotgun w/ scope, three new accessories, a map editor, companion CD-ROM and a strategy guide.
Deer Hunter 3: The Legend Continues Original release date(s): NA: October 1, 1999	Release years by system: 1999—Windows
Deer Hunter 3: The Legend Continues Original release date(s): NA: October 1, 1999	Notes: Developed by Sunstorm Interactive and published by WizardWorks; It is the third game in the series and was developed using SCS Software's TERRENG 4.0 engine; It features 10 weapons, over 15 accessories and has the ability for play over the Internet provided via GameSpy.
Deer Hunter 3 Gold Original release date(s): NA: February 29, 2000	Release years by system: 2000—Windows
Deer Hunter 3 Gold Original release date(s): NA: February 29, 2000	Notes: Developed by Sunstorm Interactive & Sylum Entertainment and published by WizardWorks; It is an updated version of Deer Hunter 3: The Legend Continues which adds 3 new Wisconsin stages, a 7mm Mag Rifle, a few accessories, and a Play-The-Deer mode where player becomes the hunted
Deer Hunter 4: World-Class Record Bucks Original release date(s): NA: September 1, 2000	Release years by system: 2000—Windows
Deer Hunter 4: World-Class Record Bucks Original release date(s): NA: September 1, 2000	Notes: Developed by Sunstorm Interactive and published by WizardWorks; It is the fourth game in the series which has three deer species, more detailed antler modelling and an online trophy trading system
Deer Hunter 5: Tracking Trophies Original release date(s): NA: August 29, 2001	Release years by system: 2001—Windows
Deer Hunter 5: Tracking Trophies Original release date(s): NA: August 29, 2001	Notes: Developed by Sunstorm Interactive & Sylum Entertainment and published by WizardWorks; It is the fifth game in the series and features new locations and multiplayer support for computer controlled 'bot' hunters; It was later released by Atari for digital download
Deer Hunter 2003: Legendary Hunting Original release date(s): NA: October 16, 2002	Release years by system: 2002—Windows
Deer Hunter 2003: Legendary Hunting Original release date(s): NA: October 16, 2002	Notes: Developed by Sunstorm Interactive and published by Infogrames; It is the sixth game in the series and incorporates the ability to design custom weapons
Deer Hunter 2004 Original release date(s): NA: October 13, 2003	Release years by system: 2003—Windows
Deer Hunter 2004 Original release date(s): NA: October 13, 2003	Notes: Developed by Southlogic Studios and published by Atari; It is the seventh game in the series and the first to be developed by Southlogic Studios
Deer Hunter Original release date(s): NA: December 22, 2003	Release years by system: 2003—PlayStation 2
Deer Hunter Original release date(s): NA: December 22, 2003	Notes: Developed by Coresoft and published by Atari; It is the first game in the series to be released on PlayStation 2; Features 17 weapons, a multiplayer mode is supported via broadband connection only and online tournament play
Deer Hunter 2005 Original release date(s): NA: September 28, 2004	Release years by system: 2004—Windows
Deer Hunter 2005 Original release date(s): NA: September 28, 2004	Notes: Developed by Southlogic Studios and published by Atari; It is the eighth game in the series and features six hunting sites and five deer species
Deer Hunter Original release date(s): NA: November 30, 2004	Release years by system: 2004—Mobile phone
Deer Hunter Original release date(s): NA: November 30, 2004	Notes: Developed and published by Sorrent; It is the first game in the Deer Hunter series to be made for the mobile phone
Deer Hunter 2 Original release date(s): NA: October 10, 2006	Release years by system: 2006—BlackBerry, Mobile phone
Deer Hunter 2 Original release date(s): NA: October 10, 2006	Notes: Developed and published by Sorrent
Deer Hunter Tournament Original release date(s): NA: October 14, 2008	Release years by system: 2008—Windows
Deer Hunter Tournament Original release date(s): NA: October 14, 2008	Notes: Developed by Southlogic Studios and published by Atari; It contains several trophy animals and hunting locations; The animals have AI in that they can use their senses for protection, aggressive towards humans, eat, sleep and swim; It has tournament options allowing play in online tournaments; A version was planned to be released for the Xbox 360 but was cancelled
Deer Hunter 3 Original release date(s): NA: August 12, 2009	Release years by system: 2009—BlackBerry
Deer Hunter 3 Original release date(s): NA: August 12, 2009	Notes: Developed and published by Glu Mobile
Deer Hunter 3D Original release date(s): NA: May 15, 2009	Release years by system: 2009—iOS; 2010—Palm WebOS; 2011—Android, Windows Phone
Deer Hunter 3D Original release date(s): NA: May 15, 2009	Notes: Developed and published by Glu Mobile; It is the first game in the series on the iOS
Deer Hunter: African Safari Original release date(s): NA: August 19, 2010	Release years by system: 2010—iOS, BlackBerry; 2011—Android
Deer Hunter: African Safari Original release date(s): NA: August 19, 2010	Notes: Developed and published by Glu Mobile
Deer Hunter: First Shot Original release date(s): NA: September 30, 2010	Release years by system: 2010—iOS
Deer Hunter: First Shot Original release date(s): NA: September 30, 2010	Notes: Developed and published by rockifone.com
Deer Hunter: Bow Master Original release date(s): NA: October 1, 2010	Release years by system: 2010—iOS
Deer Hunter: Bow Master Original release date(s): NA: October 1, 2010	Notes: Developed and published by rockifone.com
Deer Hunter Challenge Original release date(s): NA: December 1, 2010	Release years by system: 2010—iOS; 2011—Android
Deer Hunter Challenge Original release date(s): NA: December 1, 2010	Notes: Developed and published by Glu Mobile
Deer Hunter Original release date(s): NA: November 29, 2011	Release years by system: 2011—iOS
Deer Hunter Original release date(s): NA: November 29, 2011	Notes: Developed and published by Pajenco; A high-definition version was released for the iOS in December 2011
Deer Hunter Reloaded Original release date(s): NA: February 3, 2012	Release years by system: 2012—iOS; 2013—Android
Deer Hunter Reloaded Original release date(s): NA: February 3, 2012	Notes: Developed and published by Glu Mobile
Deer Hunter Online Original release date(s): November 2012	Release years by system: 2012—Web browser
Deer Hunter Online Original release date(s): November 2012	Notes: It is an online game that plays through your web browser and allows you to connect through Facebook
Deer Hunter 2014 Original release date(s): November 22, 2013	Release years by system: 2013—Android & iOS.
Deer Hunter 2014 Original release date(s): November 22, 2013	Notes: Available through the Android Google Play Store; Developed and published by Glu Mobile Renamed Deer Hunter Classic in update version 3.2.

=== Compilations ===
Game	Details
Deer Hunter: Monster Buck 4-Pack Original release date(s): NA: July 30, 1999	Release years by system: 1999—Windows
Deer Hunter: Monster Buck 4-Pack Original release date(s): NA: July 30, 1999	Notes: Developed by Sunstorm Interactive and published by WizardWorks; It is a compilation which includes Deer Hunter: Interactive Hunting Experience, Deer Hunter's Extended Season, Deer Hunter Companion, and Deer Hunter Screensaver
Deer Hunter II: Monster Buck 3-Pack Original release date(s): NA: January 13, 2000	Release years by system: 2000—Windows
Deer Hunter II: Monster Buck 3-Pack Original release date(s): NA: January 13, 2000	Notes: Developed by Sunstorm Interactive and published by WizardWorks; It is a compilation which includes Deer Hunter II: The Hunt Continues, Deer Hunter II: Extended Season, and the Deer Hunter: Huntin' Country Desktop screensaver
Deer Hunter: Trophy Collection Original release date(s): NA: October 31, 2003	Release years by system: 2003—Windows
Deer Hunter: Trophy Collection Original release date(s): NA: October 31, 2003	Notes: Published by Atari; It is a compilation which includes three full games; Deer Hunter 2003: Legendary Hunting, Trophy Hunter 2003: Legendary Hunting and Bird Hunter 2003: Legendary Hunting

=== Cancelled games ===
Game	Details
Deer Hunter 64 Original release date(s):	Release years by system: Nintendo 64
Deer Hunter 64 Original release date(s):	Notes: Was to be published by Microwares before being cancelled
Deer Hunter Original release date(s):	Release years by system: Game.com
Deer Hunter Original release date(s):	Notes: Was announced but never released

== Reception ==
The original Deer Hunter released in 1997 sold nearly 64,700 units.

In the United States, Deer Hunter 4 sold 250,000 copies and earned $4.5 million by August 2006, after its release in November 2001. It was the country's 81st best-selling computer game between January 2000 and August 2006. Combined sales of all Deer Hunter games released between January 2000 and August 2006 had reached 1.4 million in the United States by the latter date.

== See also ==
- Big Buck Hunter, a series of hunting arcade games developed by Play Mechanix and released since 2006 by Raw Thrills
- Cabela's Big Game Hunter, a 1998 hunting video game by HeadGames Publishing
- Carnivores, a dinosaur hunting series, also by WizardWorks and Action Forms
- Deer Avenger, a parodic series of hunting games by Simon & Schuster Interactive
