= Carnivores (band) =

Indie rock band from Atlanta, Georgia

- Origin: Atlanta, Georgia
- Genres: Post-punk, shoegazing, garage, art punk, indie rock, surf pop
- Years active: 2009–(present)
- Label: Army of Bad Luck Records
- Members: Nathaniel Higgins; Philip Frobos; Caitlin Lang; Ross Politi; Billy Mitchell
- Website: carnivoresatl.com

Carnivores is an indie rock band formed in Atlanta, Georgia, in 2009 by Philip Frobos, Nathaniel Higgins, and Caitlin Lang. Their musical style has been described as belonging to the noise pop genre. In 2010 Ross Politi joined on drums, later transitioning to second guitar with Billy Mitchell on drums. They released their first album, All Night Dead USA on Double Phantom Records in 2010. In 2011 they toured with The Black Lips, whose lead singer, Cole Alexander Is featured on a track off their latest album, Second Impulse. They have collaborated with both Bradford Cox and Frankie Broyles past member of Deerhunter on separate occasions and toured with Cox's solo project, Atlas Sound as well as Franz Ferdinand in 2012. In 2013 they signed with Army of Bad Luck Records, the Atlanta-based record company started by former Deerhunter bassist Josh Fauver.

== Discography ==
Studio Albums

- All Night Dead USA (2010)
- If I'm Ancient (2010)
- Second Impulse (2013)

EPs

- Chandelier EP (2011)

Singles

- Dressed For the Rain 7" - Split w/ dinosaur feathers (2011)
- German Flower 7" (2011)
- Prom Night 7" (2011)
- Pillow Talk-Featuring Bradford Cox (2013)
