= Carnivores: Dinosaur Hunter HD =

2013 video game

- Developer: Vogster Entertainment
- Publisher: Vogster Entertainment
- Series: Carnivores
- Platform: PlayStation 3
- Release: NA: September 10, 2013; PAL: December 18, 2013
- Genre: First-person shooter
- Mode: Single-player

Carnivores: Dinosaur Hunter HD, sometimes known as Carnivores HD: Dinosaur Hunter, is a 2013 first-person shooter video game developed and published by Vogster Entertainment. It is the sixth game in the Carnivores series of dinosaur-hunting games, serving as a sequel as well as a modern remake of the original game, Carnivores (1998). The game was released for the PlayStation 3 via the PlayStation Network.

== Gameplay ==
The game's premise is not told within the game itself. According to the PlayStation Network website, the player takes the role of a wealthy space-traveller in the future who hunts dinosaurs for sport on a distant planet similar to Earth.

The game features three environments, including mesas and forests, each with a daytime, dusk, and fog setting. The player is rewarded with gems and money after each hunt. The amount rewarded depends on how well the player did on the hunt. Gems and points are used respectively to purchase new weapons and unlock new environments. The player has access to a multi-purpose hunting device known as Gadget, which features a map, and informs whether the player is being watched by a dinosaur or making too much noise. The device can be updated to include features such as radar, using gems earned from the hunts. The game does not feature any music, but includes dinosaur roars, as well as the sounds of unseen birds, frogs, and insects.

Dinosaurs include Ankylosaurus, Ceratosaurus, Parasaurolophus, Stegosaurus, Triceratops, and Tyrannosaurus rex. The player has the ability to evacuate a hunt at any time. Whenever the player is killed by a dinosaur, the screen fades to blackness rather than depicting a death scene. The player starts out hunting only herbivorous dinosaurs, although a Ceratosaurus can rarely spawn on every map and time. Killed dinosaurs are beamed up by the player's personal spaceship, and the player receives trophy versions of each killed dinosaur and display them in a trophy room. The game includes the "Observer Mode", which allows the player to explore a chosen environment and observe the dinosaurs rather than hunt them. The player also has the option to tranquilize a dinosaur rather than kill it.

== Development and release ==
Carnivores: Dinosaur Hunter HD was developed and published by Vogster Entertainment. It is a modern remake of the original 1998 Carnivores video game, as well as a sequel in the Carnivores series. In the US, the game was released for the PlayStation 3 via the PlayStation Network on September 10, 2013. After its North American release, Vogster Entertainment gathered user feedback to make further improvements to the game prior to its European release, which occurred on December 18, 2013, also through the PlayStation Network.

== Reception ==
Reception

Aggregate score
Aggregator	Score
Metacritic	50/100

Review scores
Publication	Score
Hardcore Gamer	2.5/5
IGN	4/10
Jeuxvideo.com	15/20
PlayStation Official Magazine – UK	6/10
Push Square	6/10

The game received "mixed" reviews according to Metacritic. Reviewers particularly criticized the game for its grinding gameplay.

David Meikleham of PlayStation Official Magazine – UK noted that the game had "a pretty out-there premise". Meikleham criticized the high amount of gems and points needed to purchase and unlock parts of the game, such as weapons and levels. However, he also wrote, "Slow-burning, often unspectacular, this PSN hunter nevertheless has a charming depth if you've got the patience to unearth it." Robert Ramsey of Push Square praised the scenery, but noted the "cheap and tacky" design of the game's menus. Ramsey also criticized the repetitive dinosaur roars and the lack of music.

Kallie Plagge of IGN called the game "slow, aimless, bland, and not nearly as exciting as the name would have us believe." Plagge stated that despite the "HD" in its title, the game had "some truly awful" and outdated textures. Plagge praised the environmental exploration as the highlight of the game, but was critical of the rewards system. Plagge also criticized the ability to evacuate a hunt, stating that "removing any sense of danger or risk takes a lot of the fun out of playing." Additionally, Plagge criticized the lack of player death scenes, and stated that the game "fails to deliver in almost every way."

Lee Cooper of Hardcore Gamer praised the controls but criticized some of the graphics as being "poorly rendered", and stated that while "the dinosaurs look pretty cool, and the environments are expansive and littered with detail, the game is simply not fun." Cooper also criticized the lack of an in-game storyline, but concluded that the game was the "best arcade-style dinosaur hunting game" available for the PS3.
