= Sunstorm Interactive =

Video game developer

Sunstorm Interactive was an American video game developer founded in 1995 by Anthony Campiti, which specialized in hunting simulators and first-person shooters. The majority of their titles were small-scale "value titles", priced between $20 and $30 as compared to the typical computer game that was priced at $50 at the time.

== Overview ==
The company enjoyed their original moderate success by developing add-ons for Build engine first-person shooters such as Duke Nukem 3D, Blood, and Redneck Rampage. At this point, the company had approximately 6 full-time employees. Sunstorm finally made an industry name for itself when it developed the first hunting simulation game Deer Hunter in 1997. Deer Hunter opened up an entirely new genre and spawned many sequels as well as copycats.

The company relocated to a new office and increased the staff size significantly. They followed up with many more hunting simulators and attempted to branch back into developing action games with titles such as the side scroller Duke Nukem: Manhattan Project. However, they were not able to achieve the same level of success again and finally shut down in early 2003 citing financial and staffing difficulties as the primary reasons. Michael Root went on to found Gabriel Entertainment.

In 2009, the company was reborn as Sunstorm Games LLC. by Anthony Campiti. Now creating mobile games for the iOS and Android platforms, by 2013 the company had produced over 80 titles in total, averaging one million active users daily. In April 2015, the company was acquired by TabTale Ltd. for an undisclosed price.

== Games ==
Hunting

- Bird Hunter: Upland Edition
- Bird Hunter: Waterfowl Edition
- Bird Hunter: Wild Wings Edition
- Bird Hunter 2003: Legendary Hunting
- Buckmasters Deer Hunting
- Buckmasters Top Bow Championship
- Carnivores: Cityscape
- Deep Sea Trophy Fishing
- Deer Hunter
- Deer Hunter's Extended Season
- Deer Hunter II: The Hunt Continues
- Deer Hunter II: Extended Season
- Deer Hunter 3: The Legend Continues
- Deer Hunter 3 Gold
- Deer Hunter 4: World-Class Record Bucks
- Deer Hunter 2003
- Feed'n Chloe
- Fishermans Paradise
- Grand Slam Turkey Hunter
- Hunting Unlimited: a 2001 hunting game published by Arush Entertainment and ValuSoft, it was announced in August 2001, and released that October, for Windows. IGN gave the game a score of 7.5 out of 10' stating: "As a consequence, it relaxes the realism a bit and puts a few too many restrictions on your choices. Even so, the game is a great diversion for anyone who's into hunting to begin with and might even attract a few non-hunters."
- Pro Bass Fishing
- Primal Prey
- Rocky Mountain Trophy Hunter: Interactive Big Game Hunting
- Rocky Mountain Trophy Hunter: Alaskan Expedition
- Rocky Mountain Trophy Hunter 2
- Rocky Mountain Trophy Hunter 3
- Shark! Hunting The Great White Shark
- Sportsman's Paradise
- Sportsman's Paradise 2
- Wild Turkey Hunt

Build Engine add-ons

- Duke Caribbean: Life's A Beach for Duke Nukem 3D
- Duke It Out in D.C. for Duke Nukem 3D
- Duke Xtreme for Duke Nukem 3D
- Cryptic Passage for Blood
- Redneck Rampage: Suckin' Grits On Route 66 for Redneck Rampage
- Wanton Destruction for Shadow Warrior (Not commercially released. Given away for free years after development on September 5, 2005)

Other

- Airport Tycoon 2
- Board Game Classics
- Duke Nukem: Manhattan Project
- Hard Truck: 18 Wheels of Steel
- High Impact Paintball
- Indoor Sports Games
- Land Mine!
- Police Tactical Training
- RC DareDevil
- The Skunny series:
  - Skunny: Back to the Forest
  - Skunny: In The Wild West
  - Skunny Kart
  - Skunny: Save Our Pizzas!
  - Skunny's Desert Raid
  - Skunny: Lost in Space
  - Skunny: Special Edition
- W!Zone
- 911 Fire Rescue
