= Carnivores: Ice Age =

2001 video game

- Developer: Action Forms
- Publishers: WizardWorks, Infogrames
- Producer: Michael Gjere
- Programmers: Oleg Slusar; Artem Kuryavchenko; Alexey Menshikov
- Series: Carnivores series
- Platforms: Microsoft Windows, iOS, Android, PlayStation Portable
- Release: Windows: NA: January 16, 2001; EU: 2001; iOS: WW: February 8, 2011 (Pro); WW: September 6, 2012; PSP: EU: August 17, 2011; NA: August 30, 2011
- Genres: Sport (hunting); First-person shooter
- Mode: Single-player

Carnivores: Ice Age is a first-person shooter video game developed by Action Forms and published by WizardWorks for Microsoft Windows. It is the third installment in the Carnivores series. Unlike its predecessors, which focus on hunting dinosaurs, Carnivores: Ice Age shifts its setting to the Cenozoic era, allowing players to hunt prehistoric megafauna such as mammoths and saber-toothed cats. In 2011, the game was ported to iOS and Android by Tatem Games, with PlayStation Portable and PlayStation 3 versions later developed by Beatshapers.

== Storyline ==
The game's storyline continues the premise established by its predecessors. Following the acquisition of the hunting rights to the dinosaur-inhabited planet FMM UV-32, an Earth-based conglomerate established the DinoHunt Corporation, allowing clients to hunt the planet's dinosaur population. After scientists discovered surviving Ice Age fauna in the planet's Arctic regions, the corporation launched a separate hunting program, expanding its operations to include the newly discovered megafauna.

== Gameplay ==
Carnivores: Ice Age is a first-person shooter in which players hunt prehistoric animals across five levels, each featuring distinct environments and wildlife. The game includes 10 huntable species, including Diatryma, Megaloceros, Smilodon, and the woolly rhinoceros. Players may equip a variety of weapons, including a handgun, rifles, shotguns, and a crossbow. Hunting accessories, such as camouflage, cover scents, and radar, are also available, although their use reduces the player's final score.

== Ports ==
Carnivores: Ice Age was ported to iOS and released in the United States on February 8, 2011. The game was subsequently ported to Android, and the mobile version later served as the basis for ports for the PlayStation 3 and PlayStation Portable developed by Beatshapers. These ports retained the original environments and most gameplay features while introducing additional weapons and huntable animals. The game's maps remained unchanged, receiving only minor revisions to enhance gameplay.

== Reception ==
Reception

Aggregate score
Aggregator	Score
Metacritic	(iOS) 75/100 (PSP) 67/100 (PC) 54/100

Review scores
Publication	Score
CNET Gamecenter	(PC) 5/10
Computer Games Strategy Plus	(PC) 2.5/5
EP Daily	(PC) 6/10
GameSpot	(PC) 5.4/10
IGN	(PC) 5.1/10
Jeuxvideo.com	(PSM) 15/20
PlayStation Official Magazine – UK	(PSP) 5/10
PC Gamer (US)	(PC) 15%
Pocket Gamer	(iOS) 3.5/5

According to the review aggregation website Metacritic, the iOS version received "generally favorable" reviews, whereas the PC and PlayStation Portable versions received "mixed or average" reviews.

Reviewing the iOS version, Slide to Play criticized the game's difficulty while concluding that "For the committed mammoth hunter, Carnivores: Ice Age offers a pretty good experience."
