= Index of Windows games (W) =

This is an index of Microsoft Windows games.

This list has been split into multiple pages. Please use the Table of Contents to browse it.

Title	Released	Developer	Publisher
WALL-E	2008	Heavy Iron Studios	Disney Interactive Studios, THQ
Wallace & Gromit in Project Zoo	2003	Frontier Developments	BAM! Entertainment
Wallace & Gromit's Grand Adventures	2009	Telltale Games	Telltale Games
Walt Disney World Quest: Magical Racing Tour	2000	Crystal Dynamics	Eidos Interactive
Wanted: Weapons of Fate	2009	GRIN	Universal Studios
War and Peace: 1796–1815	2002	Microids	Microids
War for the Overworld	2015	Brightrock Games	Brightrock Games
War Front: Turning Point	2007	Digital Reality	CDV Software
War Gods	1996	Midway Games	Midway Games
War Wind	1996	DreamForge Intertainment	Strategic Simulations, Inc.
War Wind II: Human Onslaught	1997	DreamForge Intertainment	Strategic Simulations, Inc.
War World	2005	Third Wave Games	Third Wave Games
War Wound	2007	Apothecary Studios	Apothecary Studios
Warcraft II: Beyond the Dark Portal	1996	Cyberlore Studios	Blizzard Entertainment
Warcraft II: Tides of Darkness	1996	Blizzard Entertainment	Blizzard Entertainment
Warcraft III: Reign of Chaos	2002	Blizzard Entertainment	Blizzard Entertainment
Warcraft III: The Frozen Throne	2003	Blizzard Entertainment	Blizzard Entertainment
WarGames: Defcon 1	1998	Interactive Studios	MGM Interactive, MGM/UA
Warhammer 40,000: Armageddon	2014	Flashback Games, The Lordz Games Studio	Slitherine Software
Warhammer 40,000: Battlesector	2021	Black Lab Games	Slitherine Software
Warhammer 40,000: Chaos Gate	1998	Random Games Inc.	Strategic Simulations, Inc.
Warhammer 40,000: Dawn of War	2004	Relic Entertainment	THQ
Warhammer 40,000: Dawn of War II	2009	Relic Entertainment	THQ
Warhammer 40,000: Dawn of War II – Chaos Rising	2010	Relic Entertainment	THQ
Warhammer 40,000: Dawn of War – Dark Crusade	2006	Relic Entertainment	THQ
Warhammer 40,000: Dawn of War – Soulstorm	2008	Iron Lore Entertainment	THQ
Warhammer 40,000: Dawn of War – Winter Assault	2005	Relic Entertainment	THQ
Warhammer 40,000: Deathwatch	2015	Rodeo Games	Rodeo Games
Warhammer 40,000: Fire Warrior	2003	Kuju Entertainment	THQ
Warhammer 40,000: Gladius – Relics of War	2018	Proxy Studios	Slitherine Software
Warhammer 40,000: Mechanicus	2018	Bulwark Studios	Kasedo Games
Warhammer 40,000: Rites of War	1999	DreamForge	Strategic Simulations, Inc.
Warhammer 40,000: Sanctus Reach	2017	Straylight Entertainment	Slitherine Software
Warhammer: Dark Omen	1998	Mindscape	Electronic Arts
Warhammer: Mark of Chaos	2006	Black Hole Entertainment	Namco Bandai Games
Warhammer Quest	2015	Rodeo Games	Chilled Mouse
Warhammer Quest 2: The End Times	2019	Perchang Games	Perchang Games
Warhammer Quest: Silver Tower	2021	Perchang Games	Perchang Games
Warlords Battlecry II	2002	Strategic Studies Group	Ubisoft
Warlords Battlecry III	2004	Infinite Interactive	Enlight Software
Warlords IV: Heroes of Etheria	2003	Infinite Interactive	Ubisoft
Warm Up!	2000	Lankhor	Microids
Warpath	2006	Digital Extremes	Groove Games
Warrior Kings	2002	Black Cactus, Zonic	Microids, Aspyr Media
Warrior Kings: Battles	2003	Black Cactus	Empire Interactive
Warriors Orochi	2007	Koei	Koei
Warsow	2009	Warsow team	Chasseur de Bots
Wartales	2023	Shiro Games	Shiro Unlimited
Warzone 2100	1999	Pumpkin Studios	Eidos Interactive
Wasteland	2020	InXile Entertainment, Krome Studios	InXile Entertainment
Wasteland 2	2014	InXile Entertainment	Deep Silver
Wasteland 3	2020	InXile Entertainment	Deep Silver
Wasteland Angel	2011	Octane Games	Meridian4
Watch Dogs	2014	Ubisoft Montreal	Ubisoft
Watch Dogs 2	2016	Ubisoft Montreal	Ubisoft
Watch Dogs: Legion	2020	Ubisoft Toronto	Ubisoft
Watchmen: The End Is Nigh	2009	Deadline Games	Warner Bros. Games
Waterworld	1997	Intelligent Games	Interplay Entertainment
The Waylanders	2022	Gato Studio	Gato Studio
Wayward Souls	2019	Rocketcat Games	Rocketcat Games
The Weakest Link	2001	Traveller's Tales	Activision
Wedding Dash	2007	PlayFirst	PlayFirst
We Are Chicago	2017	Culture Shock Games	Culture Shock Games
We Are the Dwarves	2016	Whale Rock Games	Whale Rock Games
We Happy Few	2018	Compulsion Games	Gearbox Publishing
Weird West	2022	WolfEye Studios	Devolver Digital
Werewolf: The Apocalypse – Earthblood	2021	Cyanide (company)	Nacon
Westlanders	2026	The Breach Studios	Radical Theory, The Breach Studios
Wetrix	1998	Zed Two	Zed Two
What Remains of Edith Finch	2017	Giant Sparrow	Annapurna Interactive
Wheelman	2009	Midway Studios Newcastle	Midway Games
Where's Waldo?: Exploring Geography	1996	WarnerActive	WarnerActive
The Whispered World	2009	Daedalic Entertainment	Deep Silver
Whispers of a Machine	2019	Clifftop Games	Raw Fury
White Gold: War in Paradise	2009	Deep Shadows	Russobit-M
Who Wants to Beat Up a Millionaire?	2000	Hypnotix	Simon & Schuster Interactive
Wiggins in Storyland	1994	Virgin Sound and Vision	Virgin Sound and Vision
Wik and the Fable of Souls	2004	Reflexive Entertainment	Reflexive Entertainment
Wild Hearts	2023	Omega Force	Electronic Arts
Wild Metal Country	1999	DMA Design	Gremlin Interactive
Wild West Dynasty	2023	Moon Punch Studio	Toplitz Productions
Wildlife Tycoon: Venture Africa	2005	Pocketwatch Games	Pocketwatch Games, MumboJumbo
Will Rock	2003	Saber Interactive	Ubisoft
Wing Commander IV: The Price of Freedom	1996	Origin Systems	Electronic Arts
Wing Commander: Prophecy	1997	Origin Systems	Electronic Arts
Wing Commander: Privateer - Gemini Gold	2005		
Wings of Power: WWII Heavy Bombers and Jets	2004	Shockwave Productions	TRI SYNERGY
Wings of Power II: WWII Fighters	2006	Shockwave Productions	TRI SYNERGY
Wings of War	2004	Silver Wish Games	Gathering of Developers
Wings Over Europe	2006	Third Wire Productions	Destineer, Bold Games
Wings Over Israel	2008	Third Wire Productions	Third Wire Productions
Wings Over Vietnam	2004	Third Wire Productions	Destineer, Bold Games
Winning Post 7 Maximum 2008	2008	Koei	Koei
Winter Sports: The Ultimate Challenge	2007	49 Games	Conspiracy Entertainment, RTL Games
Wipeout 2097	1996	Psygnosis	Psygnosis
The Witcher	2007	CD Projekt Red	Atari
The Witcher 2	2011	CD Projekt Red	CD Projekt
The Witcher 3: Wild Hunt	2015	CD Projekt Red	CD Projekt
Wizardry 8	2001	Sir-Tech	Sir-Tech
Wizardry VII: Crusaders of the Dark Savant	2013	Sir-tech	Sir-tech
Wo Long: Fallen Dynasty	2023	Team Ninja	Koei Tecmo
Wolfenstein	2009	Raven Software	Activision
Wolfenstein: Enemy Territory	2003	Splash Damage	Activision
Wolfenstein: The New Order	2014	Splash Damage	Activision
Wolfenstein: The Old Blood	2015	MachineGames	Bethesda Softworks
Wolfenstein: Youngblood	2019	MachineGames, Arkane Lyon	Bethesda Softworks
Wolfenstein II: The New Colossus	2017	MachineGames	Bethesda Softworks
WolfQuest	2008	Minnesota Zoo, Eduweb	Eduweb
Word War 5	1995	Créalude	Millennium Media Group, Merriam-Webster
Workers & Resources: Soviet Republic	2024	3Division	Hooded Horse
World Basketball Manager	2003	icehole	icehole
World Championship Pool 2004	2003	Blade Interactive	Jaleco
World Championship Rugby	2004	Swordfish Studios	Acclaim Entertainment
World Cup 98	1998	EA Canada	EA Sports
World in Conflict	2007	Massive Entertainment	Vivendi Games, Ubisoft
World in Conflict: Soviet Assault	2009	Massive Entertainment	Ubisoft
World League Soccer '98	1998	Silicon Dreams Studio	Eidos Interactive
World of Goo	2008	2D Boy	2D Boy
World of Goo 2	2024	2D Boy, Tomorrow Corporation	Tomorrow Corporation
World of Padman	2007	Padworld Entertainment	Padworld Entertainment
World of Warcraft	2004	Blizzard Entertainment	Blizzard Entertainment
World of Warcraft: The Burning Crusade	2007	Blizzard Entertainment	Blizzard Entertainment
World of Warcraft: Wrath of the Lich King	2008	Blizzard Entertainment	Blizzard Entertainment
World of Warcraft: Cataclysm	2010	Blizzard Entertainment	Blizzard Entertainment
World of Warcraft: Mists of Pandaria	2012	Blizzard Entertainment	Blizzard Entertainment
World of Warcraft: Warlords of Draenor	2014	Blizzard Entertainment	Blizzard Entertainment
World of Warcraft: Legion	2016	Blizzard Entertainment	Blizzard Entertainment
World of Warcraft: Battle for Azeroth	2018	Blizzard Entertainment	Blizzard Entertainment
World of Warcraft: Shadowlands	2020	Blizzard Entertainment	Blizzard Entertainment
World of Zoo	2009	Blue Fang Games	THQ
World Series of Poker	2005	Left Field Productions	Activision
World Series of Poker 2008: Battle for the Bracelets	2007	Left Field Productions	Activision
World Series of Poker: Tournament of Champions	2006	Left Field Productions	Activision
World War II Combat: Iwo Jima	2006	Direct Action Games	Groove Games
World War II Combat: Road to Berlin	2006	Direct Action Games	Groove Games
World War II: Frontline Command	2003	Bitmap Brothers	Deep Silver, Strategy First
World War II: Pacific Heroes	2004	City Interactive Games	City Interactive Games
World War III: Black Gold	2001	Reality Pump	JoWooD Productions
WorldShift	2008	Crytek Black Sea	Playlogic International
Worms 2	1997	Team17	Team17, MicroProse
Worms 2: Armageddon	2009	Team17	Team17
Worms 3D	2003	Team17	Acclaim Entertainment, Sega, Feral Software
Worms 4: Mayhem	2005	Team17	Majesco, Codemasters
Worms Armageddon	1999	Team17	Team17, Hasbro Interactive
Worms Blast	2002	Team17	Ubi Soft
Worms Forts: Under Siege	2004	Team17	Sega
Worms World Party	2001	Team17	Titus Interactive
WSC Real 08: World Snooker Championship	2009	Blade Interactive	Koch Media
WWE 2K15	2015	Yuke's; Visual Concepts	2K Sports
WWE 2K16	2016	Yuke's; Visual Concepts	2K Sports
WWE 2K17	2017	Yuke's; Visual Concepts	2K Sports
WWE 2K18	2017	Yuke's; Visual Concepts	2K Sports
WWE 2K19	2018	Yuke's; Visual Concepts	2K Sports
WWE 2K20	2019	Yuke's; Visual Concepts	2K Sports
WWF Raw	2002	Anchor Inc.	THQ
