= List of TrackIR Enhanced games =

This is a list of TrackIR Enhanced PC games.

== # ==
- 18 Wheels of Steel: American Long Haul - [Yaw, Pitch, X, Y, Z]
- 18 Wheels of Steel: Extreme Trucker 2 - [Yaw, Pitch, X, Y, Z]
- 18 Wheels of Steel: Extreme Trucker - [Yaw, Pitch, X, Y, Z]
- 18 Wheels Of Steel: Haulin' - [Yaw, Pitch, X, Y, Z]

== A ==
- Aces High 2 - [Yaw, Pitch, Roll, X, Y, Z]
- AeroFly 5 - [Yaw, Pitch, Roll, X, Y, Z]
- Aerofly FS - [Yaw, Pitch, Roll, X, Y, Z]
- Air Battles: Sky Defender - [Yaw, Pitch, Roll, X, Y, Z]
- Air Missions: Hind - [Yaw, Pitch, Roll]
- America's Army - [Yaw, Pitch] v2.8.2 only in HMMWV vehicle
- American Truck Simulator - [Yaw, Pitch, X, Y, Z]
- Apache: Air Assault - [Yaw, Pitch, Roll, X, Y, Z]
- ArmA: Armed Assault - [Yaw, Pitch, X, Z]
- ARMA 2 - [Yaw, Pitch, X, Z]
- ARMA 2: Operation Arrowhead - [Yaw, Pitch, Roll, X, Z]
- Arma 2: Reinforcements - [Yaw, Pitch, Roll, X, Z]
- Arma 3 - [Yaw, Pitch, Roll, X, Z]
- Arvoch Alliance - [Yaw, Pitch, Roll, X, Y, Z]
- Arvoch Conflict - [Yaw, Pitch, Roll, X, Y, Z]
- Assetto Corsa - [Yaw, Pitch, Roll, X, Y, Z]
- Assetto Corsa Competizione - [Yaw, Pitch, Roll, X, Y, Z]
- Automobilista - [Yaw, Pitch, Roll, X, Y, Z]
- Automobilista 2 - [Yaw, Pitch, Roll, X, Y, Z]

== B ==
- BeamNG.drive - [Yaw, Pitch, Roll, X, Y, Z]
- Rowan's Battle of Britain - [Yaw, Pitch]
- Battle of Britain II: Wings of Victory - [Yaw, Pitch, Roll, X, Y, Z]
- Battleground Europe: World War II Online - [Yaw, Pitch]
- Beyond the Red Line (FreeSpace 2 mod) - [Yaw, Pitch, Roll, X, Y, Z]
- BOMB: Who let the dogfight? - [Yaw, Pitch, Roll, X, Y, Z]

== C ==
- The Crew - [Yaw, Pitch, Roll, X, Y, Z]
- Colin McRae Rally 2004 - [Yaw, Pitch, Roll, X, Y, Z]
- Combat Air Patrol 2 - [Yaw, Pitch, Roll, X, Y, Z]
- Combat Flight Simulator 3: Battle for Europe - [Yaw, Pitch, X, Y, Z]
- Combat Helo - [Yaw, Pitch, Roll, X, Y, Z]
- Saitek Combat Pilot - [Yaw, Pitch, Roll, X, Y, Z]
- Condor: The Competition Soaring Simulator - [Yaw, Pitch]
- Condor 2: The Complete Soaring Simulator - [Yaw, Pitch]
- Crashday - [Yaw, Pitch]
- Cross Racing Championship Extreme 2005 - [Yaw, Pitch, Roll, X, Y, Z]

== D ==
- Darkfield VR - [Yaw, Pitch, Roll, X, Y, Z]
- DayZ - [Yaw, Pitch, Roll, X, Z]
- DayZ Mod - [Yaw, Pitch, X, Z]
- DCS: Black Shark - [Yaw, Pitch, Roll, X, Y, Z]
- DCS: Black Shark 2 - [Yaw, Pitch, Roll, X, Y, Z]
- DCS: A-10C - [Yaw, Pitch, Roll, X, Y, Z]
- Descent: D2X-XL - [Yaw, Pitch, Roll, X, Y, Z]
- DiRT - [Yaw, Pitch, Roll, X, Y, Z]
- DiRT 2 - [Yaw, Pitch, Roll, X, Y, Z]
- DiRT 3 - [Yaw, Pitch, Roll, X, Y, Z]
- Dirt Rally - [Yaw, Pitch, Roll, X, Y, Z]
- Dirt Rally 2.0 - [Yaw, Pitch, Roll, X, Y, Z]
- Diaspora: Shattered Armistice - [Yaw, Pitch, Roll, X, Y, Z]
- Dovetail Flight School - [Yaw, Pitch, Roll, X, Y, Z]
- Dovetail Train Simulator 2015 - [Yaw, Pitch, Roll, X, Y, Z]

== E ==
- Elite: Dangerous - [Yaw, Pitch, Roll, X, Y, Z]
- Enemy Engaged: RAH-66 Comanche vs. KA-52 Hokum - [Yaw, Pitch, Roll, X, Y, Z]
- Enemy Engaged 2 - [Yaw, Pitch]
- Euro Truck Simulator - [Yaw, Pitch, X, Y, Z]
- Euro Truck Simulator 2 - [Yaw, Pitch, X, Y, Z]
- Evochron Alliance 2.0 - [Yaw, Pitch, Roll, X, Y, Z]
- Evochron Legends - [Yaw, Pitch, Roll, X, Y, Z]
- Evochron Mercenary - [Yaw, Pitch, Roll, X, Y, Z]
- Evochron Renegades - [Yaw, Pitch, Roll, X, Y, Z]
- EZCA (Flight Simulator X mod) - [Yaw, Pitch, Roll, X, Y, Z]

== F ==
- F-22 Total Air War - [Yaw, Pitch]
- F1 Challenge - [Yaw, Pitch]
- Falcon 4.0 - [Yaw, Pitch]
- Falcon BMS 4.32 Update 7 - [Yaw, Pitch, Roll, X, Y, Z]
- Falcon BMS 4.33 Update 1-5 - [Yaw, Pitch, Roll, X, Y, Z]
- Falcon 4.0: Allied Force - [Yaw, Pitch]
- Falcon 4.0 FreeFalcon4/RedViper - [Yaw, Pitch, Roll, X, Y, Z]
- Falcon 4.0 FreeFalcon5 - [Yaw, Pitch, Roll, X, Y, Z]
- Falcon 4.0 Open Falcon - [Yaw, Pitch, Roll, X, Y, Z]
- Farming Simulator 17 - [Yaw, Pitch, X, Y, Z]
- Farming Simulator 19 - [Yaw, Pitch, X, Y, Z]
- First Eagles: The Great War 1918 - [Yaw, Roll, X, Y, Z]
- Flight Simulator 2002 - [Yaw, Pitch]
- Flight Simulator 2004: A Century of Flight - [Yaw, Pitch, Roll, X, Y, Z]
- Flight Simulator X - [Yaw, Pitch, Roll, X, Y, Z]
- Flyboys - [Yaw, Pitch]
- Future Pinball - [Yaw, Pitch, X, Y, Z]
- FreeSpace 2 Open - [Yaw, Pitch, Roll, X, Y, Z]

== G ==
- Garry's Mod - [Yaw, Pitch, Roll, X, Y, Z]
- GTR - [Yaw, Pitch, Roll, X, Y, Z]
- GTR 2 - [Yaw, Pitch, Roll, X, Y, Z]
- GT Legends - [Yaw, Pitch, Roll, X, Y, Z]
- Grand Prix Legends - [Yaw, Pitch, X, Y, Z] using GPLShift 7.3.2
- Race Driver: GRID - [Yaw, Pitch, Roll, X, Y, Z]

== H ==
- Harrier Attack II - [Yaw, Pitch, X, Y, Z]

== I ==
- IL-2 Sturmovik: Forgotten Battles - [Yaw, Pitch]
- IL-2 Sturmovik: 1946 - [Yaw, Pitch] or [Yaw, Pitch, Roll, X, Y, Z] with 6DOF Mod
- IL-2 Sturmovik: Cliffs of Dover - [Yaw, Pitch, Roll, X, Y, Z]
- IL-2 Sturmovik: Great Battles - [Yaw, Pitch, Roll, X, Y, Z]
- Insurgency: Modern Infantry Combat (Half-Life 2 mod) - [Yaw, Pitch, Roll]
- iRacing - [Yaw, Pitch, Roll, X, Y, Z]

== J ==
- Jane's F/A-18 - [Yaw, Pitch]
- JetPakNG (Flight Simulator 2004 mod) - [Yaw, Pitch, Roll, X, Y, Z]
- Jumpgate: The Reconstruction Initiative - [Yaw, Pitch]
- Jumpgate Evolution - [Yaw, Pitch]

== K ==
- Kerbal Space Program - [Yaw, Pitch, X, Y, Z]

== L ==
- Live for Speed - [Yaw, Pitch, Roll, X, Y, Z]
- Lock On: Modern Air Combat - [Yaw, Pitch]
- Lock On 1.1: Flaming Cliffs - [Yaw, Pitch, Z]
- Lock On: Flaming Cliffs 2 - [Yaw, Pitch, Roll, Z]
- LunarPilot (Flight Simulator 2004 mod) - [Yaw, Pitch, Roll, X, Y, Z]

== M ==
- M4 Tank Platoon
- MechWarrior Online
- Mediterranean Air War (Combat Flight Simulator 3 mod) - [Yaw, Pitch, X, Y, Z]
- Micro Flight - [Yaw, Pitch]
- Microsoft Flight Simulator (2020) - [Yaw, Pitch, Roll, X, Y, Z]
- Microsoft ESP (Flight Simulator X mod) - [Yaw, Pitch, Roll, X, Y, Z]
- MiG Alley - [Yaw, Pitch, Roll, X, Y, Z]
- Miner Wars - [Yaw, Pitch, Roll, X, Y, Z]
- Miscreated - [Yaw, Pitch, Roll, X, Y, Z]

== N ==
- NASCAR Racing 2003 Season - [Yaw, Pitch, Roll, X, Y, Z]
- NASCAR SimRacing - [Yaw, Pitch, Roll, X, Y, Z]
- netKar Pro - [Yaw, Pitch, Roll, X, Y, Z]
- Nitro Stunt Racing - [Yaw, Pitch, Roll, X, Y, Z]

== O ==
- OMSI - The Bus Simulator - [Yaw, Pitch, Roll, X, Y, Z]
- Operation Flashpoint: Dragon Rising - [Yaw, Pitch] only in vehicles
- Operation Flashpoint: Red River - [Yaw, Pitch] only in vehicles
- Over Flanders Field (Combat Flight Simulator 3 mod) - [Yaw, Pitch, X, Y, Z]
- OMSI 2

== P ==
- Pacific Fighters - [Yaw, Pitch]
- Project Cars - [Yaw, Pitch, Roll, X, Y, Z]
- Project Cars 2 - [Yaw, Pitch, Roll, X, Y, Z]
- Project Torque - [Yaw, Pitch, Roll, X, Y, Z]
- Prepar3D (Flight Simulator X mod) - [Yaw, Pitch, Roll, X, Y, Z]

== R ==
- RACE - The Official WTCC Game - [Yaw, Pitch, Roll, X, Y, Z]
- RACE 07 - Official WTCC Game - [Yaw, Pitch, Roll, X, Y, Z]
- Rail Simulator
- RailWorks 2
- Red Baron 3D - [Yaw, Pitch]
- rFactor - [Yaw, Pitch, Roll, X, Y, Z]
- rFactor 2 - [Yaw, Pitch, Roll, X, Y, Z]
- Richard Burns Rally - [Yaw, Pitch]
- Rise of Flight - [Yaw, Pitch, Roll, X, Y, Z]
- Rise: The Vieneo Province - [Yaw, Pitch, Roll, X, Y, Z]
- Rust - [Yaw, Pitch, X, Y, Z]

== S ==
- Ship Simulator 2006 - [Yaw, Pitch, Roll, X, Y, Z]
- Ship Simulator 2008 - [Yaw, Pitch, X, Y, Z]
- Silent Wings - [Yaw, Pitch, Roll, X, Y, Z]
- Sir, You Are Being Hunted - [Yaw, Pitch, Roll, X]
- Simax Simulation Driving Simulator - [Yaw, Pitch, X, Y, Z] software not available separately.
- Space Shuttle Mission 2007 - [Yaw, Pitch, X, Y, Z]
- Starshatter - [Yaw, Pitch, X, Y, Z]
- Star Citizen - [Yaw, Pitch, Roll, X, Y, Z]
- Star Wars Galaxies: Jump to Lightspeed - [Yaw, Pitch]
- Strike Fighters: Project 1 - [Yaw, Pitch, X, Y, Z]
- Strike Fighters 2 - [Yaw, Pitch, X, Y, Z]
- Superkarting Demo - [Yaw, Pitch, Z]

== T ==
- Targetware Series - [Yaw, Pitch]
- Test Drive Unlimited - [Yaw, Pitch]
- theHunter - [Yaw, Pitch, Roll, X, Y, Z]
- thriXXX Technology Series - [Yaw, Pitch, Roll, X, Y, Z]
- TOCA Race Driver 2 - [Yaw, Pitch, Roll, X, Y, Z]
- Tom Clancy's H.A.W.X - [Yaw, Pitch, X, Y, Z]
- Tom Clancy's H.A.W.X 2 - [Yaw, Pitch, X, Y, Z]
- Tower Simulator - [Yaw, Pitch, Z]
- Train Sim World 2 - [Yaw, Pitch, X, Y, Z]
- Trainz Railroad Simulator 2006 - [Yaw, Pitch]
- Trainz Classic - [Yaw, Pitch]
- Trainz Simulator 2010 - [Yaw, Pitch]
- Turismo Carretera - [Yaw, Pitch, Roll, X, Y, Z]

== V ==
- VBS2
- Vehicle Simulator - [Yaw, Pitch]
- Virtual Sailor - [Yaw, Pitch]

== W ==
- WarBirds - [Yaw, Pitch]
- War Thunder - [Yaw, Pitch, X, Y, Z]
- Wings of Prey - [Yaw, Pitch, Roll, X, Y, Z]
- Wings of War - [Yaw, Pitch, Roll, X, Y, Z]
- Wings Over Europe - [Yaw, Pitch, X, Y, Z]
- Wings Over Flanders Fields:U.E. - [Yaw, Pitch, X, Y, Z]
- Wings Over Israel - [Yaw, Pitch, X, Y, Z]
- Wings Over The Reich - [Yaw, Pitch, X, Y, Z]
- Wings Over Vietnam - [Yaw, Pitch, X, Y, Z]
- WWII Battle Tanks: T-34 vs. Tiger - [Yaw, Pitch]

== X ==
- X Motor Racing - [Yaw, Pitch, Roll, X, Y, Z]
- X3: Albion Prelude - [Yaw, Pitch]
- X: Rebirth - [Yaw, Pitch]
- X-Plane - [Yaw, Pitch, X, Y, Z]

== See also ==
- List of games compatible with FreeTrack
