= List of games compatible with FreeTrack =

This is a list of personal computer games compatible with FreeTrack by interface.

== FreeTrack interface ==
- ARMA: Armed Assault - [Yaw, Pitch, X, Z]
- ARMA 2 - [Yaw, Pitch, X, Z]
- ARMA 2: Operation Arrowhead - [Yaw, Pitch, X, Z]
- ARMA 3 - [Yaw, Pitch, X, Y, Z]
- Assetto Corsa - [Yaw, Pitch, X, Y, Z]
- Automobilista 2 - [Yaw, Pitch, Roll, X, Y, Z]
- DayZ Standalone - [Yaw, Pitch, X, Y, Z]
- Dirt Rally - [Yaw, Pitch, Roll, X, Y, Z]
- Elite: Dangerous - [Yaw, Pitch, Roll, X, Y, Z]
- Euro Truck Simulator 2 - [Yaw, Pitch, X, Y, Z]
- GP Bikes - [Yaw, Pitch]
- Iron Front: Liberation 1944 - [Yaw, Pitch, X, Z]
- Kart Racing PRO - [Yaw, Pitch]
- Miscreated - [Yaw, Pitch, Roll, X, Y, Z]
- Microsoft Flight Simulator (2020) [Yaw, Pitch, Roll, X, Y, Z]
- Take On Helicopters - [Yaw, Pitch, Roll, X, Y, Z]
- World Racing Series - [Yaw, Pitch]
- X3: Albion Prelude - [Yaw, Pitch, Roll]

=== With third-party support ===
- Battlefield 2 - [Yaw, Pitch, Roll, X, Y, Z] - BF2FreeLook
- DCS: A-10C - [Yaw, Pitch, Roll, X, Y, Z] - FreeTrack compatible headtracker.dll plugin
- DCS: Black Shark 2 - [Yaw, Pitch, Roll, X, Y, Z] - FreeTrack compatible headtracker.dll plugin
- DCS: World - [Yaw, Pitch, Roll, X, Y, Z] - FreeTrack compatible headtracker.dll plugin
- Unity game engine - [Yaw, Pitch, Roll, X, Y, Z] - Unity Package
- X-Plane 9/10 - [Yaw, Pitch, Roll, X, Y, Z] - ft2xplane

== FSUIPC ==
- Flight Simulator 2002 - [Yaw, Pitch, Z]
- Flight Simulator 2004: A Century of Flight - [Yaw, Pitch, Z]

== SimConnect ==
- ESP - [Yaw, Pitch, Roll, X, Y, Z]
- Flight Simulator X - [Yaw, Pitch, Roll, X, Y, Z]
- Flight Simulator 2020 - [Yaw, Pitch, Roll, X, Y, Z]
- Prepar3D - [Yaw, Pitch, Roll, X, Y, Z]

== TrackIR interface ==
All TrackIR Enhanced games, along with the following special cases:

=== Require TIRViews.dll file, distributed with TrackIR software ===
- Colin McRae Rally
- Combat Flight Simulator 3: Battle for Europe
- F1 Challenge '99-'02
- Flight Simulator 2004
- Flight Simulator X
- JetPakNG (Flight Simulator 2004 mod)
- LunarPilot (Flight Simulator 2004 mod)
- Mediterranean Air War (Combat Flight Simulator 3 mod)
- NASCAR Racing 2003 Season
- Over Flanders Fields (Combat Flight Simulator 3 mod)
- Richard Burns Rally
- TOCA Race Driver 2
- Wings of War
- War Thunder

=== Encrypted interface and compatible only after using TrackIRFixer ===
- DCS: Black Shark
- LOMAC: Flaming Cliffs 2
- DCS: A-10C
- DCS: Black Shark 2
- DCS: World
- Iron Front: Liberation 1944
- Microsoft Flight
- Operation Flashpoint: Dragon Rising
- Operation Flashpoint: Red River
- Tom Clancy's H.A.W.X
- Tom Clancy's H.A.W.X 2
- DiRT 2
- DiRT 3
- F1 2010
- F1 2011
- F1 2012
- Take On Helicopters
- theHunter

=== With third-party support ===
By ToCA EDIT:

- Need for Speed: Hot Pursuit (2010)
- Need for Speed: Shift
- Need For Speed: Most Wanted (2012)
- Need for Speed: The Run
- Ridge Racer Unbounded
- Shift 2: Unleashed
- Sleeping Dogs
- Test Drive Unlimited 2
- WRC: FIA World Rally Championship
- WRC 3: FIA World Rally Championship

By JSJ:

- Grand Prix Legends
- Kuju Rail Simulator (RailWorks)
- RailWorks 2
- RailWorks 4: Train Simulator 2013
