= CFS3 =

CFS3 may refer to:

- Fort Selkirk Aerodrome, which has a TC LID CFS3
- Combat Flight Simulator 3: Battle for Europe
