= Rhiannon: Curse of the Four Branches =

2008 video game

- Developer: Arberth Studios
- Publishers: NA: Got Game Entertainment; EU: Lighthouse Interactive
- Platform: Windows
- Release: NA: October 6, 2008; EU: October 24, 2008
- Genre: Adventure
- Mode: Single-player

Rhiannon: Curse of the Four Branches is an adventure game by British developer Arberth Studios. It was originally published in English by Got Game Entertainment and Lighthouse Interactive.

== Plot and gameplay ==
The game is set on the Celtic fringes of Britain; a place where myth and magic spill into reality, threatening the sanity of a teenage girl named Rhiannon. An ancient battle for revenge engulfs Ty Pryderi, the remote Welsh farmstead Rhiannon now calls home. She begins to hear unexplained noises, see disturbing visions, and experience other chilling paranormal phenomena. There is an ancient evil lurking in the walls of Ty Pryderi that holds a terrible connection to a timeless struggle between man and magic fabled in the Mabinogion Legends. Her parents take Rhiannon away, leaving Ty Pryderi to your watch and exploration, but their absence can only postpone the inevitability of revenge and death.

It is played as a classic first person "point and click" adventure, with the world being represented by pre-rendered, animated screens.

The adventure is based on a non linear structure, that gives the player a lot of freedom in exploring the environment and collecting clues, letting them solve the game at their own pace.

== Development ==
The game is created by Karen Bruton, her husband Noel Bruton, and her brother Richard Lee, who all cofounded Arberth Studios. They live in West Wales, which they admitted to use heavily as a model for Ty Pryderi. The symbolisms associated with Earth, Water, Fire and Air that are referenced in the game are also taken from a study of putative practical magic that Karen and Noel Bruton undertook a few years ago. The idea for the game arose after Karen finished playing Barrow Hill: Curse of the Ancient Circle.

== Release ==
On June 25, 2008, Arberth Studios reached a deal with the North American distributor Got Game Entertainment, subsequently releasing Rhiannon: Curse of the Four Branches on October 6, 2008.

Following a successful release of the game in North America, Arberth Studios pursue the release of the game in Europe, excluding at first such countries as Italy, Greece and Russia.

Arberth Studios released a German version of the game in 2010, prior to which it was translated into Russian and got published by a Russian company Logrus, in 2008. A group of French and Belgian enthusiasts known as Les Rhemystes completed the French translation and a download-only release followed in the Autumn of 2009, again published by Arberth Studios. Italian gaming site Puntaeclicca.com enabled the Italian download-only release in 2010.

In August 2009 the developers appealed for volunteers to translate the game into the Welsh language.

== Rights issues ==
Following the collapse of Lighthouse Interactive in early 2009, all European rights reverted to Arberth Studios. The developer then converted itself into a publisher and began selling the English game directly.

In May 2009, Arberth dispensed with the services of Got Game Entertainment following months of declining stock availability in Got Game's North American Territory and a failure to pay expected royalties. In August 2010, Arberth was still pursuing Got Game Entertainment for unpaid royalties.

== Critical reception ==
Reception

Aggregate score
Aggregator	Score
Metacritic	67/100

Review scores
Publication	Score
Adventure Gamers	3/5
GameSpot	7.5/10
IGN	7.5/10

Rhiannon: Curse of the Four Branches has received mixed or average reviews from general gaming critics, and currently has an aggregate score of 67 on Metacritic. While the storytelling and puzzles were praised, some criticism was leveled at the graphics and sound, which were said to detract from the experience due to their low quality. The most positive reviews came from GameSpot as well as IGN, which stated that "In spite of a few missteps, Rhiannon: Curse of the Four Branches is a good-looking, entertaining and well-made game, especially considering the size of the dev team."
