= Hands-free computing =

Hands-free computing refers to a computer system where a user can interface without the use of their hands, an otherwise common requirement of human interface devices such as the mouse and keyboard. Hands-free computing is important because it is useful to both able and disabled users. Speech recognition systems can be trained to recognize specific commands and upon confirmation of correctness instructions can be given to systems without the use of hands. This may be useful while driving or to an inspector or engineer in a factory environment. Likewise disabled persons may find hands-free computing important in their everyday lives. just like visually impaired have found computers useful in their lives.

This can range from using the tongue, lips, mouth, or movement of the head to voice activated interfaces utilizing speech recognition software and a microphone or bluetooth technology.

Examples of available hands-free computing devices include mouth-operated trackpads, such as the MouthPad^; Mouth-operated joystick types such as the QuadJoy thru Quad.Life, TetraMouse, the Jouse2, the QuadStick, and the IntegraMouse; head-based motion sensing such as the MouthPad^; camera based head tracking systems such as SmartNav, Tracker Pro, FreeTrack, HeadMouse Extreme, HeadMaster, KinesicMouse and Smyle Mouse; and speech recognition specialized for disabilities such as Voice Finger. Camera types require targets mounted on the user, usually with the help of a caregiver, that are sensed by the camera and associated software. Camera types are sensitive to ambient lighting and the mouse pointer may drift and inaccuracies result from head movements not intended to be mouse movements. Other examples of hands-free mice are units that are operated using switches that may be operated by the feet (or other parts of the body), such as the NoHands Mouse and the switch-adapted TetraMouse. Speech recognition specialized for disabilities and hands-free computing focus more on low-level control of the keyboard and mouse than on usual areas like dictation.

== See also ==
- Amazon Alexa
- Section 508 Amendment to the Rehabilitation Act of 1973
- Footmouse
- Eye tracking
- Speech recognition
- Touchless user interface
- Tetraplegia
