= OMSI (video game) =

2011 simulation video game

- Developer: MR Software
- Publisher: Aerosoft
- Platform: Windows
- Release: 25 March 2011
- Genre: Simulation
- Mode: Single-player

OMSI (Note: Variously known in English as OMSI Bus Simulator, OMSI: The Omnibus Simulator, or OMSI: The Bus Simulator, original German title OMSI – Der Omnibussimulator) is a simulation video game developed by MR Software and published by Aerosoft. The player is tasked with operating a bus route through a recreation of the real world borough of Spandau, Berlin, keeping to the route's schedule and picking up and dropping off passengers.

The game was released on 25 March 2011. Reviews praised its level of realism in recreating buses and its simulated world, while its visual presentation, physics engine, and simulated riders received both positive and negative feedback. After release, Aerosoft published addons introducing new routes, buses, and cities. MR and Aerosoft released a sequel, OMSI 2, in December 2013.

== Gameplay ==
OMSI is a single-player game which simulates driving a bus in a part of 1980s-era Berlin. The player is tasked with operating a bus route, keeping the bus on schedule for its stops while picking up and dropping off passengers. In the base game, the simulated area consists of an 11km route in Spandau, and three bus lines are available. A seven-stop line in the fictional town of Grundorf is used for the game's tutorial. The MAN SD200 and SD202 double-decker buses are available to drive.

The game supports controls via keyboard, TrackIR, and racing wheel peripherals. It includes an editor that allows players to create new routes and buses.

== Development and release ==
OMSI was developed by MR Software, a German studio of two developers, who were civil engineering students and amateur game developers. It was released on 25 March 2011 for Windows.

After release, Aerosoft published addons introducing new buses, routes, and cities, including Vienna – The High-Floor Bus LU 200, set in Vienna, Austria, City Bus O 305, which introduced the Mercedes-Benz O305 and the fictional town of Neuendorf, and Hamburg - Day & Night, set in Hamburg, Germany.

== Reception ==
Reception

Review scores
Publication	Score
PC Gamer	90/100
4Players	8/10
PC Action	23/100

Reviewers praised the level of realism of OMSI. Writing for PC Gamer, Tim Stone contrasted the game with other vehicle simulators, including Microsoft Flight Simulator and RailWorks, opining that OMSI achieved a realism in both its vehicles and environments. He cited the audio, visuals, physics engine, and AI-controlled motorists as contributing to that immersion. Mourad Zarrouk of 4Players praised the quality of the simulation, commenting that, being familiar with the real world location, they were amazed at the fidelity of the recreation of Spandau. Both Zarrouk and Stone described the behavior of the simulated pedestrians as one of the game's few flaws. In a more negative review in PC Action, Tobias Weituschat cited the pedestrians, along with low-fidelity graphics and poor presentation, as issues.

Rock Paper Shotgun's Graham Smith called OMSI relaxing, describing operating the bus as a trance-like routine that allowed his mind to wander and playing the game as making him feel recharged. In contrast, Weituschat described playing the game as boring and irritating.

== Legacy ==
MR Software released a sequel, OMSI 2, in December 2013.
