= Lighthouse Interactive =

Video game publisher

Lighthouse Interactive Game Publishing B.V. was a video game publisher established in 2005 by industry veterans. With its head office in Haarlem, The Netherlands and a satellite office in Montreal, Canada, the company grew quickly and went on to establish offices in Toronto, Canada, and London, England.

The company was best known for publishing iconic titles such as the Sword of the Stars series, the Ship Simulator series and many other critically acclaimed titles. The company was also the publisher of German Publisher dtp, in Scandinavia, UK and North America. In 2008 the company was acquired by the Canadian publicly traded company SilverBirch, in a cash transaction on 31 July 2008. SilverBirch was unable to survive the credit crisis of 2008 and was eventually forced into bankruptcy. As a fully owned subsidiary, Lighthouse Interactive was also closed.

== Games published ==
=== 2006 ===
- LocoMania
- War World
- Ship Simulator 2006
- Barrow Hill: Curse of the Ancient Circle
- Sword of the Stars
- Keepsake

=== 2007 ===
- Darkness Within: October 2007
- Delaware St. John: Volume 1+2: February 2007
- Delaware St. John: Volume 3: June 2007
- Ship Simulator 2006 Add-On: February 2007
- Warpath: February 2007
- Sword of the Stars: Born of Blood 2007
- Undercover: Operation Wintersun - September 2007
- Ship Simulator 2008
- Avencast: Rise of the Mage November 2007
- SunAge: November 2007
- WWII Battle Tanks: T-34 vs. Tiger: 16 November 2007

=== 2008 ===
- Ship Simulator 2008: New Horizons April 2008
- Overclocked: A History of Violence - April 2008
- Belief & Betrayal - June 2008 (Excluding The Benelux)
- The Lost Crown: A Ghost-Hunting Adventure - July 2008 (UK)
- Sword of the Stars: A Murder of Crows - October 2008
- Rhiannon: Curse of the Four Branches - October 2008

=== Ship Simulator: Extremes ===
It will be the first game in the series that was not published by Lighthouse Interactive, but by Paradox Inc.
