= First Eagles: The Great War 1918 =

2006 video game

- Developer(s): Third Wire Productions
- Publisher(s): G2 Games
- Designer(s): Tsuyoshi Kawahito
- Engine: Strike Fighters
- Platform(s): Windows
- Release: December 2006
- Genre(s): Flight simulation
- Mode(s): Single-player, multiplayer

First Eagles: The Great War 1918 (also called First Eagles: The Great Air War 1918) is a PC combat / flight simulator game that focuses on World War I ("the Great War") between 1917 and 1918.

First Eagles has had fair success in the PC games market, although its impact has a lot to do with the game having an 'open architecture' allowing others to modify and improve aspects of it and add new planes, terrain, weapons etc.

In 2007, First Eagles: Expansion Pack 1 was released that adds the Sopwith Camel, Albatros D.III, Albatros D.Va, and Fokker Dr.I. This pack also includes new campaigns set over the Cambrai sector of France.

In 2008, First Eagles: Gold, a combo pack that contains both the original First Eagles and Expansion Pack 1, was released.

In February 2010, First Eagles 2 was released, following the trend of upgrading to be compatible with Vista and Windows 7.

== Gameplay ==
Every encounter in World War I aerial combat is a close range turning dogfight that can have many outcomes including the planes colliding, spinning out of control, crashing into the ground, being hit by anti aircraft artillery, or being shot down or killed, depending on the game skill level set and the players skill level.

The game has a useful 'Single Mission' option that allows the user to choose their mission, aircraft type, weapons, year, nationality, weather, and time of day, and look at a map of the mission area. A set of names are generated to be included on the squadron roster and they are allocated varying skill levels (ranks). Flight above enemy territory results in anti-aircraft fire.

== See also ==
- Third Wire
- Strike Fighters: Project 1
- Falcon 4.0
- List of World War I video games
