= Tri Synergy =

US based video game publisher

Tri Synergy, Inc.
- Type: Private
- Industry: Video game publisher
- Founded: 1996
- Headquarters: Dallas, Texas

Tri Synergy was a video game publisher founded in 1996 in Dallas, Texas. They specialized in co-publishing games made by a variety of developers. The company's website is defunct, and they have not worked on any projects since 2015, so they likely no longer operate.

== Games ==
Year	Title	Other notes
1998	Gunmetal	
2000	The Longest Journey	
2001	Jazz and Faust	
2001	Shattered Galaxy	
2003	One Must Fall: Battlegrounds	
2003	Runaway: A Road Adventure	
2003	Bandits: Phoenix Rising	
2003	The Gladiators: Galactic Circus Games	
2003	Knight Rider: The Game	
2004	Midnight Nowhere	
2004	Firepower	
2004	Wings of Power: WWII Heavy Bombers and Jets	
2005	80 Days	
2006	Wings of Power II: WWII Fighters	
2007	Ghost in the Sheet	
2008	Limbo of the Lost	
2015	Bosch's Damnation	
2015	Shades of Black	
2015	Abandoned: Chestnut Lodge Asylum	
