= LocoMania =

2006 video game

- Developer: 7FX
- Publisher: Lighthouse Interactive
- Platform: Windows
- Release: PAL: February 24, 2006; NA: May 8, 2007
- Genre: Simulation
- Mode: Single-player

LocoMania is a 2006 simulation video game developed by Czech studio 7FX, published by Lighthouse Interactive. The player plays as the train dispatcher and controls switches and train directions with the intent to get the trains through the system as fast as possible. LocoMania features 12 maps, 26 trains, and 36 train carriages.

== Gameplay ==
LocoMania puts the player in the position of a train dispatcher. Various signals and railroad switches across the map can be controlled to direct the trains to their respective destinations. There are 12 different maps with varying themes and climates ranging from rocky mountain passes and deserts to country sides and industrial settings. There is also an additional small and simple map for the tutorial of the game.

The game features steam, diesel and electric locomotives, hauling both passengers as well as freight, though none of the trains are drivable. The trains move at a slow and relaxed pace, with the exception of one map containing high speed trains. The game features two loco packs, one consisting of rolling stock from theste United States and the other from the Czech rolling stock. The player can select one of the packs before starting a level.
