= Strike Fighters 2 =

2008 video game

- Developer(s): Third Wire Productions
- Publisher(s): Third Wire Productions
- Designer(s): Tsuyoshi Kawahito
- Engine: Strike Fighters
- Platform(s): Windows XP/Vista/7
- Release: NA: December 22, 2008
- Genre(s): Flight simulation
- Mode(s): Single-player

Strike Fighters 2 is a PC combat / flight simulator computer game. It primarily centers on a fictitious conflict in the Middle East between the Kingdom of Dhimar and the Empire of Paran from the late 1950s to the early 1970s. Although the countries and conflict may not be real, the aircraft and weapons used are completely accurate. The conflict is modeled as a typical Cold War era 'proxy' war between the United States and USSR where Dhimar gets help from the US and Paran uses imported Soviet equipment and expertise.

Third Wire Productions developed the game based on the original Strike Fighters: Project 1 but had to be vastly rewritten to work with the Vista platform. In doing so the latest graphical, artificial intelligence, and features were written into the simulation.

In 2009, Strike Fighters 2: Vietnam was released in April, followed in June by Strike Fighters 2: Europe detailing several possible open war scenarios in the 1960s and 1970s, and by Strike Fighters 2: Israel in October which represents the various Israel-Arab wars focusing on the Six Day War, War of Yom Kippur and the Israel-Lebanon war. Expansion Pack 1 (for Strike Fighters 2: Israel) was released in June 2010 adding the Suez Crisis and Expansion Pack 2 (for Strike Fighters 2: Europe) followed in December adding a possible 1950s scenario, both containing new 1950s craft to fly. Eventually, a Vista/7 only expansion named Strike Fighters 2: North Atlantic was released in May 2012 that added more in-depth carrier ops, better avionics, terrain, better weapon systems simulation, and more. All of the games (except the expansion packs) can be installed stand-alone, or they can be merged to make all the stock aircraft available in all games.

There is a custom campaign option.

== Story ==
The storyline of Strike Fighters is set during a fictional conflict between the Kingdom of Dhimar and the Empire of Paran. The story begins in 1919, when geologists discovered oil in the Valley of Kerman, a place at the Dhimari-Parani border. When drilling operations begin in the oil fields, Shah Mushani of Paran sends his troops across the border, beginning a long conflict between the nations.

In September 1933, Shah Mushani decides to put a halt to the conflict, following numerous attempts to capture the Mazadran oil fields. While Dhimar becomes a wealthy and economically powerful country, Paran has become poor. In February 1957, Halani Khomar, a Soviet-backed revolutionary leader, staged a bloody coup against the Mushani regime. Once in power, Khomar began building up the Parani military forces, buying the newest fighter aircraft and tanks from the Soviet Union.

King Husani Karmar al'Galbhi of Dhimar, fearing a new war, decided to approach the US for military assistance. Tensions between the two countries culminated in two years of terrorist attacks in Dhimari border cities. In June 1959, the Dhimari ports became subject to a Parani naval blockade, stopping all shipping from and to Dhimar. Prince Fa'ad al'Galbhi, commander of the Dhimari Air Force, starts an emergency buildup of air power by creating several Special Operations Wings, crewed by foreign mercenary pilots willing to fight. In July, the US dispatched US Naval and Air Force squadrons to assist their ally.
