= Delaware St. John =

Adventure video game series

- Genre: Adventure game
- Developer: Big Time Games
- Publisher: Lighthouse Interactive

Delaware St. John is the collective name given to a series of three adventure games produced by Big Time Games, which was founded in 2004. Lighthouse Interactive (now defunct) was the retail publisher for these adventure games. The story follows the adventures of psychic ghost hunting detective Delaware St. John. The series author Bryan Wiegele self-published a prequel novel in PDF (portable document format), which establishes how the primary characters Delaware and Kelly Bradford originally met.

== Development ==
=== Conception ===
Bryan Wiegele had ideas for an adventure game series for some time. While working on Whiplash he realised he missed the adventure gaming genre and began to think of what he would do in his own game. He was bothered by the flaws within Inherent Evil, a game he had worked on, and wanted to use the lessons learnt to make a better follow-up. In 2004 he fleshed out his concept for Big Time Games. One of the defining characteristics of the protagonist was for him to both be "a loner, a bit separated from society" and "likable, someone you could relate to". The name "Delaware" was chosen as its oddness appealed to Wiegele, who felt it would match the oddness of his character. Delaware St. John is a projected ten-title series.

=== Design ===
TCOMM's development began in November 2004 and was completed at the end of April 2005. Inspiration for the game's overall design include: The Beast Within, Phantasmagoria, and The 7th Guest. With a desire to have a movie-like score, Wiegele found the musician Todd Kinsley, who incidentally located the voice actors for the project. As Creative Director, Wiegele wrote, scripted, and bug tested the game. A total of 11 people worked on the project in programming, art and game scripting roles. The 2D still frames of TCOMM were upgraded to full motion 3D for TTWNN. The third title saw the implementation of the 3D engine, though it was still played from first-person perspective.

=== Release ===
Volume 1: The Curse of Midnight Manor was released on June 28, 2005 Volume 2: The Town with No Name's original release date was on November 28, 2005, but it was eventually released in December of that year. Retail release of the first two episodes by Lighthouse Interactive in various territories including North America, United Kingdom and Ireland, Benelux, Scandinavia, Russia, Australia/New Zealand, Italy, Spain, Poland, Greece and South Africa February 16, 2007. In France, the first two titles were bundled together. Work on the third game officially commenced on February 11, 2006. Volume 3: The Seacliff Tragedy would be released in June 2007 in Europe and July 2007 in North America. The Seacliff Tragedy began shipping to retail stores across the U.S. and Canada on July 24, 2007. Volume 4: Asylum of the Lost is under development but does not have a release date yet.

Bryan Wiegele and Simon Rosati set up a Kickstarter campaigns in order to fundraise for the fourth game in the series, but did not meet its goal; this was followed by some more campaigns with smaller budgets, one of these would succeed with a budget of $100,000. The developers originally wanted to make the game a 14+ hour experience, with in real-time 3D graphics, and have it available on all systems. The second campaign reflected supporters' desires to keep the game's format consistent with the previous entries by scaling back the scope and rebudgeting. The third campaign scaled back the game to 6 hours at $10,000 and removed pay for the writing, game scripting and overall production of the game, with money only going toward artists creating the assets. In doing this the developers were able to minimise development costs while producing a product worthy of the series. 6 days before the campaigns' end date, a large backer changed their pledge due to their financial situation changing, which led to the project falling below its goal.

=== Book series ===
The Delaware St. John: A Chance Meeting novel was self-published on September 24, 2010, by series author Bryan Wiegele via free downloadable PDF. This novel provides insight as to how Delaware and Kelly met as well as the telling of events leading up to the game, Volume 1: The Curse of Midnight Manor. Wiegele states: "When I originally conceived the Delaware St. John games I envisioned a series of games that followed closely behind Delaware and the mysteries that came to him. In addition I prepared the outline for a series of books that focused on what happened between these events that focused on more of the characters around him. The stories posted on the website hinted at this but never fully established the happenings taking place between the games."

== Plot and gameplay ==
The series centres around the plucky Delaware, and the mysteries that he ventures into. Gameplay consists of puzzle and inventory challenges, while the titles have in-built hint systems.

The ultimate conclusion of the 10-part narrative will see the true purpose of Delaware's powers be revealed, which results in a final confrontation between good and evil.

== Critical reception ==
=== Volume 1 ===
Gameboomers praised the title's excellent graphics and musical score. Adventure Spiele felt it was a successful scary adventure. Aventura Y Cía felt the game's "modest proposal" was as impactful as higher budget titles. Gamezebo thought the game was too short with a confusing story. One reviewer at Just Adventure gave the game an A, partly on good faith that they would follow it up with impressive sequels, though noted it would appeal to players who wanted a good scare and an intriguing mystery. A second reviewer at Just Adventure re-evaluated the game as a C when reviewing Volume 3.

=== Volume 2 ===
Adventure Spiele enjoyed the title's tense atmosphere. One reviewer at Just Adventure deemed the experience "spooky, investigative fun with surprisingly great artwork". A second reviewer at Just Adventure re-evaluated the game as a B− when reviewing Volume 3.

=== Volume 3 ===
Gameboomers thought the title was lengthier and more polished that previous volumes. Adventure Spiele felt the narrative's sense of mystery was maintained until the end. 4Players felt the intriguing concept was let down by an execution that felt dated. Gamezone recommended the title to casual adventure gamers who enjoy light adventure games, and who like TV shows like Medium and Ghost Whisperer. Gamezebo thought the story is engaging, the environment is spooky, and the puzzles are challenging. GameSpot.be noted that as a horror game, many of the screens are quite dark which makes then difficult to navigate. Jeux Video was prevented from giving a higher score due to the game's lack of atmosphere. Eric McConnell at Just Adventure wrote that while the title offers a solid gaming experience, there is still some room for improvement.
