= Avencast: Rise of the Mage =

2007 video game

- Developer: ClockStone
- Publishers: Lighthouse Interactive; Meridian4 (digital)
- Platform: Windows
- Release: November 14, 2007
- Genre: Action role-playing
- Mode: Single-player

Avencast: Rise of the Mage is an action role-playing game for Windows developed by ClockStone and published by Lighthouse Interactive. The game heavily borrows elements of beat 'em ups. This is apparent from the ability to cast spells by rapidly combining movement inputs with mouse buttons. Alternatively short cuts can be assigned for easy access of spells. Also the scheme of recurring Boss fights reflects this relation. The inclusion of riddles shows the connection to adventure games.

The game's magic and combat system features more than 50 spells and about 150 unique items can be found or bought in the game's world.

== Plot ==
The game tells the story of a young male apprentice who was raised by an old mage and sent to the Academy of Avencast to finish his studies of the arts of magic. The player takes control of the character when he is about to undergo preparations for his final exam which is to be passed in the local Crystal Caves.

Upon return to the academy, a cut scene shows the hero being chased and the academy destroyed by hostile demons. He finally reaches a haven inside the academy, where a few other NPCs have barricaded themselves. This is the starting point for the main part of the story, where he will discover his ancestry and reveal the mastermind behind the invasion of the academy.

== Gameplay ==
The gameplay comprises killing monsters to gain experience points which in turn can be spent on raising characters stats or acquiring spells. Additionally the monster's bodies can be searched for gold or equipment like weapons (primarily staffs) and armour which can be sold or used by the character. For the purpose of carrying equipment the game provides the character with an inventory and also a belt for healing and mana potions and spells. The game allows fast access to items on the belt by key-bindings. This speeds up repeatedly opening books, which is necessary for solving some of the quests.

An equal number of experience points can be achieved by finishing quests. Some quests also award the character with equipment, including unique items. Quests often contain riddles that must be solved by the player for accomplishment. These involve the activation of switches, the usage of runes to open passageways and the alignment of mirrors to focus laser like rays.

The game features a minimap that shows quest locations and automatically updates with the areas the player has visited.

Although the game features potions for healing and refilling mana, the character automatically recovers and gains both health and mana over time.

== Attributes, spells and leveling ==
The game's character sheet contains entries for health, mana, Soul Magic and Blood Magic. These attributes can be raised by distribution of level-up points, which in turn are received for reaching a new level when the current number of experience points exceeds a certain threshold.

The player can divide the level-up points between attributes and spells. A new spell can be acquired in exchange for level-up points if the required level for that spell has been reached and optional prerequired spells have been acquired earlier.

Spells are distributed in three spell trees, namely Soul Magic, Blood Magic and Summoning. Soul Magic spells are primarily ranged spells like projectiles or walls of fire. Blood Magic refers to spells that primarily increase or cause close combat damage with the staff. Spells include common ones for poisoning, inflaming or freezing. Less common spells like leeching life or tossing the opponent backwards, who in turn will knock other opponents he collides with over, are also included. The Summoning tree features spells for summoning creatures that will fight on the players side.

The attributes Soul Magic and Blood Magic increase the effectiveness of the spells in the corresponding spell trees. Additionally the Summoning spell tree is split in half. One half of the summoned creatures is improved by raising the Soul Magic attribute, the other by the Blood Magic value. The shield spell, which is also listed in the Summoning spell tree, is unaffected by those attributes and can be used for blocking the attacks of opponents.

=== Spellcasting ===
The game provides two different interface methods for spell casting. The player can either rapidly enter a combination of movement key and mouse button presses or alternatively map spells to short-cut keys. The key combinations necessary to cast a spell are indicated by arrows and symbols for the corresponding mouse button. Additionally a colour key helps to distinguish between Soul Magic (purple) and Blood Magic (red) spells. Soul Magic spells are always finished with a right-click while Blood Magic spells are completed with left-clicks on the mouse.

Spells can be placed in what are called spellcaster's assists. These are slots on the sides of the game's screen where spells can be positioned. The icons in the spellcaster's assists show the short-cut assignments and also the alternative keystroke combinations. Additionally the icon for a spell changes its colour if the character currently does not have enough mana to cast that spell.

=== Movement and camera controls ===
The game's character is viewed from the outside. The game supports different methods to control the character, including: Easy control, Expert and Follow camera.

=== Evading ===
The player can perform evasive rolls by hitting the directional movement keys twice in fast succession but the character will not regenerate mana or health while doing so for an extended amount of time.

Alternatively a crouching evasion step to one of the four basic movement directions can be taken by combining the movement key with the space key.

== Development ==
Avencast began as a hobby project to create a Diablo clone that incorporated elements of other popular past games. It was ClockStone's first game release and took about four years to complete. The game was completed with a relatively small team - ClockStone's CEO wrote the majority of the game engine himself in C++. ClockStone team members had little or no formal education in game development field.

Since the release of Avencast, ClockStone has released the development tools, allowing fans to build levels or modify the game content.

== Reception ==
Review aggregator Metacritic awarded the game a score of 68 out of 100, based on 11 reviews. The spell effects and interactive combat system, which departed from the usual point-and-click interfaces of contemporary RPGs, gained recognition. RPGFan rewarded Avencast with 81%. GameZone concluded with a rating of 7.8. On GameSpot the game achieved a score of 7.5. IGN gave the game a 7.0.
