= Wings of Power =

Add-on to Flight Simulator 2004

- Cover art of WWII Heavy Bombers and Jets
- Developer(s): Shockwave Productions
- Publisher(s): Tri Synergy
- Series: Microsoft Flight Simulator
- Platform(s): Windows
- Release: WWII Heavy Bombers and Jets; September 13, 2004; WWII Fighters; July 11, 2006
- Genre(s): Flight simulation
- Mode(s): Single-player, multiplayer

Wings of Power is a set of two flight simulation video games released as add-ons to Microsoft Flight Simulator 2004: A Century of Flight. They add vintage historical military aircraft to the game. Wings of Power: WWII Heavy Bombers and Jets was released on September 13, 2004, and adds 50 missions with some historical missions from real military pilot logs from World War II. Wings of Power II: WWII Fighters was released on July 11, 2006, and adds five aircraft: Bf 109, P-51 Mustang, Spitfire, P-47 Thunderbolt, and A6M "Zero".

== Gameplay ==
=== Wings of Power: WWII Heavy Bombers and Jets ===
The aircraft in Wings of Power: WWII Heavy Bombers and Jets include the B-17 Flying Fortress models F and G, B-29 model a Superfortress, Arado 234B Blitz, He-162 Salamander, Focke-Wulf Ta-183 Huckebein, Avro Lancaster Mk III heavy bomber, B-24 models D and J Liberator and PB4Y-2 Privateer.

This add on is strictly with pilot or copilot controls only. So there is no combat in this add on unlike Shockwave's earlier Firepower add on. However the developers added some sophisticated controls and actual pilots procedures used to start and fly these aircraft in the simulation. So they simulate how the aircraft is actually flown to a very good degree. The simulation add on comes with a good size 158 page manual detailing the controls and operable 2D panels which can be brought up on the computers screen to manually operate different control panel boxes used in the actual aircraft. However, not all the actual pilot and copilot controls of the real military aircraft are here in the simulation most notably the B-17's induction system. Unfortunately this is due to a limitation of Microsoft's Flight Simulator 2004. Even so, this add on would be useful for learning some of the operation and procedures of the actual World War II military aircraft. The simulation is designed so that the aircraft operate and fly to pretty decent flight dynamics as the real aircraft. So it can be a challenge to land a heavy World War II bomber in the simulation without crashing and there can be random failures of aircraft systems so a simulation pilot can learn what to do in certain circumstances. Shockwave Productions recommends that individuals who have purchased this obtain a copy of the pilots manual for the aircraft they choose to fly in this add on. It is easy to see why because real World War II military bomber pilots with their copilots went through checklists before takeoff with flight engineers reading off the instruments and had years of very extensive training. However, if the simulation player so chooses he doesn't have to go through these complicated procedures and controls featured. Instead the full realism can be turned off in Microsoft's flight simulator's menu. Then again the player will be missing out on a great learning experience.

=== Wings of Power II: WWII Fighters ===
The aircraft in Wings of Power II: WWII Fighters include the P-51 Mustang model D, Supermarine Spitfire Mk 1B, Republic P-47 D-20 Thunderbolt, Messerschmitt Bf 109 model E-4 and a Mitsubishi A6M5 Zero. The game simulates a drop tank release system.

This simulator add on is strictly with pilot controls only. So there is no combat in this add on. However the developers added some sophisticated controls and actual pilots procedures used to start and fly these aircraft in the simulation. So they simulate how the aircraft is actually flown to an excellent degree. The simulation add on comes with a good size chart detailing the 3D operable controls as used in the actual aircraft. As usual Shockwave Productions recommends that the user obtain the pilots manuals for each vintage aircraft for full learning enjoyment.

== Reception ==
Reception

Aggregate score
Aggregator	Score
GameRankings	88% (I); 93% (II)

Review scores
Publication	Score
GameSpot	8.2/10 (I)
GameSpy	4.5/5 (I)
IGN	8.3/10 (I)

Both games received positive reviews from critics.

=== Wings of Power: WWII Heavy Bombers and Jets ===
GameSpy said: "It's hours and hours of challenging flying; a must for fans of WWII planes or armchair aviators looking for something new and special." IGN praised the attention to detail and the level of accuracy in the plane and flight modeling. GameSpot said that "if you've ever dreamed about flying any of these bombers or jets, this is as close as you can get outside of paying exorbitant amounts of cash for a real-life flight."

=== Wings of Power II: WWII Fighters ===
Computer Gaming World summarized: "Amazing attention to detail makes this package a hardcore flight sim fan's nirvana."

== See also ==
- Firepower (computer game)
