= SunAge =

2007 video game

- Developer: Vertex4
- Publisher: Lighthouse Interactive
- Platform: PC
- Release: EU: November 30, 2007; NA: January 31, 2008
- Genre: Real Time Strategy
- Modes: Single player, Multiplayer

SunAge is real-time strategy video game developed by Austrian company Vertex4 and published by Lighthouse Interactive. It has received attention due to its use of 2D sprites and backgrounds.

== Factions ==
=== The Federacy ===
The Federacy is all that is left of the Human race, sealed off in protective domes, away from the harsh environment of future Earth. Attempting to survive on limited resources they must fight to protect their domes. By the time the game starts, there is only one dome left standing.

=== The Raak-Zun ===
The Raak-Zun are the descendants of those who were abandoned to die in the toxic wastelands when mankind retreated into the domes. After many terrible years of mutation and hardship, a new race was born with the instinct and brute force to survive the dangers of the wasteland: the Raak-Zun. Never forgetting their betrayal, they hate the Federacy above all else.

=== The Sentinel ===
The Sentinel are a race of sentient robots with unknown origin. Little is known about this faction at this time and the reason for their aggressive behavior remains a mystery. They seem to be in possession of extremely advanced technology.

== Plot ==
=== Setting ===
SunAge is set on a post-apocalyptic Earth, in which relentless total war between Earth's nations (subtly hinting to a nuclear war) have turned the planet into an irradiated wasteland, forcing the surviving humans to shelter in habitational domes to survive. However, with the passing of years, contact with most domes was lost, leaving the Federal Dome as the last one standing. It is discovered this was due to the assaults of the self-titled Raak-Zun, humans supposedly mutated from prolonged exposure to the irradiated Earth. The Federacy was able to survive so far due to the skills of their hardened commanders, whom must pass the trials of the "Blooding", a live-fire graduation exercise that involves open conflict with the Raak-Zun, to earn their rank.

=== Federacy Campaign ===
Six months following his successful graduation from the Blooding, Commander Ethan tardily returns to the Federal Dome to find it under siege from the Raak-Zun, whom breached through the tunnel system. Fighting off the invaders to the tunnel base, Ethan discovers the presence of both an unknown alien material as well as Raak-Zun mutants whom have overrun the tunnel base. Ethan learns that the science expedition responsible was mostly eliminated, but he discovers tracks leading to the surface within the wasteland, leading him to believe that the lead scientist, Lex, and her team have escaped the Raak-Zun onslaught. Despite orders from his commanding General to return to base and not intervene (as Federal High Command had decided to take the matter personally), Ethan goes rogue and conducts a rescue of Lex and her team, only for the General to arrive and arrest Ethan, being later revealed the arrest was to prevent his summary execution for disobeying orders. However, on their way home, the Federal Dome is attacked once again. Ethan marshalls his forces to push away the Raak-Zun again, only to discover a deactivated intergalactic portal that was being researched by Lex and her team.

Under orders from the General, Ethan and his company cross the portal to end up in a lush jungle world, in which the Federals name it "Elysium", but are shortly attacked afterwards by a force of extraterrestrial machines that Lex name "Sentinels". Ethan, Lex, the General and the Chief Engineer whom had been aiding Ethan all traverse the portal, but are forced to abandon it as it explodes from being destabilized beyond repair. Ten days after settling themselves in Elysium, Ethan picks up a distress call only to discover the Raak-Zun have also mysteriously managed to arrive to the new planet. Discovering a second portal from the salvaged Raak-Zun logs, the Federal forces fiercely engage the Sentinels and destroy their Mainframe to shut them down, but as they fly to the second portal they are intercepted by airborne Raak-Zun cyborgs whom shoot down most of the airforce, capturing Lex in the process. In a final confrontation that even involves the Federal forces using nuclear warheads to push through heavy defenses, Ethan and the General back the Raak-Zun tribal leader, Slavemaster Sauk, into a corner, using Lex into a hostage situation. The General proposes to let Sauk leave to Earth and his people in exchange for Lex, in which Sauk agrees and the General keeps his end of the bargain. The Federals start establishing themselves into Elysium, but still all aware that the conflict is all but over.

=== Raak-Zun Campaign ===
It is revealed Sauk, as he returns to his tribe, is immediately arrested by the orders of the Great Oracle, whom perceives him as a heretic and predicts he may provoke the "day of severance", leading to a possible Raak-Zun civil war. Sauk's brother Madok attempts pleading for Sauk's release, but it is denied until Federal forces launch a raid at the monolith where Sauk is imprisoned. After fighting off the invading humans, Madok gains the permission from the Oracle to release Sauk and allow him back to the tribe under strict watch from Grull, Madok's loyal Golgotha. When a border outpost is attacked while Madok conducts a massive assault to the Federal Dome, Sauk takes the chance to lead a counterstrike and restore his honor until he comes across a strange pit, thriving with luminous yellow tentacles. Despite Grull's warning, Sauk allows himself to be taken and swallowed by an aberration, believing it is a manifestation of the mutant god Raak, and then transports his forces to Elysium, where he engages both Sentinel and Federal forces and takes the General hostage for interrogation, reminding the General's folly of letting Sauk alive when he kept Lex hostage.

Grull returns to Madok to warn him of Sauk's betrayal, as the Raak-Zun stay divided between Sauk and the Oracle's followers, and Madok leads his forces alongside Grull in an attempted crusade to eliminate Sauk before the Oracle grows too weak. However, the attack is failed as Madok and Grull are captured and brought before Sauk, whom then kills Madok by tearing his heart apart, letting Grull leave to take the corpse back to Earth for burial. Sauk's forces push though the remaining Federal defenders to an underground Sentinel facility entrance at the same time Grull fights back the Federal forces at the shrine where Sauk was first arrested, to bury Madok. However, the Oracle also passes away after being long drained by Sauk's aberration. At the underground site, Sauk discovers that the aberration is actually an enormous being imprisoned by the Sentinels. Securing it, Sauk discovers he must sacrifice himself to ascend into the aberration, which he does. The aberration awakes and starts draining life out of Elysium.

=== Sentinel Campaign ===
With multiple Sentinel installations and mainframes falling, the lead Sentinel AI activates the last remaining Mainframe and pushes back the Raak-Zun invaders from within the underground facility while directing its drones to observing and capturing a target specimen, revealed to be Ethan. Ethan is captured, wiped of his memories and transformed into a Symbiont, whom spearheads the counterattack on both Federal and Raak-Zun forces, forcing Lex and the Chief Engineer to retreat to Earth, destroying their portal in the process. The Symbiont also activates a series of mainframes turned into detonators as a safety measure to destroy Elysium, identified as 'Trap 757'.

Afterwards, the Symbiont manages to establish contact with the stranded Sentinel drones on Earth allowing them to repair a portal on their side, allowing the Symbiont to travel to Earth in pursuit of a Parasite, revealed to be the aberration which had gripped Sauk and the Oracle, being discovered as an interplanetary being that travels between planets, leeching life and twisting lifeforms to perform its bidding, essentially creating the Raak-Zun. As the Symbiont fights through Federal and Raak-Zun forces, the Federals under Lex and the Chief Engineer discover the Parasite bursting itself within the Federal Dome, attempting to escape Elysium, learning Trap 757 is an anti-Parasite trap, and thus order their remaining forces to stand down, allowing the Sentinels to overcome the Raak-Zun defenders and force the Parasite away and back to Elysium, which detonates in time to destroy it. With their function fulfilled, the Sentinels, including the Symbiont, deactivate themselves, becoming inert.

In the aftermath, as the Raak-Zun remainders scatter and the Federals rebuild their dome, Lex investigates the deactivated Symbiont, determining it has been attempting to access a certain data file that the leading Sentinel AI constantly attempted to erase, but the Symbiont replicated itself non-stop. As Lex access the file, discovering Ethan is the Symbiont, the safety protocols are broken. Because of this, the Symbiont awakes, its breathing sound indicating Ethan had returned.

== Reception ==
The game's original European launch was met with significant criticism over a large number of bugs and the absence of multiplayer, amongst other things. After several patches a number of early bugs have been resolved, and a multiplayer mode introduced, however recent reviews continue to conclude that the game remains mediocre. On the other hand, there are some more positive reviews mainly from smaller and independent reviewing sites.
