= Undercover: Operation Wintersun =

2006 video game

- Developer: Sproing Interactive Media
- Publisher: Lighthouse Interactive
- Designer: Georg Heinz
- Platform: Microsoft Windows
- Release: EU: September 2006; NA: September 4, 2007
- Genre: Adventure
- Mode: Single-player

Undercover: Operation Wintersun (German: Undercover: Operation Wintersonne) is an adventure game developed by Sproing Interactive Media and published by Lighthouse Interactive. It was released in North America on September 4, 2007.

The player is placed in control of Dr. John Russell, a British nuclear physicist, who is charged with finding German atomic weaponry undercover by MI-6. The game features a number of puzzles which the player must solve to progress, and the professor is required to use items that he has picked up throughout his exploration. Undercover: Operation Wintersun received mixed reviews from critics; it received a 57% and a 62.80% from Metacritic and GameRankings respectively. Much of the criticism focused on the game's difficulty. A spin-off, Undercover: Dual Motives, was published by ANACONDA on the Nintendo DS in Germany in 2007.

== Gameplay ==
The player character analyzes a scene in hope of finding clues and resources that can be used later in the game.

Undercover: Operation Wintersun is a point-and-click adventure game set in the middle of World War II. The player character, Dr. John Russell, a nuclear physicist, is tasked by MI-6 to uncover the progress of German atomic bomb-making capabilities and to destroy one of the first German nuclear weapon prototypes to be detonated in Stalingrad by the SS.

The game requires players to interact with the environment using the mouse. The player must click on objects in order for the professor to interact with them inside of the game. The visuals use static 2D backgrounds which the player's 3D player character moves inside. Once the player clicks on an item, the professor moves to it and interacts with it, sometimes picking it up if it is usable (although not every item that is picked up can be used to solve puzzles). The game contains a novice mode, which allows the game to highlight all of the interactive objects available in-game.

== Reception ==
Reception

Aggregate scores
Aggregator	Score
GameRankings	62.8% (15 reviews)
Metacritic	57% (15 reviews)

Review scores
Publication	Score
Adventure Gamers	3.5 of 5
GameSpot	3 of 10
IGN	6.5 of 10

Undercover: Operation Wintersun has garnered mixed reviews from critics; it has received a 57% and a 62.8% from Metacritic and GameRankings respectively. Criticism of the game focused on a number of different issues. GameSpot referred to one of the game's first puzzles, where the player must pick up a potato from a garbage can in order to distract a crow so the player can listen into a conversation, as part of "a greatest-hits collection of maddening adventure-game absurdities". IGN referred to the puzzles as "fairly logical and genuinely challenging" and Adventure Gamers noted that although most of the puzzles were easy to figure out, some of them devolved into pixel hunts, or just random clicking in the hope of finding the necessary object to progress. IGN focused its criticism on the game's voice acting, which it noted was "some of the least enthusiastic voice acting we've heard this year". GameSpot and IGN also both noted the game's tendency to be extremely buggy, with the game crashing several times toward the end of play.

Praise focused on the game's unique storyline and high visual quality. Adventure Gamers called the production values "reasonably high quality", and GameSpot noted that despite the game's shortcomings, the noir-style story kept its interest.
