= Gunmetal (video game) =

1998 video game

- Developer: Mad Genius Software
- Publishers: Mad Genius Software; Tri Synergy
- Designer: Mike Jackson
- Engine: FSDS Engine
- Platforms: MS-DOS, Windows
- Release: NA: August 28, 1998
- Genre: First-person shooter
- Modes: Single-player, multiplayer

Gunmetal is a first-person shooter video game for the MS-DOS and Windows. It was developed and distributed by Mad Genius Software in 1998.

== Plot ==
The game takes place 300 years in the future. The world is completely controlled by corporations, and the concept of nation is unknown.

The player takes on the role of a newly hired security guard for the Nataka Corporation, a multi-planet organization patterned loosely after mid-20th century Conglomerates such as Siemens A.G., Sara Lee, or General Electric.

The game is focused around the player completing various missions, that become increasingly more chaotic as the player finds themselves caught up in a battle against a rogue computer virus.

== Gameplay ==
Gunmetal has 24 published levels, along with two secret levels, four deathmatch-specific levels, and one easter egg minigame. An additional deathmatch level was added in a later patch release.

Between each level, the player is told a bit about the challenges in the upcoming level through a mission briefing. They can then choose to visit an upgrade area where they can buy, sell, and trade weapons, ammo, and vehicle types to use in the mission. A limited amount of credits are given at the start of the game, but by salvaging destroyed enemy RPVs or earning "good employee" bonuses, the player can eventually afford a wide range of weaponry.

The easter egg is side-scrolling minigame called "Gandhi Kong," done in the style of Donkey Kong and starring Mahatma Gandhi.

=== Game engine ===
Gunmetal's game engine was developed by Mad Genius Software. It was not, as many people at the time suspected, a Doom clone (although both the engine and game were heavily influenced by Doom as well as Duke Nukem 3D, among other contemporary titles of the time). It includes realistic lighting, spotlights, direct sunlight, and partial reflectivity (for reflections in pools and other details). At the time, very few video games had all of these features. It also featured original digital music that was not redbook audio but streamed in real time, and it dynamically changed based on the current state of a level (like where you were currently at or if you were facing down a major enemy).

Gunmetal supports the full range of multiplayer options available in 1998. As many as eight players can play over a LAN or the Internet at once, and a split-screen 2-player mode is available for local and online play. As of the final patch release, however, online play was reportedly still broken and players were limited to the LAN option or local split-screen.

== Development ==
The game was showcased at E3 1998.

== Reception ==
Reception

Aggregate score
Aggregator	Score
GameRankings	63%

Review scores
Publication	Score
GameSpot	6.4/10
PC Accelerator	4/10
PC Gamer (UK)	71%

The game received mixed reviews according to the review aggregation website GameRankings.
