= Footmouse =

Computer mouse operated with feet

A footmouse (or foot mouse) is a type of computer mouse that gives the users the ability to move the cursor and click the mouse buttons with their feet.

It is primarily used by users with disabilities or with high-back or neck problems. It is also promoted as a way to prevent such problems in the future and as a means to increase productivity by not having to move one's hand between the keyboard and mouse.

== Types ==
There are about ten types of footmouse. Not all of them are commercially available. Some specialized companies design their own foot controlled mouse for disabled people.

The main difference between the different types of footmouse is a flat pedal which slides or a pedal which tilts. There also exists a mouse adapter which converts a conventional mouse to a footmouse that slides and horizontally tilts to one side. A footmouse that uses sliding can be a slipper with a mouse connected to it, or a special frame in which a pedal can move around. Also a tiny magnet or other location device can be used on a tablet. A footmouse that uses a tilting pedal has one or two pedals which are able to tilt and turn in one or more directions. Buttons that are pushed by the feet are not considered footmice.

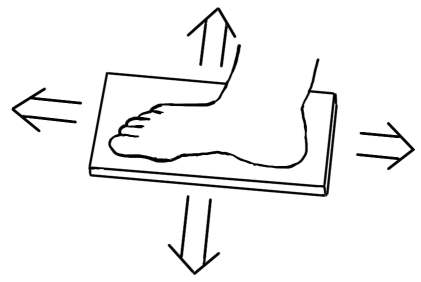
Footmouse that slides in four directions.

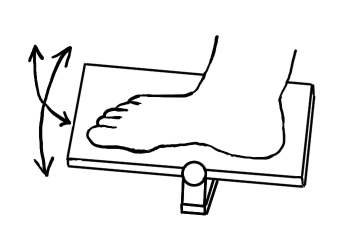
Footmouse that tilts and rotates.

== Use ==
Using a footmouse is slower than a regular mouse (a handmouse), since most people have less control over precise movements with their feet and legs than with their hands. (Human-computer interaction researchers note even though people commonly use foot pedals to control cars, sewing machines, or speech transcription equipment, foot-operated controls are used in these applications for starting and stopping, rather than navigating.)

If the footmouse is used together with a keyboard, the cursor can be moved around while typing, so there is no time wasted for moving the hand between the keyboard and the mouse. If a person cannot use a keyboard, a virtual keyboard on the screen can be used to type text by clicking each character on the virtual keyboard. People who also have less control over their foot and leg movement and are unable to operate a footmouse can sometimes use a few switches for setting the cursor in a certain direction.

If a footmouse is used incorrectly for a long time, it can cause muscle cramp in the legs, and can have a negative influence on lower back problems.

== History ==
Footmice were available in the US market as early as 1985. The manufacturer that promoted them at the time was called Versatron.

== See also ==
- Dance pad, a foot control device used in some computer games
