= Ship Simulator =

2006 video game

Ship Simulator 2006
- Australian cover art
- Developer: VSTEP
- Publishers: PAL: Lighthouse Interactive; NA: Dreamcatcher Interactive
- Platform: Microsoft Windows
- Release: EU: June 15, 2006; NA: August 21, 2006; AU: 2006
- Genre: Vehicle simulation
- Mode: Single-player

Ship Simulator is a ship simulator, a type of vehicle simulation computer game which simulates maneuvering various ships in different environments, although without the effects of wind and current. It was developed by Dutch company VSTEP and released by the now defunct company Lighthouse Interactive.

== Ship Simulator 2006 ==
The first version of Ship Simulator was released in 2006 and was titled Ship Simulator 2006. The user can steer various ships, amongst others a Rotterdam water taxi, a container ship and even the ill-fated RMS Titanic, in various weather conditions and in three real-life harbours, which are Rotterdam, Hamburg and Phi Phi Islands in Thailand; a fourth harbour, New York City was later released as a free download. A game element is added to the simulation by means of forty "missions" which have to be completed as fast or as accurately as possible. Users can also design their own missions, and share with others. The game has a built-in scenario editor to create new missions.

The Official Ship Simulator 2006 Add-On was released in February 2007. This is an expansion pack with six additional ships and extra features such as ship walk-throughs.

== Series ==
Ship Simulator 2008 released in July 2007 in Germany and the UK. It contains seven ports and eight open sea environments. This version also features waves, weather, day/night time transitions, damage to vessels, and new boats and ships. There are six new ships; a supertanker, a Solent ferry, large ocean ferry, a new patrol boat and two new tugs. There is also a Ship Simulator Professional V2.0

The Titanic has also undergone some minor changes for example the second class stairwell and the stern section are visitable, as well and the original ships have been updated. Free add-ons were reportedly available, including a hovercraft, jetski, barge, improved physics and possibly another environment.

An official expansion for Ship Simulator 2008 titled Ship Simulator 2008 New Horizons was released in April, 2008. The add-on features eight new ships, the addition of multiplayer functionality, a new sailing area (Padstow, Cornwall), twenty new missions, in game downloading of new missions, option to connect and disconnect barges to the pushboat in-game, and new walkthrough options.

Ship Simulator Extremes is the name of the latest installment in the Ship Simulator series. It was released on August 27, 2010.

Additions to the game include new locations around the world from cold Antarctica to warm Bora Bora as well as new ships (including official licensed Greenpeace vessels) and new dynamic and more realistic weather and water systems. Most vessels from Ship Simulator 2008 are also part of the choice of ships. The cruise ship "Ocean Star" from Ship Simulator 2006/2008 is also included, except outside colors have changed and the name changed to "Orient Star". Vessels have more usable controls and more realistic ones, unlike Ship Simulator 2008 in which only the whistle, binoculars, thrust, rudder and thrusters (if applicable on the vessel) are usable, although you can listen to the ship's radio but not send out calls. Sinking dynamics and physics have also improved in Ship Simulator Extremes. Also unlike Ship Simulator 2008, you can launch lifeboats/motorboats off a suitable vessel. Following a campaign by members of their growing fanbase, VSTEP agreed to include the ports of Dover and Calais (in one environment).

== Peripherals ==
A "ship control unit", designed specifically for Ship Simulator and enabling more realistic steering, was released in 2006 by Wilco Publishing. P.I. Engineering have announced "ShipDriver", a marine simulation controller based on their RailDriver train controller for Auran's Trainz and Microsoft's Train Simulator. ShipDriver released in winter 2010.

== Critical reception ==
Ship Simulator has been criticised for limitations in the replication of realistic controls and the lack of open architecture preventing users from creating their own vehicles and voyages. "Slow and mundane gameplay" and bugs have also been cited. Reviewers did comment that the game is challenging and that it has educational value. In addition, reviewers also praised the attention to detail for the scenery and boats.
