= Wiggins in Storyland =

1994 educational video game

- Developer(s): Virgin Sound and Vision
- Publisher(s): Virgin Sound and Vision
- Programmer(s): Kristina Tiara; Thorunn Sigfusdottir
- Platform(s): MS-DOS, Windows
- Release: 1994
- Genre(s): Educational
- Mode(s): Single-player

Wiggins in Storyland is an educational video game for MS-DOS and Windows published by Virgin Sound and Design in 1994. The game centers around a green bookworm named Wiggins and features voice acting by Doug Preis, Joseph Siravo, Eden Rigal, Richmond Hoxie, Polly Adams, and Daniel Rysnyder.

== Gameplay ==
Wiggins in Storyland features little actual gameplay. Players can write stories and poems using a wide assortment of animated backgrounds, animated characters, props, and background music. The game was designed to allow children to freely write stories without being boggled by more complicated tools such as Microsoft Word. The game included over 40 characters (Including Wiggins, the main worm, Jenkins, the ghost, and the honker), 110 props, eight different story themes, multiple type fonts, and 40 different sound effects and background music. In short, the player is presented with a book taking up mostly the entire screen, wherein the leftmost page could be written on whilst the rightmost was left empty. A toolbar at the top of the screen allowed the player to drag props and such onto the rightmost page to help illustrate the story. The player may manipulate the animated characters in various ways—such as changing their size, facial expression, and mood. Other than that, the player can even record their story and hear it played back aloud.

In addition to the story-writing section, the player may enter "Wiggins' Library", a point-and-click activity room. Activities within the library include painting the room, playing musical instruments, shooting peas with a spoon, and making fruit juices for Wiggins to drink. Aside from all this, the window or rug can be clicked on to either play Tic-Tac-Toe or "The A-Maze-ing Rug"—a game in which the player attempts to catch the "bad guy" before the clock reaches zero.
