= Third Wire =

American company

Third Wire Productions, Inc.
- Company type: Private
- Industry: Video games
- Founded: 1999
- Founder: Tsuyoshi Kawahito
- Headquarters: Austin, Texas, United States
- Products: Strike Fighters series Wings Over series
- Website: thirdwire.com

Third Wire Productions Inc. is a C corporation based in Austin, Texas, United States; it is an independent software development company founded in 1999 to create multimedia entertainment, such as amateur flight simulators and strategy video games.

== Products ==
Third Wire is the developer of many computer games, including First Eagles: The Great War 1918 and Strike Fighters: Project 1. There are other products outside of the combat sim genre, a notable example of these projects is First Flight: The Wright Experience Flight Simulator, which is a Wright brothers' Flyer simulator for reenactors.

- Strike Fighters: Project 1 (2002)
- First Flight: The Wright Experience Flight Simulator (2003): A training tool developed for Wright Experience Centennial test pilots and now available for the public.
- Strike Fighters: Gold (2004)
- Wings Over Vietnam (2004)
- USAF: Air Dominance (2005): A recruitment game developed for the US Air Force (not for public sale).
- Wings Over Europe (2006)
- First Eagles: The Great War 1918 (2006)
- First Eagles: Expansion Pack 1 (2007)
- Wings Over Israel (2008)
- First Eagles: Gold (2008): A combo pack containing First Eagles and Expansion Pack 1.
- Strike Fighters 2 (2008): An update to Strike Fighters: Project 1 to run on Windows Vista.
- Strike Fighters 2: Vietnam (2009): An update to Wings Over Vietnam to run on Windows Vista.
- Strike Fighters 2: Europe (2009): An update to Wings Over Europe to run on Windows Vista.
- Strike Fighters 2: Israel (2009): An update to Wings Over Israel to run on Windows Vista with Direct X 10 support.
- First Eagles 2 (2010): An update to First Eagles: Gold to run on Windows Vista and Windows 7.
- Strike Fighters 2: Expansion Pack 1 (2010): First of the expansion packs for Strike Fighters 2 series, requires Strike Fighters 2 Israel stand-alone or merged with other Strike Fighters 2 series to run, adds Operation Kadesh, and 3 new flyable planes: Mystère IVA, Meteor F.8, and P-51D Mustang.
- Wings Over Israel Add-on (2010): an add-on to the Wings Over Israel, it adds Mystère IVA, Meteor F.8, and P-51D Mustang as player-flyable aircraft.
- Strike Fighters 2: Expansion Pack 2 (2010): Second of the expansion packs for Strike Fighters 2 series, requires Strike Fighters 2 Europe stand-alone or merged with other Strike Fighters 2 series to run, adds a hypothetical 1956 campaign, and 3 new flyable planes, as well as several variants: English Electric Lightning F.1/2/3/6, Hawker Hunter F.1/2/4/5, F-100A/C.
- Strike Fighters 2: North Atlantic (2012): New title in the Strike Fighter series to include new terrain engine, better graphics and F-14A Tomcat as player flyable.
- Strike Fighters 2: Expansion Pack 3 (TBD): Third expansion pack will add the Mirage F1 as a player flyable aircraft.

== See also ==
- Jane's AH-64D Longbow
- Jane's Longbow 2
- European Air War
