= Westlanders =

- Cover art
- Developer: The Breach Studios
- Publisher: Team17
- Platforms: Windows; PlayStation 5; Xbox Series X/S
- Release: 2027
- Modes: Single-player, multiplayer

Westlanders is a video game set to be released in 2027, developed by The Breach Studios and published by Team17.

== Gameplay and themes ==
Westlanders features gameplay elements such as city-building construction and management simulation gameplay in a Western setting. The game is set to feature single-player and multiplayer cooperative gameplay. Players are able to experience base building mechanics as well as survival mechanics that require that player character to deal with enemies as well as surviving natural events such as illnesses and weather.

The game also includes crafting, construction, and customization, such as updating the look of the player's wagon. The player also uses various tools in the process of placing buildings and expanding bases. As built locations expand, players can use allies to strengthen their help settlements.

== Marketing and release ==
Westlanders was announced in December 2025. It is set to be released in early access in 2027, with a Kickstarter campaign launching as well.
