= Wings Over Europe =

2006 video game

- Developer: Third Wire
- Publishers: NA: Bold Games; PAL: Empire Interactive
- Designer: Tsuyoshi Kawahito
- Platform: Windows
- Release: NA: May 24, 2006; EU: September 15, 2006; AU: October 19, 2006
- Genre: Flight simulation
- Modes: Single-player, multiplayer

Wings Over Europe is a combat flight simulator game set during the Cold War era where the USSR has attacked NATO forces in West Germany. It was developed by Third Wire Productions and released for Microsoft Windows in 2006.

The US release of the game is called Wings Over Europe: Cold War Gone Hot, however, the tag line is changed to Wings Over Europe: Soviet Invasion for the European market. The time period covered is 1962 to 1984.

The game includes a wide variety of real jets and weapons from the era which can be employed in various mission types such as Combat Air Patrol, Interception, Close Air Support, Iron Hand, Wild Weasel, and Reconnaissance.

The game is based on the Strike Fighters: Project 1 engine.

In 2009, an updated version for the Windows Vista platform called Strike Fighters 2 Europe was released. The original game, however, is still compatible with Vista and Windows 7.

== Background ==
Wings Over Europe was released in 2006 and was the fourth in a series of "Lite" Flight Simulators. The term "Lite" was applied because they are designed to be relatively easy to learn and play compared to other more hardcore types of flight simulator.

The developer took and improved on its existing Strike Fighters game engine and thus the game was another step forward in terms of quality and game play. The game included better graphics, more planes, improved campaigns, and simulated clouds.

== Gameplay ==
Despite the "Lite" tag, a fair amount of realism has been built in; 1960s-style bombsights are simulated for the pre 1970's aircraft rather than modern computer-aided aiming reticles. Dive bombing and level bombing techniques have to be worked out by the game player if they are to have success at completing missions.

Aircraft that come into service after 1970 have advanced Head Up Displays that allow the player to aim bombs with more accuracy than manual dive bombing techniques. Laser Guided bombs such as the GBU-12 Paveway are included; so are the A and B versions of the AGM-65 Maverick, allowing much easier ground target destruction for the late 1970s aircraft.

US Air to Air missiles in the game consist of versions of the AIM-9 Sidewinder, AIM-7 Sparrow, and AIM-4 Falcon which are simulated to be as unreliable as the real missiles were. Regardless of having a "good lock on the target" there is a good chance the missile will miss. Missiles from 1978 onwards such as the AIM-9L version of the Sidewinder are much improved and more likely to score a hit.

Dogfights are usually close in affairs regardless of the time period, but as the missiles get better over time, longer range kills can be achieved.

The map of Germany has been scaled down slightly so that there is less time spent flying to a target, and also because air-to-air refuelling is not included in the game. The lack of water on the map has meant that aircraft carrier operations have not been included this time.

During a mission the players will fly in a flight of aircraft in which the computer-controlled planes keep in formation as they fly to a target. This flight can be issued commands; attack other aircraft or ground targets, fly home if they are damaged, or jettison their drop tanks. As they fly many other computer-controlled aircraft will be up in the air and can be viewed as they engage in dogfights or bomb targets.

Flying over Soviet held East Germany the player's aircraft will be met with a high level of radar guided Surface to Air Missiles (SAMS), and a variety of lethal Anti-Aircraft Artillery (AAA). The main SAMs are the soviet SA-2 and SA-6, of which early and later versions are included in the game increasing lethality accordingly.

The player can select a fictitious campaign from either Red Thunder (1962), Red Hammer (1968), or Red Lightning (1979), each being from a different time era with different aircraft and weapons forcing the player to employ different tactics in each.

Single Missions are also available, which can be customised to allow the player to practice with specific aircraft and weapons.

== Development ==
This series of games is designed by Tsuyoshi Kawahito (known as 'TK'), who was also involved in some of the 1990s best selling PC flight simulators, including European Air War (1998) by MicroProse and Longbow 2 (1997) by Jane's Combat Simulations.

== Reception ==
Reception

Aggregate score
Aggregator	Score
Metacritic	62/100

Review scores
Publication	Score
Eurogamer	6/10
PC Format	52%
PC Gamer (UK)	59%
PC Gamer (US)	64%
PC Zone	52%

The game received "mixed" reviews according to the review aggregation website Metacritic.
