= Wings Over Israel =

2008 video game

- Developer: Third Wire Productions
- Publisher: Third Wire Productions
- Designer: Tsuyoshi Kawahito
- Engine: Strike Fighters
- Platform: Windows
- Release: NA: Feb 18, 2008
- Genre: Flight simulation
- Modes: Single-player, multiplayer

Wings Over Israel (also titled Combat Over Israel in some European markets) is a 2008 combat flight simulator computer game for Microsoft Windows covering the three major Middle Eastern conflicts of the 20th century: the Six-Day War (1967), the Yom Kippur War (1973) and the Lebanon War (1982).

The game includes a wide variety of real jets and weapons from the era, which can be employed in various mission types such as Combat Air Patrol, Interception, Close Air Support, Escort, Defense Suppression, and Reconnaissance. The game is based on the Strike Fighters engine and was developed by Third Wire Productions.

== Background ==
This series of games is designed by Tsuyoshi Kawahito (known as 'TK'), who was also involved in some of the 1990s best-selling PC flight simulators, including European Air War (1998) by MicroProse and Longbow 2 (1997) by Jane's Combat Simulations.

Wings Over Israel was released in 2008 as part of the Strike Fighters series of "lite" flight simulators developed by Third Wire Productions. The term "lite" was applied because they are designed to be relatively easy to learn and play compared to other more "hardcore" flight simulators.

The game is set in the Middle East from 1967 to 1982, with the player flying IDF/AF jet fighters in three historical campaigns. The developer improved on its existing Strike Fighters engine and thus the game was another step forward in terms of quality and gameplay.

== Gameplay ==
Despite the "lite" tag, a fair amount of realism has been built into the game; 1960s-style bombsights are simulated for the pre-1970s aircraft rather than modern computer-aided aiming reticules. Dive bombing and level bombing techniques have to be worked out by the player if they are to have success at completing missions.

Aircraft that came into service after 1970 had advanced Head-Up Displays that allowed the player to aim bombs with more accuracy than manual dive bombing techniques. The A and B versions of the AGM-65 Maverick allow much easier ground target destruction for the late-1970s aircraft.

Israeli air-to-air missiles in the game consist of versions of the AIM-9 Sidewinder, AIM-7 Sparrow, Matra 530, Shafrir-2, and Python-3. Early missiles are simulated to be as unreliable as the real missiles were, so regardless of having a "good lock on the target" there is a good chance the missile will still miss. Later-model missiles from such as the AIM-9L version of the Sidewinder are much improved and more likely to score a hit. Dogfights are usually close-up affairs regardless of the time period, but as the missiles get better over time, longer-range kills can be achieved.

During a mission, the players will fly in a flight of aircraft, in which the computer-controlled planes keep in formation as they fly to a target. This flight can be issued various commands: attack other aircraft or ground targets, fly home if they are damaged, or jettison their drop tanks. As they fly, many other computer-controlled aircraft will be up in the air and can be viewed as they engage in dogfights or bomb targets.

Flying over Egyptian or Syrian territories, the player's aircraft will be met with a high level of radar-guided Surface-to-Air Missiles (SAM), and a variety of lethal Anti-Aircraft Artillery (AAA). The main SAMs are the soviet SA-2 and SA-6, of which early and later versions are included in the game, increasing lethality accordingly.

The player can select a historical campaign from either the Six-Day War (1967), the October War (1973), or the Lebanon War (1982), each being from a different era with different aircraft and weapons, forcing the player to employ different tactics in each. Individual missions are also available, which can generate random missions.

== Reception ==
IGN critic Gord Goble rated the game an 8 out of 10, praising its gameplay.
