= War World (video game) =

2005 video game

- Developer: Third Wave Games
- Publishers: Third Wave Games, Flashman Studios (Xbox 360), Lighthouse Interactive (Windows, Europe)
- Designers: Morten Brodersen; Johnni Christensen; Phillip Tavel
- Programmer: Morten Brodersen
- Artist: Johnni Christensen
- Composers: Mason B. Fisher (Windows), David Wise (Xbox 360)
- Platforms: Microsoft Windows, Xbox 360 (XBLA)
- Release: Windows: NA: August 2, 2005; EU: March 17, 2006; Xbox 360: WW: October 1, 2008
- Genres: Action, First-person Shooter
- Modes: Single player, Multiplayer

War World: Tactical Combat (also known as simply War World) is a 3D mech combat simulator game developed and published by Australian company Third Wave Games (who are made up of former Rare alumni who have been involved in the development of such games as Banjo-Kazooie, Donkey Kong 64, and others). It was released on Microsoft Windows in 2005, and 2008 for the Xbox Live Arcade service. A version for the original Xbox was planned but got cancelled.

== Story ==
The story revolves around a planet within the Milky Way galaxy known as WarWorld. This planet has been under perpetual conflict throughout its known history over various reasons (ranging from religious differences to territorial disputes to blood feuds between different sects of the inhabitants). However, eventually the largest groups of these people would form into corporate entities and would establish several neutral cities on the planet in the hopes of establishing commerce with the outside galaxy. When the game first starts, 7 of these city-states will have already been formed exporting all sorts of variants of their warlike nature from mercenaries to military hardware to gladiatorial arena games using mechs. The player assumes the role of one of these arena competitors as they fight their way through various battles with competing clans or mech pilots in the game.

== Gameplay ==
Gameplay is similar to the Tribes first-person shooter games even though the game is classified as a Mech sim much like the MechAssault series of games. Despite this, some commonalities can be found between the two sims such as collecting powerups and some interface design choices. The gameplay focuses on teamwork and squad-based FPS tactics throughout the entire experience. Mechs are designed in a garage interface at different intervals depending on what type of game you're playing at the time. Within this interface, players can purchase mechs and spare parts using currency earned called credits. Credits can be earned over the course of a single player game or dictated based on the requirements set up ahead of time on a multiplayer game. War World has the single and multi player options, and includes game modes such as "capture the flag" and "team deathmatch".

== Mech units ==
All mech units in War World share certain commonalities that can be termed as a unit's stats. These stats include Armor (or the amount of health a unit has before dying), Jump (how high a unit can jump without the assistance of a thruster), the speed of a unit, a multiplier to how much ammo each weapon on the unit has (based on the weapon's baseline stats), and the cost of a unit in terms of credits (the currency in the game). All mechs come with a radar stealth function that allows them to disappear off an opponent's radar screens. However, this does not make a unit invisible to sight and can be spotted normally even with the stealth option turned on. In addition, a unit can be altered in terms of paint or color scheme in order to change its appearance.

There are five different mech units in the game (as of Version 1.9.02) that a player can choose from; the Panther 770, the Python KX5, the Thunder B-2, the Assault T1000 and the Leviathan.

The game also features dropships - combat cargo planes that can deliver new mech units to the battlefield over the course of a match. Typically in single player mode, they will be seen flying over the entire arena attacking the player and dropping in new units. A dropship has multiple minigun like turrets all around the vessel that fire low damage rounds at various intervals (depending on the difficulty level) and has twice as much armor as the Leviathan mech. Mechs are unloaded from the rear of the plane through the use of a drop down ramp that folds out. As of version 1.9 these are only controllable by the AI and not by players.

== Reception ==
Reception

Aggregate score
Aggregator	Score	
Aggregator	PC	Xbox 360
Metacritic	74/100	45/100

Review scores
Publication	Score	
Publication	PC	Xbox 360
1Up.com	N/A	D+
Eurogamer	N/A	4/10
GamePro	N/A	2.75/5
GameSpot	N/A	4/10
GameZone	8.6/10	N/A
IGN	N/A	5/10
Official Xbox Magazine (US)	N/A	6/10
PALGN	7/10	N/A
PC Gamer (UK)	70%	N/A
TeamXbox	N/A	3.9/10

The PC version received "average" reviews, while the Xbox 360 version received "generally unfavorable reviews", according to the review aggregation website Metacritic.
