= We Are Chicago =

2017 video game

- Developer: Culture Shock Games
- Publisher: Culture Shock Games
- Director: Michael Block
- Platform: Microsoft Windows
- Release: WW: February 9, 2017
- Mode: Single-player

We Are Chicago is an adventure simulation video game developed and published by American developer Culture Shock Games for Microsoft Windows. It was released on February 9, 2017.

== Gameplay ==
We Are Chicago is a video game set in the South Side of Chicago. The player assumes the role of Aaron, a black teenager dealing with the struggles of poverty and living in an area populated by gangs.

== Development ==
The game began as a thought experiment about how to use the video game medium to tell true stories. The developers were further spurred by reading "slice-of-life-type books" based on people's accounts of living in the South Side of Chicago during the 80's and 90's, as well as volunteering with groups and talking with people. During this time, they found that a lot of people's issues stemmed from a history of redlining and race-based income inequality (which leads to exacerbations of other problems).

During production, Culture Shock founder Michael Block and his team gathered at transit locations in the Englewood neighborhood of Chicago to interview its citizens regarding the problems they faced. They were told stories about the problems faced by these citizens, which included unemployment rates, as well as their portrayal in local media, all of which became the focal point of the video game.

== Reception ==
Reception

Aggregate score
Aggregator	Score
Metacritic	49/100

Review score
Publication	Score
Destructoid	3/10

We Are Chicago received "generally unfavorable" reviews, according to review aggregator Metacritic. Destructoid rated the game a 3/10, criticizing the graphics for its lack of polish and its characters for lack of emotion. Polygon gave the game a 7/10, praising the game's representation of the characters but criticizing character movement. Kotaku stated the game failed to address the broad issue of violence, citing a speech from local activist Ja'mal Green.
