= OMSI 2 =

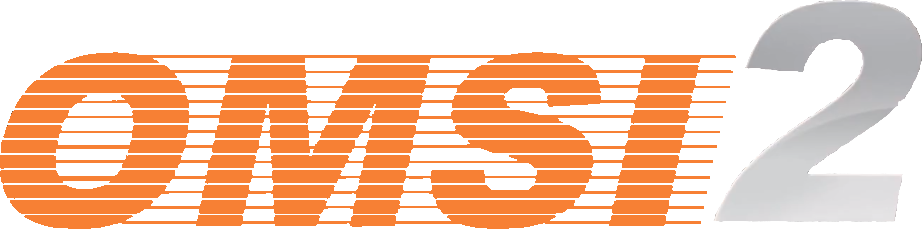
- Developer: M-R Software GbR
- Publisher: Aerosoft GmbH
- Engine: Open Dynamics Engine
- Platform: Windows
- Release: December 11, 2013
- Genre: Vehicle simulation
- Mode: Single-player

OMSI 2 is a bus simulation game developed by German studio M-R Software GbR and published by Aerosoft. It has only been available on Microsoft Windows through Steam, since the game's release, December 11, 2013.

It is the successor to OMSI: The Bus Simulator, released in 2011, first published by Aerosoft on DVD. M-R Software has since dissolved but DLC continues to be produced.

== Gameplay ==
The base game comes with two maps, both based in Germany, and one bus manufacturer, MAN, offering buses such as the MAN NL202, SD200 and SD202. The Berlin-Spandau map is one of the two maps, recreated on a 1:1 scale, and is set from 1986 to 1994. Grundorf, the other map OMSI offers, comes with a small, fictional map, and only one short route. It is also the map used for the tutorials.

== Reception ==
Reception

Review score
Publication	Score
Multiplayer.it	5/10

Writing for Rock Paper Shotgun, Tim Stone remarked positively on the game's recreated environments, described it as more accessible than the first, and commented positively on newly added buses, routes, and environmental elements. However, Stone described it as "bustled out of the door before it was good and ready", commenting that performance and stability issues made the game hard to recommend in its released state. Multiplayer.it's Simone Tagliaferri described the game as a successful simulation, complimenting its historical accuracy and regarding it as exploring an interesting time period around the fall of the Berlin Wall, but also as extremely demanding on systems and plagued by crashes, concluding that it was a unique simulator but one that was difficult to recommend.

== Legacy and successors ==
Despite the game being originally marketed as a German bus simulator; it has gained a significant international following from various bus communities with the most prominent being from the United Kingdom, Hong Kong and Central Europe.

Within parts of the English-speaking community the game is often informally pronounced as: "Om-see" as opposed to spelling out the games name: "O-M-S-I". This pronunciation has been often accredited to the popularity of NerdCubed's videos where he refers to the game as "Om-see" whereas many other YouTubers at the time didn't use this name.

As there is no official pronunciation, the term "Om-see" has become the de-facto name within multiple communities.

=== openOMSI ===
openOMSI is an open-source complete recreation of OMSI 2; aiming to port the game over to 64-bit by reverse engineering the original game's code and using artificial intelligence to write it using the programming language Rust.

Screenshot from openOMSI featuring the new UI and improved shaders

It brought many bug fixes and technical enhancements to the game, like making it possible to run OMSI 2 on multiple platforms including Mac, Linux, and Android. Support for DirectX 12 and OpenGL were also implemented which allowed for more realistic graphic presets to be used.

Many new features were added that were previously not possible in the former game such as: users being able to walk around maps on foot as well as multiplayer functionality.

Despite the port being written in a new coding language, users are required to have the original OMSI 2 installed.

Someone claiming to be a member of Aerosoft's marketing team, who appeared legitimate, did want to work with openOMSI, but for unknown reasons this didn't progress.

=== neoOMSI ===
Like openOMSI, neoOMSI is a recreation of OMSI 2, again built in Rust. neoOMSI originally came to be after developers working on openOMSI split away to form their own project after disagreements about the style and direction of the project (mainly AI usage).

neoOMSI liveried bus, inside neoOMSI

Unlike openOMSI, neoOMSI dropped support for mobile editions, but kept Mac and Linux support. OpenGL was also removed in favour of DX12 and Vulkan. It kept similar features to openOMSI but moved in a more OMSI 2 parity style of direction, favouring original OMSI 2 features and styles compared to adding totally new features.

Both projects are supported by other DLCs and addons such as BCS.

== DLC (downloadable content) ==
As the two owners, Marcel Kuhnt and Rüdiger Hülsmann, no longer work on OMSI, developers publish buses and maps through Aerosoft which then becomes DLC on Steam. DLC can vary from buses, to maps, or even utility and tools.

List of all DLC ever released on Steam as of November 2026
DLC name	Release date	Type of DLC	Developers
OMSI 2 Add-on AI-Articulated Bus for Vienna	21 July 2014	AI Bus	ViewApp, MR-Software GbR
OMSI 2 Add-on City Bus O305	13 August 2014	Bus, Map	MR-Software GbR, Rolf Westphalen
OMSI 2 Add-on Hamburg	11 September 2014	Map	Darius Bode, Barbara Bode
OMSI 2 Add-on Vienna	15 October 2014	Map	ViewApp
OMSI 2 Add-on Three Generations	3 December 2014	Bus	Darius Bode
OMSI 2 Add-on Chicago Downtown	17 June 2015	Map	Darius Bode
OMSI 2 Add-on Berlin X10	9 October 2015	Map	Halycon Media
OMSI 2 Add-on Vienna 1 - Line 24A	12 November 2015	Map	ViewApp
OMSI 2 Add-on Vienna 2 - Line 23A	12 November 2015	Map	ViewApp
OMSI 2 Add-On Projekt Gladbeck	10 December 2015	Map	Kevin Nitschmann, Darius Bode
OMSI 2 Add-on Downloadpack Vol. 1 - AI Vehicles	19 January 2016	AI vehicles	Halycon Media
OMSI 2 Add-On Citybus O305G	8 March 2016	Bus	Rolf Westphalen
OMSI 2 Add-On Citybus O405/O405G	8 March 2016	Bus	Pedro Vendeira
OMSI 2 Add-on Strassenbahn NF6D Essen/Gelsenkirchen	28 July 2016	Map	Kevin Nitschmann, Philip Zunk
OMSI 2 Add-On MAN Citybus Series	29 September 2016	Bus	Christian Rolle
OMSI 2 Add-On Aachen	13 October 2016	Map	Tobias Müller, Florian Wolf, Cedric Appel, Benedikt Steffens
OMSI 2 Add-on Rheinhausen	27 October 2016	Map	Halycon Media
OMSI 2 Add-On Doppelgelenkbus AGG 300	1 December 2016	Bus	Darius Bode
OMSI 2 Add-On Mallorca	15 December 2016	Map	Kevin Nitschmann, Darius Bode
OMSI 2 Add-On Citybus i280 Series	11 May 2017	Bus	BusTrainz
OMSI 2 Add-on Busbetrieb-Simulator	22 June 2017	Other	PeDePe GbR
OMSI 2 Add-on Downloadpack Vol. 2 - AI Vehicles	29 June 2017	AI vehicles	Halycon Media
OMSI 2 Add-on Downloadpack Vol. 3 - AI People	10 August 2017	AI people	Halycon Media
OMSI 2 Add-on VanHool Generationen Reihe	17 August 2017	Bus	Nicolas Clarysse
OMSI 2 Add-on Express 91.06	14 September 2017	Map	Creations AgoraS-114
OMSI 2 Add-on K-Bergbahn	22 September 2017	Map	Kevin Nitschmann
OMSI 2 Add-On HafenCity - Hamburg modern	19 October 2017	Map	Darius Bode
OMSI 2 Add-On Metropole Ruhr	2 November 2017	Map	Kevin Nitschmann, Christian Rolle
OMSI 2 Add-on Downloadpack Vol. 5 - AI People	27 November 2017	AI people	Halycon Media
OMSI 2 Add-on Bremen-Nord	30 November 2017	Map	Halycon Media
OMSI 2 Add-On Luzern - Linie 24	6 December 2017	Map	Simgames.ch
OMSI 2 Add-on Hamburger Buspaket	15 March 2018	Bus	Darius Bode
OMSI 2 Add-On Wuppertal	6 December 2018	Map	Kevin Nitschmann, Darius Bode
OMSI 2 Add-On Coachbus 250 [Remake]	10 December 2018	Bus	Long Vehicle's Team
OMSI 2 Add-On Urbino Stadtbusfamilie	7 February 2019	Bus	Christian Rolle
OMSI 2 Add-on Downloadpack Vol. 4 - AI Vehicles	4 March 2019	AI vehicles	Halycon Media
OMSI 2 Add-on Downloadpack Vol. 6 - AI People	3 April 2019	AI people	Halycon Media
OMSI 2 Add-on München City - Demo	18 April 2019	Map	Olgu Cerit
OMSI 2 Add-on Citybus i260 Series	9 May 2019	Bus	BusTrainz
OMSI 2 Add-On Wuppertal Buslinie 639	28 June 2019	Map	Kevin Nitschmann
OMSI 2 Add-On Masterbus Gen 3 Pack	13 August 2019	Bus	Masterswitch Studios
OMSI 2 Add-On München City	5 September 2019	Map	Olgu Cerit
OMSI 2 Add-On Studio Polygon Lite Pack	12 September 2019	Bus	Studio Polygon
OMSI 2 Add-On Köln	7 November 2019	Map	PAD-Labs GmbH
OMSI 2 Add-on Downloadpack Vol. 8 - AI People	20 November 2019	AI people	Halycon Media
OMSI 2 Add-On MAN DN95	27 November 2019	Bus	Halycon Media
OMSI 2 Add-On Regiobus i200	19 December 2019	Bus	BusTrainz
OMSI 2 Add-on Downloadpack Vol. 9 - AI Luxury Cars	4 February 2020	AI vehicles	Halycon Media
OMSI 2 Add-on Downloadpack Vol. 7 - AI Coaches	3 March 2020	AI vehicles	Halycon Media
OMSI 2 Add-On Digibus Phantom	2 April 2020	Bus	V3D
OMSI 2 Add-On Düsseldorf	7 April 2020	Map	Kevin Nitschmann, Christian Rolle
OMSI 2 Add-On Studio Polygon 400 MMC Pack	30 April 2020	Bus	Studio Polygon
OMSI 2 Add-on Bad Hügelsdorf 2020	21 May 2020	Map	Motion Games
OMSI 2 Add-On E-Bus Hamburg	4 June 2020	Bus	Darius Bode
OMSI 2 Add-on Düsseldorf M2	4 August 2020	Map	Kevin Nitschmann
OMSI 2 Add-on Coachbus 256	20 August 2020	Bus	Long Vehicle's Team
OMSI 2 Add-On Berlin BRT	24 August 2020	Map	Halycon Media
OMSI 2 Add-on Citybus 628c & 628g LF	1 December 2020	Bus	Kajosoft
OMSI 2 Add-on Leitstellen-Simulator	3 December 2020	Map	PeDePe GbR
OMSI 2 Add-on OmniNavigation	3 December 2020	Utility	PeDePe GbR
OMSI 2 Add-on Irisbus Intercity Pack	4 December 2020	Bus	Kescrole AddOns
OMSI 2 Add-On London	10 December 2020	Map	Rhys McCollin
OMSI 2 Add-on Heuliez Bus-Pack Access Bus GX327	14 December 2020	Bus	Acrotere Design
OMSI 2 Add-on Saint-Servan	21 December 2020	Map	Palme d’Or
OMSI 2 Add-on Grand Paris-Moulon	27 January 2021	Map	Créations AgoraS-114
OMSI 2 Add-on Düsseldorf - Linie 721	28 January 2021	Map	Kevin Nitschmann
OMSI 2 Add-on MAN Stadtbus New Lion's City	30 March 2021	Bus	mainMesh3D
OMSI 2 Add-On Heuliez Bus-Pack Generation X17	18 May 2021	Bus	Acrotere Design
OMSI 2 Add-On Velbert	10 June 2021	Map	Kevin Nitschmann
OMSI 2 Add-on Enhanced Environment Pack	17 June 2021	Enhancement	Илья Кузьбожев (Ilya Kuzbozhev)
OMSI 2 Add-on IVECO Bus Family Interurban Generation	22 June 2021	Bus	Kescrole AddOns
OMSI 2 Add-on Downloadpack Vol. 10 - AI Coaches	16 July 2021	AI vehicles	Halycon Media
OMSI 2 Add-on Downloadpack Vol. 11 - AI Electric Cars	16 August 2021	AI vehicles	Halycon Media
OMSI 2 Add-On Coachbus 250Next	23 September 2021	Bus	Long Vehicle's Team
OMSI 2 Add-on Irisbus Family Low Entry Bus	25 October 2021	Bus	Kescrole AddOns
OMSI 2 Add-on Yorkshire Counties	4 November 2021	Map	Kyle Johnson
OMSI 2 Add-On Citybus M301	18 November 2021	Bus	Sergey Panyukov
OMSI 2 Add-On Beijing	18 November 2021	Map	Chen Jiahuan
OMSI 2 Add-on Irisbus Family Citybus Pack	21 December 2021	Bus	Halycon Media
OMSI 2 Add-on Hamburg Linie 20	24 March 2022	Map	Darius Bode
OMSI 2 Add-on S41x Family	31 March 2022	Bus	Pedro Vendeira
OMSI 2 Add-on IVECO BUS Family Low Entry Buses	19 April 2022	Bus	Kescrole AddOns
OMSI 2 Add-on Masterbus Veiling Pack	12 May 2022	Bus	Masterswitch Studios
OMSI 2 Add-on Citybus S31X	12 August 2022	Bus	SADOP
OMSI 2 Add-on Downloadpack Vol. 12 - AI People - Asia Edition	18 August 2022	AI people	Halycon Media
OMSI 2 Tools - AUXI Expansion	14 September 2022	Utility	Paulwise Ltd
OMSI 2 Add-on Digibus Mirage	8 December 2022	Bus	V3D
OMSI 2 Add-on Coach O560 Series	13 December 2022	Bus	notio 3D
OMSI 2 Add-on IVECO Bus-Familie Überland Evadys	6 February 2023	Bus	Kescrole AddOns
OMSI 2 Add-on Heuliez Bus Pack GX x37 Diesel Edition	13 February 2023	Bus	Acrotere Design
OMSI 2 Add-on IVECO Bus Family Urbanway	20 February 2023	Bus	Nerosy
OMSI 2 Add-on Coachbus 303-Series	15 June 2023	Bus	Long Vehicle's Team
OMSI 2 Tools - Power Toolkit	21 June 2023	Utility	D4LH5D Software
OMSI 2 Add-on C2 Family Vol. 1 City Buses	27 June 2023	Bus	European OMSI Developer Team
OMSI 2 Add-On MAN SL200	29 June 2023	Bus	Sergey Panyukov
OMSI 2 Add-on Irisbus Family Interurban Evadys	25 July 2023	Bus	Kescrole AddOns
OMSI 2 Add-on Agora Bus Family Citybus Vol. 1	11 September 2023	Bus	Nerosy
OMSI 2 Add-on Hohenkirchen	20 September 2023	Map	CETO Design
OMSI 2 Add-on MAN Interurban Lion's Intercity LE	17 October 2023	Bus	Nick Zimmermann
OMSI 2 Add-on Agora Bus Family Citybus Vol. 2	30 October 2023	Bus	Nerosy
OMSI 2 Add-On S41X LE Business Series	23 November 2023	Bus	notio 3D
OMSI 2 Add-on Heuliez Bus Pack GX x37 Electric Edition	13 December 2023	Bus	Acrotere Design
OMSI 2 Add-on MAN Standardbus II	11 January 2024	Bus	Christian Rolle
OMSI 2 Add-on Citybus o530	18 January 2024	Bus	Kajosoft
OMSI 2 Add-on Berlin Line 300	14 February 2024	Map	Halycon Media
OMSI 2 Add-on Downloadpack Vol. 13 - AI Cars	20 March 2024	AI vehicles	Halycon Media
OMSI 2 Add-on Zurich Tram Line 11	29 April 2024	Map	Simgames.ch
OMSI 2 Add-on LIKINO-677	30 July 2024	Map	Moskur, DW Modplace
OMSI 2 Add-on IVECO Bus Family Urbanway Natural Power	10 September 2024	Bus	Nerosy
OMSI 2 Add-on City & Regionbus 200 Series	12 November 2024	Bus	Long Vehicle's Team
OMSI 2 Add-on Downloadpack Vol. 14 - AI Trucks	25 November 2024	AI vehicles	Halycon Media
OMSI 2 Add-On S400NF City Bus Series	29 November 2024	Bus	notio 3D
OMSI 2 Add-On Lancsbus Omnidecker	6 March 2025	Bus	Masterswitch Studios
OMSI 2 Add-on IVECO Bus Family Crealis Natural Power	18 March 2025	Bus	Nerosy
OMSI 2 Add-on Valiant Citybus Family	22 May 2025	Bus	ADIC group
OMSI 2 Add-on Downloadpack Vol. 15 - AI Vehicles	2 July 2025	AI vehicles	Halycon Media
OMSI 2 Add-On Thüringer Wald	29 July 2025	Map	SimART-Studio
OMSI 2 Add-on Citybus O530 Facelift	5 August 2025	Bus	Kajosoft
OMSI 2 Add-on Valiant Citybus Family Facelift	15 December 2025	Bus	ADIC Group
OMSI 2 Add-on Project Numazu	30 March 2026	Map	Aurora Studio, Negi-Kyu Vehicle Studio
OMSI 2 Add-on Berlin Linie 186	25 June 2026	Map	Halycon Media
OMSI 2 Add-on Valiant Citybus 7700 Hybrid	2 July 2026	Bus	ADIC Group
OMSI 2 Add-on O560 III Series	19 October 2026	Bus	notio 3D
OMSI 2 Add-on S500 LE Series	16 November 2026	Bus	notio 3D
