= Iron Front: Liberation 1944 =

2012 video game

- Cover art for Iron Front: Liberation 1944
- Developers: X1 Software, AWAR
- Publisher: Deep Silver
- Engine: Real Virtuality 3
- Platform: Microsoft Windows
- Release: May 25, 2012
- Genre: Tactical shooter
- Modes: Single-player, multiplayer

Iron Front: Liberation 1944 is a tactical shooter video game set in World War II Eastern Front. It features both German and Soviet single-player campaigns. The game was developed by X1 Software and AWAR on Bohemia Interactive's Real Virtuality engine. It was released May 25, 2012 for Microsoft Windows.

== Gameplay ==
Iron Front: Liberation 1944 is set in Southern Poland during Soviet summer offensive. The single player campaign can be played from either German or Soviet perspective. The Soviet campaign focuses on breaking through enemy's defenses. On the German side, the mission is to slow down the advance of the Soviet army. Campaigns start with infantry action but later on the player gets to control tanks and planes. These include for example Panzerkampfwagen IV, Königstiger, IS-2, Focke-Wulf Fw 190, Stuka and Petlyakov PE-2.

The multiplayer side includes both co-operative missions and player vs. player missions such as Capture the Flag, Deathmatch, Attack and Defense and Blitzkrieg.

The game also includes a comprehensive and extensive mission editor, enabling players to create their own missions and share them online. Modding possibilities in Iron Front: Liberation 1944 are more restricted compared to its parent game ARMA 2. Addons and mods must be released with consent of developers as a free or paid DLC.

== Reception ==
Reception

Aggregate score
Aggregator	Score
Metacritic	55/100

Review scores
Publication	Score
Destructoid	7/10
GameSpot	2/10
PC Gamer (US)	64/100
4Players	54/100
GameStar	67/100

Iron Front: Liberation 1944 received mixed reviews from critics upon release. On Metacritic, the game holds a score of 55/100 based on 20 reviews, indicating "mixed or average reviews".
