= Barrow Hill: Curse of the Ancient Circle =

2006 video game

- Developer: Shadow Tor Studios
- Publishers: WW: Shadow Tor Studios; NA: Got Game Entertainment; UK: Lighthouse Interactive
- Platform: Windows
- Release: WW: April 24, 2006 (Shadow Tor); NA: September 1, 2006; UK: October 6, 2006
- Genre: Adventure
- Mode: Single-player

Barrow Hill: Curse of the Ancient Circle is a horror adventure game developed by Shadow Tor Studios. Released in 2006, it is set in the site of Barrow Hill, based on real geographical locations in Cornwall, England.

A sequel, Barrow Hill: The Dark Path, was released in 2016.

== Plot ==
Forced to spend a sinister night there, the player will investigate what is happening to the local people and why an archeological dig, led by professor Conrad Morse, has created so much unrest and hostility among the local community. During the exploration of the local legends and superstitions, the mystery will be unfold while using modern electronic devices like PDAs, GPS and metal detectors to unfold the mystery.

== Gameplay ==
It is played as a classic first person "point and click" adventure, with the world being represented by pre-rendered, animated screens. The adventure is based on a non linear structure, that gives the players a lot of freedom in exploring the environment and collecting clues at their own pace.

== Reception ==
Reception

Aggregate score
Aggregator	Score
Metacritic	65/100

Review scores
Publication	Score
4Players	73%
Adventure Gamers	4/5
Computer Games Magazine	2.5/5
Eurogamer	5/10
GameSpot	2.6/10
GameZone	7.6/10
IGN	8.1/10
PC Gamer (US)	62%
PC Zone	62%
VideoGamer.com	6/10
The New York Times	(positive)

The game received "mixed or average reviews" according to the review aggregation website Metacritic. Some of the reviewers praised the creepy atmosphere, the quality of both audiovisual aspects and the logical game structure. The game puzzles were considered to be very well integrated with the story and the environment, never seeming like artificial obstacles to the player. Eurogamer said that the storyline "fizzles disappointingly as the game comes to its rather abrupt end." GameSpot criticized the lack of engagement and scare factor, comparing the game to "a wait in a doctor's office."

== Sequel ==
A sequel, Barrow Hill: The Dark Path, developed by Shadow Tor Studios was released on September 22, 2016 for Windows. It received a score of 5.5 out of 10 from CGMagazine and a score of 3.5 out of 5 from Adventure Gamers.
