= Wings over Vietnam =

2004 video combat game

- Developer: Third Wire
- Publishers: Destineer; Bold Games
- Designer: Tsuyoshi Kawahito
- Platform: Windows
- Release: NA: November 8, 2004; PAL: October 14, 2005
- Genre: Combat flight simulator
- Modes: Single-player, multiplayer

Wings over Vietnam is a PC combat flight simulation game set during the Vietnam War over South East Asia and covers the time period between 1964 and 1973.

The game includes a wide variety of jets and weapons which can be employed in various mission types such as MIG-CAP (MiG combat air patrol), strike, air support, Iron Hand, and reconnaissance. The game is based on the Strike Fighters: Project 1 engine and was developed by Third Wire Productions.

In 2009, a vastly enhanced and rewritten version for the Vista platform called Strike Fighters 2: Vietnam was released.

== Background ==
Wings over Vietnam was released in 2004 and was the third in a series of "Lite" Flight Simulators. The term "Lite" was applied because they are designed to be relatively easy to learn and play compared to other more hardcore types of flight simulator. There is a television series of the same name.

== Gameplay ==
Despite the "Lite" tag, a fair amount of realism has been built in; 1960s-style bombsights are simulated rather than modern computer-aided aiming reticles. Dive bombing and level bombing techniques have to be worked out by the game player if they are to have success at completing missions.

US Air to Air missiles in the game consist of early versions of the AIM-9 Sidewinder, AIM-7 Sparrow, and AIM-4 Falcon which are simulated to be as unreliable as the real missiles were. Regardless of having a "good lock on the target" there is a good chance the missile will miss. Just like the real accounts from the war suggest most of the dogfights are close in affairs with the nimble MiGs against the heavier less nimble US Aircraft.

The map of Vietnam has been scaled down slightly so that there is less time spent flying to a target, and also because air-to-air refuelling is not included in the game.

During a mission the players will fly in a flight of aircraft in which the computer-controlled planes keep in formation as they fly to a target. This flight can be issued commands; attack other aircraft or ground targets, fly home if they are damaged, or jettison their drop tanks. As they fly many other computer-controlled aircraft will be up in the air and can be viewed as they engage in dogfights or bomb targets.

True to the Vietnam theatre the player's aircraft will be met with a high level of radar guided Surface to Air Missiles (SAMS), and a variety of lethal Anti-Aircraft Artillery (AAA). The main SAM is the soviet SA-2, of which early and later versions are included in the game increasing lethality accordingly.

The player can select a campaign from either Operation Rolling Thunder (1965 to 1968), Linebacker I (1972) or Linebacker II (1972) which are similar in name and aircraft involved to the actual campaigns from the conflict.

Single Missions are also available, which can be customised to allow the player to practice with specific aircraft and weapons.
