= TrackIR =

Optical motion tracking game controller

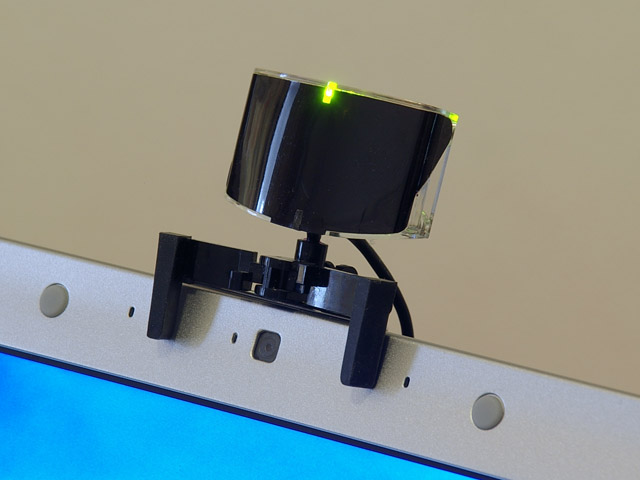
- TrackIR 4:PRO camera attached to laptop monitor
- Manufacturer: NaturalPoint Inc.
- Type: Video game controller
- Released: 2001
- Connectivity: USB
- Website: www.trackir.com

TrackIR, created by NaturalPoint Inc., is an optical motion tracking controller for Microsoft Windows.

It tracks head motions with up to six degrees of freedom (6DOF) which allows for handsfree view control. Head position and orientation are measured by a purpose-built video camera, mounted on top of the user's monitor, that observes infrared (IR) light reflected or emitted by markers on a rigid model worn by the user.

The camera and tracking sensitivity adjustments are controlled by TrackIR, head movements can be scaled while the user is still looking at the monitor allowing a virtual movement of 180 degrees to occur.

== History ==
TrackIR was initially designed as an assistive technology device for the Windows cursor control.

Between 2002 and the year 2005, five TrackIR camera models were released, bringing more features such as doubled frame rate and increased resolution.

== TrackIR interface with games ==
The proprietary TrackIR interface has become commonplace for view control in PC games and simulations and is only intended for use with TrackIR products.

As more developers and games added support for the TrackIR, developers were successful in reverse engineering the proprietary interface allowing non-TrackIR devices to be used for view control, including generic webcams. This issue was resolved in October 2008, when the interface began encrypting the data stream sent to some new titles, rendering non-supported devices incompatible with these new game titles. However, due to the fact that older TrackIR-1 and TrackIR-2 products use software drivers which are no longer maintained, they are also incompatible with titles using the newer interface.

== Criticisms ==
=== TrackIR 4 Pro ===
Some reviewers found the TrackIR 4 Pro with a TrackClip PRO bundle to be expensive at the $200–220 prices, while still considering it a worthwhile purchase for a serious simulation users. of June, 2009 the bundle is now available for $120. Additionally, one review noted that the TrackIR 4 Pro runs at a temperature which they consider more higher than normal when it is actively tracking.

=== TrackClip PRO ===
Some reviewers found the TrackClip PRO to be brittle, and one critic was disappointed that it was unable to be positioned on the right side of the head while still recommending the TrackClip PRO product.

== See also ==
- FreeTrack, is an open-source and free head-tracking software which users can build their tracking hardware with webcams and infrared LEDs cheaply. FreeTrack is no longer maintained.
- FaceTrackNoIR, is an open-source and free head-tracking software which only requires a webcam and no infrared LEDs.
- OpenTrack, is an active open-source project combining many features of the products FreeTrack and FaceTrackNoIR. It Input sources and includes facial recognition, IR point tracking, paper marker tracking, and more.
