= Wings of War (video game) =

2004 video game

- Developer: Silver Wish Games
- Publisher: Gathering
- Platforms: Microsoft Windows, Xbox
- Release: EU: July 30, 2004; NA: August 30, 2004
- Genre: Combat flight simulator
- Modes: Single-player, multiplayer

Wings of War is a World War I combat flight simulator developed by Czech studio Silver Wish Games and published by Gathering for Microsoft Windows and Xbox in 2004. The game was a standard wartime flight simulator with the underused setting of World War I. Players assume the role of a Royal Air Force pilot fighting the Luftstreitkräfte in several missions.

== Gameplay ==
After players created a profile, the game offered numerous options and game play modes including Campaign and Instant Action. During the Campaign mode, players could not only pilot single fighter planes but could also jump into bombers and recon planes as well as inside the seat of tail-mounted machine guns during missions. Players could also fight with rival pilots, partake in bonus missions and collect bonus icons to increase their score although some missions were timed.

== Reception ==
Reception

Aggregate score
| Aggregator | Score | |
| Aggregator | PC | Xbox |
|---|---|---|
| Metacritic | 69/100 | 62/100 |

Review scores
| Publication | Score | |
| Publication | PC | Xbox |
|---|---|---|
| 1Up.com | N/A | C+ |
| Computer Games Magazine | 3.5/5 | N/A |
| Game Informer | N/A | 6.5/10 |
| GameSpot | 7.5/10 | 7.4/10 |
| GameZone | N/A | 6.8/10 |
| IGN | 6.6/10 | 6.6/10 |
| Official Xbox Magazine (US) | N/A | 6.1/10 |
| PC Gamer (US) | 76% | N/A |
| TeamXbox | N/A | 6.5/10 |
| X-Play | N/A | 2/5 |
| The Sydney Morning Herald | N/A | 2.5/5 |

The game received "mixed or average reviews" on both platforms according to the review aggregation website Metacritic.
