= Combat Flight Simulator 3 =

2002 video game

Combat Flight Simulator 3: Battle for Europe
- Developer: Microsoft Game Studios
- Publisher: Microsoft Game Studios
- Producers: Tucker Hatfield; Mike Ammerlaan
- Designers: Rob Brown; Leon Rosenshein
- Artist: Rick Welsh
- Series: Microsoft Flight Simulator
- Platform: Microsoft Windows
- Release: NA: October 24, 2002; EU: November 15, 2002
- Genre: Combat flight simulator
- Modes: Single-player, Multiplayer

A B-29 flying over Nazi Germany

Combat Flight Simulator 3: Battle for Europe (CFS3), is the latest installment of combat flight simulators from Microsoft Game Studios, released on October 24, 2002, in North America and on November 15, 2002, in Europe for the Microsoft Windows.

== Gameplay ==
The game is more or less a heavily updated version of the first (Microsoft Combat Flight Simulator), offering a far wider range of options to the player. The game incorporates an active campaign mode, whereby the player may play for the USAAF, RAF or Luftwaffe in a campaign starting in March 1943. Based on the player's performance in North-west Europe, which spans from northernmost England to eastern Berlin, the player can alter the length and even outcome of the war. By avoiding the aviational errors of the Luftwaffe made in the past, and by targeting key targets in British production centres, it is even possible for the Germans to drive the Allies back to London and force their surrender. It is also possible for the Allies to make a landing in Fortress Europe prior to the 6/6/44, or D-day. The multiplayer game allows players to occupy different stations on the same vehicle. The multiplayer supports either Internet or local area network play.

== Reception ==
Combat Flight Simulator 3 received a "Silver" sales award from the Entertainment and Leisure Software Publishers Association (ELSPA), indicating sales of at least 100,000 copies in the United Kingdom.

Combat Flight Simulator 3 was a nominee for The Electric Playground's 2002 "Best Simulation for PC" award, but lost to MechWarrior 4: Mercenaries. It also received a nomination for "Computer Simulation Game of the Year" at the AIAS' 6th Annual Interactive Achievement Awards., which was ultimately given to The Sims: Unleashed.

Combat Flight Simulator 3 garnered mixed reviews, and holds an average of 69/100 on aggregate web site Metacritic.

== Add-on ==
Firepower is an expansion pack released in 2004, developed by Shockwave Productions and published by GMX Media and Tri Synergy. Firepower adds 18 new aircraft bringing the total of 36 military aircraft (or 56 with variants) to Combat Flight Simulator 3. Firepower also adds 50 new historical type missions, new ordnance and improved graphic effects.

The aircraft in Firepower include the B-17 Flying Fortress models F and G, B-29A Superfortress, Arado 234B Blitz, Dewoitine D.520 fighter, Dornier 217M medium bomber, Dornier 217N night fighter, He-162A Salamander, Me 334, Me410A Schnellbomber, Me410B-2 R-3 zerstorer, Me410B-2 U-2 R-4 zerstorer, Me410B-2 U-4 zerstorer, P-40N Warhawk, Ta-154 Moskito, Ta-152C1 R31, Ta-152H-1, Ta-183 Huckebein (Raven) Interceptor, Avro Lancaster Mk III heavy bomber, Ho-229 V5 Supersonic Fighter /bomber, Avro Lancaster GS heavy bomber, and a B-24J Liberator. Also there are 4 (or 5 with a free patch) new bombers in which the player can man different aircrew positions.

Player can use the bombsight to drop newly added ordnance onto a target like the Little Boy, Fat Man, German radiological dirty bombs or the Tallboy bomb. However some of these aircraft are hypothetical especially the German designs some of which never saw aerial combat during World War II. So is the German ordnance hypothetical as well. Another feature in this add on is that you can fly bombers in a formation, with FLAK effects when under enemy anti aircraft fire. Twenty-five missions of the Memphis Belle B-17 Flying Fortress are included in this add on.

Firepower garnered generally positive reviews, and holds an average of 88/100 on aggregate web site Metacritic.

== See also ==
- IL-2 Sturmovik
- Jane's Attack Squadron
