= Strike Fighters: Project 1 =

2002 video game

- Developer: Third Wire Productions
- Publisher: Strategy First
- Designer: Tsuyoshi Kawahito
- Engine: Strike Fighters
- Platform: Windows
- Release: NA: October 24, 2002; EU: January 2003
- Genre: Air combat simulation
- Modes: Single-player, multiplayer

Strike Fighters: Project 1 is a 2002 combat flight simulation video game that primarily centers on a fictitious conflict in the Middle East between the Kingdom of Dhimar and the Empire of Paran, two sides of a proxy war between the United States and the Soviet Union, between the late 1950s and the early 1970s. Although the countries and conflict may not be real, the aircraft and weapons used are completely accurate.

In 2004, Strike Fighters Gold was released to European market.

In 2008, Strike Fighters 2, updated to run on Windows Vista, was released.

The game was developed independently by Third Wire Productions.

== Background ==
Strike Fighters Project 1 was released in 2002. The initial reviews were of a poor unfinished game that had some exceptional 3D models of aircraft. In fact an early unfinished release of the game was sold by the leading US chain store.

== Story ==
The storyline of Strike Fighters is set during a fictional conflict between the Kingdom of Dhimar and the Empire of Paran. The story begins in 1919, when geologists discover oil in the Valley of Kerman, a place at the Dhimari-Parani border. When drilling operations begin in the oil fields, Shah Mushani of Paran sends his troops across the border, beginning a long conflict between the nations.

In September 1933, Shah Mushani decides to put a halt to the conflict, following numerous attempts to capture the Mazadran oil fields. While Dhimar becomes a wealthy and economically powerful country, Paran has become poor. In February 1957, Halani Khomar, a Soviet-backed revolutionary leader, stages a bloody coup against the Mushani regime. Once in power, Khomar begins building up the Parani military forces, buying the newest fighter aircraft and tanks from the Soviet Union.

King Husani Karmar al'Galbhi of Dhimar, fearing a new war, decides to approach the United States for military assistance. Tensions between the two countries culminate in two years of terrorist attacks in Dhimari border cities. In June 1959, the Dhimari ports become subject to a Parani naval blockade, stopping all shipping from and to Dhimar. Prince Fa'ad al'Galbhi, commander of the Dhimari Air Force, starts an emergency buildup of air power by creating several Special Operations Wings, crewed by foreign mercenary pilots willing to fight. In July, the US dispatches US Naval and Air Force squadrons to assist their ally.

In September 1959, a mass Parani offensive is launched towards the Valley of Kerman and the Mazadran oil fields, and the game picks up here.
