= Index of Windows games (S) =

This is an index of Microsoft Windows games.

This list has been split into multiple pages. Please use the Table of Contents to browse it.

Title	Released	Developer	Publisher
S.C.A.R.S.	1998	Vivid Image	Ubisoft
S.T.A.L.K.E.R. 2: Heart of Chornobyl	2024	GSC Game World	GSC Game World
S.T.A.L.K.E.R.: Call of Pripyat	2009	GSC Game World	GSC World Publishing, Deep Silver, BitComposer Games
S.T.A.L.K.E.R.: Clear Sky	2008	GSC Game World	GSC World Publishing, Deep Silver
S.T.A.L.K.E.R.: Shadow of Chernobyl	2007	GSC Game World	GSC World Publishing, THQ
S.W.I.N.E.	2001	StormRegion	Fishtank Interactive
S40 Racing	1997	Digital Illusions CE	Digital Illusions CE
Sabotain: Break the Rules	2004	Avalon Style Entertainment	Akella
The Saboteur	2009	Pandemic Studios	Electronic Arts
Sacrifice	2000	Shiny Entertainment	Interplay Entertainment
Saeko: Giantess Dating Sim	2024	Safe Havn	Hyper Real
Safecracker: The Ultimate Puzzle Adventure	2006	Kheops Studio	The Adventure Company
Saints Row 2	2008	Volition	THQ
Salammbo: Battle for Carthage	2003	Cryo Interactive	Cryo Interactive
Salt Lake 2002	2002	Attention to Detail	Eidos Interactive
Sam & Max Beyond Time and Space	2007	Telltale Games	Telltale Games
Sam & Max Hit the Road	2002	LucasArts	LucasArts
Sam & Max Save the World	2006	Telltale Games	The Adventure Company, JoWood Productions
Sammy Sosa High Heat Baseball 2001	2000	Team .366	The 3DO Company
Sammy Sosa Softball Slam	2000	The 3DO Company	The 3DO Company
Samurai Shodown II	1996	SNK	SNK
Samurai Warriors 2	2006	Koei, Omega Force	Koei
San Diego Zoo Presents: The Animals!	1992	Arnowitz Studios	The Software Toolworks
Sanctum	2011	Coffee Stain Studios	Coffee Stain Studios
Sanctum 2	2013	Coffee Stain Studios	Coffee Stain Studios
Sands of Salzaar	2021	Han-Squirrel Studio	XD
Sangokushi Kōmeiden	1996	Koei	Koei
Sanitarium	1998	DreamForge Intertainment	ASC Games, XS Games, LLC
Sanity: Aiken's Artifact	2000	Monolith Productions	Fox Interactive
SAS: Secure Tomorrow	2008	City Interactive	City Interactive
Satisfactory	2024	Coffee Stain Studios	Coffee Stain Publishing
Saturnalia	2022	Santa Ragione	Santa Ragione
Savage 2: A Tortured Soul	2008	S2 Games	S2 Games
Savage Skies	2002	iRock Interactive	BAM! Entertainment
Savage: The Battle for Newerth	2003	S2 Games	iGames, TriSynergy
Saw	2009	Zombie Studios	Konami
Saya no Uta	2003	Nitroplus	Nitroplus
Scan Command: Jurassic Park	2001	Knowledge Adventure	Knowledge Adventure
Scarface: The World Is Yours	2006	Radical Entertainment	Sierra Entertainment
Scarlet Weather Rhapsody	2008	Twilight Frontier, Team Shanghai Alice	Twilight Frontier, Team Shanghai Alice
Scars Above	2023	Mad Head Games	Prime Matter
Schizm: Mysterious Journey	2001	LK Avalon	LK Avalon, The Adventure Company
School Tycoon	2004	Cat Daddy Games	Global Star Software
Scivelation	2009	Black Wing Foundation	
Scooby-Doo! Mystery of the Fun Park Phantom	1999	Engineering Animation, Inc.	SouthPeak Games
Scorched 3D	2001	Gavin Camp	
Scorcher	1996	Zyrinx	Scavenger, Inc.
Scrapland	2004	Mercury Steam Entertainment	Enlight
Scratches	2006	Nucleosys	Got Game Entertainment
Screamer 4x4	2001	Clever's Development	Virgin Interactive
Screamer Rally	1997	Milestone srl	Virgin Interactive
Screencheat	2014	Samurai Punk	Surprise Attack
Sea Dogs	2000	Akella	Bethesda Softworks
Sea Life Safari	2007	WildTangent	Sierra On-Line
Season of the Sakura	2002	JAST	JAST, JAST USA
SeaWorld Adventure Parks Tycoon	2003	Deep Red Games	Activision
A Second Face	2008	Jospin Le Woltaire	
Second Sight	2004	Free Radical Design	Codemasters
Secret Agent Barbie	2001	Gigawatt Studios	Vivendi Universal Interactive Publishing
Secret Files 2: Puritas Cordis	2009	Fusionsphere Systems	Deep Silver
Secret Files: Tunguska	2006	Fusionsphere Systems	Dreamcatcher Interactive, The Adventure Company, Deep Silver
Secret Maryo Chronicles	2003	SMC Development Team	
The Secret of the Nautilus	2001	Cryo Interactive	Cryo Interactive
Secret of the Solstice	2007	DNC Entertainment	DNC Entertainment, Outspark
Secret Service (2008 video game)	2008	Cauldron HQ	Activision Value
Secret Service (2001 video game)	2001	Fun Labs	Activision Value
Secret Service 2	2003	4D Rulers	Activision Value
Secret Weapons Over Normandy	2003	Totally Games	LucasArts
The Secrets of Atlantis: The Sacred Legacy	2006	The Adventure Company	Dreamcatcher Interactive
Section 8	2009	TimeGate Studios	SouthPeak Games
Section 8: Prejudice	2011	TimeGate Studios	TimeGate Studios, Atari
Sega Bass Fishing	2001	Sega	Sega
Sega Genesis Classics	2010	Sega	Sega
Sega GT	2001	Wow Entertainment	Sega Corporation, Sega PC
Sega Marine Fishing	2001	Wow Entertainment, Inc.	Sega, Empire Interactive Europe Ltd.
Sega Rally 2	1998	AM5	Sega
Sega Rally Championship	1997	AM5	Sega
Sega Rally Revo	2007	SEGA Racing Studio	Sega
Sega Smash Pack	1999	Sega	Sega
Sega Touring Car Championship	1996	Sega-AM3	Sega
Sega Worldwide Soccer 97	1996	Sega	Sega
Sekiro: Shadows Die Twice	2019	FromSoftware	FromSoftware, Activision
Sengoku	2011	Paradox Development Studio	Paradox Interactive
Sentient	1997	Psygnosis	Psygnosis
Sentinel Returns	1998	Hookstone	Psygnosis
Senua's Saga: Hellblade II	2024	Ninja Theory	Xbox Game Studios
Serious Sam: The First Encounter	2001	Croteam	Gathering of Developers
Serious Sam: The Second Encounter	2002	Croteam	Gathering of Developers
Serious Sam: Siberian Mayhem	2022	Croteam, Timelock Studio	Devolver Digital
Serious Sam II	2005	Croteam	2K Games
Serious Sam 3: BFE	2011	Croteam	Devolver Digital
Serious Sam 4	2020	Croteam	Devolver Digital
The Serpent Rogue	2022	Sengi Games	Team17
Session: Skate Sim	2019	crea-ture Studios	crea-ture Studios
The Settlers II	2006	Blue Byte	Ubisoft
The Settlers III	1998	Blue Byte	Focus Multimedia Ltd.
The Settlers III: Quest of the Amazons	1999	Blue Byte	Blue Byte
The Settlers IV	2001	Blue Byte	Blue Byte
The Settlers: Heritage of Kings	2004	Blue Byte	Ubisoft
The Settlers: Rise of an Empire	2007	Blue Byte	Ubisoft
Settlers 7: Paths to a Kingdom	2010	Blue Byte	Ubisoft
Seven Kingdoms II: The Fryhtan Wars	1999	Enlight	Ubisoft
Severance: Blade of Darkness	2001	Rebel Act Studios	Codemasters
Shadow Gambit: The Cursed Crew	2023	Mimimi Games	Mimimi Games, Hooded Horse
Shadow Man	1999	Acclaim Studios Teesside	Acclaim Entertainment
Shadow Master	1997	HammerHead	Psygnosis
Shadow of Memories	2001	Konami	Konami
Shadow of the Tomb Raider	2018	Eidos-Montréal	Square Enix Europe
Shadow Ops: Red Mercury	2004	Zombie Studios	Atari
Shadow Tactics: Blades of the Shogun	2016	Mimimi Productions	Daedalic Entertainment
Shadow Warrior	2013	Flying Wild Hog	Devolver Digital
Shadow Warrior 2	2016	Flying Wild Hog	Devolver Digital
Shadow Warrior 3	2022	Flying Wild Hog	Devolver Digital
ShadowFlare	2001	Denyusha	Emurasoft
Shadowgate	2014	Zojoi, LLC	Reverb Triple XP
Shadowgrounds	2005	Frozenbyte	Plan 1, Meridian4
Shadowgrounds: Survivor	2007	Frozenbyte	Frozenbyte
Shadowrun	2007	FASA Interactive	Microsoft Game Studios
Shadowrun Returns	2013	Harebrained Schemes	Harebrained Schemes
Shadowrun: Dragonfall	2014	Harebrained Schemes	Harebrained Schemes
Shadowrun: Hong Kong	2015	Harebrained Schemes	Harebrained Schemes
Shadows of the Damned	2024	Grasshopper Manufacture	NetEase Entertainment Interactive
Shadows: Awakening	2018	Games Farm	Kalypso Media
Shadows: Heretic Kingdoms	2014	Games Farm	bitComposer Games
Shadwen	2016	Frozenbyte	Frozenbyte
Shakedown: Hawaii	2019	Vblank Entertainment	Vblank Entertainment
Shanghai II: Dragon's Eye	1994	Activision	Activision
Shank	2010	Klei Entertainment	Electronic Arts
Shannara	1995	Legend Entertainment	Legend Entertainment
Shantae: Risky's Revenge	2014	WayForward	WayForward
Shantae and the Pirate's Curse	2015	WayForward	WayForward
Shantae: Half-Genie Hero	2016	WayForward	WayForward
Shantae and the Seven Sirens	2019	WayForward	WayForward
Shantae Advance: Risky Revolution	2025	WayForward	WayForward
Shaq Fu: A Legend Reborn	2015	Big Deez Productions	Big Deez Productions
Shark Tale	2004	Edge of Reality	Activision
Shattered – Tale of the Forgotten King	2021	Redlock Studio	Redlock Studio
Shattered Horizon	2009	Futuremark Games Studio	Futuremark Games Studio
Shattered Union	2005	PopTop Software	2K Games
Shaun White Snowboarding	2008	Ubisoft Montreal	Ubisoft
Sheep	2000	Mind's Eye Productions	Empire Interactive
Sheep, Dog 'n' Wolf	2001	Infogrames	Infogrames
Shellshock 2: Blood Trails	2009	Rebellion Developments	Eidos Interactive
Shellshock: Nam '67	2004	Guerrilla Games	Eidos Interactive
Sherlock Holmes Chapter One	2021	Frogwares	Frogwares
Sherlock Holmes Versus Arsène Lupin	2007	Frogwares	Focus Home Interactive
Sherlock Holmes Versus Jack the Ripper	2009	Frogwares	Focus Home Interactive
Sherlock Holmes: The Awakened	2006	Frogwares	Focus Home Interactive
Sherlock Holmes: The Awakened	2023	Frogwares	Frogwares
Sherlock Holmes: The Case of the Silver Earring	2004	Frogwares	Ubisoft
Sherlock Holmes: Crimes & Punishments	2014	Frogwares	Frogwares
Sherlock Holmes: The Devil's Daughter	2016	Frogwares	Frogwares
Sherlock Holmes: The Mystery of the Mummy	2002	Frogwares	The Adventure Company
The Shield	2007	Point of View, Inc.	Aspyr Media
Shikkoku no Sharnoth: What a Beautiful Tomorrow	2008	Liar-soft	Liar-soft
Shining Resonance Refrain	2018	O-Two	Sega
Shizuku	1996	Leaf	
Ship Simulator	2006	VSTEP	Lighthouse Interactive
The Ship	2006	Outerlight	Valve, Mindscape Group, Merscom
Shivers	1995	Sierra On-Line	Sierra On-Line
Shivers II: Harvest of Souls	1997	Sierra On-Line	Sierra On-Line
Shockwave Assault	1995	Paradox Development	Electronic Arts
Shogo: Mobile Armor Division	1998	Monolith Productions	Monolith Productions
Shogun: Total War	2000	The Creative Assembly	Electronic Arts
Shoot the Bullet	2005	Team Shanghai Alice	Team Shanghai Alice
The Shore	2021	Ares Dragonis	Ares Dragonis
Shotest Shogi	2008	AI Factory, Rubicon Development	AI Factory, Rubicon Development
Shrek 2: Team Action	2004	Luxoflux, Amaze Entertainment	Activision
Shrek SuperSlam	2005	7 Studios	Activision, Shaba Games
Shrek the Third	2007	7 Studios, Shaba Games	Activision
Sid Meier's Alpha Centauri	1998	Firaxis Games	Electronic Arts
Sid Meier's Antietam!	1998	Firaxis Games	Electronic Arts
Sid Meier's Colonization	1995	Microprose	Microprose
Sid Meier's Gettysburg!	1997	Firaxis Games	Electronic Arts
Sid Meier's Pirates!	2004	Firaxis Games	Atari, 2K Games, Valve
Sid Meier's Railroads!	2006	Firaxis Games	2K Games
Sid Meier's SimGolf	2002	Maxis	Electronic Arts
Sid Meier's Starships	2015	Firaxis Games	2K
Siege of Centauri	2019	Stardock Entertainment	Stardock Entertainment
Sifu	2022	Sloclap	Sloclap, Kepler Interactive
The Signal from Tölva	2017	Big Robot	Big Robot
Silent Hill 2	2001	Konami	Konami
Silent Hill 3	2003	Konami	Konami
Silent Hill 4: The Room	2004	Konami	Konami
Silent Hill: Homecoming	2008	Konami Digital Entertainment, Double Helix Games	Konami Digital Entertainment
Silent Hunter II	2002	Ultimation Inc.	Focus Multimedia Ltd.
Silent Hunter III	2005	Ubisoft Bucharest	Ubisoft
Silent Hunter 4: Wolves of the Pacific	2007	Ubisoft Bucharest	Ubisoft
Silent Hunter 5: Battle of the Atlantic	2010	Ubisoft Bucharest	Ubisoft
Silent Storm	2003	Nival Interactive	JoWood Productions
Silt	2022	Spiral Circus	Mastertronic Group
Silver	1999	Infogrames	Infogrames
Silver Knights	2002	Haruo Teshima	
Silverfall	2006	Monte Cristo	Monte Cristo
SimCity	1991	Maxis	Maxis
SimCity 2000	1995	Maxis	Maxis, Electronic Arts
SimCity 3000	1999	Maxis	EA Games
SimCity 4	2003	Maxis	Electronic Arts
SimCity Societies	2007	Tilted Mill Entertainment	Electronic Arts
SimCopter	1996	Maxis	Electronic Arts
SimEarth	1990	Maxis	Maxis
SimFarm	1996	Maxis	Maxis, Mindscape
SimGolf	1996	Maxis	Maxis
SimIsle: Missions in the Rainforest	1996	Intelligent Games	Maxis
Simon the Sorcerer	2002	Adventure Soft	Adventure Soft
Simon the Sorcerer II: The Lion, the Wizard and the Wardrobe	1995	Adventure Soft	Adventure Soft
Simon the Sorcerer 3D	2002	Headfirst Productions	Adventure Soft
Simon the Sorcerer 4: Chaos Happens	2007	Silver Style Entertainment	RTL Enterprises, Playlogic Entertainment
SimPark	1996	Maxis	Maxis
SimPort	2007	Tygron, Port of Rotterdam, TU Delft	
The Simpsons Cartoon Studio	1996	Big Top Productions	Fox Interactive
The Simpsons: Hit & Run	2003	Radical Entertainment	Vivendi Universal Games
The Simpsons: Virtual Springfield	1997	Digital Evolution	Fox Interactive
The Sims	2000	Maxis	Electronic Arts
The Sims 2	2004	Maxis	Electronic Arts
The Sims 3	2009	Electronic Arts	Electronic Arts
SimSafari	1998	Electronic Arts, Maxis	Maxis
SimTower	1995	OPeNBooK Co., Ltd.	Maxis
SimTown	1995	Maxis	Maxis
SimTunes	1996	Maxis	Maxis
SiN	1998	Ritual Entertainment	Activision
Sin Episodes: Emergence	2006	Ritual Entertainment	Valve
Sin Mission Pack: Wages of Sin	1999	2015	Activision
Sinbad: Legend of the Seven Seas	2003	Small Rockets	Atari SA
Singles: Flirt Up Your Life	2003	Rotobee	Deep Silver
Singles 2: Triple Trouble	2005	Rotobee	Deep Silver
Singularity	2010	Raven Software	Activision
The Sinking City	2019	Frogwares	Frogwares
The Sinking City 2	2025	Frogwares	Frogwares
Sinking Island	2007	White Birds Productions	Microids/Encore Games
Sinner: Sacrifice for Redemption	2018	Dark Star	Another Indie
Sins of a Solar Empire	2008	Ironclad Games	Stardock
Six Days in Fallujah	2010	Atomic Games	Atomic Games
Skateboard Park Tycoon	2001	Cat Daddy Games	Activision
Ski Park Manager	2002	Lankhor	Microids
Ski Resort Extreme	2004	Cat Daddy Games	Global Star Software
Ski Resort Tycoon	2001	Cat Daddy Games	Activision Value
Ski Resort Tycoon II	2001	Cat Daddy Games	Activision Value
SkiFree	2005	Chris Pirih	Microsoft
Skull and Bones	2024	Ubisoft Singapore	Ubisoft
Skyborg: Into the Vortex	1995	Fringe Multimedia	SkyBox International
Slave Zero	1999	Accolade	Atari, Infogrames
Sleeping Dogs	2012	United Front Games	Square Enix
Slender: The Arrival	2013	Blue Isle Studios, Parsec Productions	Blue Isle Studios
Slipstream 5000	1995	The Software Refinery	Gremlin Interactive
Slipways	2021	Beetlewing	Beetlewing
Slitterhead	2024	Bokeh Game Studio	Bokeh Game Studio
Smokin' Guns	2009	Smokin' Guns Productions, Iron Claw Interactive	
Snake Pass	2017	Sumo Digital	Sumo Digital
Sniper Elite	2005	Rebellion Developments	Atari
Sniper Ghost Warrior 3	2017	CI Games	CI Games
Sniper Ghost Warrior Contracts	2019	CI Games	CI Games
Sniper Ghost Warrior Contracts 2	2021	CI Games	CI Games
Sniper: Ghost Warrior	2010	City Interactive	City Interactive
Sniper: Ghost Warrior 2	2013	City Interactive	City Interactive
Snood	1996	David M. Dobson	Snood World
Snoopy vs. the Red Baron	2006	Smart Bomb Interactive	Namco Bandai Games America
Snow Sakura	2003	D.O.	D.O.
SnowRunner	2020	Saber Interactive	Focus Home Interactive
Snufkin: Melody of Moominvalley	2024	Hyper Games	Raw Fury
So Blonde	2008	Wizarbox	Eidos Interactive
SODA Off-Road Racing	1997	Software Allies	Sierra Entertainment
Solar 2	2011	Jay Watts	Murudai
Solar Ash	2021	Heart Machine	Annapurna Interactive
Solar Crusade	1996	Infogrames	Infogrames
Solarix	2015	Pulsetense Games	KISS Ltd
Soldat	2002	Nick "EnEsCe" Cooper, Michal Marcinkowski	
Soldier of Fortune	2000	Raven Software	Activision
Soldier of Fortune II: Double Helix	2002	Raven Software	Activision
Soldier of Fortune: Payback	2007	Cauldron HQ	Activision Value
Soldiers at War	1998	Random Games	Strategic Simulations, Inc.
Soldiers: Heroes of World War II	2004	Best Way	Codemasters
Söldner-X: Himmelsstürmer	2007	SideQuest Studios	eastasiasoft
Söldner: Secret Wars	2004	Wings Simulations	JoWood Productions
Solium Infernum	2009	Cryptic Comet	Cryptic Comet
The Solus Project	2016	Teotl Studios, Grip Digital	Teotl Studios, Grip Digital
Soma	2015	Frictional Games	Frictional Games
Someday You'll Return	2020	CBE Software	Bohemia Interactive
Songs of Conquest	2024	Lavapotion	Coffee Stain Publishing
Sonic 3D Blast	1997	Traveller's Tales, Sega	Sega
Sonic Adventure 2	2012	Sonic Team	Sega
Sonic Dash	2014	Hardlight	Sega
Sonic Dreams Collection	2015	Arcane Kids	Arcane Kids
Sonic Forces	2017	Sonic Team	Sega
Sonic Generations	2011	Devil's Detail	Sega
Sonic Heroes	2003	Sega Studio USA	Sega
Sonic Lost World	2015	Sonic Team, Sega of Europe	Sega
Sonic Mania	2017	Headcannon, PagodaWest Games	Sega
Sonic Mega Collection	2002	Sonic Team, VR-1 Japan, Inc., Comolink Inc.	Sega
Sonic R	1997	Traveller's Tales	Sega
Sonic Riders	2006	Sonic Team	Sega
Sonic the Hedgehog	2010	Sonic Team	Sega
Sonic the Hedgehog 2	2011	Sonic Team	Sega
Sonic the Hedgehog 4: Episode I	2010	Dimps, Sonic Team	Sega
Sonic the Hedgehog 4: Episode II	2012	Dimps, Sonic Team	Sega
Sonic CD	1996	Sonic Team, Sega PC	Sega
Sons of the Forest	2024	Endnight Games	Newnight
Sorry!	1998	Hasbro Interactive	Third-I Productions
Soul Axiom	2016	Wales Interactive	Wales Interactive
Soul Link	2004	Navel	Navel
Soul of the Ultimate Nation	2007	Webzen	Webzen, The9, NHN, ijji
Soul Reaver 2	2001	Crystal Dynamics	Eidos Interactive
Soulbringer	2000	Infogrames	Interplay Entertainment
South Park	1998	Iguana Entertainment	Acclaim Entertainment
South Park: Chef's Luv Shack	1999	Acclaim Entertainment	Acclaim Entertainment
South Park Rally	1999	Tantalus Interactive	Acclaim Entertainment
Sovereign Syndicate	2024	Crimson Herring Studios	Crimson Herring Studios
Space Ace	2007	Digital Leisure Inc.	1C Company
The Space Bar	1997	Boffo Games	Rocket Science Games, SegaSoft
Space Bunnies Must Die!	1998	Jinx	Ripcord Games
Space Chimps	2008	Wicked Witch Software	Brash Entertainment
Space Combat	2004	Laminar Research	Laminar Research
SpaceChem	2011	Zachtronics Industries	Zachtronics Industries
Space Empires IV	2000	Malfador Machinations	Shrapnel Games, Strategy First
Space Empires V	2006	Malfador Machinations	Strategy First
Space Empires: Starfury	2003	Malfador Machinations	Shrapnel Games
Space Giraffe	2007	Llamasoft	Llamasoft
Space Hulk: Ascension	2014	Full Control	Full Control
Space Hulk: Vengeance of the Blood Angels	1996	Krisalis Software	Electronic Arts
Space Quest 6	1995	Sierra Entertainment	Sierra Entertainment
Space Rangers	2002	Elemental Games	1C Company, Micro Application
Space Rangers 2: Dominators	2004	Elemental Games	1C Company
Space Shuttle Mission 2007	2008	Exciting Simulations	Simsquared Ltd.
Space Siege	2008	Gas Powered Games	Sega
Space Wreck	2023	Pahris Entertainment	Pahris Entertainment
Spaceward Ho!	1992	Delta Tao Software	Delta Tao Software
Spartan	2004	Slitherine Strategies	Slitherine Strategies
Spec Ops: The Line	2012	Yager Development	2K
Special Force 2: Tale of the Truthful Pledge	2007	Might 3D	Hezbollah Central Internet Bureau
Spectromancer	2008	Apus Software, Three Donkeys LLC	Apus Software, Three Donkeys LLC
The Spectrum Retreat	2018	Dan Smith Studios	Ripstone Games
Speed Busters	1998	Ubi Soft	Ubi Soft
Speed Challenge: Jacques Villeneuve's Racing Vision	2002	Ubisoft	Ubisoft
Speed Demons	1999	EMG	Microids
Speedball 2 Tournament	2007	Kylotonn	Frogster Interactive Pictures
Speedboat Attack	1997	Criterion Studios	Telstar Electronic Studios
Spellbound!	1998	The Learning Company	The Learning Company
Spellcross	1998	Cauldron Ltd.	JRC Interactive
SpellForce: The Order of Dawn	2003	Phenomic Game Development	Encore, Inc.
SpellForce 2: Shadow Wars	2006	Phenomic Game Development	JoWooD Productions
Spelunky	2008	Derek Yu	Independent
Spider-Man (2000 video game)	2000	Neversoft	Activision
Spider-Man (2002 video game)	2002	Treyarch, Digital Eclipse Software	Activision
Spider-Man 2 (2004 video game)	2004	Treyarch, The Fizz Factor, Vicarious Visions, Digital Eclipse, Backbone Entertainment, Aspyr Media	Activision
Spider-Man: Friend or Foe	2007	Beenox	Activision
Spider-Man: Web of Shadows	2008	Amaze Entertainment	Activision
Split/Second	2010	Black Rock Studio	Disney Interactive Studios
SpongeBob SquarePants Movie	2004	AWE Games	THQ
SpongeBob SquarePants: Battle for Bikini Bottom	2003	AWE Games, Heavy Iron Studios, Vicarious Visions	THQ
SpongeBob SquarePants: Employee of the Month	2002	AWE Games	THQ
SpongeBob SquarePants: Lights, Camera, Pants!	2005	AWE Games, THQ Studio Australia, WayForward Technologies	THQ
SpongeBob SquarePants: Operation Krabby Patty	2001	AWE Games	THQ
Spore	2008	Maxis	Electronic Arts
Spore Creature Creator	2008	Maxis	Electronic Arts
Spore Galactic Adventures	2009	Maxis	Electronic Arts
Sports Car GT	1999	Image Space Incorporated	Electronic Arts
Spy Fox in "Dry Cereal"	1997	Humongous Entertainment	Atari
Spy Fox 2: "Some Assembly Required"	1999	Humongous Entertainment	Atari
Spy Fox 3: "Operation Ozone"	2001	Humongous Entertainment	Atari
SpyHunter	2001	Paradigm Entertainment, Point of View, Inc., Sidhe Interactive	Midway Games
SpyHunter 2	2003	Angel Studios	Midway Games
Spycraft: The Great Game	1996	Activision	Activision
Squirrel with a Gun	2024	Dee Dee Creations LLC	Maximum Entertainment
Stacked with Daniel Negreanu	2006	5000ft	Myelin Media
Stairs	2015	GreyLight Entertainment	Digital Tribe Games
Stalin vs. Martians	2009	Black Wing Foundation	Paradox Interactive
Stalingrad	2005	DTF Games	BlackBean Games, 1C Games
Star Defender Series	2005	Awem studio	Awem studio
Star General	1996	Catware	Strategic Simulations
Star Hammer: The Vanguard Prophecy	2015	Black Lab Games	Slitherine Software
Star Trek DAC	2009	Naked Sky Entertainment, Bad Robot Interactive	Paramount Digital Entertainment
Star Trek Generations	1997	Microprose	Microprose
Star Trek Online	2010	Cryptic Studios	Atari
Star Trek: Armada	2000	Activision, Mad Doc Software	Activision
Star Trek: Armada II	2001	Mad Doc Software	Activision
Star Trek: Away Team	2001	Reflexive Entertainment	Activision
Star Trek: Borg	1996	Simon & Schuster	Simon & Schuster
Star Trek: Bridge Commander	2002	Totally Games	Activision
Star Trek: ConQuest Online	2000	Genetic Anomalies	Activision Publishing
Star Trek: Deep Space Nine: Dominion Wars	2001	Gizmo Games	Simon & Schuster
Star Trek: Deep Space Nine: The Fallen	2000	The Collective	Simon & Schuster
Star Trek: Elite Force II	2003	Ritual Entertainment	Activision
Star Trek: Hidden Evil	1999	Presto Studios	Activision
Star Trek: Klingon Academy	2000	14 Degrees East	Interplay Entertainment
Star Trek: Legacy	2006	Mad Doc Software	Bethesda Softworks
Star Trek: New Worlds	2000	14 Degrees East	Interplay Entertainment
Star Trek: Starfleet Academy	1997	StarFleet Academy Software, Interplay, High Voltage Software	Interplay Entertainment
Star Trek: Starfleet Command	1999	Interplay Entertainment	Interplay Entertainment
Star Trek: Starfleet Command II: Empires at War	2000	Taldren	Interplay Entertainment
Star Trek: Starfleet Command III	2002	Taldren	Activision
Star Trek: Starship Creator	1998	Imergy	Simon & Schuster
Star Trek: Starship Creator Warp II	2000	Imergy	Simon & Schuster
Star Trek: Birth of the Federation	1999	Microprose	Hasbro
Star Trek: The Game Show	1998	Sound Source Interactive	Sound Source Interactive
Star Trek: The Next Generation: Klingon Honor Guard	1998	MicroProse	MicroProse
Star Trek: Voyager – Elite Force	2000	Raven Software	Activision
Star Warped	1997	Parroty Interactive	Palladium Interactive
Star Wars Battlefront	2015	DICE	Electronic Arts
Star Wars Battlefront II	2017	DICE	Electronic Arts
Star Wars Episode I: Racer	1999	LucasArts	LucasArts
Star Wars Episode I: The Phantom Menace	1999	Big Ape Productions	LucasArts
Star Wars Galaxies	2003	Sony Online Entertainment	LucasArts
Star Wars Galaxies: Jump to Lightspeed	2004	Sony Online Entertainment	LucasArts
Star Wars Jedi: Fallen Order	2019	Respawn Entertainment	Electronic Arts
Star Wars Jedi Knight II: Jedi Outcast	2002	Raven Software, Vicarious Visions	LucasArts, Activision, Aspyr Media, CyberFront
Star Wars Jedi Knight: Dark Forces II	1997	LucasArts	LucasArts
Star Wars Jedi Knight: Jedi Academy	2003	Raven Software	LucasArts, Activision
Star Wars Jedi Knight: Mysteries of the Sith	1998	LucasArts	LucasArts
Star Wars: Battlefront	2004	Pandemic Studios	LucasArts
Star Wars: Battlefront II	2005	Pandemic Studios	LucasArts
Star Wars: Droid Works	1998	Lucas Learning	Lucas Learning
Star Wars: Empire at War	2006	Petroglyph Games	LucasArts
Star Wars: Empire at War: Forces of Corruption	2006	Petroglyph	LucasArts
Star Wars Episode I: Battle for Naboo	2000	Factor 5, LucasArts	LucasArts
Star Wars: Force Commander	2000	LucasArts, Ronin Entertainment	LucasArts
Star Wars: Galactic Battlegrounds	2001	LucasArts, Ensemble Studios	LucasArts
Star Wars Knights of the Old Republic II: The Sith Lords	2004	Obsidian Entertainment	LucasArts
Star Wars: Rebellion	1998	Coolhand Interactive	LucasArts
Star Wars: Republic Commando	2005	LucasArts	LucasArts, Activision
Star Wars: Rogue Squadron	1998	Factor 5, LucasArts	LucasArts
Star Wars: Shadows of the Empire	1997	LucasArts	LucasArts
Star Wars: Starfighter	2001	LucasArts	LucasArts
Star Wars: The Clone Wars – Republic Heroes	2009	Krome Studios	LucasArts
Star Wars: The Force Unleashed	2008	LucasArts	LucasArts
Star Wars: The Old Republic	2011	BioWare	LucasArts
Star Wars: TIE Fighter	2001	Totally Games	LucasArts
Star Wars: X-Wing Alliance	1999	Totally Games	LucasArts
Star Wars: X-Wing vs. TIE Fighter	1997	Totally Games	LucasArts
Star Wars: Yoda Stories	1997	LucasArts	LucasArts
Star Wolves	2004	X-bow Software	1C Company
StarCraft	1998	Blizzard Entertainment	Blizzard Entertainment, Sierra Entertainment
StarCraft: Brood War	1998	Saffire, Blizzard Entertainment	Blizzard Entertainment, Sierra Entertainment
StarCraft II: Heart of the Swarm	2013	Blizzard Entertainment	Blizzard Entertainment
StarCraft II: Legacy of the Void	2015	Blizzard Entertainment	Blizzard Entertainment
StarCraft II: Wings of Liberty	2010	Blizzard Entertainment	Blizzard Entertainment
Stardew Valley	2016	ConcernedApe	ConcernedApe
Starfield	2023	Bethesda Game Studios	Bethesda Softworks
Starfield: Shattered Space	2024	Bethesda Game Studios	Bethesda Softworks
Starlancer	2000	Digital Anvil	Microsoft
Starpoint Gemini	2010	Little Green Men Games	Iceberg Interactive
Starpoint Gemini 2	2014	Little Green Men Games	Iceberg Interactive
Starpoint Gemini 3	2019	Little Green Men Games	Little Green Men Games
Starpoint Gemini Warlords	2017	Little Green Men Games	Iceberg Interactive
Stars!	1995	Jeff Johnson, Jeff McBride	Empire Interactive
Starscape	2004	Moonpod	Moonpod
Starshatter: The Gathering Storm	2006	Destroyer Studios	Matrix Games
Starship Titanic	1998	The Digital Village	Simon & Schuster Interactive
Starship Troopers	2005	Strangelite	Empire Interactive
Starship Troopers: Terran Ascendancy	2000	Blue Tongue Entertainment	Microprose
Starsiege	1999	Dynamix	Dynamix
Starsky & Hutch	2003	Mind's Eye Productions	Empire Interactive
Startopia	2001	Mucky Foot Productions	Eidos Interactive
State of Decay	2013	Undead Labs	Microsoft Studios
State of Decay 2	2018	Undead Labs	Microsoft Studios
State of Emergency	2003	VIS Entertainment	Global Star Software
State of War	2001	Cypron Studios	Crystal Interactive
The Static Speaks My Name	2015	the whale husband	the whale husband
Steel Division 2	2019	Eugen Systems	Eugen Systems
Steel Division: Normandy 44	2017	Eugen Systems	Paradox Interactive
Steelrising	2022	Spiders	Nacon
Steer Madness	2004	Veggie Games Inc	Veggie Games Inc
Stellar Blade	2025	Shift Up	Sony Interactive Entertainment
Stellaris	2016	Paradox Development Studio	Paradox Interactive
Stephen King's F13	2000	Presto Studios	Blue Byte
Steven Spielberg's Director's Chair	1996	Knowledge Adventure	Knowledge Adventure
Still There	2019	GhostShark Games	Iceberg Interactive
Still Wakes the Deep	2024	The Chinese Room	Sumo Group
The Stomping Land	2014	SuperCrit	SuperCrit
Stories Untold	2017	No Code	Devolver Digital
Storm: Frontline Nation	2009	Colossai Studios	SimBin Studios
Stormrise	2009	The Creative Assembly	Sega
A Story About My Uncle	2014	Gone North Games	Coffee Stain Studios
Stranded Deep	2022	Beam Team Games	Beam Team Games
Stranded: Alien Dawn	2023	Haemimont Games	Frontier Foundry
Strange Horticulture	2022	Bad Viking	Iceberg Interactive
Stranglehold	2007	Midway Chicago	Midway Games
Strategic Command: European Theater	2002	Fury Software	Battlefront.com
Stray	2022	BlueTwelve Studio	Annapurna Interactive
Stray Blade	2023	Point Blank Games	505 Games
Street Fighter 30th Anniversary Collection	2018	Capcom	Capcom
Street Fighter Alpha	1997	Capcom	Capcom
Street Fighter Alpha 2	1996	Capcom	Capcom
Street Fighter IV	2008	Dimps, Capcom	Capcom
Street Hacker	2004	VirtuWeb Interactive	VirtuWeb Interactive
Street Racing Syndicate	2004	Eutechnyx, Streamline Studios	Namco
Streets of SimCity	1997	Maxis	Maxis, Electronic Arts
Strike Fighters: Project 1	2002	Third Wire Productions	Strategy First
Strike Fighters 2	2008	Third Wire Productions	Third Wire Productions
Strike Fighters 2: Vietnam	2009	Third Wire Productions	Third Wire Productions
Strong Bad's Cool Game for Attractive People	2008	Telltale Games	Telltale Games
Stronghold	2001	Firefly Studios	Take 2 Interactive, Gathering of Developers
Stronghold 2	2005	Firefly Studios	2K Games
Stronghold Legends	2006	Firefly Studios	2K Games
Stronghold: Crusader	2002	Firefly Studios	Take 2 Interactive and God Games
Stubbs the Zombie in Rebel Without a Pulse	2005	Wideload Games	Aspyr Media
Stunt GP	2001	Team17	Eon Digital Entertainment
Stupid Invaders	2000	Ubi Soft	Xilam
Stygian: Reign of the Old Ones	2019	Cultic Games	1C Entertainment
Styx: Master of Shadows	2014	Cyanide	Focus Home Interactive
Styx: Shards of Darkness	2017	Cyanide	Focus Home Interactive
Su-27 Flanker	1996	Eagle Dynamics	Strategic Simulations, Inc.
Sub Culture	1997	Criterion Studios	Ubi Soft
Submarine Titans	2000	Ellipse Studios	Strategy First
Subnautica	2018	Unknown Worlds Entertainment	Unknown Worlds Entertainment
Subnautica: Below Zero	2021	Unknown Worlds Entertainment	Unknown Worlds Entertainment
Subsurface Circular	2017	Mike Bithell Games	Mike Bithell Games
Subterranean Animism	2008	Team Shanghai Alice	Team Shanghai Alice
Sudeki	2005	Climax Group	Microsoft Game Studios
The Suffering	2004	Surreal Software	Midway Games
The Suffering: Ties That Bind	2005	Surreal Software	Midway Games
The Suicide of Rachel Foster	2020	One-O-One Games	Daedalic Entertainment
Sumerian Six	2024	Artificer	Devolver Digital
Summer Athletics	2008	49Games	Digital Entertainment Pool
Summer Session	2008	Hanako Games, Tycoon Games	Hanako Games, Tycoon Games
Summerhouse	2024	Friedemann Allmenröder	Future Friends Games
Summoner	2000	Volition	THQ
SunAge	2007	Vertex4	Lighthouse Interactive
Sun Haven	2023	Pixel Sprout Studios	Pixel Sprout Studios
Sunset	2015	Tale of Tales	Tale of Tales
Sunset Overdrive	2014	Insomniac Games	Microsoft Studios
Super Amazing Wagon Adventure	2013	sparsevector	sparsevector
Super Animal Royale	2021	Pixile Studios	Pixile Studios
Super Battle Golf	2026	Brimstone	Oro Interactive
Super-Bikes Riding Challenge	2006	Milestone	Black Bean Games
Super Bubble Pop	2002	Zombie Studios	Jaleco
Super Columbine Massacre RPG!	2005	Danny Ledonne	
Super Lucky's Tale	2017	Playful	Microsoft Studios
Super Match Soccer	1998	Cranberry Source	Acclaim Entertainment
Super Meat Boy	2010	Team Meat	Team Meat
Super Puzzle Bobble	2000	Taito	Acclaim Entertainment, Taito
Super Puzzle Fighter II Turbo	2007	Capcom	Capcom
Super Woden GP	2021	ViJuDa	ViJuDa
Superball Arcade	2003	Cheeky Monkey Software	Cheeky Monkey Software
Supercar Street Challenge	2001	Exakt Entertainment	Activision
Superhot	2016	Superhot Team	Superhot Team
Superhot: Mind Control Delete	2020	Superhot Team	Superhot Team
Superliminal	2019	Pillow Castle Games	Pillow Castle Games
SuperPower 2	2004	GolemLabs	DreamCatcher Interactive
Superstars V8 Racing	2009	Milestone srl	Black Bean Games
Supreme Commander	2007	Gas Powered Games	THQ
Supreme Commander 2	2010	Gas Powered Games	Square Enix
Supreme Commander: Forged Alliance	2007	Gas Powered Games	THQ
Supreme Ruler 2010	2005	BattleGoat Studios	Strategy First
Supreme Ruler 2020	2008	BattleGoat Studios	Paradox Interactive
Supreme Warrior	1996	Digital Pictures	Digital Pictures
Surf's Up	2007	Ubisoft Quebec	Ubisoft
The Surge	2017	Deck13 Interactive	Focus Home Interactive
The Surge 2	2019	Deck13 Interactive	Focus Home Interactive
Survival Crisis Z	2004	Ska Studios	Ska Studios
Survival Project	2003	IO Entertainment	Happy Digi, HanbitSoft, et al.
Surviving the Aftermath	2021	Iceflake Studios	Paradox Interactive
Surviving Mars	2018	Haemimont Games, Abstraction Games	Paradox Interactive
Suzerain	2020	Torpor Games	Fellow Traveller Games
Sven Co-op	1999	Sven Co-op Team	
Swamp Buggy Racing	2000	Daylight Productions	WizardWorks
Swarm	1998	Reflexive Entertainment	Reflexive Entertainment
SWAT 3: Close Quarters Battle	1999	Sierra Northwest	Sierra Entertainment
SWAT 4	2005	Irrational Games	Vivendi Universal Games
Swing	1997	Software 2000	Software 2000
Switchball	2007	Atomic Elbow	Sierra On-Line
Sword of the Stars	2006	Kerberos Productions	Paradox Interactive, Lighthouse Interactive
Sydney 2000	2000	Attention to Detail	Eidos Interactive
Sydney Mystery, The	2003	Twilight Software	Twilight Software
Sylvio	2015	Stroboskop	Stroboskop
Symbiocom	1998	Istvan Pely Productions	Bethesda Softworks
Syndicate	2012	Starbreeze Studios	Electronic Arts
Syndrome	2016	Camel 101, Bigmoon Entertainment	Camel 101
System Shock	2023	Nightdive Studios	Prime Matter
System Shock 2	1999	Irrational Games, Looking Glass Studios	Electronic Arts
