= Superball (disambiguation) =

Superball or Super ball may refer to:

- Super Ball, a toy bouncing ball based on a type of synthetic rubber invented in 1964 by chemist Norman Stingley
- Superball Music, a German independent record label
- Superball+, an EP from American indie rock band Helium
- Superball Arcade, a purchasable shareware computer game for PC

== See also ==
- Super Bowl
