= Silver Knight =

Silver Knight may refer to:

- Silver Knight (horse), a thoroughbred racehorse from New Zealand
- Silver Knight Awards, an awards program recognizing student achievement in South Florida
- Silver Knights (video game), a mech action/fighting game
- Henderson Silver Knights, a hockey team based in Henderson, NV
- Syracuse Silver Knights, an indoor soccer team based in Syracuse, NY
- Silver Knight, a character in .hack
