= The Signal from Tölva =

2017 video game

The Signal From Tölva
- Developer: Big Robot
- Publisher: Big Robot
- Platforms: Windows; MacOS; Linux
- Release: WW: April 10, 2017
- Genre: First-person shooter
- Mode: Single-player

The Signal From Tölva is an open world first-person shooter game developed and published by Big Robot. It was released on April 10, 2017 for Windows, MacOS and Linux. Taking place in the far future, the player character is a hacker-for-hire who hijacks a surveyor robot to investigate the barren world of Tölva in search of a strange signal. The game contains walking simulator elements, with tactical engagements being broken up by large segments of slow-paced exploration.

The game received mixed reviews from critics, who praised its setting and concept art-inspired aesthetic, but criticized its slow walking speed and the simplicity of its gameplay.

== Plot ==
The player character is a mysterious hacker who was contacted by The Broker, who hired them to infiltrate The Surveyors, a faction of robots who are probing the planet Tölva. The player can remotely commandeer drones located on the planet's surface, but is opposed by two other robotic factions, the Zealots and Bandits, who will attack on sight.

== Gameplay ==
The game alternates between combat in a first-person shooter style and exploration while traversing the planet's surface in a robot chassis. Robots have access to laser-based weaponry in the form of assault rifles and beam rifles. They also have a defensive shield system, and an area-of-effect attack that can disrupt enemies or heal allies. The player gains the ability to reprogram other robots to assist them in battle.

During exploration segments, the player can use a scanner to search for hidden messages and upgrades. The game contains a day/night cycle.

== Development ==
The game's visual aesthetic was inspired by the concept art of Ian McQue, who also designed the robots featured in the game.

== Reception ==
Reception

Aggregate score
| Aggregator | Score |
|---|---|
| Metacritic | 69/100 |

Review scores
| Publication | Score |
|---|---|
| IGN | 6.5/10 |
| PC Gamer (US) | 80/100 |

The Signal From Tölva received mixed reviews, with an aggregate score of 69/100 on Metacritic.

Chris Schilling of PC Gamer rated the game 80/100, calling it a "lean, intelligent sci-fi shooter" with a "fascinating setting" and a "watchmaker's eye for detail". He criticized the fact that the game can be "unfair" due to the existence of friendly fire against allies and no way to defend and fortify bases from other factions. Edwin Evans-Thirlwell of Eurogamer called the game a "dark, frustrating work", praising the game's artistic style, story and sound, but criticized the "strong element of grinding", saying the game later becomes "tedious". Glenn Wigmore of IGN rated the game 6.5/10, calling its concept "promising" and its visuals and audio "awe-inspiring", but calling its movement speed "plodding" and the plot only "partially" compelling.
