= Secret of the Solstice =

2007 video game

- Developer: DNC Entertainment
- Publishers: DNC Entertainment (Korea); Outspark (International/English)
- Platform: Windows
- Release: December 7, 2007 (Open Beta); January 9, 2008 (Commercial Launch); August 11, 2011 (Closed)
- Genre: Fantasy Massively Multiplayer Online Role-playing Game
- Mode: MMO

Secret of the Solstice was a free-to-play MMORPG (Massively Multiplayer Online Role Playing Game) developed and published by DNC Entertainment in Korea and hosted by Outspark in the international English market. It is the second MMO published by Outspark.

Secret of the Solstice features a cute, anime-inspired visual style. Player characters, monsters, and non-player characters (NPCs) are represented as 2D sprites while environments and background elements are rendered in 3D.

US Secret of the Solstice was subsequently shut down by its publisher 'Outspark' for 'undisclosed reasons'. Any and all time and real money that players put into the game was lost. However Outspark offered a character merge to 'Solstice Reborn' a beta of a new release of Solstice. On October 24, 2011, the Beta was released for 1 week until it closed and Outspark removed all traces of its existence. Outspark also shut down their forums for comments on 'Solstice'.

Secret of the Solstice was re-launched in 2020 with the name "Xen Rebirth" as a non-profit fan-operated private server, running entirely on donations. The server source code for this version remains proprietary.

In 2022, the Korean company 'Playworks' acquired all rights to the 'Xen Online' IP from DNC, which includes Secret of the Solstice.

== Story ==
It is said that during days in a time long past, peace was more than an empty word. A great King, mighty and fair, ruled the land of Xen with responsibility entrusted to him by the gods before they left the mortal plane. With this trust came the Solstice Sphere, an ancient and mysterious artifact possessing great power. In time the king married and the union yielded twin daughters, Adeline and Marian. They were like the sun and the moon, opposites but forever entwined with the future of Xen.

Time passed and the princesses grew, reaching womanhood before the eyes of their people. Adeline became a shining beauty, like the sun with a heart of gold. The people of Xen adored her. Always at her father's side, she watched and learned as the King went about his duties. With a thirst for knowledge, she learned from the greatest teachers in the land. It was her destiny to one day inherit the throne and become the kingdom's future.

While Adeline became like the sun, Marian grew to become the moon. In the shadow of her sister she became envious, and the darkness of jealousy soaked her heart. While admirers heaped endless praise on Adeline, seeds of bitterness and resentment began to grow in Marian. Hidden under the sheen of superficial happiness, they waited for the perfect moment to bloom.

Years passed, and the princesses approached the age of 18. On their birthday Adeline received a special gift from her parents—the Solstice Sphere! On that day the mysterious ancient relic passed from father to daughter. But it was far from a glorious occasion. A series of horrific events would soon take place and ultimately drench the land of Xen in the suffering it knows today.

== Character Creation ==
On each server of the game, players can have up to five characters. These characters can be either male or female. Both genders have three hair styles, of which each have three possible colors.

== Character Classes ==
=== Xenian ===
Residents of Xen. All players start as Xenians and specialize to another class later.

=== Squire ===
Fighters train in the arts of the Akarinas sword, and are awarded their class after qualifying to join a vigilance committee. They have strong melee attacks and high defensive capabilities but have weaker skills than the other classes. Squires can become Knights at level 66, Warriors at level 96 and Warlords at level 131.

=== Apprentice ===
Magician apprentices who wield magic to defend themselves, fighting from a distance. They can deal massive damage with their spells, but are vulnerable in melee combat as they have low armor and hit points. Apprentices can become Mages at level 66, Wizards at level 96 and Archmages at level 131.

=== Neophyte ===
Neophytes are known for their cunning and speed. They have powerful attacks but tend to have medium hit points and defense. Neophytes can class change to Rogue at 66, Assassin at 96 and finally to Shadow Master at 131.

=== Acolyte ===
Well on their way to being a full cleric, acolytes focus on helping others with their protective, healing magic. They have powerful healing and supportive magic as well as decent melee skills. Acolytes become Clerics at level 66, Priests at level 96, and finally Paladins at level 131

=== Prestige Classes ===
At level 45, both the Neophyte and Acolyte have the ability to move on to a different class called 'Prestige Classes'. The Neophyte can become a Scout, while an Acolyte can become a Disciple. At 80, these two can advance again. Scouts become Archers and Disciples become Templars. Finally, at level 112, they reach full potential and become a Ranger (if Neophyte) and Holy Avenger (if Acolyte).

== Statistics ==
Upon leveling up, players may increase any one of their six stats and customize their character. The six statistics are: Power, Agility, Intelligence, Wisdom, Stamina, and Mentality. Power increases a player's damage, and weight capacity. Too much power decreases attack speed. Agility increases dodge rate, attack speed, and attack power. Intelligence is beneficial to ranged characters. While it increases a spell's damage, it does nothing for close ranged characters. Wisdom increases a player's maximum MP or Mana Points, and increases magic defense. Stamina increases a player's maximum HP or Health Points. Mentality increases accuracy rate, defense, magic defense, and skill casting speed.

== Gameplay ==
Players learn skills upon changing jobs. A Skill Book is required to learn skills. There are three skill types: single-target "General Skills", multi-target "Area of Effect(AoE) Skills", and "Buff Skills", which strengthen characters. Skills are limited according to the character's level and job.

Secret of the Solstice supports a Party System which allows up to eight characters to team up for adventures. Experience is distributed to the participants depending on their levels. There is a bonus for variety in the party as well as a bonus for having a member of the starter class in your party

Secret of the Solstice players have a three-tab inventory. Spend, Gear, and Other. Items in the 'Spend' tab are consumable items. Items in the 'Gear' tab are equipable items. Items in the 'Other' tab are miscellaneous items. These are often quest-related. Players can also engage in a quest to obtain pets. Different types of pets can be obtained from various 'pet merchants' in the game.

All classes have equipment, or Gear, that is restricted to their class. When players undergo their first class change, they are granted their equipment by the leader of the class, along with an accessory.

When a player dies in Secret of the Solstice, they are sent back to the last recorded town with a minor loss of experience.

Secret of Solstice does contain a player controlled marketplace. Players can choose to sell items in their inventory for whatever price they choose.

== Messaging ==
Secret of the Solstice offers four modes of in-game chat. Local, Party, Guild, and Shout. Local Chat consists of the area around the player's screen. In Party Chat only members of the player's party will be allowed to see the message. In Guild chat only members of the player's guild will be allowed to see the message. Shout chat is used so that a player may send a message to anyone on the map by using a 'White Egg'. Players also have the ability to message and Private Message other players in the game.

== Reviews ==
OnRPG.com says: "Whilst originality and variety may not be the high point of this wonderful story, the constant events, the gorgeous community and the perfected music and presentation of this quaint interactive page turner are very much in place and will drag you back time and time again to finish your narration. 8/10."

MMOhuts.com says: "Although Secret of the Solstice isn't anything revolutionary the game is still genuinely fun. The game's graphics are incredible and the gameplay is extremely fluid. The game however has very limited PvP options and only a medium sized community. If you're looking for a new game to try though, and have already played all of the 'well known games', Secret of the Solstice is definitely worth trying."

TenTonHammer.com says: "If I were to describe Secret of the Solstice to my best friend in the most brutal terms possible, I'd say it's a charming title that should have been a dungeon crawler adventure game but that tried to get in on the MMOG bandwagon instead. Some of the best features in SoS scream for the game to play offline in a single player experience. While all of those features are still enjoyable in a MMOG, they make for a lackluster experience. Without a doubt, Outspark will find an audience that is bananas over this game, but I can't help but feel confused by what it is trying to be. I never got around to all of the bells and whistles (crafting and such) offered in SoS because I was not motivated by the game play. 2.5/5."
