= Bucket Detective =

2017 video game

- Steam header image
- Developer: The Whale Husband
- Publisher: the whale husband
- Designer: Jesse Barksdale
- Programmer: Samu Kovanen
- Artist: Mikael Immonen
- Composer: Denis Zlobin
- Engine: Unity
- Platforms: Windows, OS X
- Release: 16 February 2017
- Genre: Adventure
- Mode: Single player

Bucket Detective is a video game released in 2018 by The Whale Husband, a collaboration between American independent developer Jesse Barksdale and Finnish developer Samu Kovanen. Described as a "dark comedy horror game", Bucket Detective is an adventure game in which an illiterate and perverse author endures personal and moral sacrifices made to a cult in order to receive the literary inspiration to publish a novel. Bucket Detective, in line with Barksdale's previous game, The Static Speaks My Name, was strongly influenced by personal themes of "depression, anxiety and obsession" and designed in ways to disorient and confuse the player. The game, which was the first commercial project from Barksdale, received a positive reception from critics, with particular attention directed at the game's unusual and grotesque premise and disturbing content.

== Plot ==
Bucket Detective is played from the perspective of David Davids, a narcissistic, sexually neurotic, misogynistic man of middle age. An illiterate narration describes Davidson's desire to write a best-selling novel, Bucket Detective, because "famous book make it impossible for girls to resist sex [sic]". A friend of Davids directs to a mysterious building under the promise that if they complete all that is asked of them, they will get what they desire. At various stages of navigating the building, Davids must dismember parts of his body, to receive passages from Bucket Detective, ultimately leading him to sever his finger, hand, and feet in pursuit of finishing the book.

The player's journey through the building is guided by found diary entries and an audio tour narrated by Gwen Sleeveless, a man raised as a child in service to the occupants of the building. As the player explores the building, Sleeveless' recordings explains that it is occupied by a cult who worship the Dark Lord Mishreal, founded by the Two Fathers: Dr. Z.W. Francis and Jedidah Holcombe. The player inadvertently becomes initiated to the cult and pass through a series of tests. Their final task is to bring about the rebirth of the Dark Lord through receiving the Genderless Child, a baby borne from Beth, a woman imprisoned and impregnated against her will by the Two Fathers. To complete the ritual, the player is tasked with delivering the Genderless Child to an elevator, upon which its closure causes the elevator to spew blood, implying the child has been sacrificed to the Dark Lord.

The game features five different endings depending on the choices made by the player during gameplay, with each providing an epilogue on the success or failure of Davidson's book, Bucket Detective. The player is presented with the choice at the end of the game to either leave, leave with Beth's child, or complete the sacrifice to bring about the rebirth of the Dark Lord and the end of the world. In most cases, Davids gains little insight or benefit from his experience, using the publishing of Bucket Detective to pick up women and ignore the consequences of his actions. In another instance, if the player leaves the baby behind and fails to complete the ritual, Davids realises he is a masochist and indulges in his self-destructive tendencies by removing all of his other body parts. However, the player is also able to exit the building upon entry, ending the game immediately.

== Gameplay ==
A screenshot of Bucket Detective, depicting the "finger sacrifice" machine.

Bucket Detective is a narrative-based adventure game in which players progress the game through exploration of the cult's building, with limited interaction with objects including to read notes providing background context, use items to complete puzzles, and press buttons to play Sleeveless' audio tour in various areas of the building. In some stages, progression to new areas is undertaken by the mechanic of interacting with machines to sacrifice parts of the player's body in order to contribute one of four sentences to 'the book Bucket Detective, selected through dialog options. As the game's story progresses, the player sacrifices larger and more impairing parts of their body to continue, such as their legs, ultimately affecting player movement from a walk to a crawl, or moving in a wheelchair. Barksdale stated these mechanics were based in a desire for the player to be "constantly aware of their body in a way the players normally are not".

The game also features several puzzles designed with the purpose of serving as steps in the ritual to bring about Mishreal's rebirth. Puzzle mechanics include the use of items, including finding stamps from separate offices of the Fathers to process a document, and using knowledge of the game's story to resolve the puzzles: for instance, players must complete a puzzle by positioning the urns of the Fathers, solvable by concealing the urns from one another in reflection of the narrative that the Fathers could not stand to be within sight of one another. Barksdale stated that the design of these puzzles intended to "teach the player more about the game world" by "re-enacting events which occurred (in) the game's lore." However, some puzzles, including a pattern-based "meditation game", were designed to be intentionally incoherent to induce a sense of disorientation and confusion.

== Development ==
Following the release of there previous game in 2015, The Static Speaks My Name, Barksdale entered a period of creative frustration marked by a period of unemployment and illness. Barksdale began development of Bucket Detective in August 2015, immediately prior to commencing study for a Master of Arts at Aalto University School of Arts, Design and Architecture. The game was developed collaboratively by Barksdale over a seventeen-month period between 2015 and 2017 with his Aalto University colleagues Samu Kovanen as a co-developer and programmer, and input from Mikael Immonen as a 3D artist, and Denis Zlobin as a composer. Co-designer Samu Kovanen stated that the game was developed as a "portfolio piece" that would represent "the best we could create by ourselves", with Kovanen minimising the use of third-party tools and dedicating time to implementing custom physics and character control systems to showcase the skills gained in the development process. Both Barksdale and Kovanen would use their development of Bucket Development as a case study for a thesis written in completion of their study at Aalto University. The development team secured a grant from the Finnish organisation AVEK (the Promotion Centre for Audiovisual Culture) to complete the project.

The writing and themes of Bucket Detective were strongly influenced by Barksdale's personal experiences. Barksdale stated that the overarching theme of the game is that "each of us has the ability to destroy ourselves in the pursuit of things we think will make us happy," in line with his personal experiences of "depression, anxiety and obsession" that run through his works, including The Static Speaks My Name. Barksdale stated that the game's body horror elements had been inspired by his repeated hospitalisation with appendicitis during this time. Furthermore, he stated his experiences with religious education in childhood also influenced the themes around cults in the game, using religious archetypes of "a charismatic leader, salvation comes to those who sacrifice, (and) a day of rebirth (and) judgement which is coming soon." Barksdale stated the game's visual style was drawn heavily from the Gothic Revival aesthetic shown in films such as Rosemary's Baby and The Grand Budapest Hotel, and the design of the New York apartments The Dakota. Further, Barksdale attempted for the game to be "funnier" and possess more "overt humor" than its predecessor, The Static Speaks My Name, using cutscenes and dialogue that balance a "funny" tone with "weird and dark" content.

Bucket Detective was showcased in April 2017 at A MAZE, an international festival showcasing art and experimental games. The game was selected as one of 25 nominees at the festival, with the game contesting the narrative category. Barksdale personally attended the event to exhibit the game on April 26–29, 2017.

== Reception ==
Bucket Detective received generally positive reviews from critics, with praise directed for its unorthodox and compelling tone. Writing for PC Gamer, Tom Sykes stated the game was a "disturbing, gross, and occasionally pretty funny," stating "there's some truly horrible subject matter, and a bit of gore, but also an assortment of wonderful illustrations, a great script and a memorable soundtrack." Wiehahn Diederichs of Gearburn described the game as "incomprehensibly bizarre" and "one of those games that, upon completion, will leave you speechless and confused as your brain helplessly attempts to process what you’ve just experienced," praising the game for "(challenging) established notions of gameplay." Save or Quit praised the game's design as a "dark, twisted and cynical piece of work" that "captures a lust for detail" through its visual and level design.

Several critics expressed mixed views on the role of the characterisation in the game. Writing for Unwinnable, Khee Hoon Chan noted that "there hasn't been a lot of video games that feature protagonists as repugnant as Davids," stating "by featuring an irksome, self-absorbed man as its lead, Bucket Detective has shown itself to be hilarious, yet horrifying in its stark, detached presentation of abuse and violence," praising the characterisation for avoiding an "overbearing narrative" and "emotional posturing". Adam Smith of Rock Paper Shotgun stated "David is such a ludicrous idiot that stepping into his shoes is just an excuse to use him as a punching bag, something that the game acknowledges, and when other characters elicit more sympathy with a few seconds of screen-time, there's no space to step outside David and away from his grim, grubby little path." Save or Quit found the character of Sleeveless to be "a character consistent with the overall tone and mood (of the game), and within that, a piercing social commentary on the dangers of misogyny, violence, and cult mentality."

Some critics expressed mixed to negative reception of the game's execution of its themes and narrative. Writing for Game Critics, Rebekah Ocker stated that the game's "story left something to be desired," finding that the game had a "persistent element of disjointedness" and implying that the treatment of themes of "pedophilia, rape and murder" in the game "felt wrong". Similarly, Rachael Brearton of Indie Hive described the game as "uncomfortable", dismissing the game as "an awkward combination of sensitive and potentially triggering subject matter and sporadic attempts at humour which is often difficult to laugh at and even feels distasteful at times." Pavan Shamdasani of the South China Morning Post gave a mixed review of the game, stating the game was "hard to recommend: it certainly achieves its goal, depicting a greedy, shameless human being and all the things he'd do to become a paperback writer. Barksdale has a warped sensibility, and it's certainly original – I'm just wondering if another medium would suit it better."

== Legacy ==
Barksdale stated that Bucket Detective was a success, selling "several thousand copies" as of eight months of release, and attributed its success along with The Static Speaks My Name to open avenues into professional work in the video game industry, such as writing for the 2018 title Overkill's The Walking Dead. In a postmortem of the game, although Barksdale expressed disappointment that Bucket Detective had been overshadowed by attention towards his previous work, The Static Speaks My Name, he stated the game helped him overcome the "pressure of making games" as a "false expectation", and gave him "freedom to have my next project be whatever the fuck I wanted it to be." Barksdale cited the significant planning and work in the creation of Bucket Detective as prompting a shift away from video game development, stating "there are still games I want to make, and I'd be surprised if I never make another game, but my focus has shifted."
