= The Sydney Mystery =

2003 video game

- Cover art
- Developer: Twilight Software
- Publisher: Twilight Software
- Designer: Brendan Reville
- Writer: Brendan Reville
- Composer: Brendan Reville
- Engine: Adventure Game Engine
- Platform: Windows
- Release: April 13, 2003
- Genre: Adventure
- Mode: Single-player

The Sydney Mystery is a point-and-click Adventure game released by American studio Twilight Software on April 13, 2003. The game takes place in Sydney, Australia.

== Plot ==
In the city of Sydney in Australia, a retired detective has been kidnapped. The detective's niece looks for leads to rescue him.

== Gameplay ==
The gameplay is simplified without the need to click on any verbal commands or items in an inventory. The player interacts with the current area by hovering the mouse over particular objects or any people present and left clicking to perform an action. The mouse pointer changes to an icon that matches the appropriate action. Right clicking cycles through any available items the player possess. Left clicking while holding the selected item uses it. Whenever the player leaves a starting area, the game switches to an over world map of Sydney, allowing the player to travel to any known locations to progress.

== Development ==
Brendan Reville was inspired by many story-driven Sierra and LucasArts adventure games to create his own, and distanced his title from other FMV video games instead hoping to make a first-person adventure game that happened to be photographed and filmed on location. He started the creation of the game from scratch in the year 2000. He programmed the entire game engine AGE (Adventure Game Engine), but much work had the project in progress for three years. In addition to coding the engine, Reville almost singlehandedly designed the game, photographed and filmed all live action sequences, scripted the game, compiled and created the art, video and sound, programmed the puzzles, recorded the dialogue, tested the game, made a demo, created an installer, built the website, and did PR. The game's budget was around $500. By Monday 9 September 2002, Brendan had presented his game to the Independent Games Festival.

=== Filming ===
Filming of the game was done in the very plot-centered city Sydney itself around 17 different locations with over 240 scenes in total. Capturing pictures was done using a wide-angled SLR Camera provided by Shanno Sanders. Paul Fiore also lent a digital video camera which was used together with a Shotgun microphone for quality filming. Due to the low-budget, the cast of 11 actors were either friends or friends-of-friends of Reville, and only one cast member had previous acting experience.

== Reception ==
Reception

Review scores
| Publication | Score |
|---|---|
| Adventure Gamers | 1.5/5 |
| Metzomagic | 2.5/5 |

Michelle Whicker of PC Gameworld argued that the game could be used as a public relations marketing tool for Sydney due to its use of several scenic locations throughout the city. Meanwhile, Alex Tait of Just Adventure described the game as the equivalent of buying a CD based on hearing one song on the radio only to be disappointed, and thought its unintentional humour was stylistically similar to that found in The Curse of Monkey Island and The Feeble Files.
