= Star Trek: Starship Creator Warp II =

2000 video game

- Developer: Imergy
- Publishers: NA: Simon & Schuster Interactive; EU: JoWooD
- Platforms: Windows, Mac OS
- Release: NA: June 12, 2000; UK: 2000
- Genre: Vehicle simulation
- Modes: Single-player, multiplayer

Star Trek: Starship Creator Warp II is an American computer-based vehicle simulation game released by Simon & Schuster Interactive in 2000, as a sequel to Star Trek: Starship Creator (1998). The game is backwards compatible with its predecessor, and allows for ships to be imported into the multi-player mode of Star Trek: Deep Space Nine: Dominion Wars (2001). The game allows the user to create their own starships, crew them with personnel from the Star Trek universe, and send them on missions.

== Gameplay ==
Star Trek: Starship Creator Warp II was a follow-up to Star Trek: Starship Creator, released in 1998. It enabled the player to build starships from the Star Trek universe, both from the era of Star Trek: The Original Series and later in the franchise. This involves fitting out the chosen type of starship with technology, including warp drives and weaponry, before selecting the ship's crew. The game also allowed for the player to import their own photos and create new crew members. Once created, the player can send up to two ships simultaneously on missions.

Warp II was designed to be backwards compatible with its predecessor, and also allowed for four types of ships to be exported to the multi-player mode of Star Trek: Deep Space Nine: Dominion Wars which was released in 2001. Because of this ability to connect with the later game, Warp II came packaged with Dominion Wars.

== Production ==
Star Trek: Starship Creator Warp II was the second Star Trek game to be published by Simon & Schuster. Writer Peter David and his wife Kathleen O'Shea David wrote ten missions for the game, but only three were used. The game was released internationally in both the United States on June 12, 2000, and in the United Kingdom that same year.

== Reception ==
Reception

Review scores
Publication	Score
AllGame	3.5/5
Electric Playground	4.5/10

Lisa Karen Savignano in her review for Allgame, said that the missions were varied and she enjoyed the ability to create missions, though the difficulty of creating them at first could be frustrating. She criticised the printing of the game manual on a poster but said that the compatibility with Star Trek: Deep Space Nine: Dominion Wars "augers well for continuous play". Maximum PC magazine listed it as one of its "Lemons of the Year" for 2000, saying that "It's worse than a hangover from drinking too much Romulan ale, or contracting Tribble VD."
