= Super Battle Golf =

2026 video game

- Developer: Brimstone
- Publisher: Oro Interactive
- Platforms: Windows; Nintendo Switch 2; PlayStation 5; Xbox Series X/S
- Release: Windows; 19 February 2026; Nintendo Switch 2, PlayStation 5, Xbox Series X/S; March 25, 2027
- Genre: Sports
- Modes: Single-player, multiplayer

Super Battle Golf is a 2026 multiplayer golf video game developed by Brimstone and published by Oro Interactive. It was released on 19 February 2026, for Windows, with versions for Nintendo Switch 2, PlayStation 5, and Xbox Series X/S launching March 25, 2027.

== Development ==
Super Battle Golf was first announced in January 2026. The game officially released the following month, on 19 February 2026.

== Gameplay ==
A player preparing to hit the ball at the beginning of a level

Up to eight players can compete together in a golf match, with the main feature being the inclusion of items that can be used to sabotage other players. The goal of each round is to score first, while avoiding attacks from other players. Hitting another player with a golf club grants a temporary speed boost to the attacker.

Items in the game include golf carts, which can be driven around the map, hit players, and include eight seats that all individuals can sit in. Land mines are also an item in the game, and can be placed by the player and hit with a golf club, before eventually exploding upon contact with a player or other object. Other items include guns, rocket launchers, and orbital lasers.

The game also has various cosmetics that can be purchased in the shop for in-game gold. Customizable items include replacement golf clubs, golf balls, and accessories for the character.

== Reception ==
In the four weeks following the game announcement, 100,000 Steam users wishlisted the game. It sold over 100,000 copies in the two days following the release.
