= ShadowFlare =

2001 video game

- Title screen
- Developer(s): Denyusha
- Publisher(s): Emurasoft
- Platform(s): Windows
- Release: Episode One: JP: October 2001; WW: October 2002; Full release February 13, 2003
- Genre(s): Action role-playing, hack and slash
- Mode(s): Single-player, multiplayer

ShadowFlare is an episodic action role-playing game developed by Denyusha and published by Emurasoft for Microsoft Windows. The game consisted of four episodes. The first episode was released in Japan in October 2001, with a worldwide release following in October 2002. The second episode was released on December 10, 2002. The third episode was released on January 10, 2003, and the fourth and final episode was released on February 13, 2003. The game was released as shareware on January 21, 2003 with the first episode made available as a free download.

The game is no longer available for purchase as of today, after the official site closed down in October 2013. The site returned online in 2020 but it is still impossible to legally obtain a copy of the game.

== Gameplay ==
In-game screenshot

The player starts their journey as a mercenary working for gold and precious items, in a world ruled by demons. As the player ventures through the ruins of the in-game world, they'll find out what happened and who or what is responsible for these events. After reaching a certain skill level, the player will be able to choose a new profession for their character, such as a warrior, wizard/witch, or hunter. The player will have an animal companion to fight alongside them. They will come across many acquaintances, enemies, and friends along the way, including the original demon himself, Dignosis, and his rival, the white angel Altecia.

=== Professions ===
In Shadowflare the player begins as a Mercenary until reaching level 5, when the profession automatically changes to Warrior. Upon reaching level 6 Hunter and Wizard will also be available.

- Mercenary Every character starts out as a Mercenary. They gain +40 HP, +10 Strength, +4 Attack, +4 Defense, +2 Magical Attack and +2 Magical Defence on level up.
- Warrior Warriors have a combo melee attack and they gain significantly more HP per level than other professions.
- Hunter Unlike other professions, the Hunter does not suffer a penalty in Attack when using bow-type weapons. Hunter is the only class to consistently improve walking speed.
- Wizard Although all professions can cast spells, Wizards gain access to spells earlier and get the best bonuses to MP and Magical Attack.

== Reception ==
ShadowFlare received generally negative reviews. Aggregate review website Metacritic assigned a score 49 out of 100 based on reviews from seven critics.
