= Shattered – Tale of the Forgotten King =

- Developer: Redlock Studio
- Publishers: Redlock Studio; Forthright Entertainment (consoles)
- Engine: Unreal Engine 4
- Platforms: Windows; Nintendo Switch; PlayStation 4; PlayStation 5
- Release: WW: February 17, 2021 (Win); WW: April 22, 2022 (PS4, PS5, NS)
- Genre: Action role-playing
- Mode: Single-player

Shattered – Tale of the Forgotten King is an action role-playing video game developed by Redlock Studio. Redlock released it for Windows in 2021, and it was ported to various consoles in 2022.

== Gameplay ==
After the disappearance of their king, a civilization falls to ruin. Shattered – Tale of the Forgotten King is a Soulslike, an action role-playing video game subgenre that focuses on exploration, careful timing in combat, and boss fights. These are presented from a Third-person perspective. It also includes elements of platform games, which are presented in 2.5D.

== Development ==
Redlock is a French game developer. Shattered – Tale of the Forgotten King was crowdfunded on Kickstarter in 2016, raising €20K more than the €80K goal. It entered early access in June 2019 and released on Windows on February 17, 2021. Forthright Entertainment published ports to the PlayStation 4, PlayStation 5, and Nintendo Switch on April 22, 2022.

== Reception ==
Shattered – Tale of the Forgotten King received mixed reviews on Metacritic. RPGFan said that despite Redlock's "care and hard work", the game is "frustrating, repetitive, and directionless". Jeuxvideo.com and 4Players gave it mostly positive reviews, though both criticized the combat.
