= Space Wreck =

2023 video game

- Original Steam header
- Developer: Pahris Entertainment
- Publisher: Pahris Entertainment
- Designers: Martins Ceplis; Ernests Kļaviņš
- Platform: Windows
- Release: October 10, 2023
- Genre: Role-playing
- Mode: Single-player

Space Wreck is a 2023 role-playing video game developed and published by Pahris Entertainment for Windows.

== Gameplay ==
Space Wreck is an isometric role-playing game set in the 22nd century after a post-apocalyptic event. The player character is a spaceship captain who is tasked to find a replacement for a damaged fuel chip on a nearby spacewreck. The player has the option to choose from pre-designed characters or to create a character from the ground up. The game has often been described as similar to Fallout (1997).

== Release ==
Space Wreck was developed by Pahris Entertainment, a two-person company based in Riga, Latvia. The game was originally released as a free browser game on March 31, 2018, titled Space Wreck: Random Encounter with Space Pirates, developed by Martins Ceplis also known as "kamazs". A remastered downloadable version was released in 2019 with redone art by Ernests Kļaviņš. The game was planned to be released in Steam early access in February 2020. A gameplay trailer for the Steam version was released in 2019. A demo version with an intro, a completable main quest, and endings, was released on February 5, 2021. A full early access version was released on December 5, 2022. The game was released out of early access on October 10, 2023.

== Reception ==
Ars Technica praised the open-ended game design and the game's sense of humor, the graphics were said to be "prankishly simple" and the combat "utilitarian". Polygon concluded: "It's a refreshing, tiny RPG that captures the joy of classic games in the genre, and I'm hooked." Satori called Ernests Kļaviņš' art design "visually engaging" and "memorable".

Space Wreck won the indie category at the 2022 Game Development World Championship. The game was the winner at the 2024 Latvian Game Awards.
