= Sovereign Syndicate =

2024 video game

- Developer: Crimson Herring Studios
- Publisher: Crimson Herring Studios
- Engine: Unity
- Platform: Windows
- Release: January 15, 2024
- Genre: Role-playing
- Mode: Single-player

Sovereign Syndicate is a 2024 role-playing video game developed and published by Crimson Herring Studios for Windows. A spin-off of the game, Hunter's Moon: A Sovereign Syndicate Adventure, was released on November 24, 2025.

== Gameplay ==
The game is set in Victorian era London with fantasy elements. The setting has been described as steampunk. The gameplay is said to be heavily influenced by Disco Elysium.

== Reception ==
Reception

Aggregate score
Aggregator	Score
Metacritic	77%

Review scores
Publication	Score
PC Gamer (US)	80%
Gry-Online	5.5/10
Oyungezer	7.5/10
PC Invasion	78%
RPGFan	76%

Sovereign Syndicate received "generally favorable" reviews from critics, according to the review aggregation website Metacritic. RPGFan noted, "Sovereign Syndicate is a game of highs and lows. If there is to be more to the story, the gameplay portion would need some rethinking to make it work. But on the positive side, I loved the world and characters, and I'd be excited to see more of them." PC Invasion praised the writing but felt the ending was rushed. PC Gamer said with its emphasis on roleplay rather than combat and borrowings from Disco Elysium, Sovereign Syndicate feels like another step forward for the CRPG. RPGamer said that the game "makes for a lovely take on the gaslamp fantasy genre, with the plot to back up the appearance." IGN complimented the worldbuilding and characters but criticized the writing, and called the game overall "a mixed bag".
