= The Stomping Land =

2014 video game

- Developer: SuperCrit
- Publisher: SuperCrit
- Engine: Unreal Development Kit
- Platform: Microsoft Windows
- Release: May 30, 2014
- Genres: Survival; Simulation
- Modes: Single-player; Multiplayer

The Stomping Land is a survival simulation video game released for Microsoft Windows. In the game, players take on the role of tribal hunters, and battle against each other and dinosaurs on an island. The game was primarily played through online multiplayer.

The Stomping Land was developed and published by SuperCrit, a group which included Alex Fundora. He conceived the game in 2013, and a Kickstarter campaign was launched later that year, seeking $20,000 to fund development. The campaign ultimately raised $114,000. The Stomping Land was released on May 30, 2014, as an Early Access game on Steam.

Reviewers were critical of the gameplay and noted a number of glitches. Regular updates were planned, with development expected to continue until the end of 2015. However, SuperCrit and Fundora stopped providing updates shortly after the release. An online petition was launched, seeking refunds and the game's removal from Steam. It was briefly removed in September 2014, but reinstated a month later following updates. A game modeler, one of the last remaining members of the development team, departed the project in January 2015. A month later, The Stomping Land was removed from Steam once again.

== Gameplay ==
The Stomping Land is a survival simulation game that was played primarily through online multiplayer. Each game server supported up to 16 players. The game also offers a solo mode, and can be played offline. The game is viewed from a third-person perspective, and is set in open environments depicting beaches and dense jungles. Gameplay switches between day and night. Players take on the role of tribal hunters who must survive on an island populated with dinosaurs. The animals can be tamed and ridden, or hunted for their meat. Players can either work alone or together as they try to survive. They can form their own tribal teams to defend their meat from rival players, and can also work together to steal meat from their rivals. Each player begins only with a hatchet as a weapon. Players can kidnap, imprison, and kill anyone who they consider a rival.

Trees and rocks serve as resources, as the player can turn them into wood and stone by hitting them with the hatchet. Players use these resources to craft new items such as a shield, a spear, or a bow with arrows. Other items include bolas, which can be used to tie up other humans. Resources can also be used to build a tipi, which serves as a respawn point; and a totem pole, which is used by players wishing to start their own tribe. A fire pit must be built to cook dinosaur meat, and is also created with resources. The player carries around a basket that is used to hold the resources, which are depleted entirely whenever an item is created.

Small dinosaurs and herbivores can be hunted alone and provide little nourishment, while tribal members work together to kill larger dinosaurs. Herbivores can be lured to carnivores, with players waiting to scavenge the leftover meat following the battle. Each dinosaur is represented by a star in the sky, which helps guide the player in the direction of that animal. Expertise points are required to tame a dinosaur. A point is awarded for each minute of gameplay, and a higher number of points allows the player to befriend larger dinosaurs. Herbs, collected around the island, also play a role in taming dinosaurs.

== Development and release ==
The Stomping Land was developed and published by SuperCrit, a group consisting of Alex Fundora, Lee Fisk, and Nick Pettit. Fundora had previously worked on the video game The Elder Scrolls V: Skyrim, receiving a "special thanks" credit. He also worked as a lead animator on Dungeon Defenders. Fundora was inspired to create The Stomping Land in early 2013, after he and Pettit played DayZ, a video game mod. The 1993 film Jurassic Park was also an inspiration. Fisk served in a public relations role for SuperCrit. A Kickstarter campaign was launched in May 2013, seeking $20,000 to fund development of the game. The campaign ultimately raised $114,000, and the game was created using Unreal Development Kit. Gameplay was considered a priority over dinosaur accuracy, and the developers sought to include dinosaurs not typically seen in media.

The Stomping Land was released for Microsoft Windows on May 30, 2014, as an Early Access game on Steam. SuperCrit acknowledged that the game was a work in progress, telling prospective buyers to wait on purchasing it if they wanted a "more finalized gameplay experience". Early game footage showed a large island that was absent from the Early Access release, which included a smaller island instead. New game features – including more weapons and items – would be added through updates later. The initial release included only six dinosaurs, although a total of 15 animals was planned for the final game. Dinosaur AI was in a very early state of development at the time of release.

Game updates were planned on a regular basis, with development expected to continue until the end of 2015. However, SuperCrit stopped providing weekly updates in June 2014. Later that month, Fundora cited personal matters as the reason for the lack of recent updates, and indicated that such issues had been resolved. Despite this, no further updates were provided, and players became concerned that the project had been abandoned. Fisk's contract had expired in May 2014, but he continued working as he wanted to see the game succeed. He eventually left SuperCrit in July 2014, feeling as if he was "stringing" the game community along. Fundora, explaining the absence of updates, announced in August 2014 that he was busy switching development over to Unreal Engine 4. Those who worked with Fundora said it was not uncommon for him to be unresponsive for prolonged periods of time.

At the time of Fundora's announcement, a Change.org petition had already been launched, seeking refunds and the game's removal from Steam. The petition received nearly 3,000 signatures. As of September 2, 2014, the game was no longer available for purchase on Steam. It was unclear if Fundora requested the removal, or if Steam pulled the game itself. The following month, Steam made the game available for purchase once again, after updates were made.

One of the game modelers departed the project in January 2015, due to lack of communication with Fundora, who still owed money for the modeler's services. The modeler was among the last members of the development team still working on the project. Gaming publications considered it abandoned at that point, although it still remained available for purchase as an Early Access game. It was removed from Steam at the end of February 2015. Financial backers demanded refunds, which were not covered by Kickstarter's policies. Instead, the company blocked Fundora from creating any future Kickstarter campaigns. Publications believed that The Stomping Land set a bad example for Kickstarter and Early Access projects, noting its negative publicity.

== Reception ==
The Stomping Land received criticism for a number of glitches, including poor AI and collision detection. Some critics considered the gameplay features to be minimal or lacking uniqueness. Others were dissatisfied with the crafting system and the complete depletion of resources upon the creation of each new item.

Cameron Woolsey of GameSpot found that the game quickly became boring, and wrote, "Peeling away the surface of this survival sim reveals mechanics that are either surprisingly limited in scope or otherwise broken or woefully incomplete". He questioned whether the game would ever be finished. Graham Smith, writing for Rock Paper Shotgun, was disappointed by the minimal number of online players and found much of the gameplay to consist of "aimless jogging". He concluded, "In its current state, The Stomping Land is a child's scrawl. I can see what it's trying to be and I want it to get there, but there's currently no single system in the game which is fun or even fully functional". Andrew Ross of Engadget considered the Early Access version very different from gameplay trailers released in 2013, stating that it "seems to have regressed". He wrote that the game "feels promising, but it also isn't done enough to justify a purchase".

In a listing of the 400 most popular Steam games of 2014, The Stomping Land ranked at 141, with 136,593 players and 139,298 owners.
