= Summerhouse (video game) =

2024 video game

- Developer: Friedemann Allmenröder
- Publisher: Future Friends Games
- Engine: Unity
- Platform: Windows
- Release: 8 March 2024
- Genre: City-building
- Mode: Single-player

Summerhouse is a 2024 sandbox city-building game developed by independent German developer Friedemann Allmenröder and published by Future Friends Games. The game allows players to construct towns and customise environments using building and decorative elements. The game features four environments, a day-night cycle, and unlockable features, such as object animations.

The game is Allmenröder's first solo release; he was inspired by games such as Townscaper, A Short Hike, and Stronghold: Crusader. Summerhouse received generally positive reviews from critics, with them praising the game's open-ended design, pace, and visual presentation, although some reviewers hoped for greater depth in the game's features and building elements.

== Gameplay ==
Players are given open-ended freedom to construct buildings across four environments with no objectives.

Summerhouse is an open-ended, cozy, city-building sandbox game where players build small towns without set objectives. Players can use the user interface to select building elements, such as blocks, doors, rooftops, windows, chimneys, trees, shrubs, and decorative features like letterboxes, placing them into the world. Four environments are provided, including a prairie, city, mountain, and desert. The game also has a day-night cycle and weather options. The depth of elements in relation to other objects can be adjusted, and a deletion tool assists in removing unwanted elements after they are placed.

Players can also scroll horizontally to pan across the environment. Summerhouse also features hidden secrets and unlockable features, including animations added to certain objects over time and special blocks that are unlocked when certain elements are placed into the environment. A fast-forward function lets player view the progress of their town's construction from the start of the game.

== Development and release ==
Summerhouse was developed by German independent developer Friedemann Allmenröder and published by Future Friends Games. It is Allmenröder's first solo release. The game was developed in the Unity game engine. Allmenröder described the game as a "love letter to the feeling of childhood summer holidays". While working on the game, he was inspired by games such as Townscaper, A Short Hike, and Stronghold: Crusader. An announcement trailer was released in December 2023 for the Steam Wholesome Snack Indie Game Showcase, and the game was launched on 8 March 2024. Before its release, a demo version of the game was available. The game is compatible with Steam Deck.

== Reception ==
Reception

Aggregate scores
Aggregator	Score
Metacritic	76/100
OpenCritic	57% recommend

Review scores
Publication	Score
Eurogamer	4/5
Hardcore Gamer	3/5
TouchArcade	4.5/5
Softpedia	4/5

Summerhouse received "generally favourable" reviews upon release, according to review aggregator website Metacritic. Fellow review aggregator OpenCritic assessed that the game received fair approval, being recommended by 57% of critics. The slow pace and open-ended approach to city-building were praised. Describing the game as "uniquely peaceful", Christian Donlan of Eurogamer found the game's simplicity to have a meditative quality. According to Siliconera's Jenni Lada, the game encouraged players "to live in the moment" and was a calm and passive experience. Thomas Kent of Hardcore Gamer commended the game's soundtrack. Cosmin Vasile of Softpedia praised the game's mechanics.

Critics generally lauded the game's visual presentation and building design. Donlan enjoyed the "endless variation" of items across different architectural styles. Describing Summerhouse's visuals as impressive, Kieron Verbrugge of Press Start acclaimed the "picturesque" environments and "enchanting" backdrops. Writing for Rock Paper Shotgun, Katharine Castle commended the looks of shadows and water. Mikhail Madnani of TouchArcade compared the game to Townscaper, describing its visuals as spectacular. Jasmine Gould-Wilson of GamesRadar+ found the unlockable animations created "small touches of surprise" that encouraged experimentation, with Verbrugge noting the inclusion of animated characters added an aspect of "emergent, personal storytelling" to the towns. Vasile praised the looks of the user interface.

However, some reviewers considered that the game could have featured greater depth. Kent felt that the lack of objectives left the game "too open-ended", leaving players feeling pointless. Reviewers expressed the desire for greater customisation options and tools, such as resizing elements. Vasile disliked that the game only had four environments. Several reviews also felt that the game could have used more pieces to construct buildings.
