= Street Hacker =

2004 video game

- Developer: VirtuWeb Interactive
- Publisher: VirtuWeb Interactive
- Designer: VirtuWeb Interactive
- Platform: Windows
- Release: February 13, 2004
- Genre: Simulation
- Mode: Single player

Street Hacker is a hacking simulator game developed by VirtuWeb Interactive. Unlike other hacking simulation games, the in-game engine is made to appear more like an actual computer system similar to the Linux OS/Shell.

== Plot ==
In Street Hacker, the player assumes the role of a hacker who is approached by a crude executive and entrepreneur, Demetrius Mordecai. He sees you as a person with a strong analytical mind, keen intuition and a desire for power. Having no money at your disposal, he hires you as a hacker to do his dirty work. Vince, his chief of operations, helps you get started and accustomed to the game. Being as successful as he is, Demetrius has made quite a few enemies in the corporate world. This is evident by the first few missions he assigns you to, missions in which you are required to disrupt these corporations by sabotaging their servers. Once these missions are completed, Demetrius decides to "retire" you by calling in an anonymous tip to the FBI about who was behind the attacks. Quickly responding, the FBI surrounds your apartment and finds enough evidence to put you away for 4 years.

Two years later, you are freed from prison to serve your remaining two years on parole. Vince, your mentor from the beginning, helps you get back on your feet by hooking you up with a laptop and some cash. He and many of the others who still work for Demetrius are all hoping that you can find enough dirt on him to put him away for life. Too afraid to directly betray him, they all put their support behind you.

== Style ==
Street Hacker focuses primarily on actual forms of hacking (viruses, worms, etc.). The user is given a program with which to order these different programs so that they can perform the various missions assigned to them. Another feature to the game is the infiltration feature, where the user is required to infiltrate a building in order to hack internet access so they can accomplish the different missions that are assigned to them. Similarly to games such as Uplink, Street Hacker is heavily mission-driven, the entire main storyline being propelled by the different missions assigned. For the most part, the in-game dynamics mimic that of an actual operating system (down to the ability to execute programs and view folders). Hacking takes place via command line, using commands familiar to computer aficionado (commands such as WHOIS, CONNECT, etc.). It also allows for downloading files from the respective servers which you must connect to for missions (and in some cases for software downloads).

== See also ==
- Hacking
- Uplink
- System 15000
- Hacker
- Neuromancer
