= SimPort =

SimPort-MV2
- Developer(s): Tygron, Port of Rotterdam, TU Delft
- Platform(s): Windows, Mac OS X
- Release: January 1, 2007
- Genre(s): Construction and Management Simulation, Serious games
- Mode(s): Single player, multiplayer

SimPort-MV2 is a computer-supported construction and management simulation game that mimics the processes involved in planning, equipping and exploiting the Second Maasvlakte (MV2) in the Port of Rotterdam. The Second Maasvlakte is a port expansion project to be situated on newly reclaimed land adjacent to the existing port area.

The simulation/serious game is primarily for staff of the Port of Rotterdam, but with its emphasis on strategy, project management and teamwork, it is appropriate for others as well, such as students and (young) professionals as part of their education or training courses. The game requires no specific prior knowledge of sea ports or of the Maasvlakte.

== A serious challenge ==
The object of the simulation is to build the Second Maasvlakte. Specifically, they must individually and collectively make the appropriate planning and implementation decisions to lead to a workable design and exploitation of the Second Maasvlakte over a 30-year period.

== Gameplay ==
The game is played in teams. Collectively, the game's management team (3-6 people) from the Port of Rotterdam possesses virtually all of the responsibilities and competencies to plan, coordinate and implement the decisions necessary to build, equip and exploit the MV2 in the coming years.

The management team works under the supervision of the General Director and is also made up of one or more directors from the Commercial Department and the Infrastructure and Management Department. Each of the three roles has the use of a laptop.

Players use the laptops to input their decisions into the game. Thus, two (or more) persons can play one role together, though this means they will use the same laptop. To make it easier to look up information during the game, each team is also given a reference document containing all of the customer and strategy information.

All decisions that are physically possible (in the simulation) and within legal and ethical boundaries are implemented immediately. Players wanting to confer with parties not actively represented in the game — for example, a minister — can direct their questions to the game leader who, if possible, will take on the role for a short time.

== Technical details ==
SimPort was developed from scratch in Java. All parameters are stored in XML files. The 3D environment is rendered using OpenGL, bound to Java using JMonkeyEngine.

SimPort currently only features the module "Maasvlakte 2", but due to the modular design it will also be possible to create new modules for new ports.
