= Sumerian Six =

2024 video game

- Developer: Artificer
- Publisher: Devolver Digital
- Director: Kacper Szymczak
- Producer: Sebastian Hitchinson
- Designer: Jan Rawski
- Programmer: Maciej Krasiński
- Artists: Grzegorz Przybyś; Krzysztof Lesiński
- Writers: Olga Ilukowicz; Alec Meer
- Composer: Jacek Paciorkowski
- Platform: Windows
- Release: WW: September 2, 2024
- Genres: Stealth, real-time tactics
- Mode: Single-player

Sumerian Six is a 2024 stealth-based real-time tactics video game developed by Artificer and published by Devolver Digital. Players must infiltrate a Nazi castle and stop a scientist from using a doomsday weapon during World War II.

== Gameplay ==
During the interwar period, a group of scientists discover a powerful substance, Geistoff, but one of their members, Hans Kammler, betrays them. In 1944, Sid Sterling attempts to rescue his sister, Isabella, from Kammler, who is now attempting to turn Geistoff into a doomsday weapon for the Nazis. Sumerian Six is a stealth-based real-time tactics game. Players must avoid detection by enemies, including cones that indicate line of sight; use the environment for cover; and hide corpses. Different missions can unlock playable characters, who have special abilities. For example, Isabella can briefly turn invisible, and Sid can possess enemies.

== Development ==
Artificer, a Polish studio, previously made Showgunners, a turn-based tactics game. In February 2024, Devolver Digital, their parent company, laid off 18 people at Artificer. Another 10 were planned to be laid off after development completed. Devolver released Sumerian Six for Windows on September 2, 2024.

== Reception ==
Sumerian Six received positive reviews on Metacritic. Eurogamer compared it to Shadow Tactics and Shadow Gambit. Though they said they encountered some bugs, they called it "an inventive, richly conceived take on the genre". Shacknews likened it to "Indiana Jones [gone] sci-fi" with copious violence. They found the start rocky, mostly with regard to what they felt was boring dialogue, but said that the tactical aspects were very fun, especially when levels afforded players creative freedom. These levels, according to Shacknews, raised it above a clone of its influences. Despite some issues with the controls on a preview release, Hardcore Gamer praised the gameplay and characters.
