= Star Trek: ConQuest Online =

2000 video game

- Developer: Genetic Anomalies
- Publisher: Activision
- Producer: Scott Kimball
- Designer: Anthony Shubert
- Programmers: Howie Brenner; Daniel Collins; Srinadha Godvarthy; Joe Hartford
- Artist: B. J. Johnson
- Series: Star Trek
- Platform: Microsoft Windows
- Release: NA: June 21, 2000; EU: June 30, 2000
- Genre: Digital collectible card game
- Mode: Multiplayer

Star Trek: ConQuest Online was an online digital collectible card game set in the Star Trek universe released in June 2000 for Microsoft Windows by Activision.

== Plot ==
Player assumes the role of a Q, an all-powerful being who is anxious to reign most clever amongst a bevy of other Qs. By utilizing collectible pieces from Star Trek: The Next Generation, the player manipulates the galaxy, hoping to outwit the competition and emerge victorious.

Player starts off with a predetermined set of pieces, constructed from a group of more than 150 characters, weapons, and ships, each with varying abilities and value. Player uses their pieces to gain control of the planets in their quadrant, as well as to attack and fend off their opponent's pieces. A player wins by seizing control of the challenger's home planet and capturing the Q or by holding off an opponent long enough to rack up the necessary points.

== Reception ==
Reception

Aggregate score
Aggregator	Score
Metacritic	63/100

Review scores
Publication	Score
Computer Games Strategy Plus	1.5/5
Computer Gaming World	1.5/5
GamePro	3.5/5
GameSpot	7.9/10
GameZone	7/10
IGN	7.8/10
PC Gamer (UK)	67%
PC Gamer (US)	35%

The game received "mixed or average" reviews according to the review aggregation website Metacritic.
