= Stairs (video game) =

2015 video game

- Developer: GreyLight Entertainment
- Publisher: Digital Tribe Games
- Platform: Microsoft Windows
- Release: 28 September 2015
- Genre: Survival horror game
- Mode: Single-player

Stairs is a psychological survival horror video game developed by GreyLight Entertainment and published by Digital Tribe Games. It was released on 28 September 2015 for Microsoft Windows.

Stairs is loosely based on the Donner Party.

== Gameplay ==
The game is played in first person. It makes the player use a camera (along with different sources of light) to navigate around environments and avoid obstacles. The player must use their camera to activate certain doors, interact with certain objects, or move around in certain places. There is also a list of places of interest at each location, which gives the player a rough depiction of their progress.

Although no weapons are used, the scarcity of enemies and lack of "boss" monsters motivate strategy over action. (The camera could be considered a "weapon" of sorts given the use and role it takes.)

Players may crouch to move through small tunnels, or under certain obstacles. This crouch mechanic can also be used if a player wishes to move slower to avoid detection by an enemy or other hazards.

== Synopsis ==
A journalist investigates the disappearances of three people near an old factory.

=== Setting ===
The majority of the game takes place in or around a disused building, presumed to be a factory. Underneath the building is a series of tunnels closely resembling mine shafts. Notes from various deceased people may be picked up and read at any time, some of which give clues as to the player's next goal.

The player may use their camera in certain areas to teleport to another, unspecified location, that bears some resemblance to the "decaying industry" motif that the factory used.

After reaching a point in the story, the player instead moves through an abandoned town. Here, three trials, which are located in fixed places on a map, must be completed to progress the game.

=== Plot ===
The main character, Christopher Adams, is a freelance journalist who, seeking a new story, investigates the three-year disappearances of three people. The three people are Valarie Burkley, James Reid, and Jon Remens. Adams has heard that Burkley was kidnapped by Reid and Remens, and is presumed dead. No motive is known for the kidnapping, the murder, or the three's sudden disappearance.

News of a strangulated female body, presumably Burkley, found inside a nearby factory was discovered by Adams, and he goes to investigate. He enters the factory to quickly find a large underground complex, where he meets Valarie Burkley, who is trapped in a locked room. Adams tries to find clues to discover the combination of a safe which holds the key to the locked room. Upon acquiring most of the clues, however, Valarie is seen hanged in the room, with the remainder of the combination on her clothing, and the wall behind her body. Throughout the rest of the complex, Valarie follows Adams, manipulating lights, and doors, and warning Adams about approaching danger.

Stairs leading down to the mine are found at the end of the complex. Within the mine, the player must activate two pumps and enter the pump control room to lower the water level sufficiently to reach an elevator and escape the factory. While doing so, the player comes into contact with humanoid beasts of unspecified origin, which have the potential to kill the player if alerted (such as by contact, loud noise, or by using the camera.) Valarie also attempts to impede the player's progress by patrolling the entrance to one of the pumps, though she can be avoided with relative ease.

After the water level lowers, the player finds more stairs which lead further into the mine, where the player must reach the elevator, dodging monsters, and collecting more information about the events leading up to the disappearances. The elevator eventually leads to the surface, after forcing the player to crawl through many corridors filled with subdued creatures.

Upon exiting the factory, the player traverses to the nearby town, where the voice of Jon Remens sounds over a speaker system. The player must complete three trials, each involving different elements of previous gameplay to be transported to a set of rooms resembling the mines. It is revealed that the residents of the town were involved in a mass suicide which was spurned on by Remens for unknown reasons.

These rooms are filled with the beasts from the factory (albeit in a more docile form), and feature Remens' voice addressing the player constantly. After these trials are over, the player travels through one more hallway which is very similar to those of the installation, at the end of which Remens accuses Adams of dehumanizing people and "making them into monsters." The beasts are most likely the dead residents of the town, in some form or another.

It is meant to be gathered that Valarie, as a mental patient, was being cared for by her father, though Adams corrupted that story by implying rape, incest, and other abuse by her father. Reid, meanwhile, was trapped in an underground mine with a group of fellow miners and they desperately searched for a way out to no avail. Adams twisted this by supposing that cannibalism also occurred during the escape attempt. Remens took a group of terminal cancer patients away into the woods to live off their days in peace apart from the rest of society. He then suggested suicide to the group as a means of dying on their terms, an idea which they adopted. Adams, however, called Remens a dangerous cult leader who forced his group into killing themselves.

Many clones of Valarie, all in different poses, surround the player at the end of the hallway, where a door can be found. Another set of stairs is found behind, and the game ends.

References to the Donner Party (specifically cannibalism) and Jonestown (with John Remens standing in for Jim Jones) are prevalent throughout the game.
