= Sinner: Sacrifice for Redemption =

2018 video game

- Developer: Dark Star
- Publisher: Another Indie
- Platforms: Windows, PlayStation 4, Nintendo Switch, Xbox One
- Release: October 18, 2018
- Genre: Action role-playing
- Mode: Single-player

Sinner: Sacrifice for Redemption is an action role-playing game developed by indie studio Dark Star and published by Another Indie. It was released on October 18, 2018, for Windows, PlayStation 4, Nintendo Switch and Xbox One. The game forces the player to fight bosses representing the seven deadly sins one after another, while removing one of the player's abilities for every fight. It received mixed reviews from critics, who cited its mechanics as a strong point but criticized its environments, music and story.

== Plot ==
The game's main character is a nameless wanderer who must fight the avatars of the seven deadly sins, each one representing something from their past.

== Gameplay ==
The game takes a boss rush format while being based on boss fights from the Dark Souls series. The player is given both melee and ranged weapons, as well as health potions, when starting the game. All the enemies have unique attack patterns. Once a boss is defeated, the player must sacrifice something, such as HP, weapon damage or resources. The game has seven bosses in total as well as an eighth final boss.

== Reception ==
Reception

Aggregate score
| Aggregator | Score |
|---|---|
| Metacritic | NS: 58/100; PC: 63/100; PS4: 57/100; XONE: 66/100 |

Sinner: Sacrifice for Redemption received an aggregate score of 63/100 on Metacritic for its Windows version, and 57/100, 58/100 and 66/100 for the PlayStation 4, Switch and Xbox One versions, respectively. Mike Epstein of IGN rated the game 6.3/10, calling it a game that "moves the Soulslike genre forward in some interesting ways", but saying that "it doesn't quite feel like a complete package", and that it lacks "narrative and aesthetic detail". Ginny Woo of GameSpot rated the game 6/10, saying that while ambitious, its aesthetics were not as strong as its mechanics, and it lacked character motivations while having performance issues on Switch. Jordan Helm of Hardcore Gamer rated the game 3/5, and stated that its core gameplay was "pleasing and genuinely tense", but also that it "falters from [...] a lack of context and general purpose", saying that it relied on "templates and tired tropes".
