= Summer Athletics =

2008 sport game

- Developer(s): 49Games
- Publisher(s): dtp entertainment
- Platform(s): Wii, Xbox 360, PlayStation 2, Microsoft Windows
- Release: NA: August 4, 2008; EU: August 15, 2008; AU: August 22, 2008
- Genre(s): Sports
- Mode(s): Single-player, Multiplayer

Summer Athletics, also known as Summer Athletics: The Ultimate Challenge on the Xbox 360, in North America, is a sports game, developed by 49Games and published by Digital Entertainment Pool for the PlayStation 2, Wii, Xbox 360 and PC. The game features 28 events, which includes swimming, diving, archery and track cycling, as well as athletics.

In the game, players can choose between two modes, the Arcade mode and the Realistic Mode, whereas players can choose difficulty from Amateur to Pro. Players may also have the opportunity to create, customize and name their own character and represent a country of their own.

== Events ==
- Track
  - 100 m
  - 200 m
  - 400 m
  - 800 m
  - 1500 m
  - 100 m hurdles
  - 110 m hurdles
  - 4x100 m relay
- Field
  - High Jump
  - Pole Vault
  - Long Jump
  - Triple Jump
  - Shot put
  - Discus throw
  - Hammer throw
  - Javelin throw
- Aquatics
  - 100 m freestyle
  - 100 m backstroke
  - 100 m breaststroke swimming
  - 100 m butterfly swimming
  - 4x100m relay
  - Diving
- Other
  - archery, compound and recurve
  - Cycling, team pursuit and team sprint

== Reception ==
The game received average reviews, with a Metacritic score of 71% for the PC version. PC Gamer UK called it "lightweight athletics fun", whereas PC Zone said it was "definitely fun, but it's also about as deep as a puddle". VideoGamer looked at the Wii version, which it praised for its excellent motion controls, but pointed out that some of the events are weak.
