= Solarix =

2015 video game

- Developer: Pulsetense Games
- Publisher: KISS Ltd
- Engine: Unreal Engine 3
- Platform: Windows
- Release: April 30, 2015
- Genres: First-person shooter, stealth
- Mode: Single-player

Solarix is a 2015 science fiction stealth-based first-person shooter survival horror video game developed by Pulsetense Games and published by KISS Ltd for Windows. It was developed using the Unreal Development Kit and is the first video game developed by the Turkish-based Pulsetense Games. The game is intended as a homage to stealth-focused first-person video games of the late 1990s and early 2000s, particularly System Shock 2 and the Thief series. It was released on April 30, 2015 on the Steam digital distribution service. It has received mixed reviews.

In Solarix, players take the role of engineer Walter Terrace, the sole civilian survivor of a viral infection that has wiped out a Solarix corporation space colony on the planet Ancyra. Walter must evade zombified colonists as well as hostile corporate mercenary soldiers, while following instructions provided by the colony's A.I. administrator, AMI, in an attempt to stop the infection.

In 2016 Pulsetense Games released De-Void, a narrative exploration game which serves as an "anti-sequel" to Solarix, which uses the same location and general setting, but has an entirely different plot which is deliberately not entirely consistent with the one presented in Solarix.

In 2017, Pulsetense Games released Planet Ancyra Chronicles, a compilation of Solarix and De-Void with the combat and enemies removed from the Solarix content. The game was made available for free to players who already owned either Solarix or De-Void.

In 2018, Pulsetense Games released ReFramed, a rebalanced version of Solarix using action-shooter FPS gameplay instead of the original game's stealth-based gameplay, which also removed the psychological elements of the game's plot.

== Gameplay ==
Solarix is a first-person video game with a strong emphasis on stealth. Enemies patrol each level and will react to the sound of footsteps as well as being more easily able to see the player when they are in lighted areas, encouraging players to move while crouched and remain in dark areas. Lights can be destroyed with weapons fire to create areas of darkness to sneak through. Enemies will also react to fresh bodies, which will trigger them into searching the area for the player, encouraging players to hide the bodies of killed enemies away from enemy patrol routes.

Enemies consist of both zombie colonists who will chase the player down and attack with melee attacks, as well as hostile mercenary soldiers armed with automatic rifles. Soldiers have better awareness and a longer sight range than zombies. Later levels taking place aboard a space station also introduce two different types of robots which are also armed with automatic weapons, as well as very durable, zombie-like cyborgs manufactured by Solarix for manual labor.

The player is equipped with a semi-silenced pistol, and can also obtain a shotgun much later in the game, however ammo is very rare and enemies become more resistant to damage once they become aware of the player, thus discouraging direct combat. The player is also given an electroshock stunner, a stealth weapon which has infinite ammo but only works with a close range (approximately 3–4 meters) jolt to the back of an unaware enemy's head. Players can also throw loose environmental objects to distract enemies or lead them to another location.

== Story ==
Solarix takes place in the year 2166 on humanity's first interstellar space colony, established on the planet Ancyra. An airborne viral infection has wiped out almost every human aboard the colony, transforming many of them into hostile zombie-like creatures referred to as "anomalies".

Walter Terrace, a civilian engineer and seemingly the sole civilian survivor of the colony, wakes up with no memory and is contacted by AMI, the Artificial Intelligence system controlling the colony, who enlists Walter's help in finding a way to stop the infection. Throughout his journey, Walter is also frequently contacted by Betty, a violent and unstable fellow survivor who often contacts Walter to alternatingly cajole, mock, and threaten him or otherwise comment on the situation. Besides Walter and Betty, the only human survivors on the colony are 50 corporate mercenaries under the command of Gregory Hart, a special representative recently sent by Solarix to provide oversight on the development of the colony. Hart's mercenaries are desperate and paranoid due to the situation and will shoot Walter on sight. Hart, who was already distrustful of AMI due to her status as an A.I., believes that AMI is responsible for creating the infection out of jealously against her human masters, and is therefore refusing to cooperate with AMI, forcing her to turn to Walter for help.

While traveling across the colony evading the mercenaries and the zombified colonists, Walter learns of the E.Y.E., an alien machine unearthed by the colonists more than two decades ago and installed aboard the colony's headquarters, the orbital space station ISS Megalodon, for research purposes. AMI believes the E.Y.E. is responsible for the infection, and sends Walter to gather data from the mine where the E.Y.E. was first discovered.

Walter then goes to the mercenary military base in an attempt to steal a space shuttle to travel to the space station, where AMI's computer core resides. However, he is captured by Hart's mercenaries and brought as a prisoner to the space station. After an undetermined period of time, Walter wakes up and escapes from his holding cell, only to find that Hart's remaining mercenaries have all been slaughtered, and the space station is now overrun with infected. The station's defense systems are also all hostile towards Walter.

After successfully remotely shutting down a supply shuttle that could have potentially transmitted the infection to Earth, Walter meets with AMI in the space station's main hub, who sends him to the station's Logistics section to run a diagnosis on the station's computer systems to determine what functions the E.Y.E. has taken control of. Walter does so, discovering that AMI and the E.Y.E. both control exactly the same functions, and therefore reaches the same conclusion that Gregory Hart had; that the E.Y.E. is simply a persona created by AMI to allow her to kill the human colonists.

Walter also learns that Betty is not actually a fellow survivor, but rather a voice in his head. During the initial journey to Ancyra decades ago, Walter suffered psychological damage while in stasis and became an unstable loner when the colony was first established. He murdered a fellow colonist, Betty, in a psychotic rage, and was put into indefinite stasis for his crimes. 20 years later, AMI awoke Walter from stasis out of desperation after the infection had killed off all the other colonists other than Hart and his men, albeit AMI itself was afraid of Walter.

Walter confronts AMI, who pleads with him, stating that she is not the E.Y.E., but rather the E.Y.E. has taken control of all her systems and is using them to destroy the colony. AMI asks Walter to shut her down, effectively killing her, then to upload a copy of her program directly into the E.Y.E. in order to destroy it from within. After shutting AMI down, Walter travels to the space station's research section to confront the E.Y.E.

Walter also confronts Gregory Hart, who succumbs to the zombie infection just as Walter reaches him, forcing Walter to kill him. Walter retrieves a serum to cure the infection that Hart had completed just prior to dying, only to learn the serum sample is too small to be used. The E.Y.E. mocks Walter for the futility of his actions, pointing out how foolish he was for having hope despite the heavily deteriorated condition of the space station. Walter shuts down the space station's engines to prevent the E.Y.E. from bringing the infection to Earth, then uploads a copy of AMI directly into the E.Y.E. in order to destroy it. The E.Y.E. continues to mock Walter, stating that it welcomes its death, as there are thousands of others just like it beneath Ancyra's surface, while it has succeeded in kill every human on the colony except Walter. The E.Y.E. dies laughing as it detonates the space station around itself and Walter.

Walter finds himself in outer space, clinging to the floating wreckage of the space station. Betty's voice echoes continuously in his head, urging him to kill himself. With nothing left to do, Walter hurls himself into space. The Planet Ancyra Chronicles version of Solarix ends with a text epilogue that states that Walter's body was found floating in space by the Solarix team sent to investigate the loss of communication from the colony, and reveals that Betty was Elizabeth Woolgather, the protagonist of De-Void.

== Reception ==
Solarix

Aggregate scores
Aggregator	Score
GameRankings	52.60%
Metacritic	54/100

Solarix has received mixed reviews. The game holds an aggregate score of 54 out of 100 on Metacritic, based on seven reviews, and 52.60% on GameRankings, based on five reviews.
