= The Spectrum Retreat =

2018 video game

- Developer: Dan Smith Studios
- Publisher: Ripstone Games
- Engine: Unity
- Platforms: PlayStation 4; Microsoft Windows; Xbox One; Nintendo Switch; Redux; Nintendo Switch 2
- Release: PlayStation 4; July 10, 2018; Windows, Xbox One; July 13, 2018; Nintendo Switch; September 13, 2018; Redux; Nintendo Switch 2; October 29, 2026
- Genre: Puzzle
- Mode: Single-player

The Spectrum Retreat is a 2018 video game for PlayStation 4, Microsoft Windows, Xbox One, and Nintendo Switch. It was developed by Dan Smith from the age of 15, over a five-year period. The game was made noteworthy by the young age at which Smith was able to develop the game and secure a publishing deal.

An updated version, named The Spectrum Retreat: Redux, is slated to release on October 29, 2026 for Nintendo Switch 2.

== Plot ==
Alex awakens in the Penrose hotel, finding it to be completely empty. With no memory of his arrival, and the hotel being run by few robotic assistants, he eventually finds a circular phone, connecting him to 'Cooper'. During breakfast, the world slowly begins to distort around him. Cooper contacts him soon afterwards, initially attempting to lead him to the rooftop, explaining that he is trapped within a simulation against his will. However, due to the system rejecting Alex's credentials, it is forced upon him to explore each individual floor of the hotel, where the main mechanics of the game and puzzle elements are found.

Throughout his exploration of the floors and its authentication protocols, he begins to remember events leading up to his "checking in" at the Penrose. Prior to the beginning of the game, his son, Robin, succumbed to an unknown illness. Due to changes in health care by Governor Crow, Alex and his wife Maddie ran up enormous medical bills, and despite numerous tests, Robin eventually died. In his grief, he proceeded to meticulously plan the murders of Matthews, the insurance underwriter who denied them coverage, Dr Wright, who failed to cure his son, and Governor Crow, who had radically changed medical care in the state. Maddie found out the plan after Alex murdered Matthews, forcibly committing him to the Penrose as both therapy and to protect him.

Alex eventually reaches the roof, meeting the AI manager who confides that this is not the first time that Alex has tried to check out, and implores him to stay, and pleads that he will change the simulation once more to better fit his needs. At this, the player has the option to either stay within the Penrose, much to Cooper's horror, or to finally leave the Penrose and accept his fate.

== Gameplay ==
The main mechanic of the game focuses around colours of blocks, swapping them around to bypass, or stand upon, different coloured gates. Eventually, the player is given the opportunity to use these colours to teleport around the levels using specifically placed panels. During these puzzles, snippets of the plot are revealed to the player. After the bulk of levels are completed, the player must sleep, listen to Cooper and piece together the story happening around them, and repeat the cycle.

== Reception ==
Reception

Aggregate score
| Aggregator | Score |
|---|---|
| Metacritic | PS4: 67/100; PC: 68/100; XONE: 69/100; NS: 78/100 |

An early version of the game was nominated for and won the BAFTA Young Game Designer Game Making Award (ages 15-18) in 2016 from the British Academy of Film and Television Arts.

Critically, the game was polarizing and was both praised and criticized for having two distinct art styles and gameplay sections.

It received favorable reviews from sites such as Gamereactor and Pass the Controller, giving it a 9/10 and 10/10 respectively. The game received "mixed or average reviews" on Metacritic.

The game was nominated for "Best Writing in a Video Game" at the Writers' Guild of Great Britain Awards.
