= The Serpent Rogue =

- Developer: Sengi Games
- Publisher: Team17
- Engine: Unity
- Platforms: Windows, PlayStation 5, Xbox Series X/S, Nintendo Switch
- Release: April 26, 2022
- Genres: Action-adventure, roguelike
- Mode: Single-player

The Serpent Rogue is a 2022 indie roguelike video game developed by Sengi Games and published by Team17. It was released on April 26, 2022, for Windows, PlayStation 5, Xbox Series X/S and Nintendo Switch, and is notable for having been completed by a Ukrainian studio during the 2022 Russian invasion of Ukraine. The game follows The Warden, a plague doctor and member of the Keepers, an elite group of alchemists who preserve the balance of the world and fight Corruption, an evil that can consume all living beings. The player must study their environment to create a wide array of potions, and battle enemies in real-time action combat. The game received mixed reviews from critics, who praised the game's aesthetic and crafting system, but criticized the combat and the game's lack of direction.

== Reception ==
Reception

Aggregate score
Aggregator	Score
Metacritic	72/100

Review score
Publication	Score
Eurogamer	6/10

The Serpent Rogue received an aggregate score of 72/100 for its Windows version, indicating "mixed or average reviews".

The Games Machine rated the game 7.2/10 points, praising the game as "great fun" when it runs smoothly, but extremely frustrating if the player cannot find a common ingredient. They called it dull if the player was not interested in crafting.

Eurogamer Italia rated the game 6/10 points, calling the game a work in progress from an inexperienced studio. They cited "dumbfounding" design decisions, like making the player unable to cut a rope with a sword or axe, only pieces of glass, and making the durability system so punishing that it is better to run away from the enemy than try to parry them. They praised the ideas and complexity of the game, but criticized the fact that none of them were adequately developed.
