= The Static Speaks My Name =

2015 video game

- Publisher: the whale husband
- Designer: Jesse Barksdale
- Composer: Shawn Claude Jones
- Engine: Unity
- Platforms: Microsoft Windows, OS X, Linux
- Release: 10 August 2015
- Genre: Adventure
- Mode: Single player

The Static Speaks My Name (stylized as the static speaks my name) is a video game released in 2015 by Jesse Barksdale under the name 'the whale husband' for Microsoft Windows, OS X and Linux. Described as a "dark, sad, weird and funny first-person exploration game (that) emphasizes mood and character over gameplay," the game is a horror-themed adventure game in which the player performs the last routines of a suicidal man obsessed with a painting. The Static Speaks My Name was praised by critics for its unique tone and unusual partnership of disturbing and absurd themes.

== Plot ==
The player assumes the role of Jacob Ernholtz, a man who the game informs the player has committed suicide by hanging at the age of 31, through entering an amorphous blob in a dark void. Ernholtz, now inhabited by the player in his last day alive, awakes in his dimly-lit apartment, which has its doors and windows boarded up, and performs a series of menial tasks, including using the restroom, eating breakfast, and chatting with friends on the internet. Exploring the apartment reveals that Ernholtz has developed an obsession with a painting of two palm trees and its painter, Jason Malone. Ernholtz uses a hidden doorway behind a bookcase to find Malone in a cage, and the player is given the option to either unlock the cage or electrocute Malone. The player is finally tasked to go to a small closet and commit suicide by hanging. The perspective then shifts back to the black space with multiple grey blobs, each with another person's name, age, and method of suicide.

== Gameplay ==
In-game screenshot

The Static Speaks My Name is played as a conventional adventure game in first-person perspective with player movement controlled by the mouse and keyboard, with limited interaction with objects, such as to obtain a key to open a door. The game provides the player with a series of objectives at the top left hand corner of the screen. Although the gameplay is linear, the player is provided with limited choices that turn out to be inconsequential, such as dialog options and choices relating to the man in the cage.

== Development ==
The Static Speaks My Name was originally developed by Jesse Barksdale as a game for the 48-hour Ludum Dare game jam in August 2014, for the prompt 'connected worlds'. In its original iteration, the player is placed in a room and commits suicide to turn into a ghost to float through the walls of the house. The motif of the palm tree painting is a satirical reference to the Ludum Dare version of the game, in which Barksdale repeatedly duplicated the image to quickly provide decoration to the interior of the house, receiving feedback that the painting should have carried a more significant meaning in the game. On 8 October 2019, Barksdale found a copy of the prototype, which had previously been lost, and uploaded it on his YouTube channel.

The final version of The Static Speaks My Name was developed in four months, with a greater emphasis on developing a narrative to the game. Barksdale stated his intention was "to create an experience with an emphasis on story, character and emotion" and to "create something that made you feel like you were someone else...to replicate that rawness that we all sometimes experience." Barksdale has expressed that the game's themes carries a personal meaning and draws from experiences of "depression and obsession", noting that "one of the points of the game is someone's search for meaning in something that is seemingly meaningless."

A follow-up to The Static Speaks My Name titled Bucket Detective, influenced by similar themes of "depression, anxiety and obsession", was released in February 2017.

== Reception ==
The Static Speaks My Name received positive reception from critics for its disturbing and humorous tone and the emotional impact of its subject matter. Patrick Klepek of Kotaku stated playing the game was "a total gut punch. I didn't have any words when the experience was over" Similarly, Joel Couture of Indie Game Magazine stated the game was an "emotional experience" and a "dark, bleak game." Writing for Rock Paper Shotgun, Konstantinos Dimopoulos stated the game conveyed an "intriguing and thoroughly upsetting story...via a series of increasingly disturbing objectives," stating "the game goes out of its way to stress you out and even make you feel guilty when smiling at its little jokes." Melody Lee for The Absolute praised the humour in the game, stating "Some scenes are blackly comedic, but even the bits that make you laugh at the absurdity contribute to the overall sense of unease that permeates the game."

Critics differed in their response to the representation of depression and suicide in the game, with some critics maintaining the game carried profound commentary. Writing for the Washington Post, Michael Thomsen stated the game was not about suicide and interpreted the game as a satire and deconstruction of "empathy games" such as Gone Home that "attempt to represent psychological or social conditions", stating the game is "a reminder of how absurd things can be when we confuse a desire to understand and appreciate other people’s life experiences by oversimplifying them in a form that reduces them to a series of inputs and outputs." Calling the title an "art game", Ted Hentschke of Dread Central stated the game was "incredibly powerful", praising its "minimalist style" and "surreal narrative" in "forsaking both mundane reality and hyperbolic hyper-reality for a middle ground that both embodies depression/obsession and enhances it for artistic effect. It is both purposed and vague." Ryan Hamann of Cane and Rinse praised the "dissonance" inherent in the gameplay, stating "The player feels trapped in a mind that he or she finds completely alien and inhospitable. The profound truth of the game is that it is likely that Jacob feels exactly the same way."

In contrast, other critics viewed the game's message as superficial. Writing for Game Critics, Mike Suskie found the game's representation of mental health and suicide to be "impenetrable", stating "without really learning anything about this person's history or how they came to be this way, Static trivializes much of what makes this such a complex issue." In a second opinion for the site, Tera Kirk agreed the game "leaves a lot to be desired...the actual story is weak and could go much further", but was "impressed that the game is able to convey depression's avolition in only ten minutes", citing the monotony of the daily routines in the game. Pixel Poppers stated the game was "brief and fairly pointless...the game doesn't really seem to be saying anything - it's just putting you in a disturbing situation for the sake of doing so, and not a particularly realistic one."
