= Stygian: Reign of the Old Ones =

- Developer: Cultic Games
- Publisher: 1C Entertainment
- Platforms: Linux; macOS; Windows
- Release: WW: September 26, 2019
- Genre: Tactical role-playing
- Mode: Single-player

Stygian: Reign of the Old Ones is a tactical role playing video game developed by Cultic Games. 1C Entertainment published it for PCs in 2019. It takes place in a Lovecraftian setting.

== Gameplay ==
In the 1920s, Arkham is transported to an otherworldly location amid the awakening of Cthulhu Mythos deities. In the resulting chaos, organized crime seizes power in the town, a powerful cult dedicated to the Cthulhu Mythos rises, and many of Arkham's inhabitants go insane. Players control a resident who attempts to find answers, following hints left by a figured called the Dismal Man. They can create their own character or use a pre-made character. Backgrounds include Lovecraftian archetypes, such as occultists, scholars, and criminals. Choices players make during character generation affect dialogue and gameplay options. Additional characters can be recruited from among the villagers and Lovecraftian fantasy races.

Players must manage their characters' emotional and mental stability. Sanity is measured like hit points and can be recovered through various actions, including resting, solving quests, and role-playing. For example, a humanitarian can recover sanity by acting according to their principles and helping others. Angst, which builds up over time due to stressful situations, applies various penalties to characters and changes dialogue options. Running out of sanity ends the game.

Combat is turn-based and tactical and uses a hex grid. Characters suffering from low sanity or angst-related penalties can perform worse in combat, and engaging in combat can raise characters' angst levels. Fighting some creatures can also cause sanity loss. Combats do not have to be fought to the death; players are allowed to exit combat once they have weakened the other side significantly, though they give up some loot.

== Development ==
Developer Cultic Games modeled the gameplay after their favorite role-playing video games, including Fallout, Baldur's Gate, and Planescape Torment. The combat was inspired by Fallout and Heroes of Might and Magic III. Cultic Games successfully funded Stygian: Reign of the Old Ones via Kickstarter in 2016, and 1C Entertainment released the game for Windows, macOS, and Linux on September 26, 2019.

== Reception ==
Stygian: Reign of the Old Ones received positive reviews on Metacritic. RPGamer praised the game's writing, role-playing potential, and complexity, but they criticized the combat, having to manage multiple health scores, and the ending, which they said "feels incredibly rushed". Rock Paper Shotgun praised the game's focus on role-playing and its depiction of Lovecraftian horror. Bloody Disgusting called the combat a poorly-explained chore, but they recommended it to fans of atmospheric and slow-paced role-playing games.
