= Slipways (video game) =

2021 video game

- Developer(s): Beetlewing
- Publisher(s): Beetlewing
- Designer(s): Jakub Wasilewski
- Programmer(s): Jakub Wasilewski
- Artist(s): Johan Törnlund
- Composer(s): Chris Donnelly
- Platform(s): Microsoft Windows, macOS
- Release: WW: June 4, 2021
- Genre(s): Puzzle, strategy
- Mode(s): Single-player

Slipways is a video game developed by Beetlewing. It combines gameplay from puzzle games and grand strategy wargames, though it streamlines out war and other features that involve micromanagement.

== Gameplay ==
Slipways incorporates gameplay inspired by turn-based grand strategy wargames, though it lacks a mechanic for war. Players focus on resource management and graph optimization to grow their space empire. The galaxy is procedurally generated, and different alien races assist in each playable sector. Each alien race has their own priorities, such as performing research or establishing new colonies, and will reward players for accomplishing tasks related to their priorities.

As new worlds are discovered and colonized, they must be efficiently integrated into the empire's trade routes. Each planet can be colonized in different ways to give it different desired imports and exports. Labor not exported cause unemployment, and resources not imported cause resource shortages. Researching new technologies allow new colonization options, structures, and planet projects, and other methods to create and satisfy desires.

If the empire's populace become too unhappy or the player runs out of money, the game ends. In a standard game, players try for a high score by the final turn, or on weekly ranked runs can compete globally for high scores. Alternatively, a sandbox mode allows endless building, and a campaign mode offers more challenging puzzles.

== Development ==
Slipways was created by Jakub Wasilewski. He originally implemented a prototype of the game on the PICO-8, a virtual machine in the style of a game console, using a pay what you want model. The mainline version is implemented in Unity. Wasilewski wanted to streamline out the parts of strategy games that he found to be busy-work or excessive micromanagement. Instead of managing individual planets, Wasilewski focused on the logistics of an empire. War slowed these games down too much, so he completely removed it. He was also interested in an empire-building game that did not depict war as unavoidable. When Wasilewski polled the PICO-8 players, he found they did not consider war to be a priority feature, so he stuck to the original design when developing the commercial game. The game was released June 4, 2021.

== Reception ==
Reviewing a pre-release version of the game, Andy Kelly of PC Gamer wrote, "It's a wonderfully simple, streamlined strategy game, but still makes you feel like you're building something grand." Nic Reuben of Rock Paper Shotgun described Slipways as "a phenomenally smart piece of design" that pits players against their own poor impulses instead of AI-controlled players. Rock Paper Shotgun subsequently listed it among the best space games for the PC, best PC strategy games, and the best games released in 2021. Writing for Wireframe Magazine, Ian Dransfield called it "a focused, delightful puzzle game masquerading as space empire-based grand strategy."
