= Star Trek: Starship Creator =

1998 vehicle simulation video game

- Developer: Imergy
- Publisher: Simon & Schuster
- Platforms: Windows 95-XP & Mac OS 7.5–9
- Release: October 29, 1998
- Genre: Vehicle simulation game
- Mode: Single player

Star Trek: Starship Creator is a computer-based vehicle simulation game developed by Imergy and released by Simon & Schuster Interactive in 1998 for both Microsoft Windows and Mac OS, based on the official license of the Star Trek franchise. Elements in the game were created in conjunction with the technical advisers for the series and films, such as Mike and Denise Okuda. The gameplay in Starship Creator allowed for the player to equip and crew a series of different starship classes from across the Star Trek universe, including those from both the various series and the film series. An expanded version was subsequently released as Star Trek: Starship Creator Deluxe in late 1999 which added further starships, missions and customization. The official website also contained downloads for the characters from the Star Trek: New Frontier series of books. Reception by critics for Starship Creator was negative, with criticism directed at the gameplay and graphics, and the suggestion was made that the game would only appeal to Star Trek fans. A sequel followed in 2000 entitled Star Trek: Starship Creator Warp II.

== Gameplay ==
The game style of Star Trek: Starship Creator allows for players to create their own starships, equipping it with technology from the Star Trek universe. This includes elements such as warp drive, space probes as well as weapons such as phasers and photon torpedoes. The player also selects the crew that man the starship; these are pulled from across the franchise, and includes characters such as Spock, James T. Kirk and Worf. Some of the characters, such as Rachel Garrett from "Yesterday's Enterprise", had their biographies expanded for the game. This biography was specifically taken into account and expanded upon by Robert Greenberger in the book Star Trek: Enterprise Logs.

There is also the ability to import photos into the game to create new characters, as well as writing the related biographies. This was intended so that players could include themselves on the crew. The equipped starships are then sent out on missions which earn credits that can then be used to buy new equipment or crew for the ship, or purchase a new starship and begin once again. The game includes the option to run in background mode, so that missions can be undertaken while the user conducts other tasks on their computer. This was described as "stealth mode" in official descriptions of the game.

The starships featured in the game are a cross section from all of the television series seen so far. The Constitution class appears from Star Trek: The Original Series, while the Galaxy class seen in Star Trek: The Next Generation is also present. The Defiant and Intrepid classes appear, having been in Star Trek: Deep Space Nine and Star Trek: Voyager respectively. Also in the game is the Miranda class, which first appeared it in Star Trek II: The Wrath of Khan, and the Sovereign class which was introduced in Star Trek: First Contact.

== Production ==
Starship Creator was developed by Imergy. It had previously created other multimedia software products based on the Star Trek licence, including the Star Trek: The Next Generation Interactive Technical Manual. It was published by Simon & Schuster Interactive. Starship Creator was designed with input from Michael Okuda, Denise Okuda, Rick Sternbach, and Doug Drexler, who were responsible for many of the technical aspects of the television series seen up until the release of the game. Writers such as David Alan Mack were responsible for the creation of the missions seen in the game.

== Reception ==
James Lileks reviewed the original release of the game for the Star Tribune. He criticised the lack of end product to the game, in that there was no point at which it was completed. He described it as "It's just a thing to goof around with, if you're so inclined and have no life." The German magazine GameStar gave Starship Creator a rating of 30%, calling it an "idiosyncratic piece of software" that would irritate gamers, and is only of interest to Star Trek fans who want to debate the differences between starship classes. PC Games, another German magazine, gave the game a score of 27%, saying that it was a good idea overall but the graphics execution and unimaginative gameplay resulted in a poor game. The review in Macworld gave the game a rating of three out of five and criticised the lack of gameplay once a mission was launched, describing the player as a "mere spectator".

Scott Udell of Computer Games Magazine gave a score of three out of five for the Deluxe version and said that "Despite the clunkiness of its software technology, Starship Creator is still a lot of fun, although probably only for those really into Treknology". Joseph Szadkowski reviewed the Deluxe version of the game in February 2000 for The Washington Times. He said that while he enjoyed the experience on "some weird level" as he "really enjoyed taking a back seat and watching scenarios unfold", but suggested that it would have been far more popular with improved graphics and a greater emphasis on action. Boys' Life described the game as "Everything non-Trekkies never really wanted to know about 'Star Trek'. For die-hard fans only."

== Deluxe version and sequel ==
The game was re-released as a "Deluxe" version in late 1999. This added three new ship classes, the Akira, the Oberth and the Prometheus class. It also included seven new missions, as well as the ability to send two ships on a mission at the same time. It also added the ability to customise the registry numbers on the starships created by the user. The official website also contained the downloads to add the main characters from the Star Trek: New Frontier series of books to the game.

The following year, Simon & Schuster released a sequel entitled Star Trek: Starship Creator Warp II. The sequel added some new classes of buildable starships and was backwards compatible, which allowed for importing of starships created in the original Starship Creator, as well as exporting vessels to the multi-player mode of the 2001 game Star Trek: Deep Space Nine: Dominion Wars. Because of this function, the sequel was often packaged with Dominion Wars.
