= Sir, You Are Being Hunted =

2014 video game

- Developer: Big Robot
- Designer: Jim Rossignol
- Engine: Unity
- Platforms: Microsoft Windows, Mac OS X, Linux
- Release: 1 May 2014
- Genres: Survival horror, stealth
- Modes: Single-player, multiplayer

Sir, You Are Being Hunted (alternatively titled Madam, You Are Being Hunted) is an open world survival horror stealth video game developed by Big Robot for Microsoft Windows, macOS, and Linux. An alpha version of the game was made available on 19 August 2013.

After years without updates, in September 2021 the game was updated to version 1.5 by the external Dutch game development studio Den of Thieves Games. Alongside the update, a remastered "Reinvented Edition" was announced, with developers announcing that the remastered version of the game would be released on the Nintendo Switch. As of 2025, Reinvented Edition has not been released.

== Gameplay ==
The player hides from robots patrolling a town, watching them from afar using binoculars.

In Sir, You Are Being Hunted, players have to survive from 'Hunters' (robots dressed as Victorian gentlemen) who are trying to track down and kill them, whilst attempting to escape from an island. Players are required to scavenge towns and villages for items such as food and weapons to help them survive while collecting parts of an exploded machine in order to escape the island. If the robots find a part, they set up sentries around it to defend it from the player. The game's enemies utilise dogs and balloons in order to find the player.

The island played on is procedurally generated, meaning that every playthrough will generate a different landscape. It is populated with villages, towns and other areas where the player can find essential supplies.

== Robots ==
As of "The February update", nine AI robot models are in-game: upper-class Hunter, middle-class Squire, lower-class Poacher, along with the Dogs, Scarecrows, Bog Monster, Balloons, Riders, mechanical-horse riding fox-hunters, and the Landowner, a huge, aristocratic robot.

== Development ==
After Sir, You Are Being Hunted had been in development for six months, a Kickstarter campaign was launched in November 2012 to crowd fund the game, with a £40,000 goal. Funding ended in December, with a total of £92,551 raised towards game development. This amount fell short of the £100,000 that would allow character creation and customization, but Big Robot stated that they would "endeavour to get some aspects of it into the game."

Big Robot founder Jim Rossignol said that the development team wanted to make a game that was "desperate and scary, but without being straight-faced," and "kitschy but with a genuine underlying threat." Jim stated that the team "had a vision to take what was kind of bleak and frightening about the British landscape and put it into a game", going on to say that they had focused heavily on audio in the game, describing it as "one of those differences that people won't really notice explicitly while they are playing but they will get a lot back from it."

In May 2013 new gameplay videos showcased mountain biomes which had recently been added. These biomes are remote mountainous and rocky areas away from lootable buildings.

On 1 September 2021, Big Robot announced they had been collaborating with Dutch game development studio Den of Thieves Games B.V. to update Sir, You Are Being Hunted to version 1.5 bringing various bug fixes, engine upgrades, and a revival of the multiplayer mode which until that point had been broken.

== Marketing and release ==
In April 2013, two gameplay videos were released, showing a developer playing an early version of the game.

Kickstarter backers were allowed to play an alpha version of the game before the full release, with it being reported that around 900 players had early access.

On 19 August 2013, the alpha version was made available for Kickstarter backers and purchase through Steam or the Humble Store.

On 1 May 2014, chap hop artist Professor Elemental released the song "Being Hunted" as a cross-promotion coinciding with the game's release.

== Reception ==
Reception

Aggregate score
Aggregator	Score
Metacritic	63/100

Review scores
Publication	Score
4Players	49%
Destructoid	7/10
Edge	6/10
Eurogamer	7/10
GamesMaster	72%
GameSpot	4/10
GamesTM	4/10
IGN	7.7/10
PC Gamer (UK)	63%
PCGamesN	7/10
Metro	6/10

The game received "mixed" reviews according to the review aggregation website Metacritic.
