= Superball Arcade =

2003 video game

- Developer(s): Cheeky Monkey
- Publisher(s): Cheeky Monkey
- Designer(s): Felix Leung
- Platform(s): Windows
- Release: May 29, 2003
- Genre(s): Breakout
- Mode(s): Single-player

Superball Arcade is an Arkanoid-like video game for Microsoft Windows released as shareware on May 29, 2003 by Canadian developer Cheeky Monkey Software. It is a sequel to the 2002 game Atomic Superball: The Chicken Edition.

== Gameplay ==
The game is a mix of several arcade game styles, such as Breakout; Arkanoid and Asteroids, as well as pinball gameplay and boss battles. In the Breakout sections, players control a paddle and must prevent a ball from touching the bottom of the screen by bouncing it back up the screen. The play area contains rows of bricks which must be destroyed by bouncing the ball against them. Destroying bricks releases power-ups and prizes, which can be collected. If the paddle is hit by enemies or weapons fire it begins to overheat, forcing the player to vent it and release heat, in turn preventing the paddle from being moved for a short period.

The game is known for its odd humor, featuring cows and wolves falling from the top of the screen, monkeys being fired from a barrel and dogs flying across the screen destroying bricks in their path.

== Reception ==
Superball Arcade received a 5-star Editor's rating from Download.com.
