= Ski Resort Tycoon =

2000 video game

- Developer(s): Cat Daddy Games
- Publisher(s): Activision Value
- Platform(s): Windows
- Release: 2000
- Genre(s): Business simulation game
- Mode(s): Single player

Ski Resort Tycoon is a business simulation game in which the player must successfully create and run a ski resort. The player is able to add a variety of structures including ski lifts, hotels, trinket shops, bars and other various accommodations. The game features sandbox modes as well as pre-defined challenges. The game is entirely 3D, utilizing accelerated and software rendered models. A Yeti can also be seen in the game, and it can be found eating the guests.

A sequel, Ski Resort Tycoon II, was released in 2001.
