= Silver Knights (video game) =

2002 video game

- Developer: Haruo Teshima
- Designer: Moon (alias)
- Engine: Proprietary
- Platform: Microsoft Windows
- Release: December 12, 2002 (original); April 1, 2008 (milestone); April 6, 2010 (pre-alpha)
- Genres: Action, fighting, mech
- Modes: Single-player, multiplayer

Silver Knights is a homemade 3D mech action/fighting Dojin soft game created by Haruo Teshima. The game is popular in Japan and Hong Kong, and has a small following in the United States. The development of this game was temporarily stopped at milestone version 0.05D, but production of new pre-alpha builds started again in January 2007. The latest stable version of the game features over 10 different mechs, but newer versions feature only the current mech being worked on, in contrast to past comprehensive updates. The latest version is 0.13K.

== History ==
Early versions of the game featured only a handful of short, primitive mechs, and were full of bugs and instability. Philotes, Cerberus, Tartaros, and Icarus became the primary mechs of the game. These were to be the focus of the game's undeveloped Story mode. Teshima instead focused on adding new mechs and bugfixes. The game developed and evolved over time to a more realistic graphical style. In late 2004, after a period of scarce updates, Haruo Teshima announced a temporary hiatus in development. Development continued briefly in 2007 before Teshima announced another year of hiatus to focus on a new project called Gunners. The development of this game was short lived, however, and in 2008 Silver Knights production was started up again, but once again halted. In 2009, the production began once again to release newer mechas as well as some redesigned mechas. The most current version released is 0.13K.

== Gameplay ==
The gameplay is relatively similar to the Virtual-On arcade game, in a team deathmatch style of shooter/fighter. The player is pitted against other mechs in a three-dimensional environment. The game can hold up to six players at a time, including both computer-controlled characters and player characters. The game's controls make use of the keyboard, except during "Simple Wars" which requires the use of both the keyboard and mouse.

== Network play ==
Silver Knights has developed a cult following online. Silver Knights uses DirectPlay as network method. Fan-based websites have developed a player-supported community. Network play typically requires additional technical setup. Support pages are available from the developer to instruct new users, but such pages only instruct according to specific routers and firewalls in Japanese. Therefore, for users who do not speak Japanese, setting up a router can be difficult. Many users elect to utilize Hamachi, a freeware VPN client, to directly connect to other players, but players not utilizing Hamachi cannot connect to Hamachi-enabled host, and vice versa. Recently players use Comodo Easy VPN as an alternative to Hamachi, which is unlimited in network size unlike the former.
