= Shadow Master =

1997 video game

- North American PlayStation box art
- Developer: HammerHead
- Publisher: Psygnosis
- Platforms: PlayStation, Windows
- Release: PlayStation: NA: 15 December 1997; EU: 15 January 1998; Windows: NA: 25 March 1998; EU: 1998
- Genre: First-person shooter
- Modes: Single-player, multiplayer

Shadow Master is a 1997 first-person shooter video game developed by HammerHead and published by Psygnosis for the PlayStation and Microsoft Windows. It met with predominantly negative reviews, which praised its visuals but criticized it for clunky controls and poorly designed, frustrating gameplay.

== Gameplay ==
Shadow Master gameplay. The game is a first person shooter, with multiple on screen enemies and extensive HUD information.

Shadow Master is a first-person shooter, set in a science fiction universe. The player takes control of a futuristic and heavily armed ATV to traverse each level, combat aliens, and complete level objectives. Before each mission, the player is briefed by 'strategic command' on their mission objectives. The player is then brought into the level, which they can explore. The vehicle the player uses is controlled with either the D-Pad and shoulder buttons, or the two analog sticks in the PlayStation version. In the PC version, the mouse and keyboard or joystick can be used for movement. The player's vehicle has a certain amount of health and shields. If these drop below zero, a game over results. A radar is displayed to show the relative positions of enemies to the player character. The vehicle is also armed with many weapons, such as lasers, cannons, machine guns, missiles, grenade launchers and rail guns. Some have unlimited ammunition but are limited by an overheat meter which prevents constant use of the weapon, while others have a limited supply of ammunition but are much more effective and not limited by overheating.

The game contains sixteen levels spread across seven different worlds to explore. The levels are completed when all objectives in the current mission have been completed. Each level comes with its own complement of enemies, with many of them resembling creatures from Earth such as apes or wasps, but are mechanoid instead of living organisms. There are also many alien creatures to contend with as well, with some henchmen being made in the image of the Shadow Master himself. The creatures drop items the player can use when they are destroyed, such as health crystals, ammunition, weapons, power-ups and upgrades. These dropped items stay active for a short period and disappear if not picked up.

The PC version of Shadow Master also includes multiplayer support, using both IPX and serial connection.

== Development ==
Shadow Master was developed by Hammerhead, a newly formed company founded by Chris Stanforth, formerly of Traveller's Tales. The visual design concepts for the game were done by Rodney Matthews. The game was showcased at E3 1997 before being released later that year.

== Reception ==
Reception

Aggregate score
Aggregator	Score
GameRankings	66% (PS)

Review scores
Publication	Score
AllGame	2/5 (PS)
Computer Games Strategy Plus	2/5 (PC)
Computer Gaming World	2/5 (PC)
Electronic Gaming Monthly	5.125/10 (PS)
Game Informer	7/10 (PS)
GameFan	84% (PS)
GameRevolution	B+ (PS)
GameSpot	4.7/10 (PC); 7.2/10 (PS)
IGN	4/10 (PS)
Next Generation	1/5 (PS)
Official U.S. PlayStation Magazine	4/5 (PS)
PC Gamer (US)	47% (PC)

Shadow Master received mostly negative reviews. Critics unanimously praised the game's visuals for their cutting edge effects and imaginative design, but most found its gameplay severely lacking. Crispin Boyer of Electronic Gaming Monthly (EGM) summed up his assessment in simple terms: "Shadow Master looks good, sounds good, plays horribly." One of the most common particular criticisms was that the combination of a vehicle-bound player character with first-person perspective results in odd and often clunky controls, and the vehicle frequently gets stuck. IGN stated that "weapon control is unclear, and piloting your vehicle is ugly. If that's not disheartening, try aiming at a gun turret behind a wall and getting stuck in a corner." Kelly Rickards of EGM added that "the futuristic buggy-vehicle bounds around so much, it's a challenge just to shoot a simple enemy, let alone drive in a straight line."

Critics also expressed frustration with the lack of a map system, unintelligent level design, and the long stretches between save points. The more mixed reviews still acknowledged the game's high level of frustration while arguing that it also has rewards. GamePro, for example, commented that the "lightning-fast gameplay ... actually becomes annoying at times—as you blaze around a corner, you'll slide right into monsters. But with strategic puzzle elements, like timed switches and sequential triggers (where you have to press each trigger in a pattern), the game has some lasting power." GameSpot commented, "Hackneyed plot aside (an extreme evil has used up all of its planet's natural resources and is coming to - gasp - take ours), this game is actually pretty decent for a 3D shooter. The game combines intense graphics with an incredibly huge volume of enemies ... [and the] landscapes and creatures differ from anything you've seen before."

Citing the issues with the controls, linear level designs, and save system, Computer Gaming World summed up that "Shadow Master is a game that focuses too much on art and sacrifices gameplay." IGN and Next Generation both concluded, "Everything about Shadow Master screams 'second rate'. Pass on it and wait for the Psygnosis 'A' team to publish its next title." GameSpot's review for the PC version cited issues with the multiplayer portion, noting that "Gameplay seems to slow down to the speed of the slowest machine on the network, which is a phenomenon I haven't encountered in quite a while. Our Righteous 3D machine chugged along at an unplayable pace, even with low-resolution, flat-shaded graphics enabled. The Obsidian system ran just as slowly, which made the two-player session boring, frustrating, and as far from fun as possible."

The PlayStation version held a 66% on the review aggregation website GameRankings based on five reviews.
