= Ski Resort Tycoon II =

2000 video game

- Developer: Cat Daddy Games
- Publisher: Activision Value
- Platform: Windows
- Release: NA: October 8, 2001
- Genre: Business simulation
- Mode: Single player

Ski Resort Tycoon II is a business simulation game in which the player must successfully create and run a ski resort. This is the second game in a series. The first, Ski Resort Tycoon was released a year earlier in Fall/Winter 2000.
