= Jim Mackonochie =

Royal Navy engineer and officer (died 2013)

- Died: 23 April 2013
- Occupations: Video game designer, officer
- Known for: Mirrorsoft
- Notable work: Falcon, Su-27 Flanker, Lock On: Modern Air Combat, Digital Combat Simulator

Jim Mackonochie (died 23 April 2013) was a British Royal Navy officer who became a leading figure in the development of combat flight simulation video games.

Mackonochie was a Second lieutenant in the Royal Navy, deployed in the Persian Gulf, but never saw combat action.

He founded the game publisher Mirrorsoft in 1982. At The Fighter Collection and Eagle Dynamics, he was instrumental in the development of Falcon (1984 and later), Su-27 Flanker (1995), Lock On: Modern Air Combat (2003), Digital Combat Simulator (2008) and other games.
