= The Horsemen Aerobatic Team =

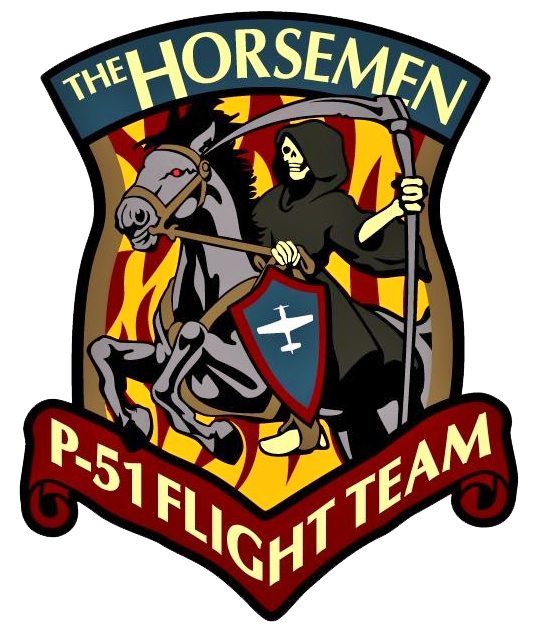
- The Horsemen logo
- Active: 1994
- Country: United States
- Role: Aerobatic flight display team
- Size: 5 Aircraft

Aircraft flown
- Fighter: P-51 Mustang, P-38 Lightning, F4U Corsair, F8F Bearcat, and F-86 Sabre

The Horsemen Aerobatic Team is the world's only P-51 Mustang, P-38 Lightning, F4U Corsair, F8F Bearcat, and F-86 Sabre formation aerobatic team, composed of three warbird pilots. The mission of The Horsemen is to "bring greater interest to the world of historic aviation and to remind future generations of how these powerful machines helped the Allies change the outcome of World War II, the Korean War, and the Vietnam War."

== Air show overview ==
Similar to other professional flying groups, The Horsemen's schedule runs each year from mid-March until early November utilizing both military and civilian airfields. They participate in events within the US as well as in Canada and Europe, usually participating in ten shows per season. Between June 16-18, 2023 the Horsemen Flight Team performed in an air show at Pratica di Mare military airport outside Rome to commemorate the 100th anniversary of the Italian Air Force. The team also performed at the Flying Legends Airshow at Leeds East Airport in the United Kingdom July 15-16, 2023.

== Squadron nickname, insignia and paint scheme ==
Since their formation in 1994, The Horsemen have utilized the insignia of the grim reaper on a horse bearing a shield with an emblem of the P-51 on the front of it. Since the addition of Steve Hinton to the team, the logo has also been altered to have the emblem of the F-86. The imagery is meant to represent the Four Horsemen of the Apocalypse, though Ed Shipley is quoted as saying that the name was inspired by a Metallica song.

== Current aircraft ==
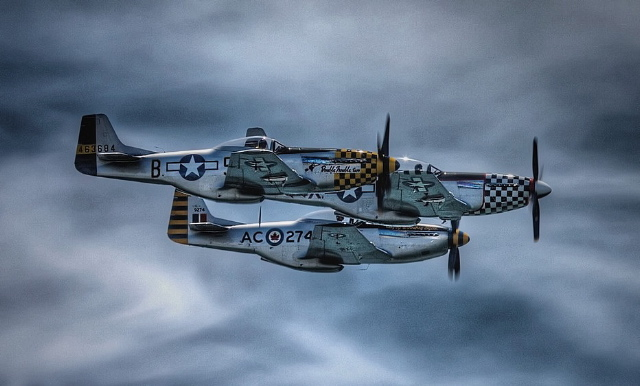
The Horsemen in Formation.

The Horsemen fly their formation aerobatic routine in three original P-51 Mustangs which previously served in World War II. These authentic Mustangs are owned by two of the Horsemen pilots. Nearly 15,000 Mustangs were produced during the war at a cost of $50,000 each. Today, approximately 150 Mustangs remain flying at an average cost of around $2,000,000.

The P-38s, F4Us, F8Fs and F-86s are also owned and operated by members of the team and are meticulously maintained by dozens of ground crews year round.

== Pilots ==
Steve Hinton is the Horsemen flight lead. He is the president of the Planes of Fame Air Museum in Chino, California, and has flown more than 350 different types. Hinton is also a civilian pilot for the USAF Heritage Flight program.

Dan Friedkin also flies the T-6 Texan, Spitfire, Wildcat and various helicopters. The USAF recently selected Friedkin as a Heritage Flight civilian pilot.

Ed Shipley is the founder of the group and is a long-time air show performer with more than 18 years of experience flying the T-6 Texan, P-51 Mustang, the F8F Bearcat and the F-86 Sabre. He was also one of the civilian founders of the USAF Heritage program and serves on the International Council of Air Shows’ Board of Directors.

Jim Beasly was the former flight lead, and is also a long time airshow performer. He is also a pilot with the USAF Heritage Flight program.

== Training and weekly routine ==
The Horsemen usually start their training routine in January at a private training airport in Texas and continue until the date of their first show in March, with intermittent training flights during the season. Throughout the season, the pilots tour the country promoting upcoming events and filming for an upcoming television series. Much of their footage could be found on ASB.tv before it closed in 2012.
