= Flanker 2.0 =

1999 video game

- Flanker 2.5 cover art
- Developer: Eagle Dynamics
- Publisher: Ubisoft
- Director: Nick Grey
- Platform: Microsoft Windows
- Release: 1999 (2.0); 2001 (2.5)
- Genre: Combat flight simulator
- Modes: Single-player, multiplayer

Flanker 2.0 (Russian: Фланкер 2.0) is a combat flight simulator developed by Eagle Dynamics and released in 1999. It is a direct sequel to Su-27 Flanker. The game allows players to fly the Sukhoi Su-27 and Su-33 in combat missions. In 2001, a major patch titled Flanker 2.5 was released for free to users who already owned Flanker 2.0, but was also available as a fully new purchasable game.

== Reception ==
IGN reviewed Flanker 2.0 with a rating of 7/10. The limited accessibility and frustrating campaign were criticized, concluding "there's a strong enough sim lurking in this hostile game that passionate flight simmers will find a real treat once they've cracked the shell and accepted the limitations. Anyone else need not apply." GameSpot reviewed Flanker 2.0 with a rating of 8.7/10, praising the graphical improvements and mission editor while critiquing the audio and campaign compared to contemporaries such as Falcon 4.0. PC Gamer US nominated Flanker 2.0 for its 1999 "Best Simulation" award, but it lost to MiG Alley. The editors wrote that Flanker 2.0 is "not everyone's cup of tea, and even veteran simmers find it a challenge to master every vagary of the Su-27. But for sheer authenticity, it can't be topped." In the United States, Flanker 2.0 sold 7,285 copies by April 2000.

Flanker 2.5 won PC Gamer US's "2002 Best Simulation" award. The magazine's Andy Mahood wrote, "When a $10 upgrade package (for a three-year-old combat flight sim, no less!) takes our 2002 Flight Sim of the Year honors, it's a remarkably sad commentary on the state of the genre". However, he praised the game as superior to Combat Flight Simulator 3 and Strike Fighters: Project 1, and declared that it "absolutely deserves" players' attention. Flanker 2.5 won GameSpot's annual "Best Simulation on PC" award, and was a runner-up in the publication's "Best Budget Game on PC" category, which went to Serious Sam: The Second Encounter.

In a 2024 feature on the history of military flight simulators, Len Hjalmarson wrote for PC Pilot that "Flanker 2.0 had some of the best-looking aircraft models on the PC. The game was also popular with online pilots and sported excellent weapons modeling and avionics. Yet Flanker 2.0 lacked something in gameplay."

== Sequels ==
- Lock On: Modern Air Combat is a continuation of the Flanker series.
- Digital Combat Simulator includes Su-27, Su-33 and J-11 simulations descended from the Flanker and Lock On versions.

== Other ==
- Flanker Attack
