= Mackonochie =

Mackonochie is a surname. Notable people with the surname include:

- Alexander Mackonochie (1825–1887), British priest
- Jim Mackonochie (died 2013), British Royal Navy officer
