= ASB.tv =

American aviation-related media company

Air Show Buzz
- Type: Private
- Industry: Aviation
- Founded: 2007
- Defunct: 2012
- Key people: Ed Shipley, Founder, Chairman; Holger Bartel, CEO
- Website: www.asb.tv

ASB.tv, or Air Show Buzz was a media company dedicated to the “Aerotainment” or entertainment and news in the aviation and air show industry.

== History ==
Air Show Buzz was founded in 2006 by Ed Shipley, Jim Beasley, retired USAF General Hal Hornburg, Stephanie Ross-Simon, and Deb Mitchell. Dan Friedkin joined the group in 2008. The group started as www.airshowbuzz.com and evolved into ASB.tv, as the company focused on video production and film production. The company plays an active role in many of the World's top air shows including Jones Beach New York Air Show, Flying Legends, Duxford England, Aviation Nation, Nellis AFB, Rhode Island Air National Guard, Wings Over Houston Air Show, Texas, Thunder Over the Boardwalk, Atlantic City, New Jersey by flying as The Horsemen Aerobatic Team and recording event footage. It exists today as one of the only dedicated aviation production company that owns World War II combat planes used for filming. The Air Show Buzz website and community was closed in mid-2012.

== Video production ==
Air Show Buzz films and distributes aviation related content in full 1080p. Discovery Channel, Lucasfilm and other mainstream media networks have utilized its content across their productions around aviation and the warbirds of World War II.

== Online and offline components ==
Currently, Air Show Buzz retains one of the largest aviation repositories of consumer-generated images and videos online. As of July 22, 2009 there were a total of 18,400 aviation photos and 3,600 aviation videos. With an active user base of more than 17,000 contributing members, the user base is among the largest in the industry.

== Glacier Girl ==
On June 22, 2007 www.asb.tv was part of the team documenting the attempted completion of a 1942 mission by a P-38 from the “Lost Squadron.” The P-38 was “Glacier Girl” recovered from the Greenland icecap ten years earlier. A mechanical problem with the P-38 forced the team to abandon its mission similar to the original team who in 1942 made an emergency landing on the ice because of foul weather. Ed Shipley, flying P-51 Mustang, “Miss Velma” continued the journey making the transatlantic crossing alone, in a single engine airplane. People could track the progress of the flight live on www.airshowbuzz.com and watched video clips and photos throughout the journey.
