= Eagle Dynamics =

Swiss video game company

Eagle Dynamics SA
- Type: Private
- Industry: Video games
- Founded: 1991 in Moscow, Russia
- Founder: Nick Grey; Igor Tishin
- Headquarters: Villars-sur-Glâne, Switzerland
- Products: Su-27 Flanker; Flanker 2.0; Lock On; DCS
- Brands: Lock On; DCS
- Owner: Nick Grey
- Number of employees: 190 (2024); 180 (2023); 55 (2008)
- Website: eagledynamics.ch

Eagle Dynamics SA (often abbreviated as ED) is a software company known for its flight simulation video games. Originally headquartered in Moscow, Russia, it is now headquartered in Villars-sur-Glâne, Switzerland.

== History ==
Eagle Dynamics was founded in 1991 by Nick Grey and Igor Tishin, with offices in Moscow and the UK. The company teamed up with Jim Mackonochie of Mindscape and publisher Strategic Simulations to produce its first game, a combat flight simulator. Released in November 1995, Su-27 Flanker offered players the opportunity to operate the Sukhoi Su-27 over the Crimean peninsula. Updates to the simulator were released as Flanker 2.0 (1999) and Flanker 2.5 (2001) and were published by Ubisoft following the acquisition of Strategic Simulations.

Their next release, Lock On: Modern Air Combat (2003) was published by 1C Company and Ubisoft. Lock On expanded Flanker's engine and simulation into a survey sim featuring multiple aircraft. Two expansions were released, Flaming Cliffs and Flaming Cliffs 2.

The company then released three titles in the Digital Combat Simulator (DCS) series of study sims. These included DCS: Black Shark and DCS: Black Shark 2, simulating the Kamov Ka-50, and DCS: A-10C Warthog simulating the Fairchild Republic A-10C. DCS featured highly detailed cockpits with a near-total simulation of all onboard systems including sensors, controls, and interfaces. The DCS series titles were published by The Fighter Collection, a private company founded by Nick Grey's father Stephen Grey.

DCS World (2012) made DCS: Black Shark 2, DCS: A-10C Warthog, and a Flaming Cliffs 3 pack playable under a single platform that incorporates all Eagle Dynamics products. Since then, Eagle Dynamics has released a number of DCS World modules as DLC along with graphical and engine upgrades. DCS: World also supports third-party modules sold through Eagle Dynamics' e-shop since 2013.

Following Tishin's death in 2018, Eagle Dynamics moved its headquarters to Switzerland, with multinational employees and contractors in Russia, Belarus, Ukraine, the United States, Canada, Germany, the United Kingdom, Italy, Spain and elsewhere.

== Legal troubles ==
=== Oleg Tishchenko ===
In 2016, one of the company's developers, Oleg Tishchenko, was indicted by a US grand jury on multiple charges including violations of the Arms Export Control Act. Tischenko was extradited from Georgia to the United States in 2018. In 2019, Tischenko was convicted in the United States on charges of illegally acquiring documentation for an F-16 fighter and smuggling its technical manuals to Moscow. He was sentenced by the Utah District Court to a term of 12 months and 1 day. Since the term of his conviction had already been served in federal custody, he was immediately released to Homeland Security agents for deportation. Tishchenko returned home in June 2019. Eagle Dynamics released a statement that Tischenko's actions were not related to any work related to his employment.

=== Russian Helicopters ===
On March 3 2025, the Ka-50, Mi-8 and Mi-24 modules for DCS were withdrawn from sale from Eagle Dynamics' Russian storefront at the request of Russian Helicopters, the owner of the Kamov and Mil brands.

== Development progression ==
Eagle Dynamics has consistently incorporated a theater of operations (known as the "Caucasus map") set along the shores of the Black Sea. Over time, the scope of this setting has undergone significant evolution.

Su-27 Flanker
1995
(Crimea alone)

LOMAC
2003
(Crimea and Northwest Caucasus)

Flaming Cliffs 2
2010
(Caucasus extended to Batumi)

Black Shark 2
2011
(Caucasus extended to Tbilisi)

== Video games ==
Year	Title	Developer	Publisher
1995	Su-27 Flanker	Eagle Dynamics	Strategic Simulations
1999	Flanker 2.0	Eagle Dynamics	Ubisoft
2001	Flanker 2.5	Eagle Dynamics	Ubisoft
2003	Lock On: Modern Air Combat	Eagle Dynamics	EU: Ubisoft; RU: 1C Company
2008	DCS: Black Shark	Eagle Dynamics	The Fighter Collection
2011	DCS: A-10C Warthog	Eagle Dynamics	The Fighter Collection
2011	DCS: Black Shark 2	Eagle Dynamics	The Fighter Collection
2012	DCS: World	Eagle Dynamics	The Fighter Collection
