= Digital Combat Simulator =

2008 video game

- Developer: Eagle Dynamics
- Publisher: The Fighter Collection
- Engine: EDGE 2.7
- Platform: Windows
- Release: RU: 17 October 2008; EN: 10 December 2008; GER: 7 March 2009; NA: 2 April 2009
- Genre: Combat flight simulator
- Modes: Single-player, multiplayer

Digital Combat Simulator (DCS) is a combat flight simulation game developed primarily by Eagle Dynamics and The Fighter Collection.

Several labels are used when referring to the DCS line of simulation products: DCS World, Modules, and Campaigns. DCS World is a free-to-play game that includes two free aircraft and two free maps. Modules are paid downloadable content that expand the game with add-on aircraft, maps, and other content. Campaigns are scripted sets of missions. Modules and campaigns are produced by Eagle Dynamics as well as third-parties.

== Gameplay ==
DCS World is a study sim in which players learn how to operate aircraft using realistic procedures. Aircraft are meticulously modeled from real-world data, including authentic flight models and subsystems and detailed cockpits with interactive buttons and switches. Digital manuals document the history, systems, and operation of each aircraft in extensive detail. The game has extensive support for joysticks and HOTAS input devices ranging from gamepads to 1:1 replica cockpits.

DCS World supports a wide variety of combat operations including combat air patrol, dogfighting, airstrikes, close air support, SEAD, and airlifts. Dozens of military airplanes and helicopters are available, spanning eras from World War II through the Cold War into the early 21st century. Popular modules include the AH-64D, F-16C, F/A-18C, F-14, and A-10C.

A mission editor is included for users to create their own scenarios and campaigns with support for scripting in Lua. Users can host their own servers with user-made missions for PVE and PVP multiplayer. The community has developed tools to create missions using procedural generation and real-time editing, and hosts servers that simulate dynamic battlefields.

DCS World acts as a unified modular platform, in contrast to previous installments in the series which were standalone products. This allows users of different modules to switch between aircraft and play together within a single game client. The platform also allows third-party developers to publish modules through Eagle Dynamics' storefront. Community mods have also been produced, such as the A-4E, C-130J, T-45C, UH-60L, and the JAS-39 Gripen.

=== Use as a military Air Force training aid ===
Some air forces have used DCS World as a training aid. A professional version called Mission Combat Simulator (MCS) is available for organizational use.

The United States Air Force's 355th Training Squadron at Davis-Monthan AFB makes use of DCS as an instrument and weapons-system trainer for the A-10C. The use of virtual reality headsets is preferred for a more immersive experience.

Before the Mirage 2000C was retired in 2022, the French Air Force used DCS for both instrument and tactical training with the M-2000C module, citing insufficient numbers of professional simulators.

Ukrainian pilots have trained using the A-10C II and F-16C modules for DCS World.

== Setting ==
DCS World has a number of maps available from Eagle Dynamics and third parties:

Map of all DCS World Terrains available or under development as of 2023. Note: Australia Top End was canceled in 2025.

=== Released ===
- Caucasus - The default map for the game, based on similar terrains from Su-27 Flanker, Flanker 2.0 and Lock On: Modern Air Combat. Includes areas of Georgia, Russia, Ukraine, and the Black Sea
- Mariana Islands - A free map centered around the Mariana island chain, including Guam, Rota, Tinian, Saipan, and "a score of lesser islands" such as Farallon de Medinilla, used as a bombing range by the US Navy
- Afghanistan - A map of the full land area of Afghanistan in the 21st century, starting with the southwestern area of the country including Kandahar Airfield, Herat and Camp Bastion. Available as a full map or as individually purchased overlapping regions of detail divided into southwest, north, and east.
- Cold War Germany - A third-party map centered on Germany during the Cold War
- Iraq - A map of Iraq including Baghdad, Sulaymaniyah, Erbil, and the airbases at Baghdad International Airport, Balad, Qayyarah and Erbil International Airport. Available as a full map or individually purchased North and South regions.
- Kola Peninsula - A third-party map comprising the northern Baltic Sea, upper areas of Norway, Sweden, Finland, and the northwest region of Russia including Murmansk Oblast. The terrain is the first DCS terrain from Orbx.
- Nevada Test and Training Range - A U.S. Air Force training range and location of the Red Flag exercise, which includes Nellis Air Force Base, Creech Air Force Base, Groom Lake, Las Vegas, McCarran International Airport, and Hoover Dam
- Persian Gulf - A map centered around the Strait of Hormuz. It includes the United Arab Emirates, as well as areas of Oman and Iran
- Sinai - A third-party map representing the Sinai Peninsula, eastern Egypt, and southern Israel
- South Atlantic - A third-party map including Argentina, Chile, and the Falkland Islands
- Syria - A third-party map centered around most of Syria, Cyprus, and Lebanon, as well as areas of Turkey, Israel, Jordan, and Iraq
- "The Channel" - A map of the southeast of England and northeastern France during World War II
- Normandy - A third-party map centered on the World War II battlefield of Normandy and the surrounding areas of southern England and northern and central France. Featured cities include Paris, London, Eastbourne, Brighton, Worthing, Portsmouth, Caen, Cherbourg, Le Havre, Rouen, Amiens, and Calais
- Mariana Islands WWII - A free WWII version of the Mariana Islands region as it was in the summer of 1944.

== Development ==
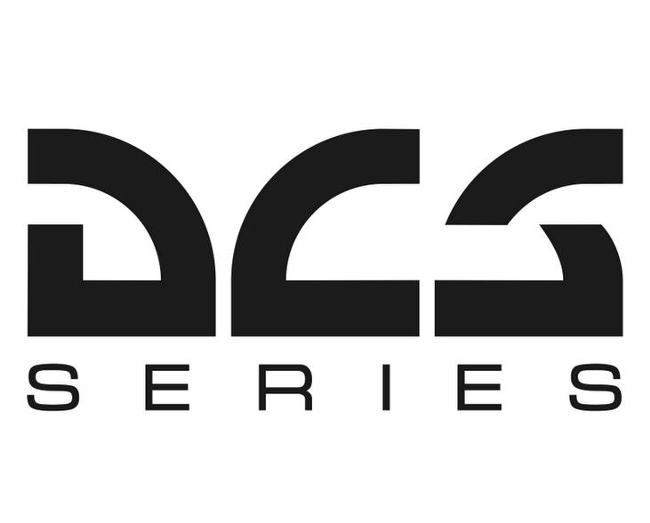
DCS Series logo (in use since 2011)

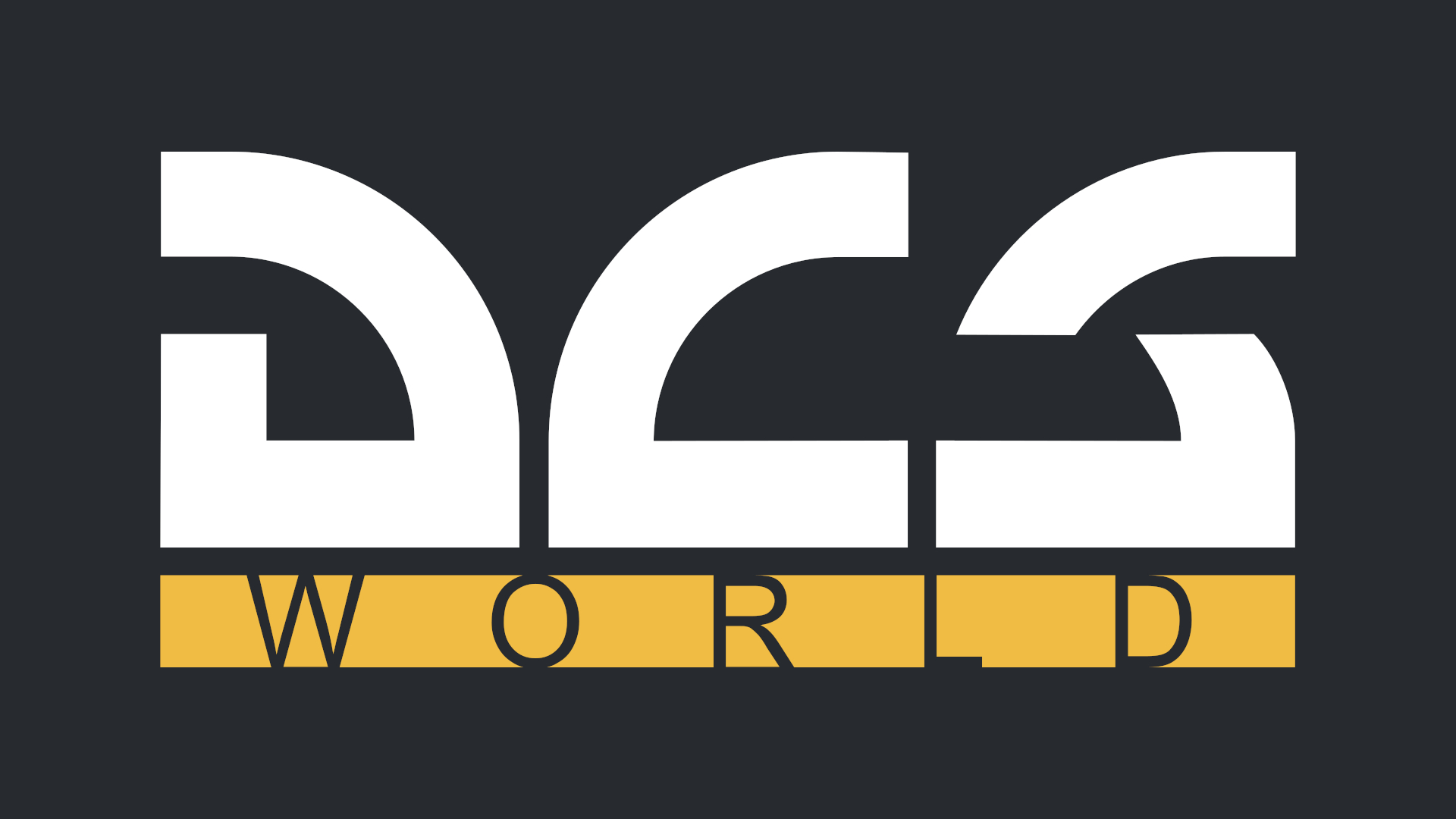
DCS World logo (in use since 2015)

DCS 15th anniversary logo (in use since 2023)

DCS World traces its lineage directly from the Flanker and Lock On: Modern Air Combat series of combat flight simulator games. Three standalone titles were released under the DCS name from 2008 through 2011. The first was DCS: Black Shark as a simulation of the Kamov Ka-50. DCS: A-10C Warthog, a standalone simulation of the A-10C, was released in February 2011. An upgrade for Black Shark, DCS: Black Shark 2, was released in November 2011 and allowed for network multiplayer with Warthog.

The open beta of DCS World was launched in May 2012. Warthog and Black Shark 2 were made available as modules. Flaming Cliffs 3 was released later that year, which added aircraft from Lock On as modules of DCS World. The first third-party module, the Bell UH-1H Huey, was also announced in 2012.

DCS World 1.5 was released in October 2015 featuring a new DirectX 11 graphics engine and a unified executable.

In November 2015, DCS World 2.0 was released as an open alpha while 1.5 continued to be supported as a stable release. 2.0 added support for more detailed terrain including the Nevada Test and Training Range map. DCS World 2.1 was released in 2017 and added support for deferred shading and physically based rendering, followed by DCS World 2.2 that same year. The next major release, DCS World 2.5, added an improved Caucasus map in 2018. 2.5 replaced 1.5 as the stable release version coinciding with a Steam release.

DCS World 2.7 was released as an open beta in April 2021, with new weather and clouds as well as improved piston engine simulation. 2.7 became the stable release in June of that year. DCS World 2.8 was released as an open beta in October 2022, improving atmospheric effects and AI basic fighter maneuvers. DCS World 2.9 was released as an open beta in October 2023, featuring support for Nvidia DLSS and AMD FSR, improvements to multiplayer voice chat, higher fidelity data link and radar simulation, and new graphics and camera effects. The open beta version of DCS World was discontinued at the end of 2023, and all subsequent updates have been released directly to the stable release version.

In July 2024, Flaming Cliffs 2024 added survey sim versions of the F-5E Tiger, F-86F Sabre, and MiG-15bis. These versions feature professional flight model and updated 3D modelling comparable to the modelling and texturing update of Flaming Cliffs 3 that occurred in March of 2024. The 2024 modules were adapted from work created for another Eagle Dynamics product, Modern Air Combat, which was "shelved" earlier in 2024. Flaming Cliffs 2024 is available as a full pack, as an upgrade for owners of Flaming Cliffs 3, or as individually sold modules.

Over the course of development, modules have introduced new features to the simulator including improved flight models and damage models, multi-crew aircraft with multiple players or AI acting as crew and enhanced FLIR simulation.

=== Third-party developers ===
A large portion of aircraft and terrains in the DCS World ecosystem are developed by companies officially licensed by Eagle Dynamics to produce modules for the simulator. Third parties also create single-player campaigns. Third-party content is sold through Eagle Dynamics' storefronts on their eShop and Steam.

In 2018, third-party developer VEAO ceased development of their Hawk module. Eagle Dynamics offered full refunds to customers and introduced a code escrow policy for future third-party agreements.

In June 2018, Belsimtek, a Belarusian developer, announced its merger with Eagle Dynamics. The company's website was taken down in 2020.

In April 2025, most modules developed by third-party developer RAZBAM Simulations were delisted due to a dispute between RAZBAM and Eagle Dynamics.

== Reception ==
PC Gamer reviewed the DCS: A-10C Warthog module with a rating of 92/100. IGN praised the care and attention to detail, though remarking a level of inaccessibility: "Yes, there is a 44-page 'Quickstart' guide and yes, there are tutorials – a bevy of lengthy, highly instructive tutorials, actually – but precious little of this is designed for the neophyte or even the marginally experienced jet jock."

PC PowerPlay also reviewed A-10C Warthog favorably, praising its flight simulation as "tense" and "realistic", and highlighting it as a "true to life representation of what it feels like to fly this slow-moving ground-pound aircraft".

SimHQ praised the Ka-50 module, noting the attention to technical details such as the recoil of the main gun affecting flight dynamics, along with smaller details such as the windscreen wiper having several modes. Also noted was the difficulty of flying the helicopter. The Ka-50 simulation earned SimHQ's Simulation Product of the Year award for 2008.

PC Pilot reviewed the third-party F-14 Tomcat module with a score of 97/100. The review concluded that "[DCS: F-14 Tomcat] is truly one of the greatest simulation modules ever created for a PC flight simulator." The complexity and depth of the multi-crew cockpit and systems was described as exceptional.

HeliSimmer.com's article on the work-in-progress AH-64D module's early access version praised the 3D modeling and soundscape while noting the incomplete systems and critiquing the flight model's accuracy compared to a real helicopter. Despite these shortcomings, it was said to be "the best representation of an AH-64D since Jane's Longbow 2."

DCS World's gameplay has been critiqued, in contrast to its aircraft simulation. FlyAndWire wrote that "DCS is the best 'cockpit simulator' around" but criticized the interaction between the aircraft and the game environment.
