= Warbird =

Vintage military aircraft operated by civilians

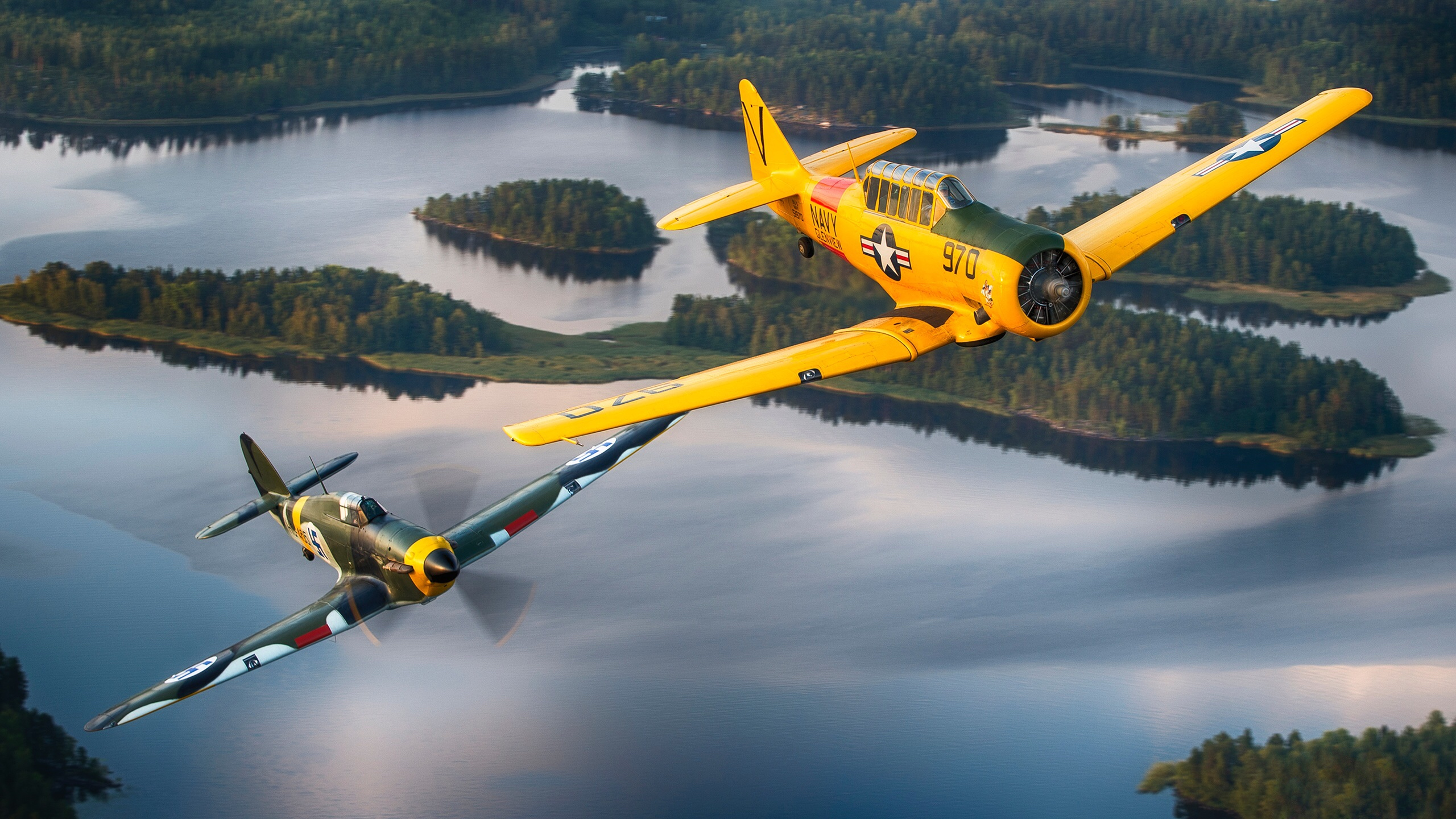
Hawker Hurricane and T-6 Texan warbirds in flight over Finland

A warbird is any vintage military aircraft now operated by civilian organizations and individuals, or in some instances, by historic arms of military forces, such as the Battle of Britain Memorial Flight, the Royal Australian Air Force's No. 100 Squadron, or the South African Air Force Museum Historic Flight.

== Naming ==
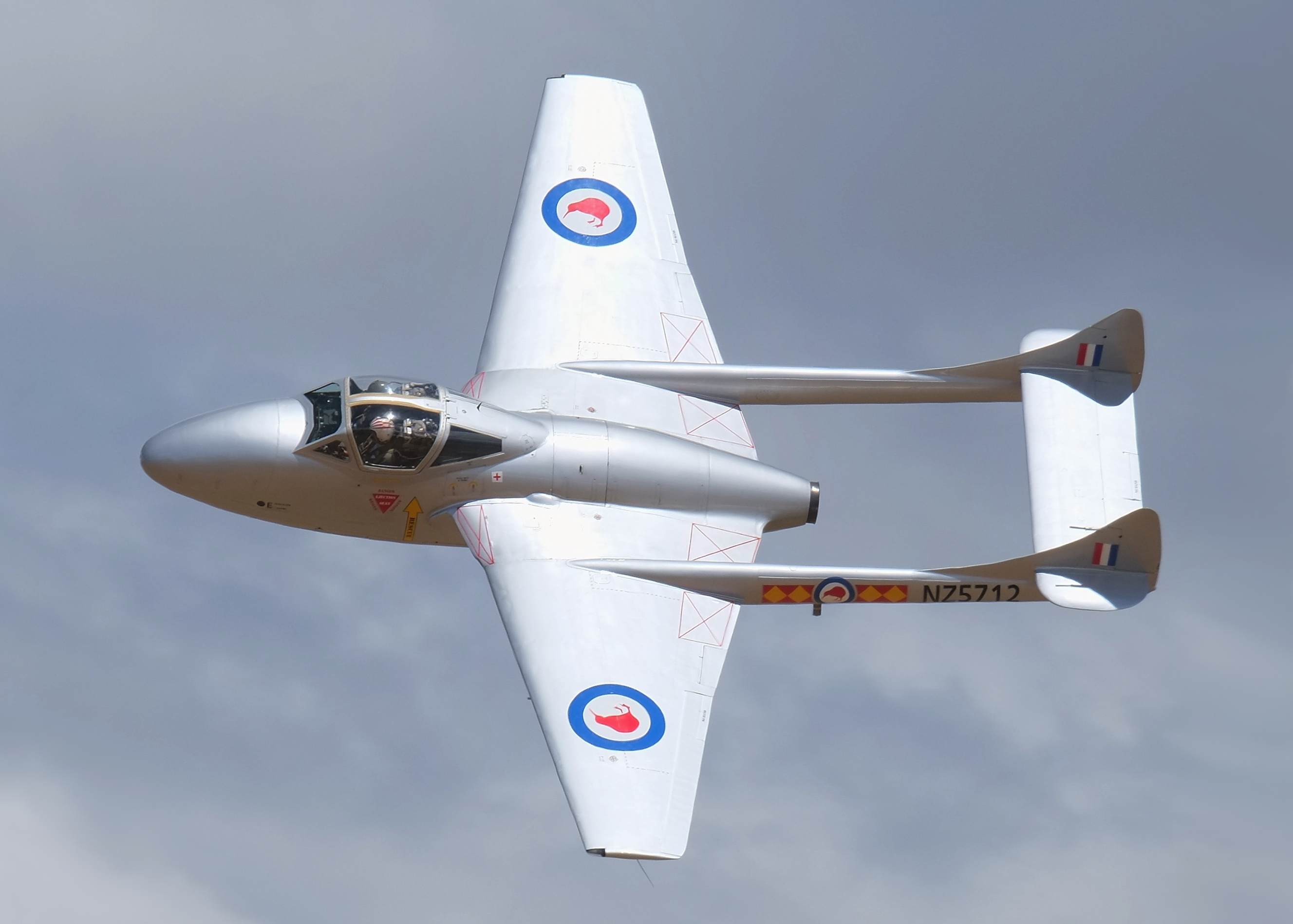
A restored, privately owned de Havilland Vampire warbird

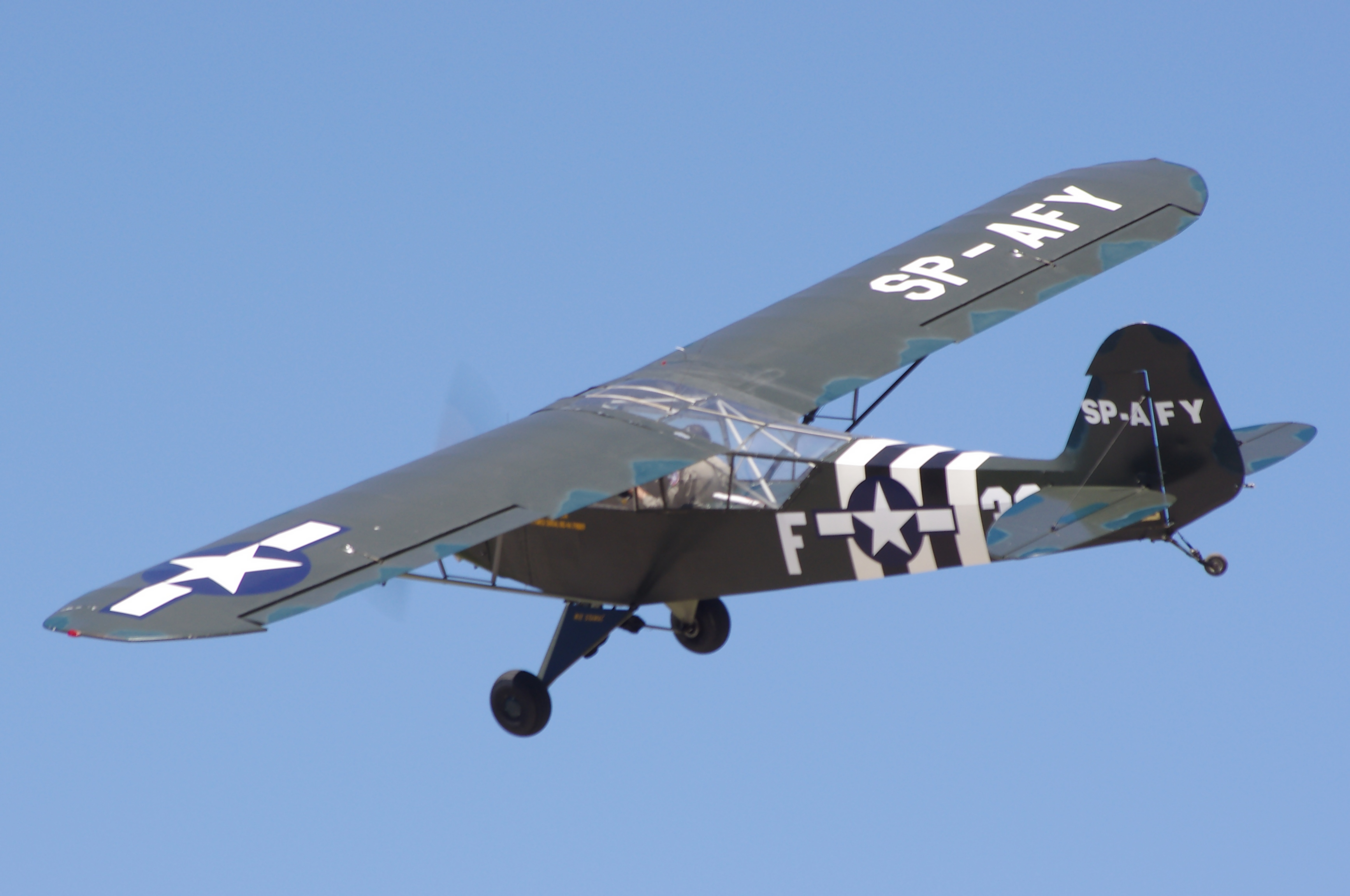
A Polish-registered Piper L-4 Grasshopper

Although the term originally implied piston-driven aircraft from the World War II era, it is now often extended to include all airworthy former military aircraft, including jet-powered aircraft and helicopters.

The several different types of warbirds include the fighter, trainer, bomber, jet, transport, utility, etc. Examples of aircraft types include the North American P-51 Mustang, Vought F4U Corsair, Curtiss P-40 Warhawk, North American B-25 Mitchell, Boeing B-17 Flying Fortress, North American T-6 Texan, Beechcraft T-34 Mentor, Messerschmitt Bf 109, Hawker Hurricane, Douglas C-47 Skytrain, Avro Lancaster, Grumman TBF Avenger, and Supermarine Spitfire.

Sometimes, modern production aircraft such as Allison V-1710-powered Yakovlev Yak-9s from Yakovlev and replicas and reproductions of vintage aircraft are called "warbirds", such as Messerschmitt Me 262s built by the Me 262 Project and Focke-Wulf Fw 190s by Flug + Werk; this can include any one of a large number of different aircraft designs from between World War I and the late 1930s, when military aircraft design was less complex. Such replicated warbirds may even be powered by vintage engines from the era of the aircraft design being flown, as Cole Palen and others associated with his institution did at Palen's Old Rhinebeck Aerodrome aviation museum with accurate and airworthy reproductions of the Fokker Dr.I, Fokker D.VII, Fokker D.VIII, Sopwith Camel, and Sopwith Dolphin World War I aircraft.

== Major operators of historic aircraft ==
- Alpine Fighter Collection of New Zealand Fighter Pilots Museum
- Amicale Jean-Baptiste Salis

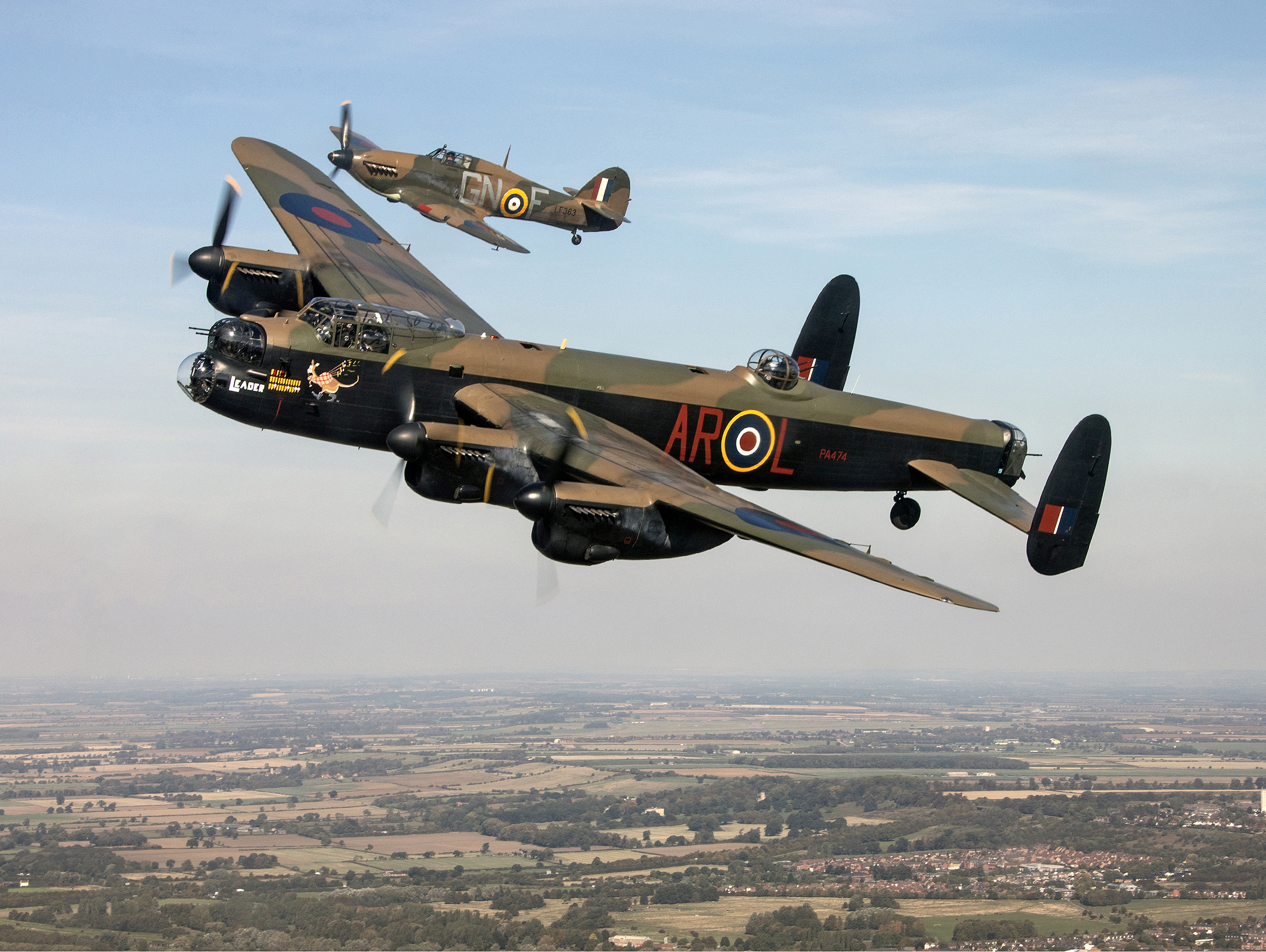
Lancaster B I PA474 in 460 Squadron (RAAF) colours, escorted by Hurricane Mk.IIc LF363 in 249 Sqn livery operated by the Battle of Britain Memorial Flight.

- Battle of Britain Memorial Flight
- Canadian Warplane Heritage Museum
- Historical Aviation Restoration Society
- Shuttleworth Collection

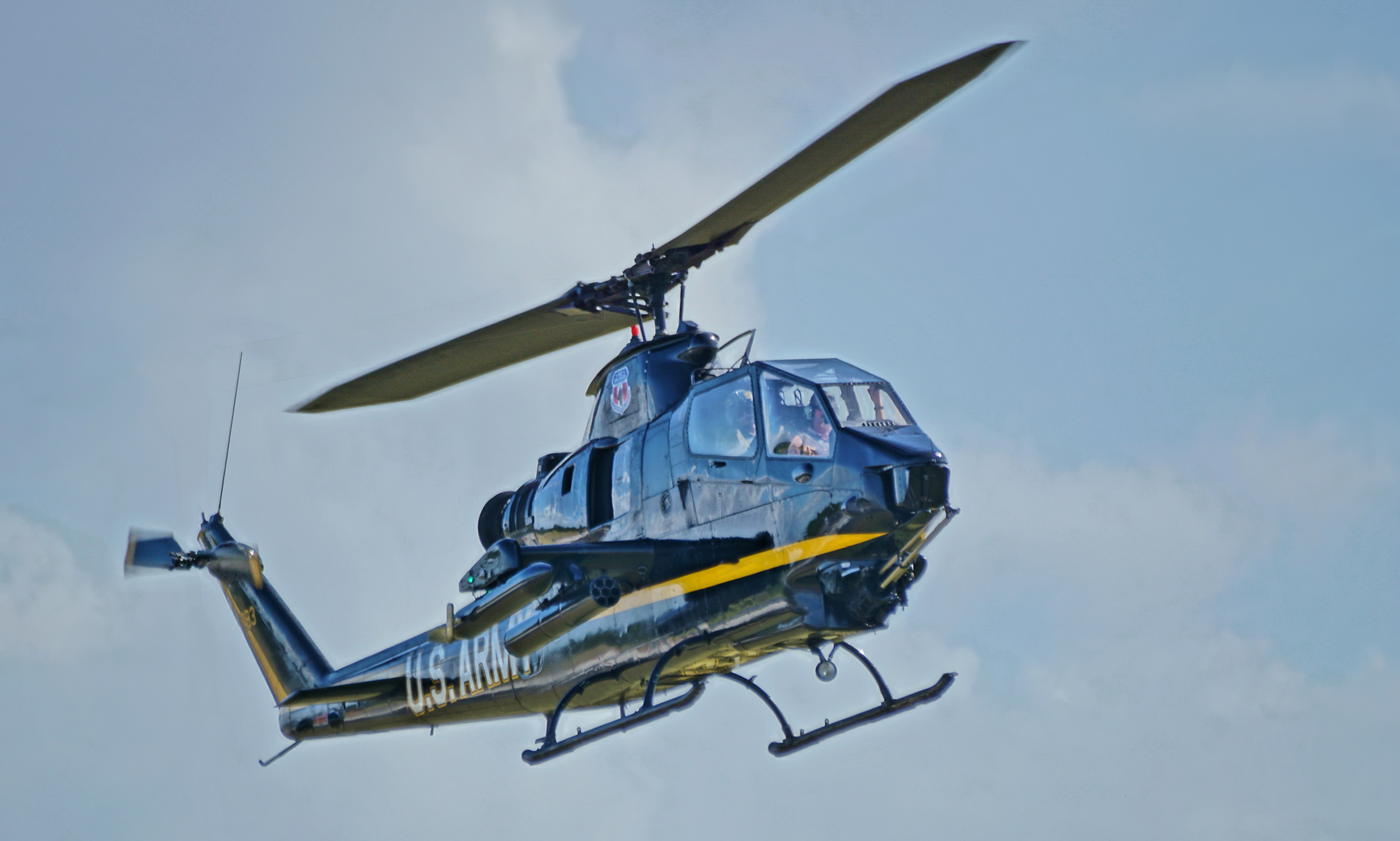
An AH-1 Cobra from the Army Aviation Heritage Foundation

- Royal Australian Air Force No. 100 Squadron
  - Temora Historic Flight (Temora Aviation Museum)

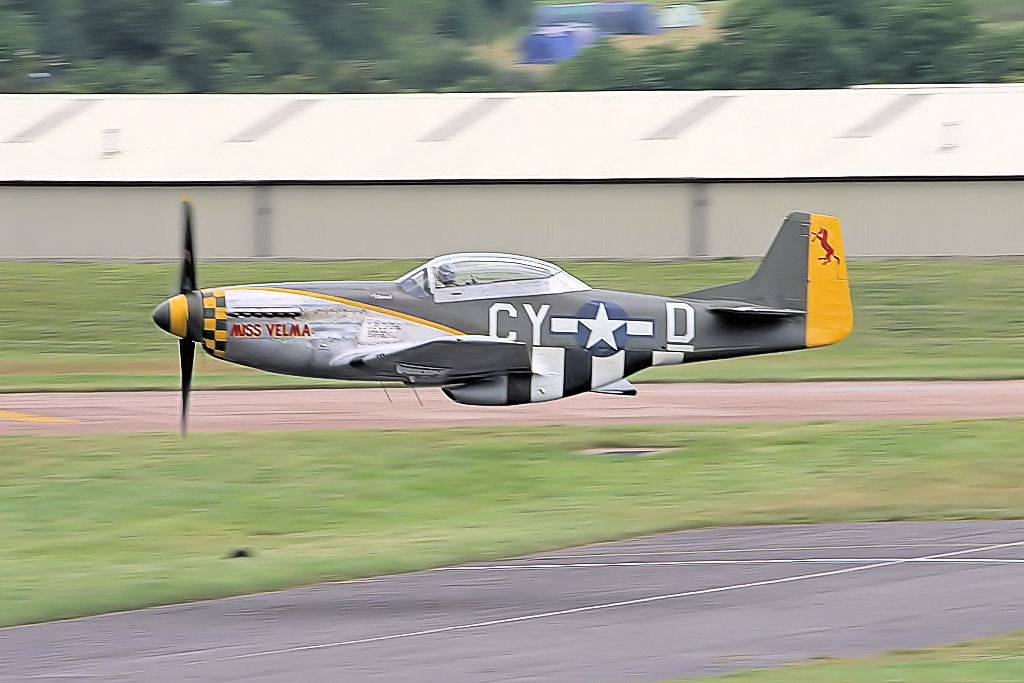
The Fighter Collection's TF-51, a training variant of the P-51.

- The Fighter Collection
- In the United States:
  - Army Aviation Heritage Foundation
  - Berlin Airlift Historical Foundation
  - Collings Foundation
  - Commemorative Air Force
  - EAA Aviation Museum
  - Fantasy of Flight
  - Lone Star Flight Museum
  - Military Aviation Museum
  - Old Rhinebeck Aerodrome
  - Planes of Fame Museum
  - Yankee Air Force

== Restoration process ==
Vintage warbird restoration, or classic aircraft restoration, is the process of taking aircraft from the previous era, and performing processes such as maintenance, repairs, and refurbishments to restore the aircraft to its original military configuration (minus any working weaponry). According to Classic Warplanes, some of the tasks performed on these vintage aircraft include:

- Structural repairs
- Standard maintenance
- Interior and exterior paint
- Decals and stamps
- Upholstery replacements
- Control heads and radios
- Parachutes, ejection seats, and ejection seat cartridges
- Rewiring
- Replacement of real weaponry with nonoperating replicas

== Airshows ==
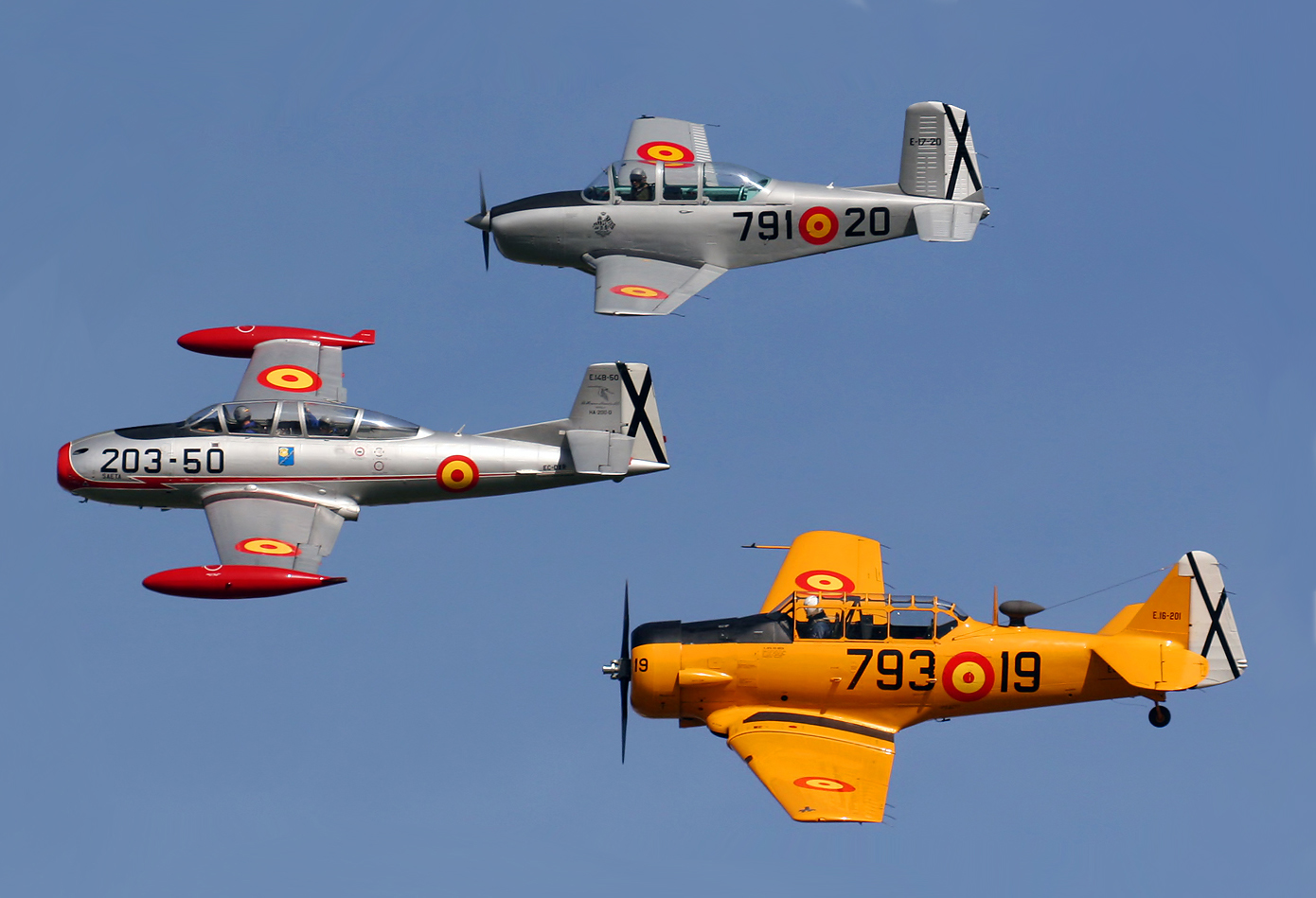
HA-200, T-34, and T-6 warbirds fly in formation

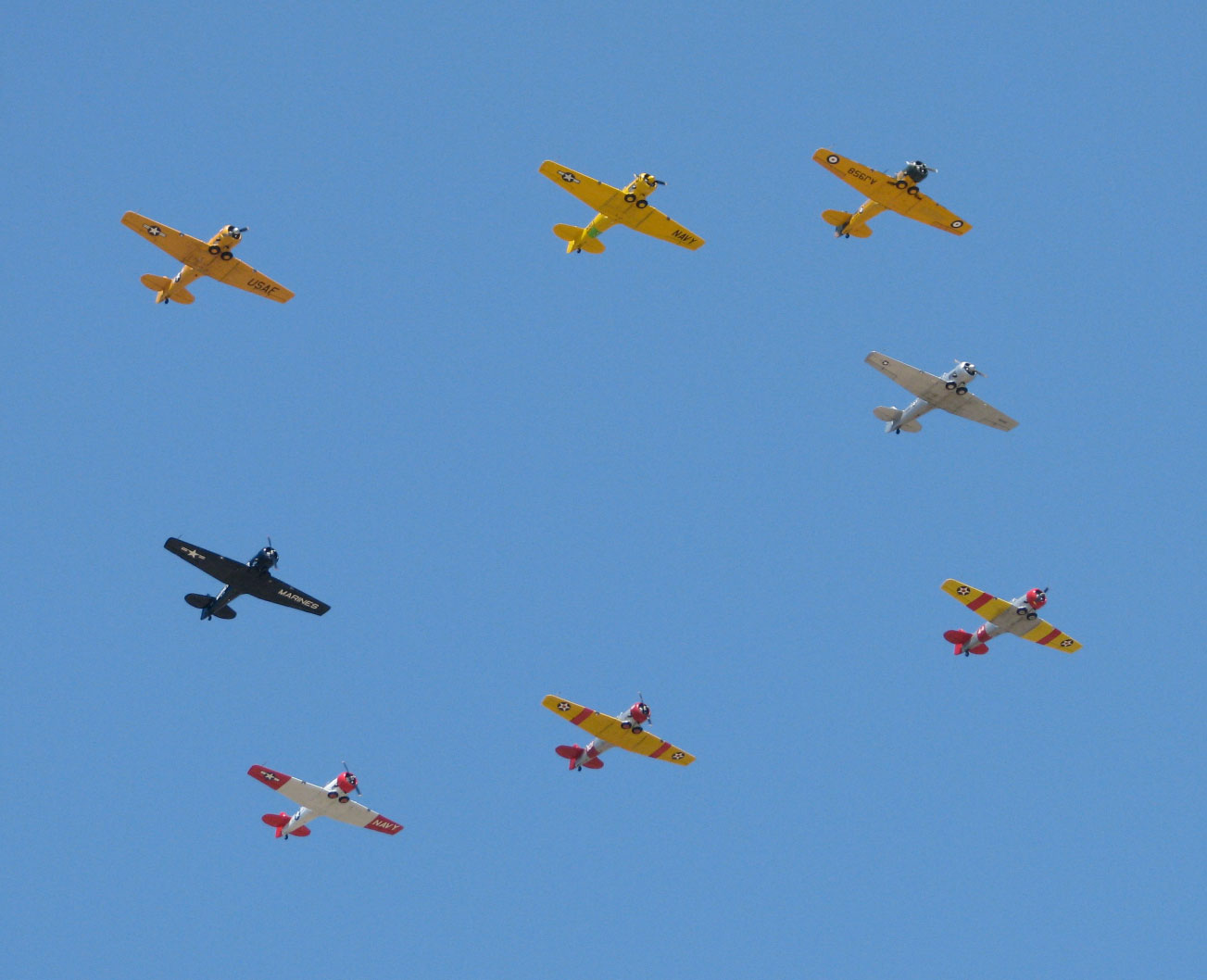
2008 Commemorative Air Force AIRSHO

Restored warbirds are a frequent attraction at airshows. Airshows are held all over the world annually. Warbird Alley claims that some of the best-known airshows that feature warbirds are:

- Alliance Airshow – Fort Worth, Texas
- Commemorative Air Force AIRSHO – Midland, Texas
- Classic Fighters – Blenheim, Marlborough, NZ
- Dayton Airshow – Dayton, Ohio
- EAA AirVenture Oshkosh – Oshkosh, Wisconsin
- History of Flight Airshow – Geneseo, New York
- Indianapolis Airshow – Indianapolis, Indiana
- Miramar Airshow – Miramar, California
- Sun 'n Fun – Lakeland, Florida
- Warbirds over the Beach – Virginia Beach, Virginia
- Warbirds over Monroe – Monroe, North Carolina
- Warbirds over Wanaka – Wānaka, Otago

In Europe, one of the best-known warbird airshows is the annual Flying Legends arranged in Imperial War Museum Duxford in UK. La Ferté-Alais air show in France collects warbirds annually, too. Warbirds fly also in most of the Shuttleworth Collection flying days in UK every summer.

In Australia a biennial event, Warbirds Downunder, is held at the Temora Aviation Museum in Temora, NSW "for a two-day celebration of Australian aviation history". The event features warbirds from private and museum collections around the country (such as the HARS collection), both in flying and static displays, as well as being regularly supported by current squadrons of the Royal Australian Air Force, including No. 100 Squadron and the RAAF formation aerobatic display team, the Roulettes.

In New Zealand there is an airshow over the Easter Weekend each year, this alternates between the Warbirds Over Wanaka in Wānaka, Otago and Classic Fighters in Blenheim, Marlborough. These are well supported by the large fleet of warbirds in NZ, as well as the RNZAF and RAAF. There are also smaller shows held in Masterton, Tauranga and Auckland.

== Air racing ==
Highly modified and "stock" warbirds can also frequently be seen at air races, since World War II-era fighters are among the fastest propeller-driven airplanes ever built.

The premier event for warbird air racing is the Reno Air Races, held each September near Reno, Nevada. There are several classes of racing that facilitate the application of warbirds in the sport, including the:

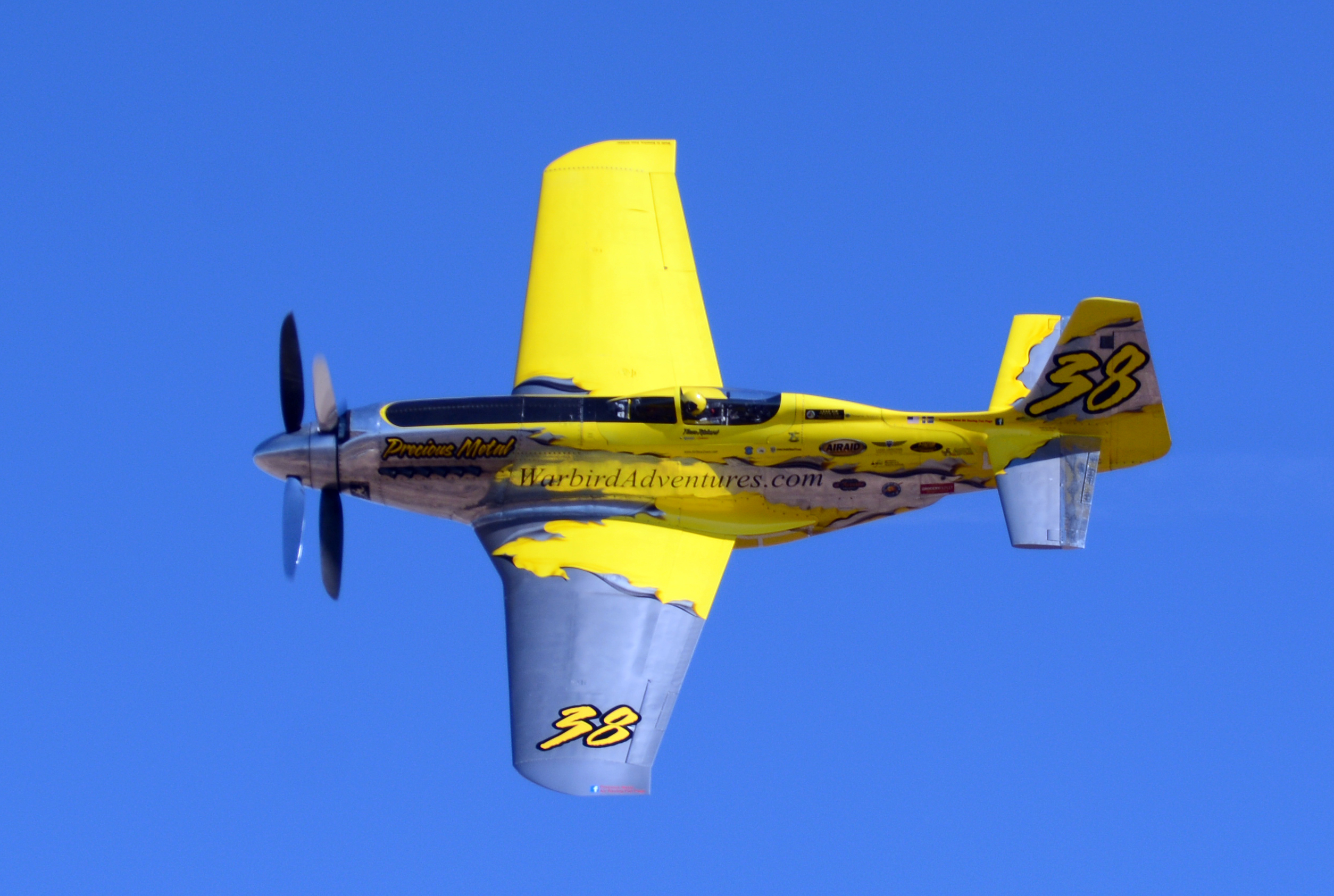
'Precious Metal', a highly modified P-51, at the 2014 Reno Air Race

- Jet Class
- T-6 Class
- Unlimited Class

Some of the most popular warbirds for racing are the North American P-51 Mustang, the Hawker Sea Fury, the Grumman F8F Bearcat, and the North American T-6 Texan.

In more recent years, straight wing, jet-powered warbirds such as the Aero L-29 Delfin, Aero L-39 Albatros, BAC Jet Provost, De Havilland Vampire, and PZL TS-11 Iskra have seen the conception of their own racing class, known simply as the Jet Class.

== Clubs and organizations ==
The Australian Warbirds Association represents warbird owners in Australia and is responsible for oversight of warbird operations, a function delegated by Australia's National Airworthiness Authority, the Civil Aviation Safety Authority. Canadian groups include Warbirds Canada, Western Warbirds and the Canadian Harvard Aircraft Association. The New Zealand Warbirds Association supports warbird owners in that country.

Some organizations in the United States are:

- Experimental Aircraft Association (EAA): The primary focus of the group started with building individual airplanes, and it soon grew to include antiques, classics, warbirds, aerobatic aircraft, ultralights, helicopters, and contemporary manufactured aircraft.
- Warbirds of America is a nonprofit organization formed in 1964. A year after its start, it became a branch of the EAA.
- Classic Jet Aircraft Association
- Commemorative Air Force

== See also ==
- Antique aircraft
- Aviation archaeology
- Aviation museum
- Category:Lists of surviving aircraft
