= Su-27 Flanker (video game) =

1995 video game

SU-27 Flanker
- Developer: Eagle Dynamics
- Publisher: Strategic Simulations
- Director: Nick Grey
- Platforms: Windows 95, MS-DOS
- Release: Windows: NA: November 10, 1995; EU: 1995; MS-DOS: NA: May 26, 1996; EU: 1996
- Genre: Combat flight simulation
- Modes: Single-player, multiplayer

Su-27 Flanker is a combat flight simulator released for Windows 95 in 1995 on CD-ROM. An MS-DOS version followed in 1996. Su-27 Flanker was developed in Russia by Eagle Dynamics and published by Strategic Simulations. The game takes place in Crimea and allows players to fly the Sukhoi Su-27 in various combat roles. It includes a mission editor for creating custom gameplay scenarios.

== Version history ==
- Su-27 Flanker: released 1995
- Su-27 Flanker Mission Disk: released 1997
- Su-27 Flanker: Squadron Commander's Edition: released 1997, compilation that includes the main game and expansion

== Reception ==
Reception

Review scores
Publication	Score
Next Generation	2/5
PC Games	A−

Reviewing the Windows 95 version, a Next Generation critic summarized the game as being "designed for realism over ease of use." He noted that the notations in the cockpit are in Russian, and that the game has no introduction of any sort when it boots up, instead simply presenting a long list of files with undescriptive names, leaving the player with no idea of where to start. He concluded that serious flight sim enthusiasts should consider getting the game for its "unsurpassed" realistic modeling of the Su-27, but that anyone else would be completely lost. He scored it two out of five stars.

Su-27 Flanker was a runner-up for Computer Gaming World's 1995 "Simulation of the Year" award, which ultimately went to EF2000. The editors wrote that Su-27 Flanker features "an astonishing variety of allies and targets in the air and on the ground, as well as extremely challenging computer pilot AI."

== Sequels ==
- Flanker 2.0: is a direct sequel to Su-27 Flanker.
- Lock On: Modern Air Combat is a continuation of the Flanker series.
- Digital Combat Simulator includes Su-27, Su-33 and J-11 simulations descended from the Flanker and Lock On versions.
