= Grumman F8F Bearcat =

American single-engine carrier-based fighter aircraft

F8F Bearcat
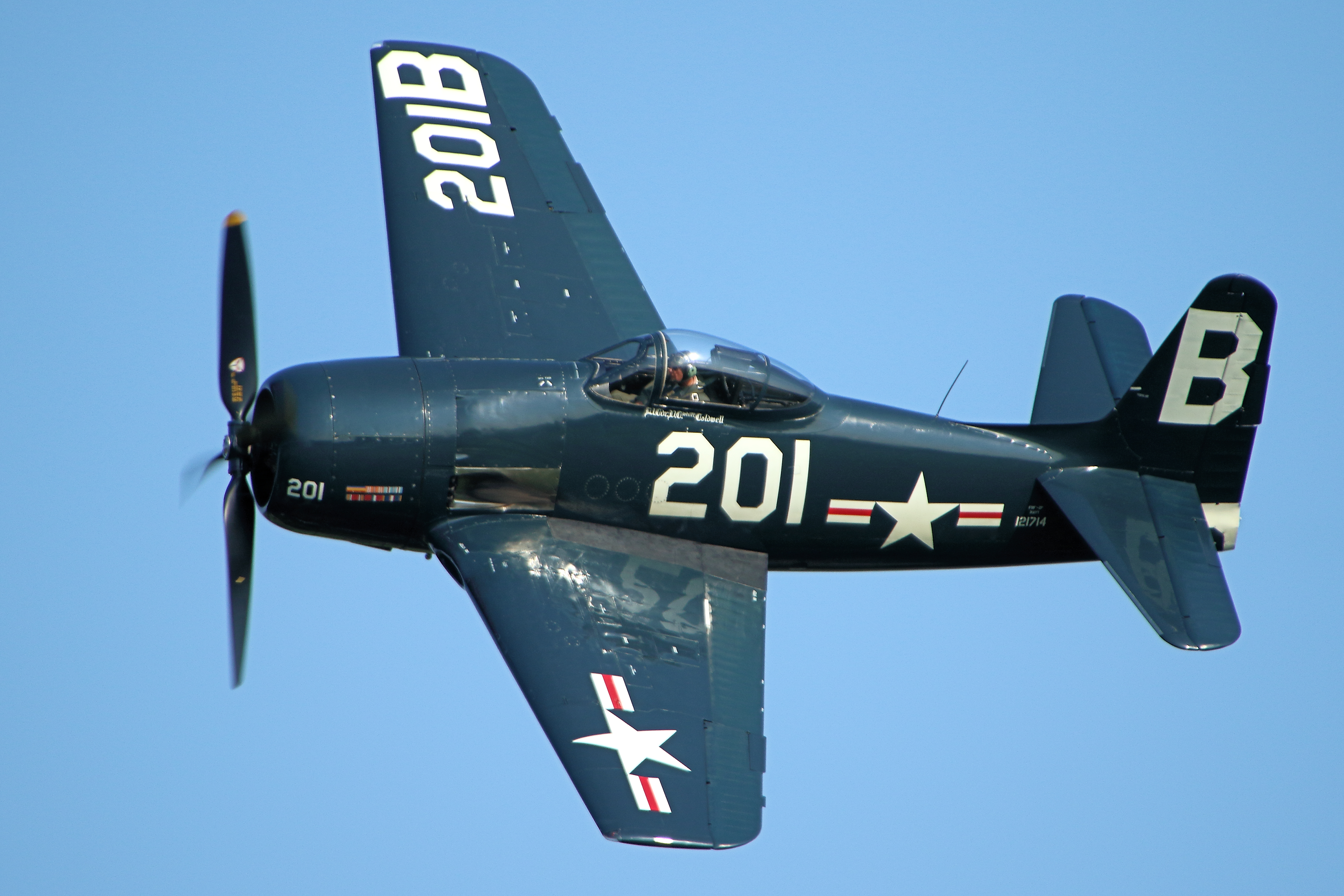
- An F8F Bearcat warbird over Fly Navy Day 2016

General information
- Type: Fighter aircraft
- National origin: United States
- Manufacturer: Grumman
- Primary users: United States Navy United States Marine Corps; French Air Force; Royal Thai Air Force
- Number built: 1,265

History
- Introduction date: 21 May 1945
- First flight: 21 August 1944
- Retired: 1963 VNAF

The Grumman F8F Bearcat is an American single-engined, carrier-based, fighter aircraft introduced in late World War II. It served during the mid-20th century in the United States Navy, the United States Marine Corps, and the air forces of other nations. It was Grumman Aircraft's last piston-engined fighter aircraft. Adapted versions of the Bearcat have broken speed records for piston-engined aircraft. Today, the Bearcat is popular among warbird owners and air racers.

== Design and development ==
=== Concept ===
The Bearcat concept began during a meeting between Battle of Midway veteran F4F Wildcat pilots and Grumman vice president Jake Swirbul at Pearl Harbor on 23 June 1942. At the meeting, Lieutenant Commander Jimmie Thach emphasized one of the most important requirements in a good fighter plane was "climb rate".

Climb performance is strongly related to the power-to-weight ratio, and is maximized by wrapping the smallest and lightest possible airframe around the most powerful engine. Another goal was that the G-58 (Grumman's design designation for the aircraft) should be able to operate from escort carriers, which were then limited to the obsolescent F4F Wildcat, as the Grumman F6F Hellcat was too large and heavy. A small, lightweight aircraft would make this possible. After intensively analyzing carrier warfare in the Pacific Theater of Operations for a year and a half, Grumman began development of the G-58 Bearcat in late 1943.

=== Design ===
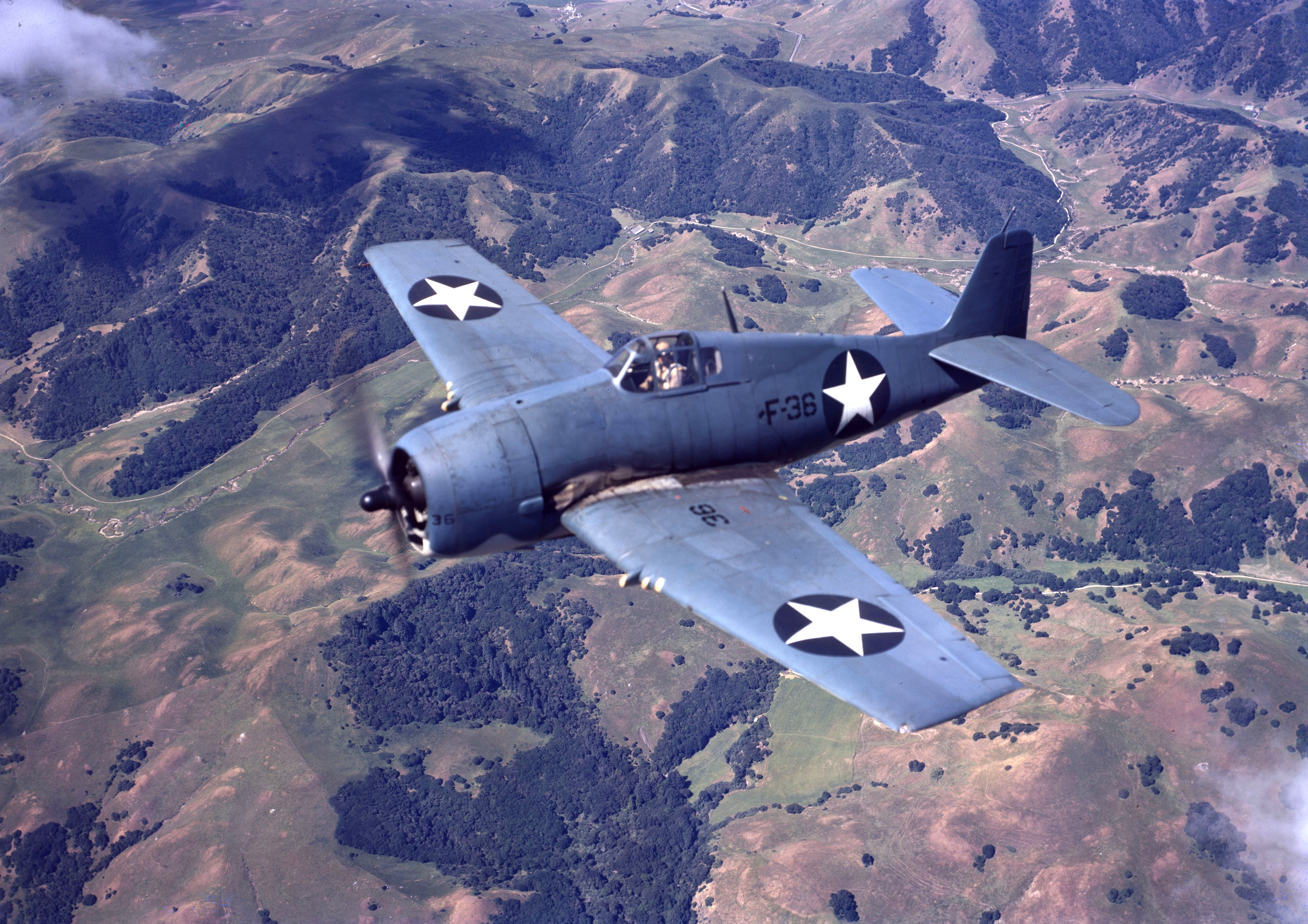
The Bearcat was influenced by the larger F6F Hellcat.

In 1943, Grumman was introducing the F6F Hellcat, powered by the Pratt & Whitney R-2800 engine, which provided 2,000 horsepower (1,500 kW). The R-2800 was the most powerful American engine, so it would be retained for the G-58. This meant that improved performance would have to come from a lighter airframe.

To meet this goal, the Bearcat's fuselage was about 5 ft (1.5 m) shorter than the Hellcat, and was cut down vertically behind the cockpit. This allowed the use of a bubble canopy, the first to be fitted to a US Navy fighter. The vertical stabilizer was the same height as the Hellcat's, but had an increased aspect ratio, giving it a thinner look. The wingspan was 7 ft (2.1 m) less than the Hellcat's. Structurally, the fuselage used flush riveting and spot welding, with a heavy-gauge 302W aluminum alloy skin suitable for carrier landings. Armor protection was provided for the pilot, engine, and oil cooler.

The Hellcat used a 13 ft 1 in (3.99 m), three-bladed Hamilton Standard propeller. A slight reduction in size was made by moving to a 12 ft 7 in (3.84 m) Aeroproducts four-bladed propeller. Keeping the prop clear of the deck required long landing gear, which, combined with the shortened fuselage, gave the Bearcat a significant "nose-up" profile on land. The hydraulically operated undercarriage used an articulated trunnion that extended the length of the oleo legs when lowered; as the undercarriage retracted, the legs were shortened, enabling them to fit into a wheel well, which was entirely in the wing. An additional benefit of the inward-retracting units was a wide track, which helped counter propeller torque on takeoff and gave the F8F good ground and carrier deck handling.

The design team had set the goal that the G-58 should weigh 8,750 lb (3,970 kg) fully loaded. As development continued, but this was found to be impossible to achieve, as the structure of the new fighter had to be made strong enough for aircraft carrier landings. Weight-saving measures included restricting the internal fuel capacity to 160 US gallons (610 L) (later 183 US gallons [690 L]) and limiting the fixed armament to four .50 cal Browning AN/M2 machine guns, two in each wing. The limited range due to the reduced fuel load meant it would be useful in the interception role, but the Hellcat would still be needed for longer range patrols. A later role was defending the fleet against kamikaze attacks. Compared to the Hellcat, the Bearcat was 20% lighter, had a 30% better rate of climb, and was 50 mph (80 km/h) faster.

Another weight-saving concept the designers found was detachable wingtips. The wings were designed to fold at a point about 2/3 out along the span, reducing the space taken up on the carrier. Normally, the hinge system would have to be built very strong to transmit loads from the outer portions of the wing to the main spar in the inner section, which adds considerable weight. Instead of building the entire wing to be able to withstand high-g loads, only the inner portion of the wing was able to do this. The outer portions were more lightly constructed, and designed to snap off at the hinge line if the force exceeded 7.5 g. In this case, the aircraft would still be flyable and could be repaired after returning to the carrier. This saved 230 lb (100 kg).

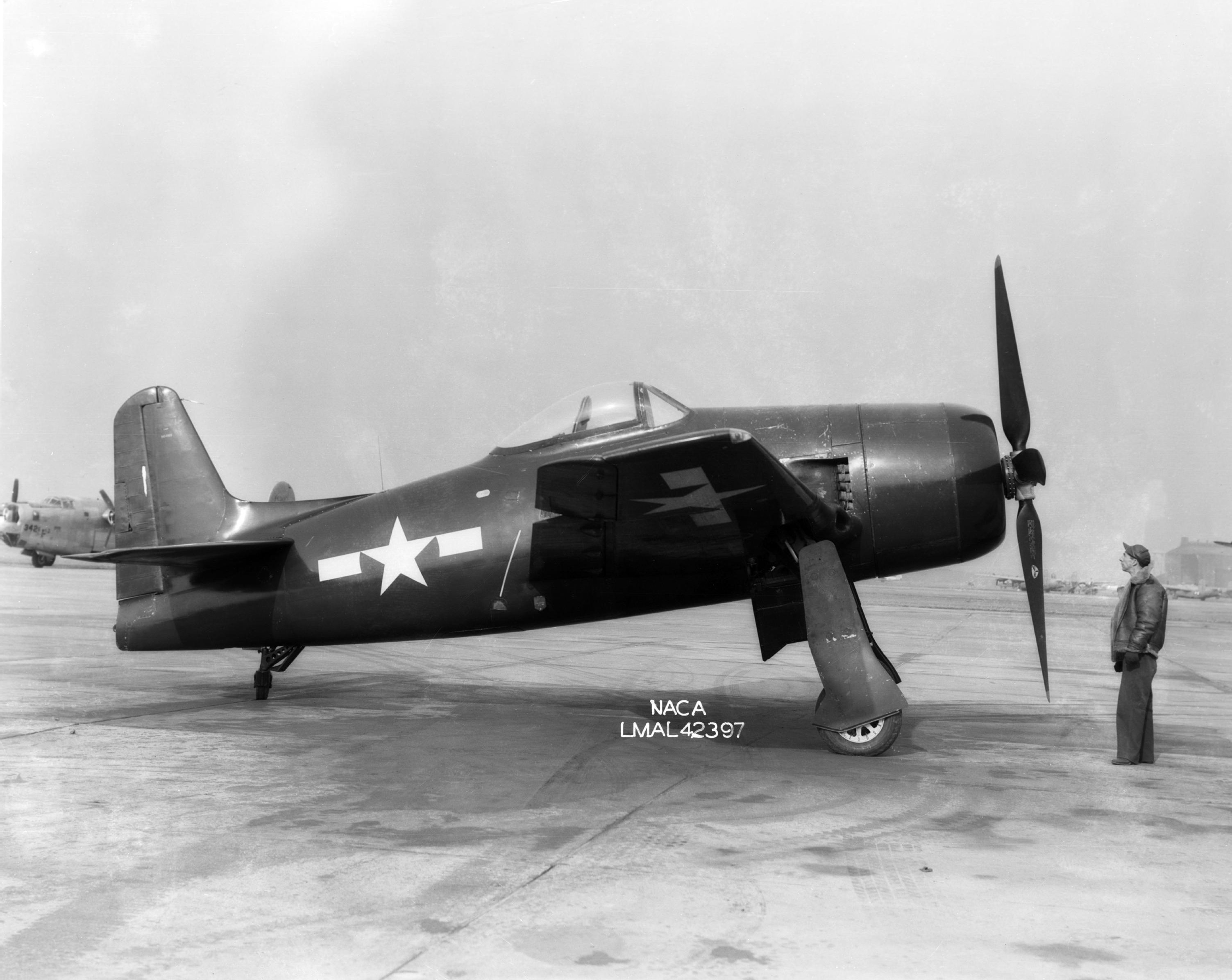
An XF8F-1 prototype at the NACA Langley Research Facility in 1945

=== Prototypes ===
The design was completed in November 1943 and an order for two prototypes was placed on 27 November 1943 under the BuAir designation XF8F-1. The first prototype flew on 21 August 1944, only nine months after the design effort started. (Note: One account states the first flight on 13 August.) The initial flight test demonstrated a 4,800 ft/min (1,500 m/min) climb rate and a top speed of 424 mph (682 km/h). Compared to the Vought F4U Corsair, the Bearcat was marginally slower, but more maneuverable and climbed more quickly.

Testing demonstrated a number of problems, notably a lack of horizontal stability, an underpowered trim system, landing gear that could be extended only at slow speeds, an unreliable airspeed indicator, and a cramped cockpit. The test pilots also requested that six guns be installed. The stability problem was addressed on the second prototype by adding a triangular fillet to the front of the vertical stabilizer. The extra guns could not be incorporated due to weight and balance considerations.

=== Production ===
The Navy placed a production contract for 2,023 aircraft based on the second prototype on 6 October 1944. On 5 February 1945, they awarded another contract for 1,876 slightly modified aircraft from General Motors' Eastern Aircraft Division, given the designation F3M-1. These differed primarily in having the R-2800-34W engine and a small increase in fuel capacity.

Deliveries from Grumman began on 21 May 1945. The end of the war led to the Grumman order being reduced to 770 examples, with the GM contract being cancelled outright. An additional order was placed for 126 F8F-1Bs replacing the .50 cal machine guns with the 20 mm M2 cannon, the US version of the widely used Hispano-Suiza HS.404. Fifteen of these were later modified as F8F-1N night fighters with an APS-19 radar mounted under the starboard wing.

An unmodified production F8F-1 set a 1946 time-to-climb record (after a run of 115 ft [35 m]) of 10,000 feet (3,048 m) in 94 seconds (6,383 ft/min [32.43 m/s]). The Bearcat held this record for 10 years until it was broken by a jet fighter (which still could not match the Bearcat's short takeoff distance).

In 1948, Grumman introduced a number of improvements to produce the F8F-2. Among the changes were a modified cowling design, taller vertical fin, and the slightly more powerful R-2800-30W engine producing 2,240 hp (1,670 kW). In total, 293 F8F-2s were produced, along with 12 F8F-2N night fighters and 60 F8F-2P reconnaissance versions. Production ended in 1949, and the first units began to convert off the type that year. The last Bearcats were withdrawn in 1952.

== Operational history ==
=== United States ===
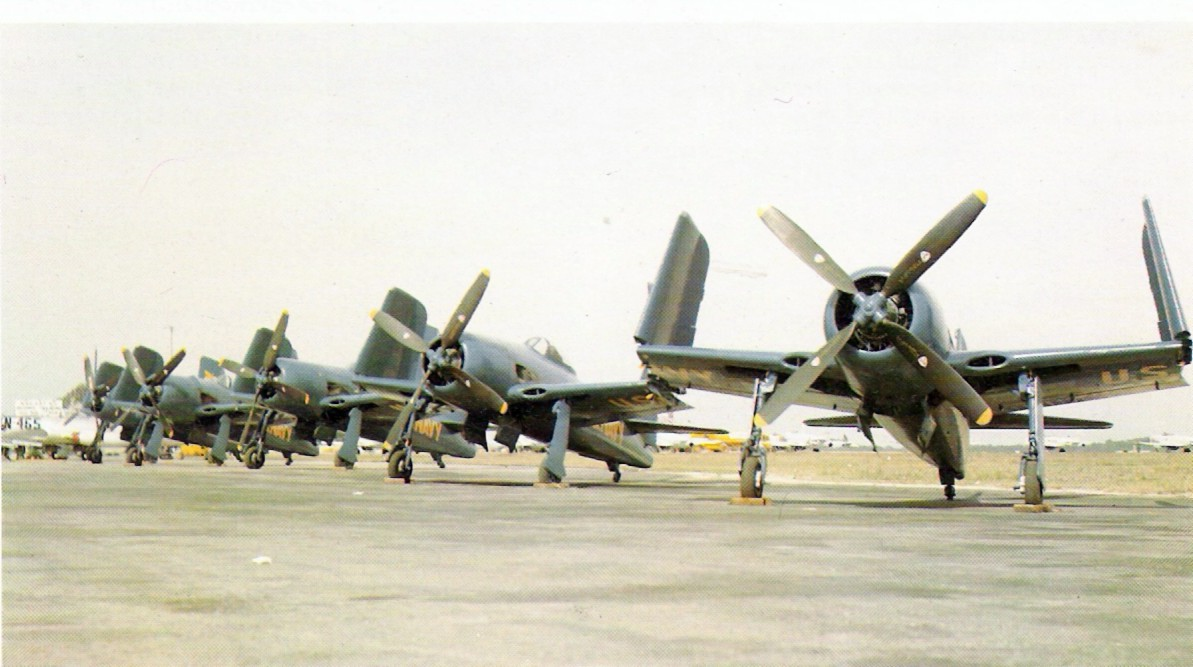
On 25 August 1946, the Blue Angels converted to the Grumman F8F-1 Bearcat and introduced the famous "diamond" formation.

The F8F prototypes were ordered in November 1943 and first flew on 21 August 1944, a mere nine months later. (Note: Grumman's project pilot for the Bearcat series was noted test pilot Corwin F. "Corky" Meyer.) The first production aircraft was delivered in February 1945 and the first squadron, Fighter Squadron 19 (VF-19), was operational by 21 May 1945, but World War II was over before the aircraft saw combat service.

One problem that became evident in service was the snap-off wingtips not working as expected. While they worked well under carefully controlled conditions in flight and on the ground, in the field, where aircraft were repetitively stressed by landing on carriers and since the wings were slightly less carefully made in the factories, a possibility arose that only one wingtip would break away with the possibility of the aircraft crashing. This was replaced with an explosives system to blow the wingtips off together, which also worked well, but this ended when a ground technician died due to an accidental triggering. In the end, the wings were reinforced, and the aircraft was limited to 7.5 g.

Postwar, the F8F became a major U.S. Navy and U.S. Marine Corps fighter, equipping 24 fighter squadrons in the Navy and a smaller number in the Marines. Often mentioned as one of the best-handling, piston-engined fighters ever built, its performance was sufficient to outperform some early jets. (Note: Neil Armstrong flew Bearcats in 1950 during his Navy advanced training, field qualifying in it at age 19. After his retirement, he named the Bearcat as his favorite aircraft to fly.) Its capability for aerobatic performance is illustrated by its selection as the second demonstration aircraft for the Navy's elite Blue Angels flight demonstration squadron in 1946, replacing the Grumman F6F Hellcat. The Blue Angels flew the Bearcat until the team was temporarily disbanded in 1950 during the Korean War and pressed into operational combat service. The Grumman F9F Panther and McDonnell F2H Banshee largely replaced the Bearcat as their performance and other advantages eclipsed piston-engined fighters.

=== France and South Vietnam ===
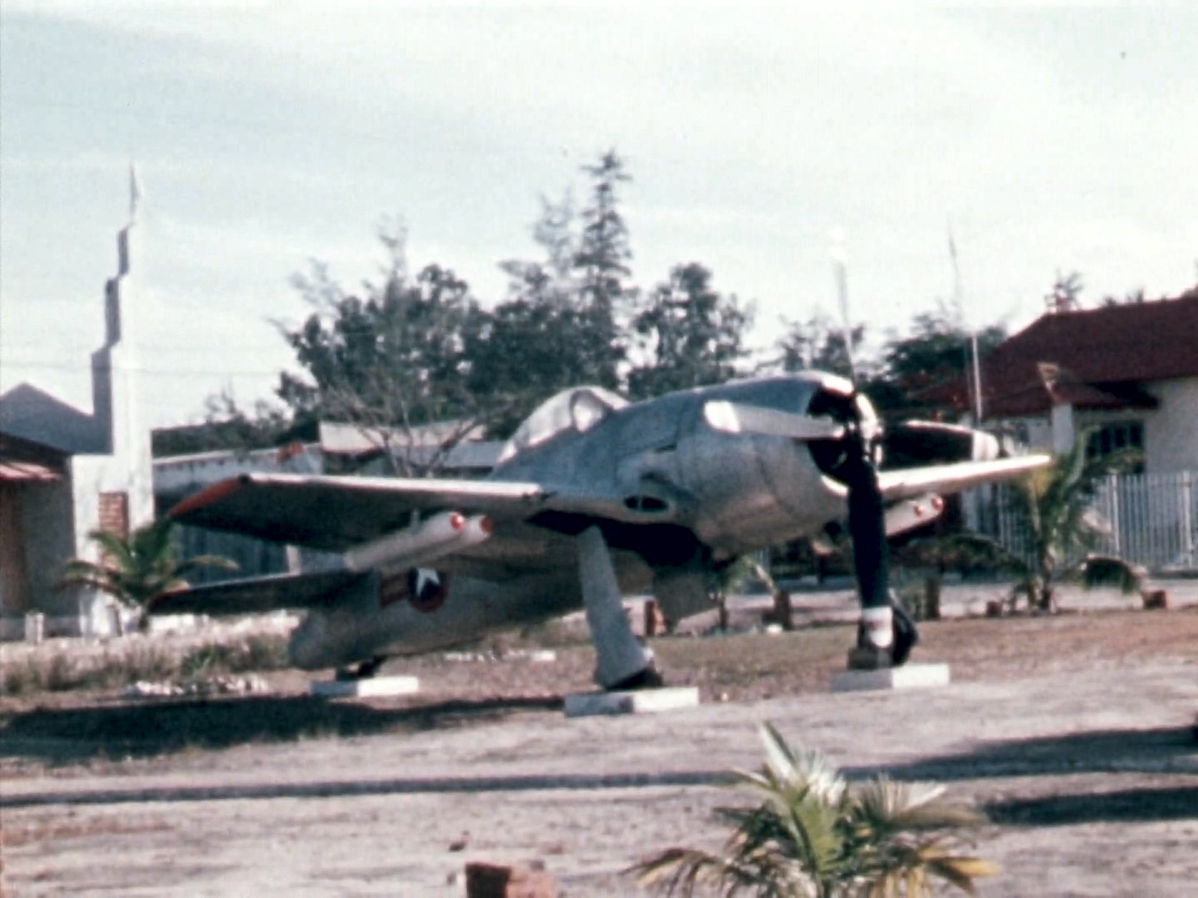
A F8F as a monument at Nha Trang Air Base, Vietnam, 1968

The first combat for the F8F Bearcat was during the French Indochina War (1946–1954), when nearly 200 Bearcats were delivered to the French forces in 1951 as part of the American support for the war. Since the Viet Minh did not have an air force, the French had no need for them as interceptors, and they were used in the ground-support role instead.

When the war ended in 1954 and French forces withdrew, 28 surviving Bearcats were donated to South Vietnam, and served with the Republic of Vietnam Air Force from 1956. The Vietnamese Bearcats were retired from 1960 onwards, replaced with Douglas A-1 Skyraiders and North American T-28 Trojans as the Vietnam War (1955–1975) continued.

=== Thailand ===
The U.S. Navy sold several F8Fs to Thailand during the late 1940s.

== Air racing ==
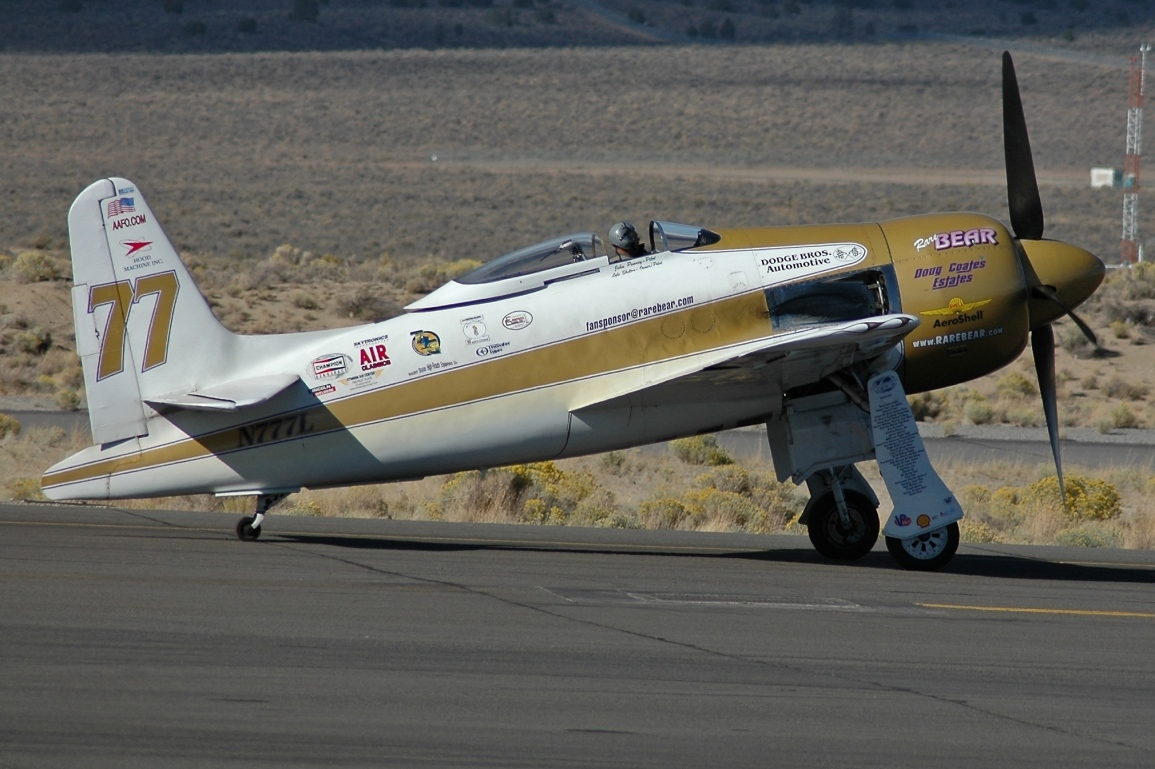
The record-breaking racer Rare Bear

Bearcats have long been popular in air racing. A stock Bearcat flown by Mira Slovak and sponsored by Bill Stead won the first Reno Air Race in 1964. Rare Bear, a highly modified F8F owned by Lyle Shelton, went on to dominate the event for decades, often competing with Daryl Greenamyer, another famous racer with victories in his own Bearcat (Conquest I, now at the Smithsonian's National Air and Space Museum) and holder of a piston-engined aircraft world speed record in it. Rare Bear also set many performance records, including the 3 km World Speed Record for piston-driven aircraft (528.33 mph [850.26 km/h]), set in 1989, and a new time-to-climb record (3,000 metres [9,800 ft] in 91.9 seconds (6,425.9 ft/min [32.644 m/s]), set in 1972, breaking the 1946 record cited above). (Note: Note that Shelton's claim to be the "fastest propeller-driven aircraft in the world" does not acknowledge faster turboprop aircraft such as the Russian Tupolev Tu-95 "Bear" bomber. Other sources credit Rare Bear as the fastest "piston-driven" aircraft.)

== Variants ==
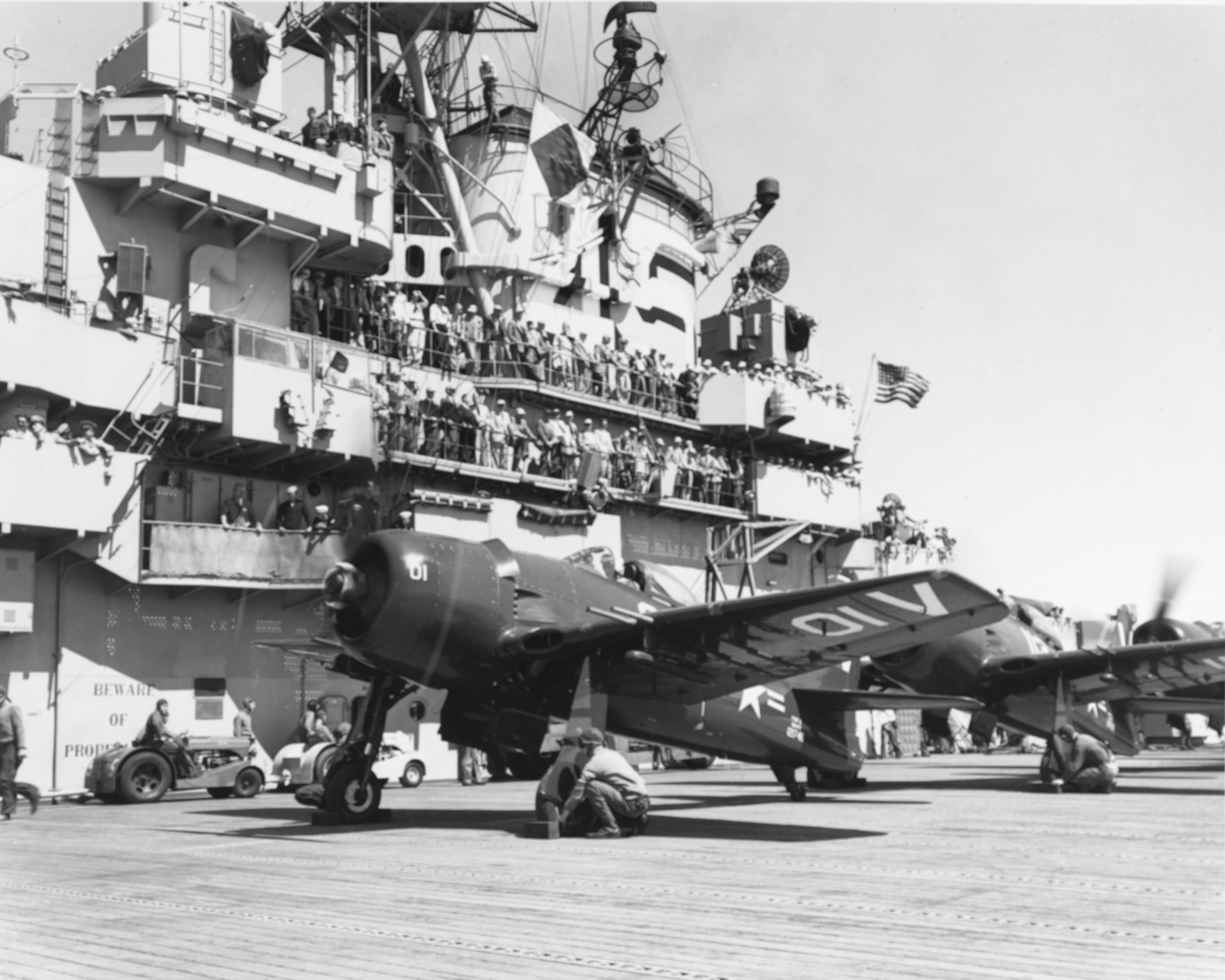
VF-111 F8Fs aboard USS Valley Forge

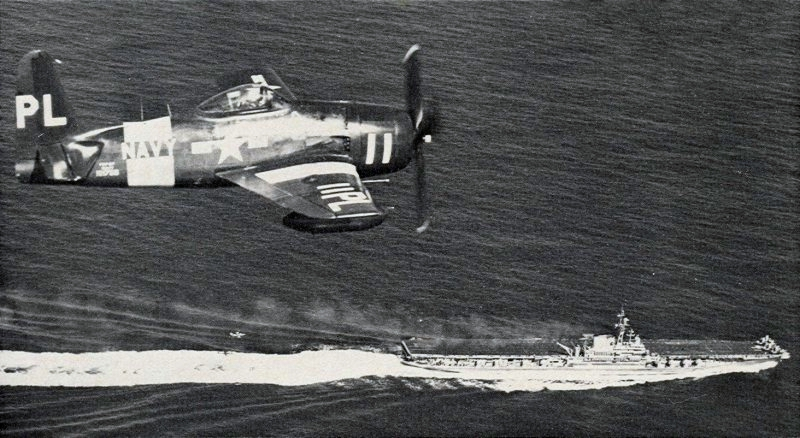
An F8F-2P reconnaissance aircraft from VC-62 over USS Midway, 1949

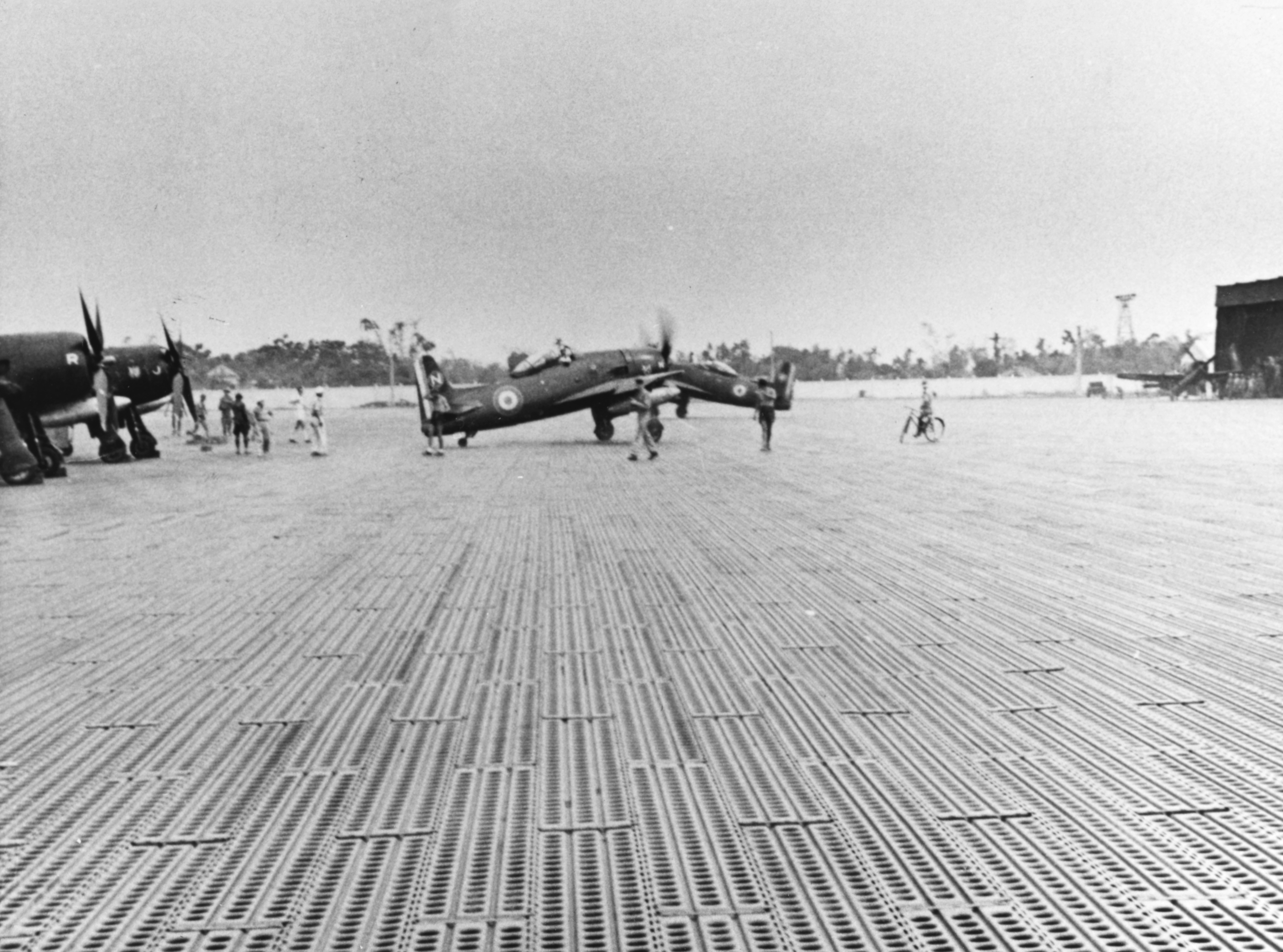
French Bearcats at Tourane Air Base, circa 1954

XF8F-1
Prototype aircraft, two built

F8F-1 Bearcat
Single-seat fighter aircraft, equipped with folding wings, a retractable tailwheel, self-sealing fuel tanks, a very small dorsal fin, powered by a 2,100 hp (1,600 kW) Pratt & Whitney R-2800-34W Double Wasp radial piston engine, armed with four 0.50 in (12.7 mm) machine guns, 658 built

F8F-1B Bearcat
Single-seat fighter version, armed with four AN/M3 20 mm cannons, 100 built

F8F-1C Bearcat
Originally designated F8F-1C, redesignated as F8F-1B, 126 built

F8F-1D
F8F-1s converted into drone control aircraft

F8F-1(D)B Bearcat
Unofficial designation for export version for France and Thailand

F8F-1E Bearcat
F8F-1 night-fighter prototype carrying APS-4 radar

XF8F-1N
F8F-1 conversion into night fighter prototypes

F8F-1N Bearcat
Night fighter version, equipped with an APS-19 radar, 12 built

F8F-1P Bearcat
F8F-1 conversion photo reconnaissance conversion

F3M-1 Bearcat
Planned designation for F8F aircraft constructed by General Motors

F4W-1 Bearcat
Planned designation for F8F aircraft constructed by Canadian Car and Foundry

XF8F-2
F8F-1 conversion with engine upgrade, revised engine cowling, taller tail

F8F-2 Bearcat
Improved version, equipped with a redesigned engine cowling, taller fin and rudder, armed with four 20 mm cannons, powered by a Pratt & Whitney R-2800-30W radial piston engine, 293 built

F8F-2D
F8F-2s converted into drone control aircraft

F8F-2N Bearcat
Night-fighter version, equipped with an APS-19 radar, 12 built

F8F-2P Bearcat
Photo-reconnaissance version, fitted with camera equipment, armed with two 20 mm (0.79 in) cannons, 60 built

G-58A/B
Two civil aircraft: The first was owned by the Gulf Oil Company for the use of Major Alford Williams; the second one was used by Grumman as a demonstrator aircraft and was flown by Roger Wolfe Kahn.

B.Kh.15
(Thai: บ.ข.๑๕) Royal Thai Air Force designation for the F8F-1.

== Operators ==
France

- French Air Force

Thailand

- Royal Thai Air Force

United States

- United States Navy
- United States Marine Corps

South Vietnam

- Republic of Vietnam Air Force

== Surviving aircraft ==
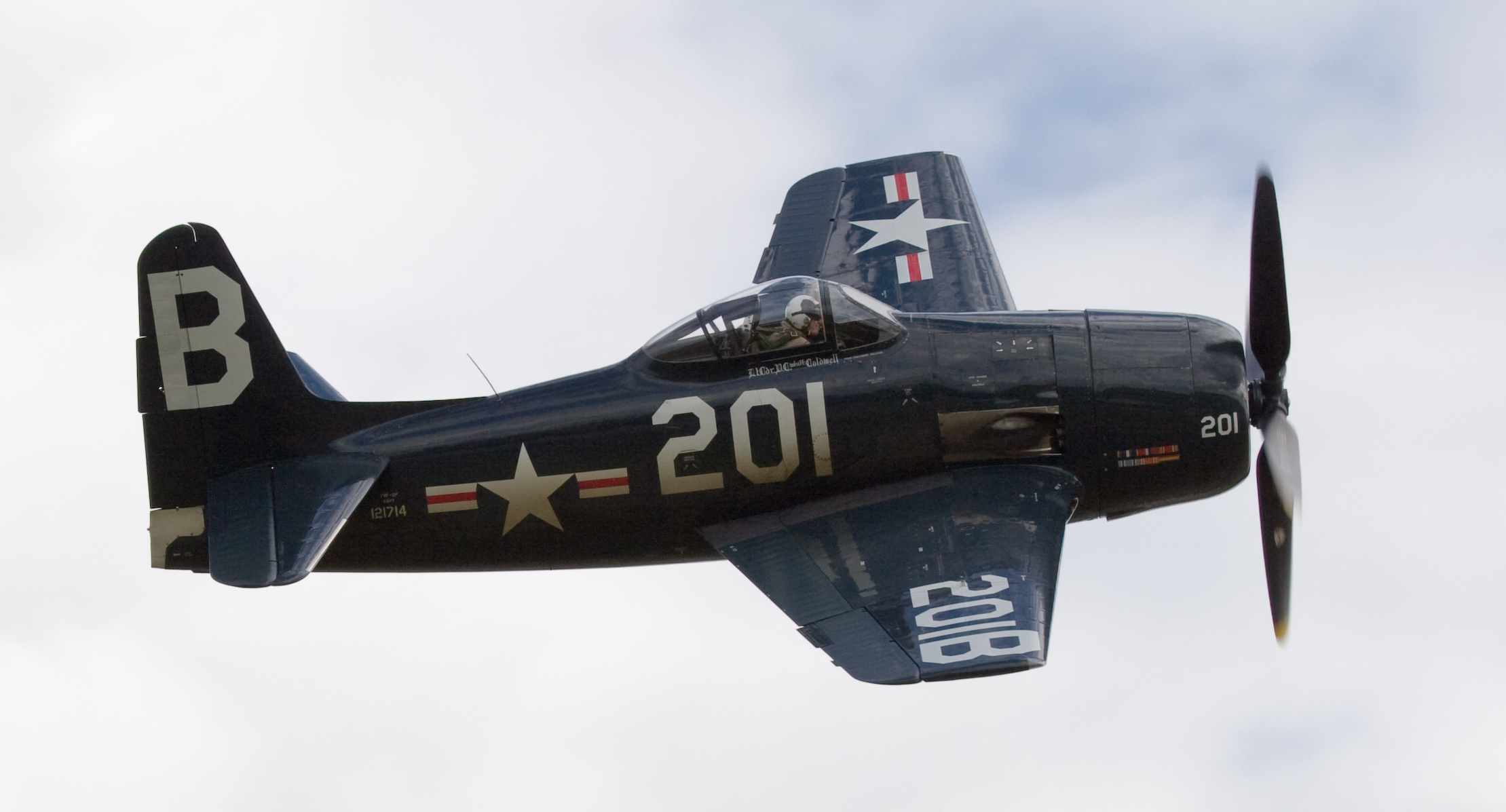
Grumman F8F-2P Bearcat G-RUMM N700HL at Flying Legends, Duxford, UK

=== Thailand ===
Airworthy

F8F-1

- 122120 – Tango Squadron, Foundation for the Preservation and Development of Thai Aircraft.

On display

F8F-1

- 94956 – Royal Thai Air Force Museum in Bangkok.

=== United Kingdom ===
Airworthy

F8F-2P

- 121714 – The Fighter Collection, Duxford.

=== United States ===
Airworthy

F8F-1

- 90454 – privately owned in Fountain Hills, Arizona.
- 95255 – based at Lewis Air Legends in San Antonio, Texas.

F8F-1B

- 122095 – privately owned in Indianapolis, Indiana.

F8F-2

- 121748 – privately owned in Houston, Texas.
- 121752 – based at Erickson Aircraft Collection in Madras, Oregon.
- 121776 – privately owned in Wilmington, Delaware.
- 122614 – based at Lewis Air Legends in San Antonio, Texas.
- 122619 – based at Lewis Air Legends in San Antonio, Texas.
- 122629 – based at Lewis Air Legends in San Antonio, Texas.
- 122637 – privately owned in Houston, Texas.

G-58 Gulfhawk (two civilian built Bearcats)

- G-58A – based at the Planes of Fame Air Museum in Chino, California.
- G-58B – based at Palm Springs Air Museum in Palm Springs, California.

On display

F8F-2

- 121646 Conquest I – Steven F. Udvar-Hazy Center of the National Air and Space Museum in Chantilly, Virginia.

F8F-2P

- 121710 – National Naval Aviation Museum at NAS Pensacola, Florida.

Under Restoration

F8F-1

- 95356 – to airworthiness by private owner in Bentonville, Arkansas.

F8F-2

- 121679 – to airworthiness by private owner in Livermore, California.
- 122674 – overhaul to airworthiness by Commemorative Air Force (Southern California Wing) in Camarillo, California.

== Specifications (F8F-2) ==
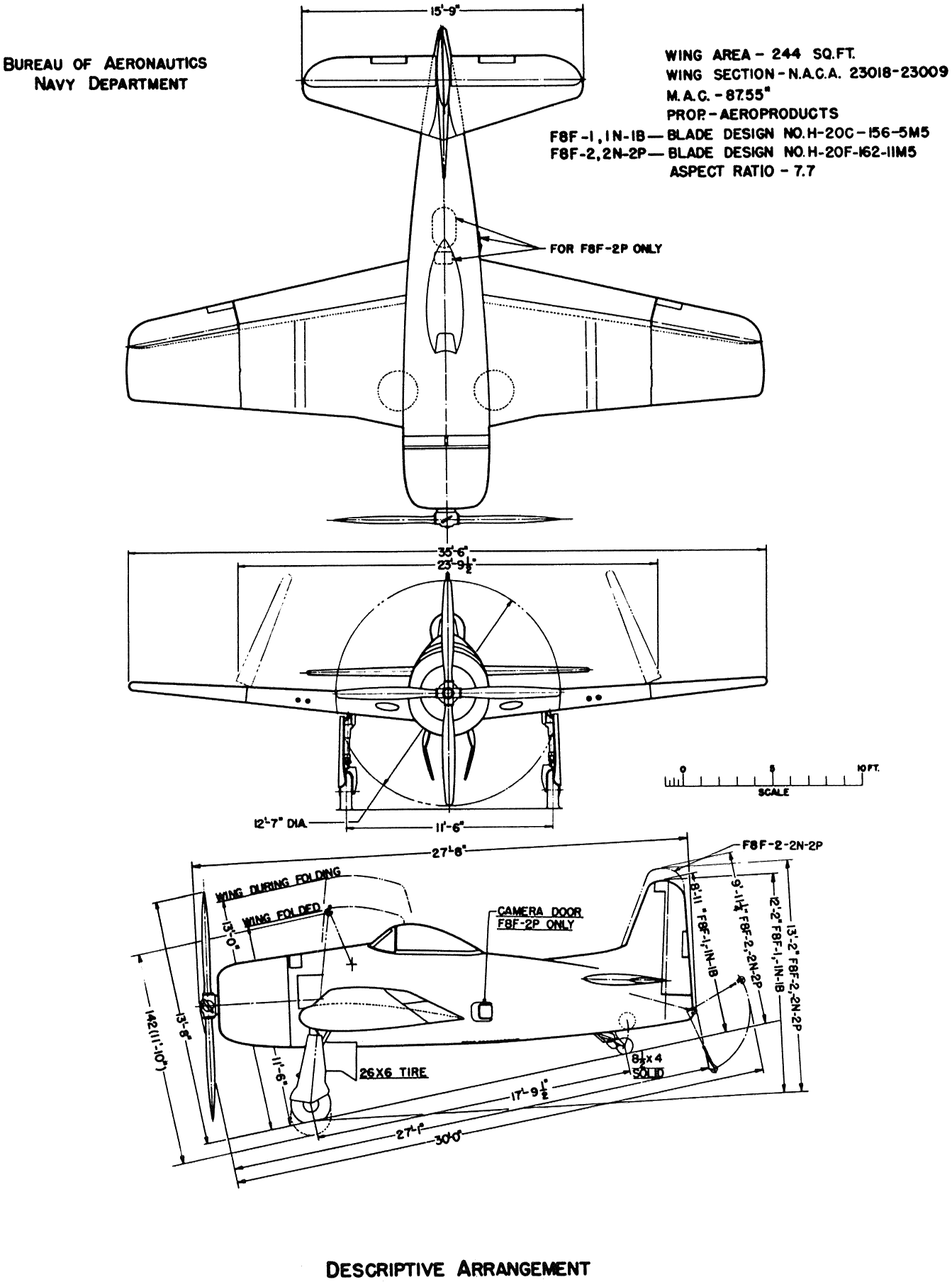
3-view line drawing of the Grumman F8F-2 Bearcat

Data from F8F Bearcat in Action

General characteristics

- Crew: 1
- Length: 28 ft 3 in (8.61 m)
- Wingspan: 35 ft 10 in (10.92 m)
- Height: 13 ft 10 in (4.22 m)
- Wing area: 244 sq ft (22.7 m^{2})
- Aspect ratio: 5.02
- Airfoil: root: NACA 23018; tip: NACA 23009
- Empty weight: 7,650 lb (3,470 kg)
- Max takeoff weight: 13,460 lb (6,105 kg)
- Powerplant: 1 × Pratt & Whitney R-2800-30W Double Wasp 18-cylinder air-cooled radial piston engine, 2,250 hp (1,680 kW) for takeoff; 2,500 hp (1,864 kW) combat power at sea level
- Propellers: 4-bladed Aeroproducts constant-speed propeller, 12 ft 7 in (3.84 m) diameter

Performance

- Maximum speed: 455 mph (732 km/h, 395 kn)
- Stall speed: 95.1 mph (153.0 km/h, 82.6 kn) power off, at 11,428 lb (5,184 kg) in the fighter loading condition with one 150 US gal (570 L) drop tank
- Range: 1,105 mi (1,778 km, 960 nmi)
- Service ceiling: 40,800 ft (12,400 m)
- Rate of climb: 4,465 ft/min (22.68 m/s)
- Wing loading: 42 lb/sq ft (210 kg/m^{2})
- Power/mass: 0.22 hp/lb (0.36 kW/kg)

Armament

- Guns: 4 × 20 mm (.79 in) AN/M3 cannon
- Rockets: 4 × 5 in (127 mm) HVAR unguided rockets
- Bombs: 1,000 lb (454 kg) bombs

== See also ==
Related development

- Grumman F6F Hellcat

Aircraft of comparable role, configuration, and era

- Focke-Wulf Ta 152
- Hawker Sea Fury
- Supermarine Seafang
- Mitsubishi A7M
- Nakajima Ki-84
- Vought F4U Corsair
- Boeing XF8B

Related lists

- List of fighter aircraft
- List of aircraft of World War II
- List of United States Navy aircraft designations (pre-1962)
- List of military aircraft of the United States
- List of United States naval aircraft
