= Lock On: Modern Air Combat =

2003 video game

- European cover art
- Developer: Eagle Dynamics
- Publishers: EU: Ubi Soft; RU: 1C Company
- Director: Nick Grey
- Release: EU: November 20, 2003; RU: November 21, 2003
- Genre: Air combat simulation
- Modes: Single-player, multiplayer

Lock On: Modern Air Combat or LOMAC, known in Russia as LockOn: Современная боевая авиация, is a modern combat flight simulator developed by Eagle Dynamics and published by Ubisoft in Europe and 1C Company in Russia. It is a continuation of the Flanker series.

The series spawned the Flaming Cliffs series of aircraft modules for Digital Combat Simulator.

== Gameplay ==
Lock On is a survey sim originally featuring a selection of playable American and Soviet aircraft:

- A-10A
- F-15C
- MiG-29
- Su-25
- Su-27
- Su-33

The game features both air-to-air and air-to-ground combat including combat air patrol, dogfighting, airstrikes, close air support, SEAD and anti-surface warfare. It simulates takeoff and landing including carrier operations with the Su-33 and Kuznetsov-class carrier. Over 40 non-playable AI airplanes are present including support from AWACS aircraft and refueling tankers.

== Flaming Cliffs ==
=== Flaming Cliffs (2005) ===
Lock On: Flaming Cliffs is a continuation of Lock On: Modern Air Combat. It adds additional content including a playable Su-25T, new missions and updated textures. Three singleplayer campaigns are included. Flaming Cliffs and Hot Wind are set in mountainous Abkhazia, depicting a flashpoint involving NATO, Georgia, Russia and local insurgent forces. Last Ditch depicts a conflict between Russia and Crimean separatists supported by NATO.

=== Flaming Cliffs 2 (2010) ===
Lock On: Flaming Cliffs 2 is a further evolution of Lock On: Flaming Cliffs. All of the player-controlled aircraft have been transferred to the virtual environment created for the Digital Combat Simulator series. It features a new GUI and mission editor. AI flight models, gun ballistics, 3D models and sound are improved. Flaming Cliffs 2 is network-compatible with DCS: Black Shark.

=== Flaming Cliffs 3 (2012) ===
Flaming Cliffs 3 was released as a DCS World module, porting all flyable aircraft into the DCS World game client.

=== Flaming Cliffs 2024 ===
Flaming Cliffs 2024 was released in July 2024, expanding the collection of aircraft to include the F-86, MiG-15 and F-5. All Flaming Cliffs aircraft received free graphic updates that same year. The new aircraft were adapted from work created for another Eagle Dynamics product, Modern Air Combat, which was "shelved" earlier in 2024.

== Reception ==
The editors of Computer Gaming World nominated Lock On: Modern Air Combat for their 2003 "Flight Simulation of the Year" award, which ultimately went to Flight Simulator 2004: A Century of Flight.
