= Flying Legends =

Annual air show at Duxford Aerodrome, England

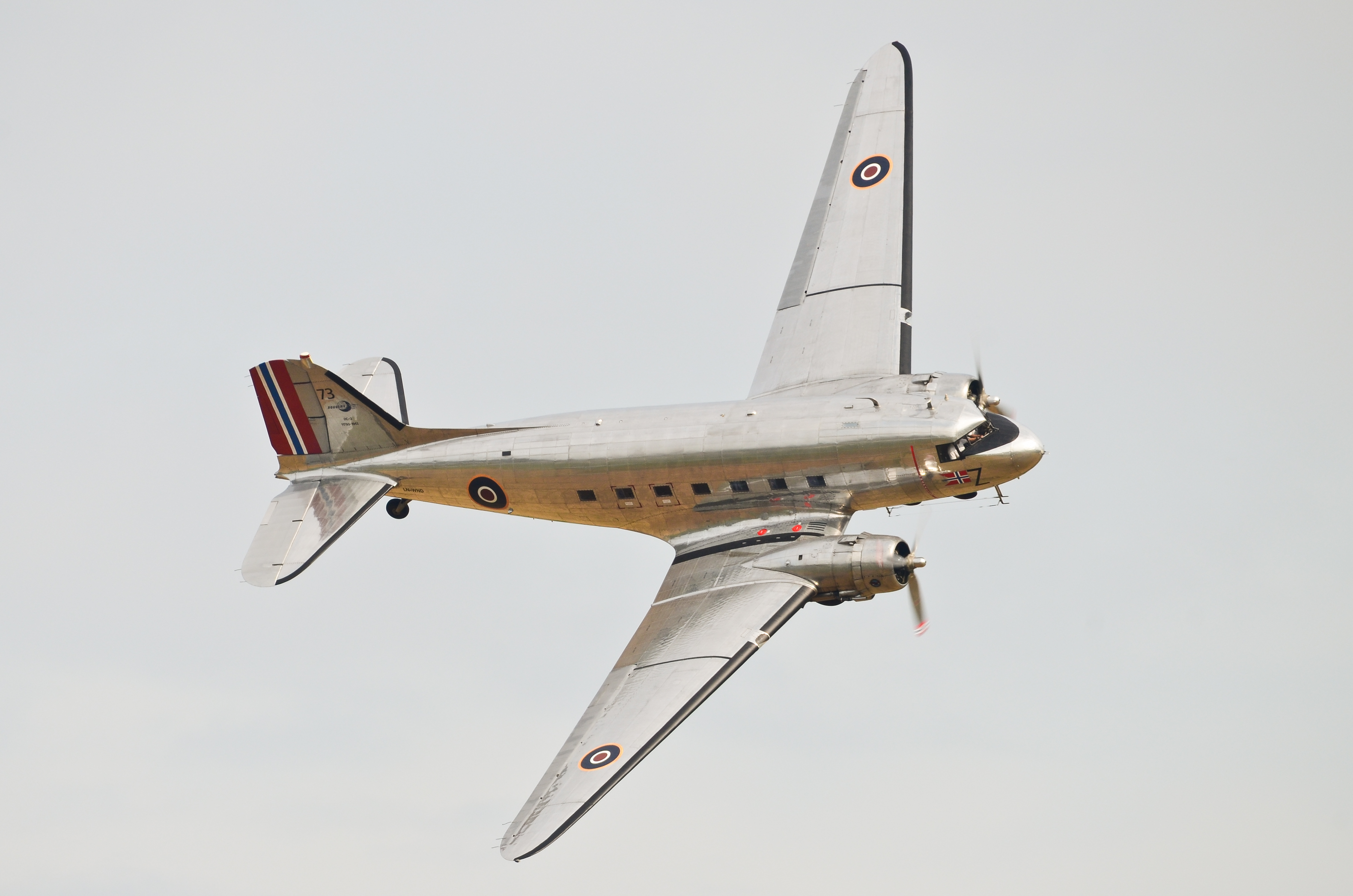
- Restored Douglas C-47 Skytrain, Flying Legends 2014
- Status: Dormant
- Genre: Air show
- Dates: July
- Frequency: Annual
- Locations: Leeds East Airport, North Yorkshire
- Country: U.K.
- Website: http://www.flyinglegends.com/

Flying Legends was a two-day airshow in England, originally held in July every year. The airshow featured only warbird and vintage aircraft, such as the Supermarine Spitfire, North American P-51 Mustang and Boeing B-17 Flying Fortress Sally B. It was run by The Fighter Collection, based at Duxford Aerodrome, Cambridgeshire, formerly RAF Duxford.

The event took place for some 30 years at Duxford Aerodrome until July 2019, but due to various factors including the COVID-19 pandemic, and business disagreements between Flying Legends and the airfield owner Imperial War Museum, the 2020 event was cancelled. The event planned to move to Sywell Aerodrome in Northamptonshire for 2021, but this too was cancelled.

The Flying Legends airshow re-commenced in 2023, this time at a new venue at Leeds East Airport (formerly RAF Church Fenton) in North Yorkshire, taking place on 15th and 16 July 2023. The proposed event for 2024 was also cancelled.
