= The Fighter Collection =

Collection of airworthy vintage military aircraft

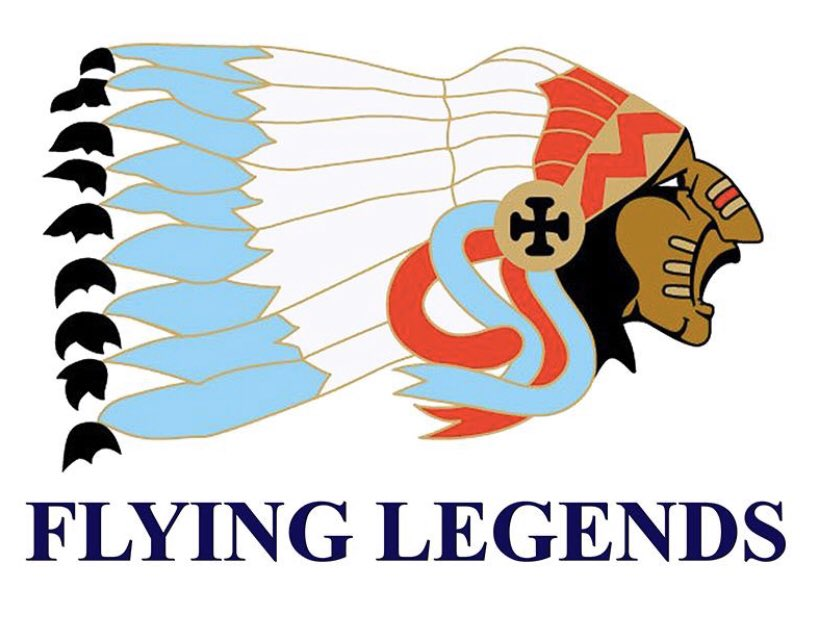
- Type: Private
- Industry: SIC 91030 - Operation of historical sites and buildings and similar visitor attractions
- Founded: 19 December 1985; 40 years ago (Date of Incorporation)
- Founder: Stephen Grey
- Headquarters: Duxford, Cambridgeshire, United Kingdom
- Brands: Flying Legends

The Fighter Collection is a private operator of airworthy vintage military aircraft or warbirds. It is based in the United Kingdom at Duxford Aerodrome in Cambridgeshire, an airfield that is owned by the Imperial War Museum and is also the site of the Imperial War Museum Duxford. The Fighter Collection is registered as a private limited company.

The Fighter Collection was founded by Stephen Grey, a businessman and former RAF pilot who was actively involved with the company until his retirement in 2013. The company is now owned by his son, Nick Grey. The aircraft are stored and maintained in Hangar 2 at Duxford Aerodrome; the hangar is accessible to visitors of the Imperial War Museum.

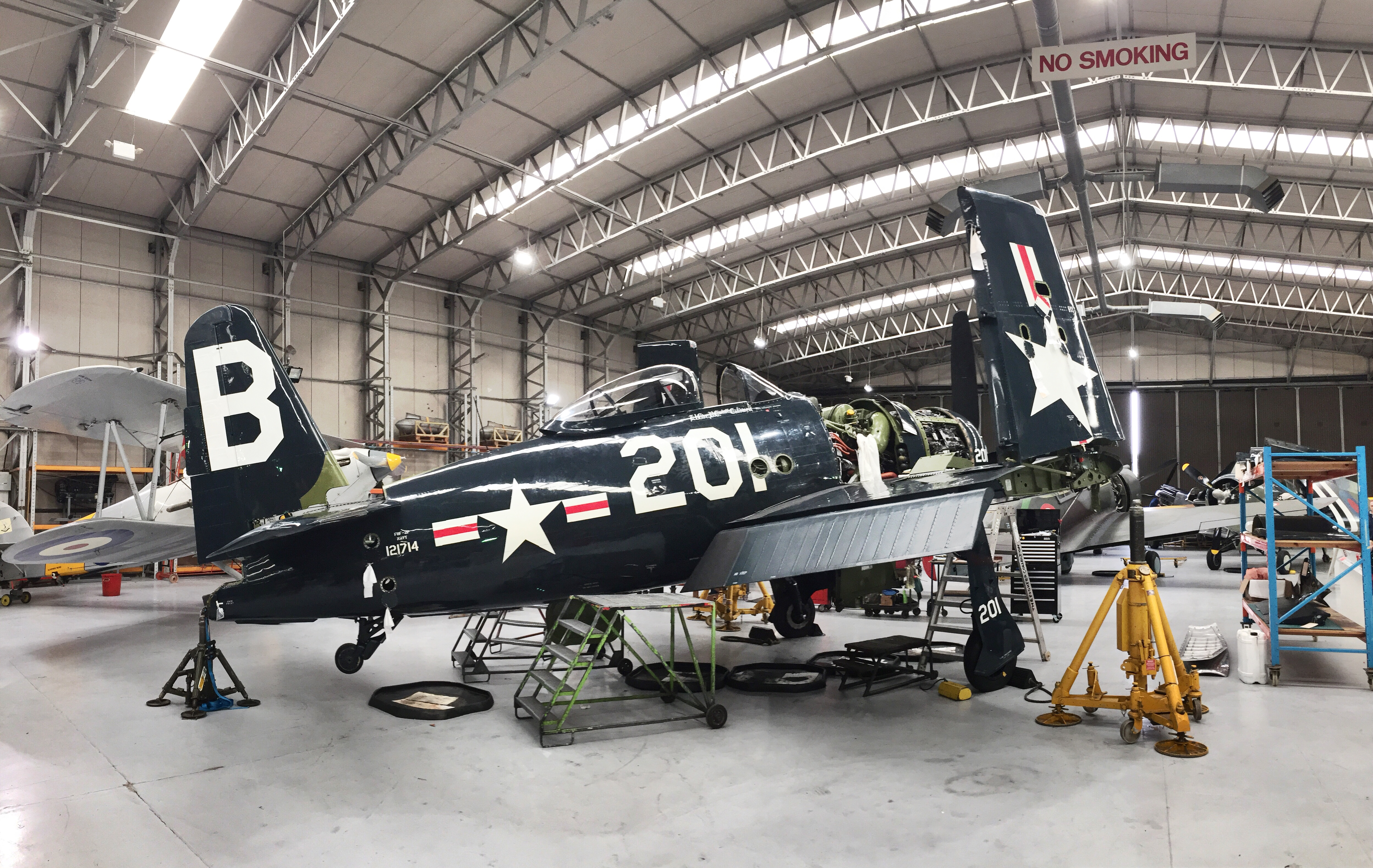
Some of the aircraft of the Fighter Collection in their hangar at Duxford Aerodrome, April 2017

== Flying Legends ==
Flying Legends is an annual two-day airshow organized by The Fighter Collection, originally held every year at the beginning of July. The 2013 airshow saw the celebration of the event's 20th anniversary. Following the cancellation of the airshows in 2020, 2021 & 2022, the event moved from its long-standing former home at Duxford Aerodrome to RAF Church Fenton in North Yorkshire for July 2023 but was cancelled again in 2024 and since.

== Aircraft ==
These aircraft are owned by The Fighter Collection as of 2015. The operator occasionally adds new aircraft to its collection, and occasionally sells aircraft to other parties.

Type	Image	Identity	Date	Markings/Notes
Beechcraft D17S Staggerwing		G-BRVE	1945	Flown during World War II by the Royal Navy as Traveller Mk.I FT475. Allocated to the United States Navy post-war before being sold into civilian ownership. Acquired by the Fighter Collection in 2005.
Bristol Beaufighter		JM135/A19-144 and JL946/A19-148		A composite aircraft built from the parts of two Beaufighters. Under long term restoration to flying condition.
Curtiss Model 75A-1 Hawk		82/X881 (G-CCVH)		Issued to the French French Air Force 1939. It was later flown in combat against the British and Americans by the Vichy French Air Force. Post-war it served as a trainer until the 1950s; it was acquired by the Fighter Collection in 1995. It carries the markings of 1ére Escadrille, Groupe de Combat 11/5 Lafayette, the unit that operated it in 1939.
Curtiss P-36C		38-210 (NX80FR)	1939	This P-36 is the only flying example of its type. It saw some World War II service in the United States before being allocated to a technical school. Post-war, it passed through several private owners before being acquired by the Fighter Collection and restored.
Curtiss P-40C Warhawk		41-13357 (G-CIIO)		After a period of US Army Air Force service, this aircraft was sent to the Soviet Union in 1941. Little is known of its history there until the 1990s, when it was one of two Warhawks recovered from the former Soviet Union by The Fighter Collection. It was restored in the United States, taking its first post-restoration flight in 2011.
Curtiss P-40F Warhawk		41-19841 (G-CGZP)	1942	Operated by the 347th Fighter Group in the Solomon Islands in 1942, it was recovered from a dump on the island of Espiritu Santo in the 1970s. Restored to airworthy condition, it has been flying since 2011. As the aircraft's exact wartime history is unknown, it is painted to represent Lee's Hope, a Warhawk based in Italy in 1944.
Fiat J 11		Fv.2542 (G-CBLS)		This Swedish Air force aircraft is one of only four survivors of its type. It was lost in 1942 in a crash that killed its pilot on Tärnatjåkko, a mountain in the north of Sweden. It was recovered from the crash site in 1983 and was acquired by the Fighter Collection in 1995. It has since been undergoing restoration to flying condition. Although a Swedish aircraft, it is painted to represent one from the Italian air force.
Gloster Gladiator		N5903 (G-GLAD)	1939	Flown briefly by 141 Squadron, but spent much of World War II in storage. After a period of private ownership, and some years as a static exhibit at the Fleet Air Arm Museum it was bought by the Fighter Collection from the Shuttleworth Collection in 1994 and restored to flying condition, taking its first post-restoration flight in 2007. It was painted in the pre-World War II markings of No. 72 Squadron RAF.
Goodyear FG-1D Corsair		88297 (G-FGID)		A version of the Vought F4U Corsair, built under license by Goodyear Aircraft, this aircraft served in the US Navy between 1945 and 1959; this included wartime service in Guam and the Philippines. It was then sold to a smelting company, however instead of scrapping it, the company sold it to the movie stunt pilot Frank Tallman. It joined the Fighter Collection in 1985 and is currently painted in the December 1945 markings of an aircraft of 1850 Naval Air Squadron, serving on HMS Vengeance of the British Pacific Fleet.
Grumman F4F Wildcat		G-RUMW		This aircraft was accepted by the US Navy in 1945 but was immediately put in storage until its disposal in 1946. It had several private owners and spent nearly two decades as a static, museum exhibit before being restored to flying condition in the early 1990s. It is painted to represent a Fleet Air Arm Wildcat.
Grumman Bearcat		121714 (G-RUMM)	1948	Served with the US Navy until 1957. It then passed through the hands of several owners, including a period of being in the collection of the Planes of Fame Air Museum. It was bought by the Fighter Collection in 1981.
Hawker Fury		K5674 (G-CBZP)	1935	
Hawker Sea Fury FB.11		VX653 (G-BUCM)	1949	Served in the Royal Navy until 1960. It was put on display in the RAF Museum in 1972, then transferred to the Fighter Collection in 1991. Currently it is awaiting restoration.
Hawker Sea Fury T20		WG-655	1951	Formerly owned by the Royal Naval Historic Flight. On 4 August 2020, a main engine bearing failed causing the engine to seize. The pilot had declared an emergency and attempted to return to Duxford when the engine began showing signs of trouble. But the engine stopped a minute later and he was forced to land in a field. Both the pilot and passenger (a journalist who was also a pilot) suffered broken vertebrae. The aircraft was declared a write-off.
Hawker Nimrod		S1581 (G-BWWK)		Flown from the aircraft carrier HMS Glorious by No. 408 (Fleet Fighter) Flight RAF until being written off in 1938. It was discovered in a scrapyard in the 1970s and restored to airworthiness in the 1990s, taking its first post-restoration flight in 2000. It joined the Fighter Collection in 2004. It is currently painted in the markings it carried when serving operationally in the 1930s.
Noorduyn Mk.IIb Harvard		FE695 (G-BTXI)	1942	A version of the North American T-6 Texan that was built by Noorduyn Aviation in Montreal, Quebec. It served as a trainer with the RCAF, and then the Swedish Air Force until 1972. It joined The Fighter Collection in 1990.
Supermarine Spitfire Mk Vb		EP120 (G-LFVB)		Assigned to No. 501 Squadron RAF in 1942, and then subsequently RCAF 402 Squadron. This aircraft destroyed seven German aircraft during its wartime career. Post-war, it was an instructional airframe, then displayed as a gate guardian. It was acquired by The Fighter Collection in 1993 and restored to airworthiness. It is currently painted in its 402 Squadron markings.
Supermarine Spitfire LF Mk XIV		MV-293 (G-SPIT)	1944	Built by Vickers Armstrong and sent to India in 1945. After service with the Indian Air Force, it was returned to the United Kingdom in the 1970s; restoration was completed in 1992. In 2000 it was painted to represent MV268, an aircraft flown by Johnnie Johnson towards the end of World War II.
Supermarine Spitfire Mk. 22		PK624	1945	This aircraft served in the late 1940s with 614 Squadron. Between 1964 and 1989 it was a gate guardian at a number of sites. In 1994 it was acquired by The Fighter Collection from the Ministry of Defence. It has since been undergoing restoration to eventual flying condition (Photograph taken in 1986).

== See also ==
- The Shuttleworth Collection
