= Trek to Yomi =

- Developer: Flying Wild Hog
- Publisher: Devolver Digital
- Directors: Leonard Menchiari; Marcin Kryszpin
- Producers: Mirosław Baran; Katarzyna Szymczak-Skalska; Agnieszka Ratajczak
- Designer: Kamil Bujnicki
- Programmer: Arkadiusz Sito
- Artist: Grzegorz Szczygieł
- Writers: Jakub Sowa; Leonard Menchiari; Araceli Garcia; Alec Meer
- Composers: Cody Matthew Johnson; Yoko Honda
- Engine: Unreal Engine 4
- Platforms: PlayStation 4; PlayStation 5; Windows; Xbox One; Xbox Series X/S; Nintendo Switch
- Release: PC, PS4, PS5, XBO, XSX/S; May 5, 2022; NS; January 30, 2023
- Genre: Action-adventure
- Mode: Single-player

Trek to Yomi is a 2022 side-scrolling action-adventure game developed by Flying Wild Hog and published by Devolver Digital. Set during the Edo period of feudal Japan, the game follows a young swordsman named Hiroki who embarks on a quest of vengeance when his home village is burned, leading him to enter Yomi, the Japanese underworld, and confront the evils of his past. The game was released for PlayStation 4, PlayStation 5, Windows, Xbox One, and Xbox Series X/S in May 2022, followed by a Nintendo Switch port in January 2023. It received mixed reviews from critics.

== Gameplay ==
Trek to Yomi is a 2D side-scrolling game with a black and white color scheme.

Trek to Yomi is a side-scrolling action-adventure game. There are two modes of melee attack; light attacks are fast but weak, and heavy attacks are slow but strong. A well-timed block will break an enemy guard, giving players an opportunity to counter-attack.

Melee attacks can be combined with directional movements for actions such as thrusting a sword forward or turning deftly to slash enemies attacking from behind. Players need to observe the combat stance of their opponents and react accordingly. For instance, the player should stab an enemy by thrusting forward if their opponent is prepared to block the player's attack by holding their sword horizontally. The player character primarily fights with a katana. New weapons such as ozutsu, bo-shurikens, and ranged weapons such as bows and arrows unlock as the player progresses in the game. While the game is set in the Edo period, it also features bosses, mythological creatures and other supernatural elements. The player can also occasionally use various environmental hazards to kill their opponents, avoiding direct combat altogether.

Gameplay regularly alternates between freeform exploration and side-scrolling combat sessions that utilize a fixed camera. While the game is mostly a linear experience, its world features secret areas where players can find additional health and stamina upgrades, as well as bonus tools and weapons. They would also discover shrines which replenish the player's health and stamina. Each shrine, however, can only be used once in a playthrough. The player may also encounter other friendly non-playable characters who may give them clues as to where to go next. While the game is designed to be a challenging experience, it also features a cinematic mode which lowers the game's difficulty level. Once the player completes the game once, they will unlock an extra difficulty mode in which the player character would die immediately when they are hit.

== Plot ==
Young Hiroki is training with his master Sanjuro, when they receive word that their village has come under attack by bandits. Sanjuro orders Hiroki to stay as he leaves to fight. However, Sanjuro's daughter Aiko encourages Hiroki to help her father. Cutting his way through the bandits, Hiroki is then challenged by a tattooed outlaw named Kaguro. Hiroki wounds him but is defeated. Sanjuro rushes to help and slays Kaguro but is mortally wounded. Before he dies, he has Hiroki swear to him that he will always protect Aiko and the village in this life and beyond.

Years later, Hiroki is a samurai and betrothed to Aiko, now the village chief. They learn that a warlord has raided a neighboring village under their protection. Hiroki's men are ambushed and captured when they set out to help. Hiroki pursues them to the burning village but is helpless to save them from being put to death. After defeating the enemy commander, he reveals that the attack was diversion so the warlord could attack Aiko's village. Hiroki rushes back to find the village on fire. He confronts the warlord, who is revealed to be a disfigured Kaguro. He tells Hiroki that Aiko is dead before killing him.

Hiroki's soul falls to Yomi where he chases after a spirit that looks like Aiko. When he catches up to the spirit, it transforms into a banshee. Hiroki subdues it, and the banshee becomes calm and reverts to Aiko. Aiko tells Hiroki that he cannot save her but that he can save her people from Kaguro. However, to escape from Yomi, he must descend further and prove himself worthy of resurrection.

Hiroki faces several trials, including the now twisted spirits of his own men, and defeats the wretched soul of Sanjuro. Having overcome his guilt for past failures, his final test is a demon in his form representing his own evil desires. After defeating it, the demon asks Hiroki what his true path is. After answering, he is granted the right of resurrection and confronts Kaguro. Kaguro explains that he did in fact die and passed the trials of Yomi, stealing the power of the spirits for himself. Once Kaguro is slain for good, one of three endings is triggered.

If you choose Love, Hiroki will hear Aiko calling him back to Yomi and he returns to spend eternity with her. If you choose Duty, Hiroki renounces his love for Aiko and becomes the new village chief, training a new apprentice similar to how Sanjuro trained him. If you choose Hatred, Hiroki takes Kaguro's armor and his place as warlord. A secret fourth ending is unlocked if Kaguro is defeated in Chapter 3, with Hiroki finding Aiko's corpse. In despair, he abandons the village to the warlord's men and is never seen again.

== Development and release ==
The idea for Trek to Yomi emerged when game director Leonard Menchiari was experimenting with black and white imagery using Unreal Engine. Publisher Devolver Digital then approached one of their long-term partners, Polish studio Flying Wild Hog, who was developing Devolverland Expo for the publisher at that time, about a game set in the Edo period. The studio was intrigued by the project and agreed to serve as the game's developer. Devolver Digital then brought Menchiari and Flying Wild Hog together and began the game's production. The game was heavily inspired by classic samurai movies, most notably those directed by Akira Kurosawa, Orochi (1925), and Eiji Yoshikawa's Musashi novel. Menchiari also took inspiration from Sergio Leone's spaghetti Westerns and 1930s movies starring Buster Keaton. Its 2D side-scrolling gameplay was influenced by silent films from the 1920s to 1930s, in which "each scene is designed to look more like a magical moving theatre stage rather than a screen". According to game director Marcin Kryszpin, Trek to Yomi was not designed to be a big game, and that the game should last around five hours.

According to Menchiari, the game's story and themes were focused on two major components: historical Japan and Shinto mythology. (Note: In Shinto mythology, Yomi is the land of the dead.) As the game was set during Edo Japan, the team worked extensively to ensure that the game is historically accurate and authentic. The team consulted Aki Tabei Matsunaga, a Japanese historian who helped the team to translate and stylize the dialogue so that they are period appropriate. The team also used the displays at the Edo-Tokyo Museum as the foundation for the design of various in-game assets. The team collaborated with Emperia Sound and Music and composers Yoko Honda and Cody Matthew Johnson for the game's music. Japanese musical instruments that were found during the Edo period such as taiko drums and shamisen were used to record the game's original soundtracks. A gagaku (traditional Japanese orchestra) were recruited to perform the game's music during the recording process.

Devolver Digital officially announced Trek to Yomi during its showcase at E3 2021. The game was released for PlayStation 4, PlayStation 5, Windows, Xbox One, and Xbox Series X/S on May 5, 2022, with a Nintendo Switch port released on January 30, 2023. It also became available to Xbox Game Pass subscribers at launch.

== Reception ==
Reception

Aggregate score
Aggregator	Score
Metacritic	(PC) 71/100 (PS5) 69/100 (XSXS) 72/100

Review scores
Publication	Score
Destructoid	7/10
Easy Allies	7/10
Electronic Gaming Monthly	3/5
Game Informer	6.75/10
GameRevolution	7/10
GameSpot	5/10
GamesRadar+	3/5
Hardcore Gamer	4/5
HobbyConsolas	80/100
IGN	7/10
Jeuxvideo.com	14/20
PC Gamer (US)	55/100
Push Square	7/10
Shacknews	8/10
The Games Machine (Italy)	8.2/10
The Guardian	3/5
VideoGamer.com	7/10
Pure Xbox	8/10

Trek to Yomi received "mixed or average" reviews from critics, according to review aggregator website Metacritic. Reviewers concluded that while Trek to Yomi excelled in terms of its aesthetics and visuals, its combat, exploration, and narrative were underwhelming.

Zoey Handley of Destructoid gave the game a 7 out of 10, writing, "The gameplay is just overwhelmingly underwhelming. Poor exploration, unimpressive combat, and a merely passable narrative can't be made up for by aesthetics. Which is too bad, because the aesthetics are terrific." Michael Goroff of Electronic Gaming Monthly commended the game's visual presentation, saying, "It's a beautiful game, crammed full of detailed backgrounds, dynamic camera angles, and lighting that understands how to make the most out of a black-and-white color scheme...What makes Trek to Yomi so visually striking is how its various camera angles give you the sense that you're looking at a living diorama." Jill Grodt Game Informer wrote that the tedious gameplay loop and visuals were reminiscent of a "...PlayStation 2-era game, with all of the faults and little of the nostalgia." Jason Faulkner of GameRevolution likened the game to a Kurosawa film while praising the game's grayscale visuals and music, but criticized its lack of character, writing, "...Trek to Yomi [is] missing a lot of the human element that made films like Yojimbo so endearing to audiences...Trek to Yomi is a Kurosawa film with all the close-ups and choreography removed, leaving only the pretty wide-angle shots to sate viewers." Richard Wakeling of GameSpot similarly praised the inspiration Trek to Yomi drew from Kurosawa films, calling it "an excellent homage" with its use of weather effects, fluid camerawork, and framing of monotone visuals, concluding, "The faults of its gameplay are especially disappointing given that Trek to Yomi is such a gorgeous and spellbinding game to look at." Jon Bailes of GamesRadar+ similarly lauded the game's unique aesthetic but unfavorably compared the title to Sifu due to its repetitive, shallow, and unengaging combat.

Travis Northup of IGN criticized the game's side quests and puzzles, deeming them filler while writing, "It's just too bad these ideas weren't taken a little further as it's currently all incredibly straightforward and opportunities for environmental kills almost never come up." George Yang of PC Gamer panned the inconsistent and janky combat, stating, "The controls and wooden animation just can't live up to the fluidity of the film duels Trek to Yomi so badly wants to emulate." Robert Ramsey of Push Square gave the game 7 stars out of 10, concluding, "Trek to Yomi is a decent samurai action game, elevated greatly by its superb presentation. Clocking in at only a few hours, this is a brief but ultimately satisfying tale, stitched together by some simple but very effective environmental design, and a combat system that rewards careful play." Ozzie Mejia of Shacknews praised the unique presentation, crisp swordplay, and abundance of checkpoints and recommended the game to fans of Kurosawa films.
