= Ozutsu =

Ozutsu (means "big pipe" literally) may refer to:

== People ==
- Ōzutsu Man'emon (大砲 万右衛門; 1869–1918), Japanese sumo wrestler, the 18th Yokozuna
- Ōzutsu Takeshi (巨砲 丈士; born 1956), Japanese sumo wrestler

== Others ==
- Ōzutsu（大筒）, a 16th-century Japanese term referring to Japanese artillery
