= Shadow Warrior (2013 video game) =

First-person shooter

- Developer: Flying Wild Hog
- Publisher: Devolver Digital
- Director: Michał Szustak
- Designer: Michał Mazur
- Artists: Paweł Libiszewski; Łukasz Zdunowski
- Writer: Jan Bartkowicz
- Composers: Michał Cielecki; Krzysztof Wierzynkiewicz
- Series: Shadow Warrior
- Engine: Road Hog Engine
- Platforms: Microsoft Windows, PlayStation 4, Xbox One, Linux, Mac OS X
- Release: Windows: NA: 26 September 2013; EU: 11 October 2013; PlayStation 4, Xbox One: NA: 21 October 2014; AU: 23 October 2014; EU: 24 October 2014; Linux, OS X 27 April 2015
- Genre: First-person shooter
- Mode: Single-player

Shadow Warrior is a 2013 first-person shooter game developed by Flying Wild Hog and published by Devolver Digital. The game is a reboot of the 1997 original of the same name, developed by 3D Realms and published by GT Interactive, licensed out by Devolver Digital. It features the same character Lo Wang and a modern era setting with East Asian mythology elements, all of which were redesigned with modern, full 3D graphics and new gameplay features, while also being a throwback to classic first-person shooters.

Shadow Warrior was released for Windows in September/October 2013. The game was later released for PlayStation 4 and Xbox One in October 2014. It was also released for Mac OS X and Linux in April 2015. It received mixed reviews from critics. A sequel, Shadow Warrior 2, was released in October 2016.

== Gameplay ==
Gameplay screenshot

Shadow Warrior is a single-player first-person shooter where players take control of the modern ninja mercenary Lo Wang from a first-person perspective as he fights through levels of demonic hordes. Levels themselves are divided into chapters, each with Wang progressing through smaller stages to large open battle arenas that have side and hidden areas, occasionally allowing another route.

Wang is equipped with various firearms that require ammunition that can be found throughout stages. Firearms range from fictional versions of pistols, submachine guns, shotguns and rocket launchers, some of which can be dual-wielded. These also include secondary firing modes that allow players to alternate between different modes or rates of fire. Non-firearm weapons include crossbows that can fire both ordinary bolts and sticky grenades that can be remotely detonated at will. In addition to firearms, Wang’s signature weapon is the katana, which is limited to close-quarters combat unlike ranged firearms, but is also very effective against enemies. Different swings and strikes can be utilized depending on different computer key and mouse movement combinations, creating unique moves of varying effectiveness depending on the enemy type, with the ability to slice up enemies into multiple pieces. For example, a well-timed and properly placed strike can decapitate and instantly take down a foe, or a large swing can strike multiple opponents at once. When using the katana, throwing shurikens can also be used as a secondary backup weapon. The katana can also be drawn to perform a quick strike when using firearms in closer quarters.

Enemies themselves vary in strength, size and attack pattern. Some enemies will aggressively attack head on while others use projectiles or other abilities to hinder Wang's effectiveness in combat. Certain enemies can also be hindered or only killed through the removal of certain limbs, as opposed to others than can be taken down with simpler direct measures. Certain enemies also occasionally drop items Wang can use including a demon heart that can kill or stun nearby enemies with one use and a demon head that can be used as to fire damaging flames at enemies. The game also features boss fights that are unique, only appearing at certain points in the game and much more formidable in combat, usually requiring key points of attack and minor puzzle elements within the stage.

Wang can upgrade his abilities and weapons with multiple forms of in-game currency for different aspects. "Money" is gained by locating it throughout levels and is used to upgrade weaponry such as recoil laser sights, extra barrels and new fire modes. "Karma" points are gained through how well the player performs in combat, like well-aimed gunshots and katana moves such as head shots and limb removals (indicated briefly in-game) or large deposits hidden within stages. These points can be spent on new skills such as increasing healing and damage output, while also allowing new katana moves and luck bonuses. Finally there are "Ki Crystals" that can also be found hidden in levels that allow Wang to learn new powers that can be used in combat, including shockwave attacks, health and damage properties and stunning or manipulating enemies. These new abilities are represented through tattoos on Wang’s body. Wang’s health is indicated through the in-game head-up display. After taking damage, health can be regained through finding health packs found throughout levels. However Wang can also use a power that heals him up.

== Plot ==
Lo Wang (Jason Liebrecht) is an assassin who works for the powerful Japanese industrial magnate, Orochi Zilla. He is sent to purchase an ancient katana from a collector named Mizayaki for 2 million dollars. Mizayaki refuses the offer and Wang tries to take the sword by force, killing his men in the process. Wang is captured when Mizayaki reveals his bond with a demon named Hoji, and is caged, but escapes when demons attack the compound. Mizayaki is killed in the attack and Wang allies himself with Hoji in hopes of retrieving the sword. Hoji explains that the Nobitsura Kage, as the sword is called, is capable of slaying immortals and is anathema to demons. He also mentions that the Nobitsura Kage is actually three swords, and so Wang seeks them out to merge them into one.

Through the course of the game, Wang comes across "Whisperers": magical golems which contain a memory (in place of a heart) that one of the Ancients, the immortals that rule the demons, chose to sequester away. The Ancients cannot touch the Nobitsura Kage as just touching the weapon can kill them, but since Whisperers aren't truly alive, they can touch the blade therefore acting as couriers. By slaying these golems, Wang absorbs their memories and learns of the game's back-story.

In the Shadow Realm, the home realm of the demons, the rain is fueled by the weeping of Ameonna, the sister of Hoji and the other Ancients. Hoji and Ameonna had an incestuous affair, which made her happy and stopped the rain. This caused a disastrous drought, and when the affair was discovered by Enra, the ruler of the Shadow Realm, Hoji's other brothers, Gozu, Mezu, and Xing, separated the pair and skinned Hoji's face as punishment, forcing him to wear a mask. Ameonna accepted her responsibility to the Shadow Realm, which embittered Hoji against both her for her abandonment and Enra for his tyranny over the Ancients. He conspired to poison his sister and take revenge upon Enra, tricking Xing into delivering a tainted potion that put her into an eternal slumber and causing another drought, using this to draw Enra to the temple so that Xing could overthrow him and rule the Shadow Realm in his stead. But the plot was stopped by Mezu, the most loyal of the brothers to Enra. Xing was beheaded by Gozu on Enra's orders for his role in the plot, which did not kill him, and Hoji was banished to the mortal realm for his treachery. Enra later saw that only the sacrifice of an Ancient could revive Ameonna and save the Shadow Realm, and thus sought the Nobitsura Kage, the only thing in existence which can kill an Ancient. Enra brokered a deal with the mortal Zilla to find and assemble the sword, promising a cure for his paraplegia and the assistance of demons to conquer the Earth.

On his quest for the third piece of the sword, Wang, who originally sought the Nobitsura Kage to deliver to Zilla, turns against his boss, betraying the Kyokagami twins, fellow assassins who also work for Zilla, in order to help Hoji retrieve the final piece of the weapon. It's discovered that Zilla was holding a Whisperer hostage the whole time, and is in possession of the third piece of the sword. When Enra teleports Hoji back to the Shadow Realm, Wang uses the last Whisperer on earth to travel to the Shadow Realm and learns that Hoji, who originally created the Whisperers, regrets his role in plunging the Shadow Realm into misery and seeks to undo his wrong by creating another Whisperer, taking away his memory of Wang. Wang convinces him that Enra needs to be stopped, and so the two join forces once more, with Hoji seeking to redeem himself by killing Enra and using his blood to revive Ameonna. Upon their return to Earth, Wang confronts Zilla, and cuts off his sword arm. As Wang reassembles the Nobitsura Kage to its full Ancient-killing power, Zilla escapes with the help of the Kyokagami twins.

With the full Nobitsura Kage in his hands, Wang returns to the Shadow Realm with Hoji to confront Enra. Wang is captured by Enra and stripped of the sword. Enra tries to sacrifice Hoji to revive Ameonna by means of using the original Whisperer that Hoji made - which like the others before, can handle the Nobitsura Kage without harm - but Hoji disarms the Whisperer and hands the sword back to Wang, forcing Enra to retreat. But by touching the Nobitsura Kage, Hoji dooms himself. Wang corners Enra, and after a tense battle with Xing's headless body, Enra allows Wang to slay him, since he is the only sacrificial candidate left. Ameonna awakens, and upon seeing the dead body of Hoji, she weeps, bringing rain back to the Shadow Realm.

== Development ==
Devolver Digital planned to reboot the game with Flying Wild Hog as the developer in mind from the start, first approaching Scott Miller of 3D Realms about new developments. As with the developer's last game Hard Reset, according to studio writer Jan Bartkowicz the game was designed to reflect the "old school design" with emphasis on fast-paced shooting against masses of enemies and no use of cover mechanics. Bartkowicz however also stated that they wanted the gameplay to also be new in other aspects, particularly the katana, not wanting it to be "only used when you ran out of ammo" but rather make it an integral part of the gameplay. In regards to the new writing style and character redesign, Bartkowicz explained it as "a much more clever sense of humor and wit, rather than relying on the old Duke Nukem or Shadow Warrior tropes, falling back on jokes about women and racial stereotyping," instead being drawn to what they considered to be the "rich setting" of the original game.

The game was first announced in May 2013 with a teaser trailer that showed the new graphics engine with the in-game cinematic following a trail of bodies left by Lo Wang before revealing the character of Hoji. The game was further shown off at E3 2013 in June, conveying the trademark humor and over-the-top violence, with designer Paweł Kowalewski comparing it to an exploitation film, calling it "so violent it's funny". Kowalewski stated that they wanted to keep the violence of the original that "when we started doing our version, we knew that we had to still maintain that violence" while story writer Slawomir Uliasz said the redesigns were to create a newer experience such as Lo Wang who is depicted younger while the original was an old veteran, retaining the humor like one-liners "to keep true to the original" while also not wanting it to be "too serious" either. Both Kowalewski and Uliasz called themselves fans of the original, seeing it as "an opportunity to create an oldschool game", before concluding that while new "it's still Shadow Warrior". A follow-up trailer titled "You've Got Wang" featured gameplay footage and emphasized the humor not in the teaser trailer, at the same time announcing the release date for 26 September 2013 along with pre-orders being made available on the applicable digital stores. 30 minutes of gameplay of the beta version was commentated by John Bain 15 August 2013, positively explaining the gameplay mechanics and differences and similarities with the original game.

On 27 April 2015, Shadow Warrior was ported to Mac OS X and Linux by Knockout Games.

== Release and downloadable content ==
The game was released on Steam and GOG.com, with pre-orders on both services. Steam sells two editions: a standard edition and a "Special Edition" that included a digital art book, official soundtrack, and two in-game weapons based on other Devolver Digital published titles; a sledgehammer from Serious Sam 3: BFE and a katana from Hotline Miami in the same retro-pixelated graphics style of that game. Pre-ordering from Steam also gave players the "Zilla Enterprises Z45 katana" in-game weapon and a 75% discount off Hard Reset or another Devolver Digital published game. If players already own a copy of Saints Row IV on Steam, an in-game weapon known as the "Penetrator" from the series would also be made available. GOG.com also released the standard version yet with the pre-order bonus of a "classic Shadow Warrior katana" in-game weapon and a digital copy of the site's Shadow Warrior Classic Complete release of the original game for free.

On 11 October 2013, a stand-alone mini-game known as Viscera Cleanup Detail: Shadow Warrior was released for free for owners of Shadow Warrior. It is a crossover with Viscera Cleanup Detail, a Steam Greenlight game developed by RuneStorm where players must clean up blood and body parts left after a violent slaughter aboard a space station. Like that game, the mini-game instead has the player cleaning up the mess in the aftermath of the early battle between Lo Wang and the Yakuza.

== Reception ==
Reception

Aggregate score
| Aggregator | Score | | |
| Aggregator | PC | PS4 | Xbox One |
|---|---|---|---|
| Metacritic | 73/100 | 70/100 | 74/100 |

Review scores
| Publication | Score | | |
| Publication | PC | PS4 | Xbox One |
|---|---|---|---|
| 4Players | 76% | 77% | 77% |
| Destructoid | 8.5/10 | N/A | N/A |
| Edge | 6/10 | N/A | N/A |
| Eurogamer | N/A | 7/10 | N/A |
| GameSpot | 7/10 | N/A | N/A |
| GameTrailers | 6/10 | N/A | N/A |
| GameZone | 8.5/10 | N/A | N/A |
| Hardcore Gamer | 4/5 | N/A | 4/5 |
| IGN | 8.6/10 | N/A | N/A |
| PlayStation Official Magazine – UK | N/A | 7/10 | N/A |
| Official Xbox Magazine (UK) | N/A | N/A | 7/10 |
| PC Gamer (UK) | 80% | N/A | N/A |
| Polygon | 6.5/10 | N/A | N/A |
| Push Square | N/A | 5/10 | N/A |
| The Digital Fix | 8/10 | 8/10 | N/A |
| The Escapist | 3.5/5 | N/A | N/A |

Shadow Warrior received "mixed or average" reviews from critics, according to review aggregator website Metacritic.

M Randy of Destructoid said of the PC version, "Impressive effort with a few noticeable problems holding it back. Won't astound everyone, but is worth your time and cash." GameSpot's Kevin VanOrd favorably compared the same PC version over other modern reboots in terms of gameplay and humor, particularly against another former 3D Realms series Duke Nukem that "unlike Duke's return in Duke Nukem Forever, Lo Wang's reappearance isn't a sad and outdated one", also noting the variety in the combat segments, finding "that magical sweet spot where you feel as if you overcame the odds without ever encountering the frustration." When commenting on the boss fights, however, VanOrd felt that while they "make for a fearsome presence" visually, he noted the overly straightforward strategy for all of them, causing them to "drag" and become "slogs". Dan Stapleton of IGN said that the same PC version's excellent fast-paced swordplay and surprising story make Lo Wang's comeback tour a great success." On VideoGamer.com, Pete Worth called the PC version "A fun, if limited, throwback", while Tom Orry said that the PlayStation 4 and Xbox One versions were "old-school in all the right ways, bringing the original into the modern era while leaving some of its less desirable aspects in the past where they belong."

Darrell Shayler of The Digital Fix gave the PC version a score of eight out of ten, calling it "an unrepentant love poem for all things 90s and plays out as a greatest hits album of the video games and buddy cop movies from that time." Liam Croft later gave the PlayStation 4 version the same 8/10 score, saying, "If you're looking for humour and a bucket load of fun in this busy gaming period, then look no further than Shadow Warrior." Paul Goodman of The Escapist gave the PC version three-and-a-half stars out of five, saying, "Shadow Warrior isn't free of some design flaws that can take away from the experience, but as an action game, its combat is solidly put together. While not the easiest to use, the various weapons and sword fighting combos you have really make you feel like a badass warrior whenever you pull off a gruesome decapitation." Roger Hargreaves of Metro gave the PC and PlayStation 4 versions each a score of six out of ten, saying, "For a game obsessed with OTT violence and knob gags this is a surprisingly charming and likeable shooter, if an unavoidably shallow and repetitive one."

== Sequels ==
On 10 June 2015, publisher Devolver Digital announced Shadow Warrior 2, a sequel to the game, developed by Flying Wild Hog. An announcement trailer soon followed, confirming the game for Microsoft Windows, Mac OS X, Linux, PlayStation 4 and Xbox One to be released in 2016. The sequel featured four-player co-operative multiplayer upon launch. It was released for Windows in October 2016 and PlayStation 4 and Xbox One in May 2017. The next game in the series, Shadow Warrior 3, was released in 2022.
