= SW3 =

SW3 may refer to:

- Samurai Warriors 3
- Shadow Warrior 3
- SW postcode area
- Chelsea, London
- Star Wars: Episode III – Revenge of the Sith
- Kupang LRT station, Singapore
- Schwassmann–Wachmann 3, a short period comet
