= Shadow Warrior =

- Genre: First-person shooter
- Developers: 3D Realms (1997); Flying Wild Hog (2013–present)
- Publishers: GT Interactive (1997–2005); Devolver Digital (2013–present)
- Creators: Frank Maddin; Jim Norwood; Ken Silverman
- Platforms: MS-DOS, Mac OS, iOS, Microsoft Windows, OS X, Linux, PlayStation 4, Xbox One
- First release: Shadow Warrior; May 13, 1997
- Latest release: Shadow Warrior 3 March 1, 2022

Shadow Warrior is a series of first-person shooter video games that focuses on the exploits of Lo Wang, a modern ninja warrior who fights through hordes of demons. The original series is made up of one game, Shadow Warrior (1997), and two expansions Twin Dragon (1998), and Wanton Destruction (2005), and a reboot with three entries: Shadow Warrior (2013), Shadow Warrior 2 (2016), and Shadow Warrior 3 (2022). The series was originally developed by 3D Realms and published by GT Interactive; later, Flying Wild Hog and Devolver Digital took over development and publication, respectively.

== Games ==
Release timeline
1997	Shadow Warrior
1998	Twin Dragon
1999
2000
2001
2002
2003
2004
2005	Wanton Destruction
2006
2007
2008
2009
2010
2011
2012
2013	Shadow Warrior
2014
2015
2016	Shadow Warrior 2
2017
2018
2019
2020
2021
2022	Shadow Warrior 3

=== Shadow Warrior (1997) ===
Development of Shadow Warrior began in early 1994 as Shadow Warrior 3D by 3D Realms. Jim Norwood came up with the game idea, George Broussard designed the protagonist Lo Wang and Michael Wallin did some concept sketches. Two downloadable content packs, Twin Dragon and Wanton Destruction, were released in 1998 and 2005 respectively.

=== Shadow Warrior (2013) ===
In 2013, publisher Devolver Digital and Polish developer Flying Wild Hog announced that they were collaborating with each other to produce a follow-up to the first game. Shadow Warrior has a larger emphasis on the story. In the game, Lo Wang goes on a quest to locate the legendary Nobitsura Kage blade with a banished demon named Hoji. The game received generally mixed reviews when it was released in September 2013 for Windows. The console versions for the game were released in October 2014.

=== Shadow Warrior 2 (2016) ===
Flying Wild Hog returned to develop a sequel to the 2013 video game. The game features a cooperative multiplayer mode, procedural generation, large and open levels and systems similar to that of a looter shooter. In the game, Lo Wang goes on a journey to save Kamiko, the daughter of a Yakuza leader, from ZillaCorps. The game received generally positive reviews when it was released in October 2016 for Windows, PlayStation 4 and Xbox One.

=== Shadow Warrior 3 (2022) ===
Shadow Warrior 3 was released on March 1, 2022, for Windows, PlayStation 4 and Xbox One. In the game, Lo Wang must work with his sidekick to defeat an ancient dragon that they have accidentally unleashed.
