= Juju (video game) =

2014 action-adventure indie video game

- Developer: Flying Wild Hog
- Publishers: Nordic Games (X360); Flying Wild Hog
- Director: Klaudiusz Zych
- Engine: Unreal Engine 3
- Platforms: PlayStation 3 Windows; Xbox 360; Android
- Release: PS3, Windows, Xbox 360: NA: December 9, 2014; EU: December 10, 2014; Android: NA: May 28, 2015
- Genre: Action-adventure
- Modes: Single-player, multiplayer

Juju is an action-adventure game developed by Polish studio Flying Wild Hog, and published by Nordic Games for the Xbox 360 and by Flying Wild Hog for PlayStation 3 and Windows.

It was released in December 2014 for PlayStation 3 and Xbox 360, as well as Windows via Steam, and in May 2015 for the Android operating system via Nvidia Shield TV.

== Gameplay ==
The gameplay of Juju is similar to other 2D platformers. The player controls Juju as she jumps, runs, and attacks enemies. The game features a variety of power-ups.

Juju also features several challenge rooms. These rooms are optional and can be completed to earn extra rewards. The challenge rooms are often very difficult and require the player to use all of Juju's abilities to succeed.

The boss fights in Juju are particularly challenging. The bosses have a variety of attacks and can be very difficult to defeat. The player must use all of Juju's abilities and learn the boss's attack patterns to succeed.

== Reception ==
Reception

Aggregate score
Aggregator	Score
Metacritic	(PC) 65/100 (PS3) 63/100 (X360) 68/100

Review score
Publication	Score
GameSpot	6/10

Juju received "mixed or average" reviews according to review aggregator Metacritic.

Jason Venter for GameSpot rated the game 6/10, stating that "With Juju, the developers at Flying Wild Hog have cobbled together a charming adventure that never surpasses its inspiration but still manages to provide a generally inoffensive romp through gorgeous fantasy worlds."

Dave Letcavage for Pure Xbox rated the game 8/10, stating that "Juju is a great purchase for kids and families that like to play together. It's one of the season's biggest downloadable surprises."

Joey Davidson for PlayStation LifeStyle stated that "I hate to make it seem like I absolutely despise Juju. That's not the case at all. This is a cheap game that will entertain those who play it as long as they maintain the right mindset."
