= Flying Wild Hog =

Polish video game developer

- Type: Subsidiary
- Industry: Video games
- Founded: 1 April 2009; 17 years ago
- Headquarters: Warsaw, Poland
- Number of locations: 3 studios (Note: The three studios comprise the headquarters in Warsaw and two additional offices in Kraków and Rzeszów.)
- Area served: Worldwide
- Key people: Michał Szustak (CEO)
- Products: Tomb Raider: Legacy of Atlantis; Evil West; Shadow Warrior; Trek to Yomi; Hard Reset
- Number of employees: 330
- Parent: Supernova Capital (2019–2020); Plaion (2020–present)
- Website: flyingwildhog.com

Flying Wild Hog is a Polish video game developer headquartered in Warsaw. The studio was founded in April 2009, and its first title, Hard Reset, was released in 2011. It has since become known for its work on action games including Trek to Yomi (2022) and the Shadow Warrior series. The studio is also co-developing Tomb Raider: Legacy of Atlantis (2027) with Crystal Dynamics.

== History ==
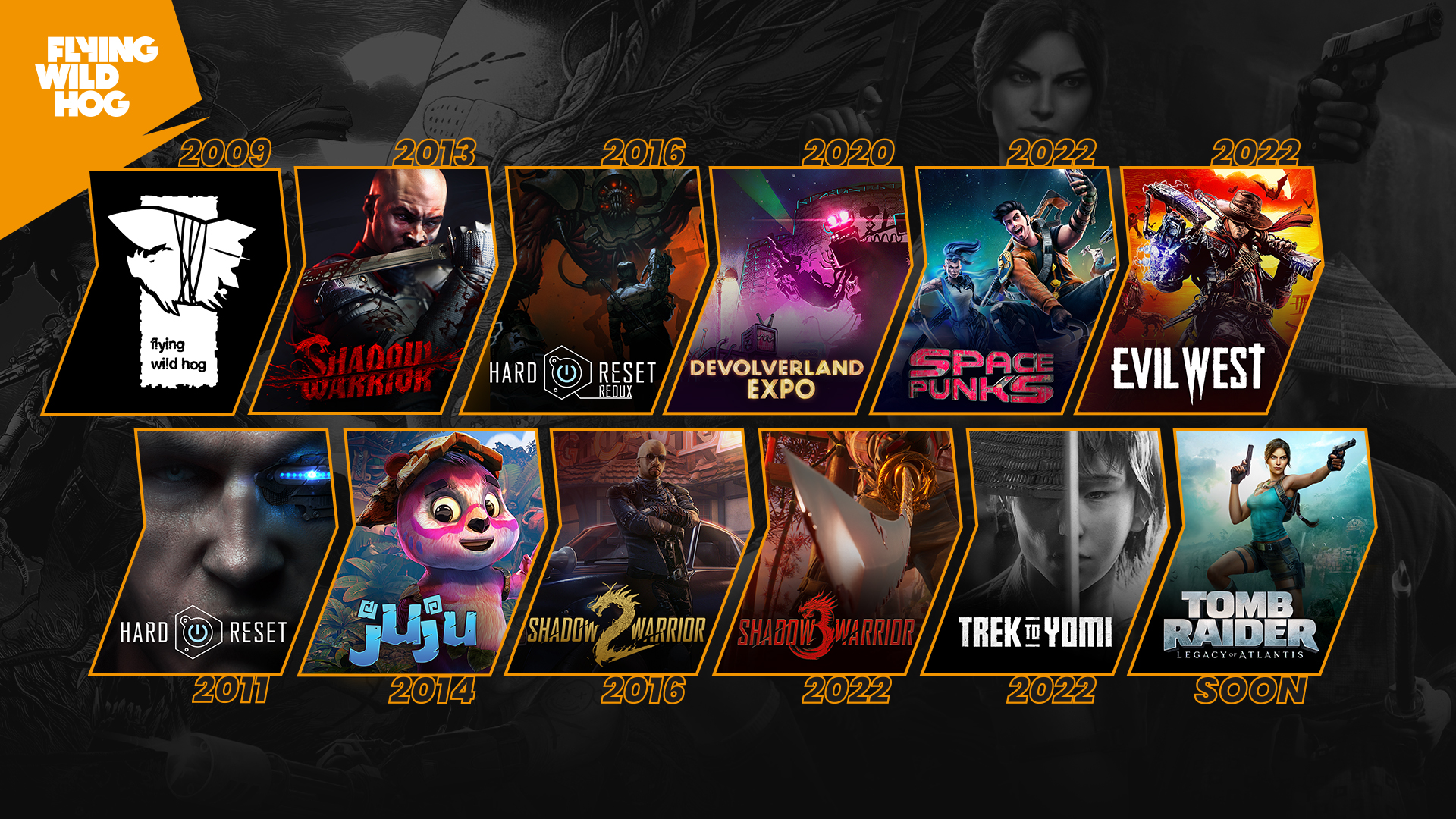
The timeline of Flying Wild Hog's activities and game releases (up until 2027)

Flying Wild Hog was established on April 1, 2009. The studio created its own proprietary video gaming engine called Road Hog Engine. In September 2011, its first game, Hard Reset, was released. It was a cyberpunk themed first-person shooter that received positive reviews thanks to its visual style and fast-paced gameplay. This title was later re-released as Hard Reset Redux, with updated content and technical improvements.

In September 2013, the studio released Shadow Warrior, a reboot of the 1997 title of the same name. The game combined melee combat with shooting mechanics, and marked the beginning of Flying Wild Hog's long-term collaboration with publisher Devolver Digital.

In December 2014, the studio released Juju, a family-friendly platform game developed in cooperation with other partners. The title represented a stylistic departure from the studio's core focus on action shooters and represented the studio's ability to work on different genres of games.

In December 2015, Flying Wild Hog opened a new division in Kraków, led by Michał Kuk.

In October 2016, Flying Wild Hog released Shadow Warrior 2, expanding the formula of its predecessor with procedural level design and cooperative multiplayer elements. The same year, Hard Reset Redux was launched as an enhanced console and PC version of the original title.

In March 2019, Flying Wild Hog was acquired by Supernova Capital, an investment firm started by Paul Wedgwood - the former CEO of Splash Damage, and other members from the same company. The acquisition provides financial security for Flying Wild Hog to focus more on its game development.

In July 2020, the studio released Devolverland Expo, a free promotional first-person experience created in close collaboration with Devolver Digital as a satirical digital event space. In November 2020, Embracer Group acquired Flying Wild Hog through Koch Media (now Plaion), integrating the studio into the Embracer Group structure.

2022 marked Flying Wild Hog's biggest year-to-date, as the studio released four titles. Shadow Warrior 3, released in March, is a continuation of the franchise focusing on linear level design and fast-paced combat. Trek to Yomi, released in May, is a black-and-white side-scrolling action-adventure inspired by classic samurai cinema. Space Punks (published by Jagex), released in July, is a cooperative online action RPG with looter-shooter mechanics. Evil West, released in November, is a third-person action game set in a dark fantasy version of the American frontier.

In 2022, the studio also transitioned from its proprietary Road Hog Engine to Unreal Engine for future productions.

=== Upcoming projects ===
In 2025, Flying Wild Hog announced its involvement in the development of Tomb Raider: Legacy of Atlantis, in collaboration with Crystal Dynamics and Amazon Games. The title is part of the long-running Tomb Raider franchise and is the studio's first project within the series. The game is a remake of Tomb Raider (1996), powered by Unreal Engine 5 and featuring new graphics and gameplay mechanics. The game is being developed for PC and consoles, and is set for release in February 2027.

As of 2026, Flying Wild Hog is working on additional unannounced projects. The studio has confirmed that these projects are being developed using Unreal Engine and are aligned with its focus on action-oriented AAA productions.

=== Studio name origins ===
The name Flying Wild Hog was established at the time of the studio's founding in 2009. According to the company, the “Wild Hog” element was inspired by the founders’ enthusiasm for the video game World of Warcraft, which was highly popular at the time. The name references in-game elements associated with the fictional city of Orgrimmar.

The “Flying” component was added to symbolize freedom and independence. As described by the studio, flying represents creative freedom, autonomy, and the ambition to build an independent game development company. The combined name reflects both the founders’ gaming roots and their aspiration to operate as a bold, self-directed studio within the global games industry.

The hog has since become the company's official mascot and visual symbol.

== Games developed ==
Year	Title	Platform(s)	Publisher(s)
2011	Hard Reset	PlayStation 4, Xbox One, Windows	Flying Wild Hog
2013	Shadow Warrior	Linux, macOS, PlayStation 4, Windows, Xbox One	Devolver Digital
2014	Juju	PlayStation 3, Xbox 360, Windows	Flying Wild Hog
2016	Hard Reset Redux	PlayStation 4, Xbox One, Windows	Gambitious Digital Entertainment
2016	Shadow Warrior 2	PlayStation 4, Xbox One, Windows	Devolver Digital
2020	Devolverland Expo	Windows	Devolver Digital
2022	Shadow Warrior 3	PlayStation 4, PlayStation 5, Xbox One, Xbox Series X/S, Windows	Devolver Digital
2022	Trek to Yomi	PlayStation 4, PlayStation 5, Xbox One, Xbox Series X/S, Nintendo Switch, Windows	Devolver Digital
2022	Evil West	PlayStation 4, PlayStation 5, Xbox One, Xbox Series X/S, Windows	Focus Entertainment
2022	Space Punks	PlayStation 4, PlayStation 5, Windows	Jagex
2027	Tomb Raider: Legacy of Atlantis	Nintendo Switch 2, PlayStation 5, Xbox Series X/S, Windows	Amazon Game Studios
