= Hard Reset =

2011 video game

- Developer: Flying Wild Hog
- Publishers: Flying Wild Hog; Gambitious Digital Entertainment (Redux)
- Director: Michal Szustak
- Designers: Michal Szustak; Klaudiusz Zych
- Artists: Pawel Libiszewski; Zbigniew Siatecki; Lukasz Zdunowski
- Composer: Wojciech Blazejczyk
- Engine: Road Hog Engine
- Platforms: Microsoft Windows; PlayStation 4; Xbox One; Amazon Luna
- Release: Windows: WW: 13 September 2011; Redux; Windows, PS4, Xbox One: WW: 3 June 2016; PAL: 8 June 2016 (PS4); Amazon Luna: US: 20 October 2020
- Genre: First-person shooter
- Mode: Single-player

Hard Reset is a 2011 first-person shooter game developed by Flying Wild Hog and released for Windows in September 2011. The game features a cyberpunk plot within a dystopian world, and draws inspiration from the works of William Gibson, Neal Stephenson, and Philip K. Dick to create its story, setting and atmosphere.

In 2012, Hard Reset received a free expansion titled Hard Reset: Exile, and was then bundled as Hard Reset: Extended Edition. In June 2016, a remastered version called Hard Reset Redux was released alongside versions for PlayStation 4 and Xbox One with upgraded graphics and new weapons and enemies. Redux was made available for Amazon Luna in October 2020. The game received mixed reviews from critics.

== Gameplay ==
Hard Reset is modeled on video games such as Quake and Unreal, which results in more straightforward gameplay than most contemporary first-person shooters. The various stages have secret areas with hidden pick ups such as health and ammunition. The environments are designed similarly, as there are explosive barrels and various vending machines outfitted with electroshock anti-vandalism defenses, that can trigger splash damage by being shot at, scattered throughout the levels, which the player can use by luring enemies near them. The game lacks a multiplayer mode, which was a chief criticism.

Unlike most old-school first-person shooters, which feature a liberal variety of guns and throwable weapons that can be stored in a magic satchel-style inventory, Hard Reset features only two weapons, the CLN Modular Assault Rifle, and the EEF-21 Plasma Rifle. Both weapons have unlockable firing modes, the Modular Assault Rifle including the option to strap add-ons such as grenade and rocket launchers, and the plasma rifle allowing railguns and stasis modules.

== Exile and Extended Edition ==
Hard Reset: Exile is a free expansion for Hard Reset. It was first released in March 2012 as a part of the boxed Hard Reset re-release called Hard Reset: Extended Edition. The expansion is available for all Steam owners of Hard Reset for free since July 2012. Hard Reset: Exile features a few new weapons, levels, enemy types, and a boss. It further continues the story of James Fletcher, as he journeys into the outer city's robot-controlled territory and tracks down the Corporation's secret weapon that is self-aware and blocks the path toward the "Resistance" bases.

== Reception ==
Reception

Aggregate score
Aggregator	Score
Metacritic	(PC) 73/100 (PS4) 69/100 (XONE) 67/100

Review scores
Publication	Score
Destructoid	(PC) 8/10
Edge	(PC) 4/10
Game Informer	(PC) 7.75/10
GamePro	(PC) 3.5/5
GameSpot	(PC) 7/10
GameSpy	(PC) 4/5
GameTrailers	(PC) 7.9/10
GameZone	(PC) 7.5/10
IGN	(PC) 7.5/10
PC Gamer (UK)	(PC) 58%
PC PowerPlay	(PC) 9/10
The Telegraph	(PC) 4/5
VideoGamer.com	(XOne) 7/10
The Digital Fix	(XOne) 6/10

Hard Reset and Hard Reset Redux received "mixed or average" reviews from critics, according to the review aggregator website Metacritic.

Reviewers cited the visual quality and the intensity of the gameplay as strong points, evoking comparisons to other "old-school" shooters as Serious Sam or Painkiller. Common points of contention were the game's relatively short length, limited level design, and the perceived difficulty.
