= Shadow Warrior 3 =

2022 video game

- Developer: Flying Wild Hog
- Publisher: Devolver Digital
- Directors: Jakub Opoń; Michał Szustak; Paweł Libiszewski
- Producer: Bartłomiej Sawicki
- Designer: Paweł Kowalewski
- Artist: Konrad Czernik
- Writer: Aleksander Sajnach
- Composer: Maciej Kulesza
- Series: Shadow Warrior
- Engine: Unreal Engine 4
- Platforms: Microsoft Windows; PlayStation 4; Xbox One; PlayStation 5; Xbox Series X/S
- Release: Windows, PS4, Xbox One; 1 March 2022; PS5, Xbox Series X/S; 16 February 2023
- Genre: First-person shooter
- Mode: Single-player

Shadow Warrior 3 is a 2022 first-person shooter game developed by Flying Wild Hog and published by Devolver Digital. The sequel to Shadow Warrior 2 (2016), the game was released for PlayStation 4, Windows, and Xbox One on 1 March 2022. It was later released for PlayStation 5 and Xbox Series X/S on 16 February 2023. It received mixed reviews from critics.

== Gameplay ==
Like its predecessors, the game is a first-person shooter and the player assumes control of Lo Wang, the series protagonist. In the game, Lo Wang has access to a large arsenal of firearms which can be used to defeat enemies. In addition, he also wields a katana, which is limited to close-quarters combat. At close range, players can execute wounded enemies. They can also use the environment to their advantage. As the player progresses in the game, they receive new weapons and gadgets which aid them in combat, all of which are meant to be unlocked and available by the time the player reaches the mid-point of the campaign. The game features more linear levels and a more streamlined upgrade system when compared with Shadow Warrior 2, though it introduced new movement options for Lo Wang, such as giving him the option to wall run, double jump, air dash, and utilize a grappling hook to quickly transverse between platforms and vertical surfaces.

== Story ==
Some time after Lo Wang released an ancient dragon by accident, global civilization has been almost wiped out due to the presence of the dragon and the demonic beings that overrun the world. Wang himself has become a recluse, wallowing in depression due to his failure to defeat the dragon. Wang's former nemesis, Orochi Zilla, convinces him to continue fighting. The two of them seek out Motoko, a witch who knows of a way to defeat the dragon using the residual energy in Hoji's mask. Amidst Motoko's ritual, Hoji is revived, prompting Wang to disrupt the ritual to save his friend. Hoji first asks Wang to help restore his physical body, then guides him toward a contraption called a "Chi cannon", which supposedly has enough power to destroy the dragon. Unbeknownst to Wang, Hoji intends to use the cannon to drain the dragon's power and make it his, in order to become an all-powerful God. However, Hoji makes a miscalculation, and the dragon swallows the cannon.

After confronting Hoji on his treachery, the two of them agree to work with Zilla and Motoko to defeat the dragon. Wang sends Motoko's familiar, a tanuki, toward the dragon, intending to use it as an explosive bait, but it fails to kill the dragon. Seeing no other options, Wang decides to jump into the dragon's mouth himself, where he activates Hoji's Chi cannon from the inside. Wang successfully kills the dragon with the cannon, and manages to escape death with Hoji and Zilla's help. They later celebrate their victory over a meal with Motoko and the ghost of the tanuki.

== Development ==
Shadow Warrior 3 was developed by Polish studio Flying Wild Hog. Game designer Paweł Kowalewski described the game as the "upgraded" version of the 2013 reboot, adding that the game is "over-the-top" and that it will make players "feel overpowered". The new movement options were added as the team "wanted players to be able to move freely like a ninja from their favorite animes". This also allowed the team to craft combat arenas that are more vertical in design. Many systems in Shadow Warrior 2, including weapon stats, procedural generated maps, and character progression, were streamlined or removed altogether in Shadow Warrior 3, so that players can focus on the action and need not to worry about their combat efficiency.

The team drew inspirations from both Japanese and Chinese cultures when they were creating the game's universe. The game's humor also became more mature, with the team saying that they wanted to "modernize" Lo Wang as a video game character by giving him more backstory.

== Release ==
Devolver Digital officially announced Shadow Warrior 3 on 6 July 2020. The game was released for PlayStation 4, Windows, and Xbox One on 1 March 2022. It was later released for PlayStation 5 and Xbox Series X/S on 16 February 2023, alongside a definitive edition of the game featuring a new difficulty mode, 60 FPS performance mode, and 4K visual modes.

== Reception ==
Reception

Aggregate score
Aggregator	Score
Metacritic	PC: 71/100; PS4: 63/100

Review scores
Publication	Score
Game Informer	7.5/10
GameRevolution	6.5/10
GameStar	75/100
Hardcore Gamer	4/5
HobbyConsolas	75/100
IGN	7/10
MeriStation	7.2/10
PC Gamer (US)	52/100
PC Games (DE)	6/10
Push Square	6/10
Shacknews	7/10
The Games Machine (Italy)	7.5/10

Shadow Warrior 3 received "mixed or average" reviews from critics, according to review aggregator website Metacritic.

IGN said that the game felt good to play and wrote in favor of its short runtime, but noted that it was "completely unremarkable in execution, being about as straightforward as an FPS can get." Hardcore Gamer reviewed the title favorably, writing, "It may not be reinventing the wheel in any drastic means, but Shadow Warrior 3's warranted excess and lovably chaotic flow is one you'll easily get lost in and perhaps never want to get out of." PC Gamer, by contrast, was more mixed, criticizing Lo Wang's dialogue, and writing, "Shadow Warrior 3 is best experienced with dialog volume set to zero and subtitles turned off. It isn't malicious. It's tasteless. It's embarrassing, because it expects that you're the kind of person who'd enjoy it." Shacknews praised the title's movement mechanics, enemies, weapons, and technical performance, while heavily panning the poor presentation, narrative, campaign design, chromatic aberration effect, and the lack of co-op and HDR support.

Game Informer liked how the game didn't take itself too seriously, but criticized the lack of variety, saying that it "relies too heavily on the same grunts, which pose little threat and end up stealing excitement from almost every battle". While Rock Paper Shotgun enjoyed the finisher mechanic, they disliked Lo Wang's one liners, saying they were "overly cocky" and "unfunny".
