= Type 89 15 cm cannon =

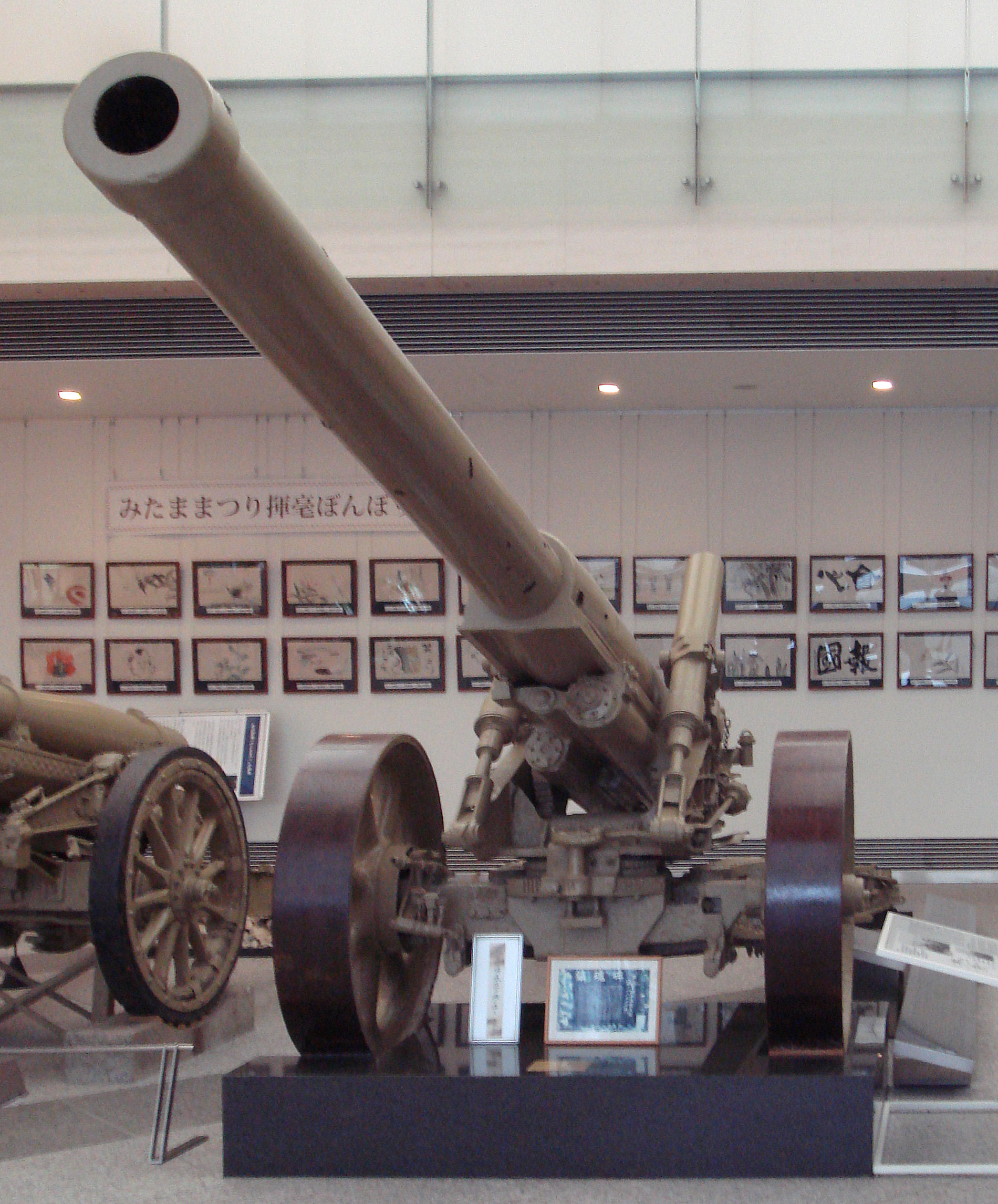
- Type: Fortress gun
- Place of origin: Empire of Japan

Service history
- In service: 1929–1945
- Used by: Imperial Japanese Army
- Wars: Sino-Japanese War, World War II

Production history
- Unit cost: 100,000 yen ($26,870 USD) in August 1939
- Produced: 1929–1943
- No. built: 150

Specifications
- Mass: 10,360 kg (22,840 lb) Firing; 7,809 kg (17,216 lb) Barrel 7,550 kg (16,645 lb) Cradle Travel
- Length: 8.03 m (26 ft 4 in) Firing; 7.63 m (25 ft 0 in) Barrel 7.29 m (23 ft 11 in) Cradle Traveling
- Barrel length: 6 m (19 ft 8 in) L/40
- Width: 1.73 m (5 ft 8 in) Track 2.21 m (7 ft 3 in) Maximum
- Height: 1.07 m (3 ft 6 in)
- Shell: HE, APHE, shrapnel, illumination
- Caliber: 15 cm (5.9 in)
- Breech: Interrupted screw
- Recoil: Hydro-pneumatic
- Carriage: Split trail
- Elevation: -5° to +43°
- Traverse: 40°
- Rate of fire: 2 rpm
- Muzzle velocity: 875 m/s (2,871 ft/s)
- Maximum firing range: 19,900 m (21,800 yd)

The Type 89 15 cm cannon (八九式十五糎加農砲, Hachikyūshiki Jyūgosenchi Kanōhō) was the main gun of the Imperial Japanese Army's heavy artillery units. The Type 89 designation was given to this gun as it was accepted in the year 2589 of the Japanese calendar (1929). It was widely used from the Manchurian Incident to the end of World War II, for example, Nomonhan, Bataan and Corregidor Island, Okinawa. The Type 89 15 cm gun was comparable to the U.S. M1918 155 mm GPF cannon, but it was less efficient than some similar heavy-caliber guns of other nations in World War II. Limitations notwithstanding, the Type 89 15 cm cannon was easier to transport and set up than other Japanese heavy artillery pieces.

== Design ==
The gun had the split-box type trail with detachable spades and a single-axle gun carriage. The traversing hand wheel and the scale were located on the left side of the carriage. The elevation scale, the range drum, and the sight were on the right side of the carriage. It fired a shell considerably heavier than that used in the 150 mm howitzer. The Japanese were sufficiently satisfied with this gun to provide it with a fixed mount for siege use in 1930, but as a heavy field piece it had certain definite limitations. Traveling in two loads, it took longer to emplace than some weapons of corresponding caliber in other modern armies and yet it was outranged by all of them. However, long-range 15 cm cannons which broke down into two loads were not unique to Japan during World War II.

The Type 89 had a variable hydro-pneumatic recoil system and an interrupted thread breech block; the latter had a mushroom head and stepped-up buttress-type screws. Two carriages have been recovered. The only apparent difference is in the two equilibrators: one has spring type and the other hydro-spring type. The trail is the split box type with detachable trail spades. The traversing handwheel and scale are located on the left side of the carriage; the scale is graduated up to 350 mils in ten-mil increments. The elevation scale, range drum, and sight are on the right side of the carriage; the range scale is graduated up to 42 degrees.

For traveling, the gun was broken down in two loads, carriage and barrel. The carriage and barrel were each drawn by a separate Type 92 8-ton tractor. The barrel being towed on a specific wagon.

== Combat record ==
The Type 89 saw service during the Nomonhan Incident. According to Japanese sources, the Type 89 was utilized during the Battle of Singapore, where Type 89 15 cm rounds impacting near the Sri Temasek convinced the wife of General Arthur Percival to ask him to think of surrendering. Type 89 15 cm cannons were also reportedly used during the invasion of the Philippines and Hong Kong. No example of this weapon was captured before 1944.

== Gallery ==
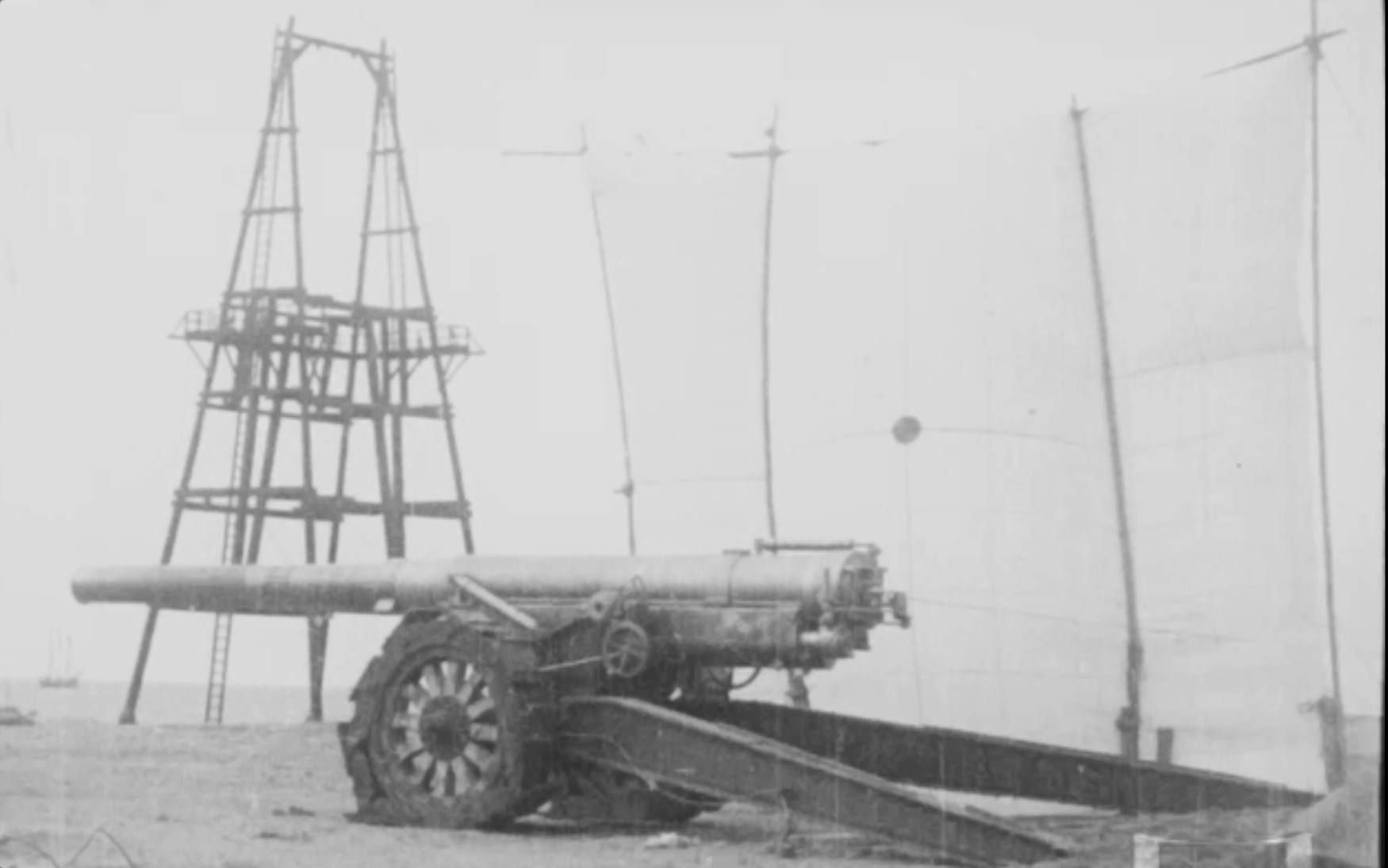
Early prototype during a test firing in 1924

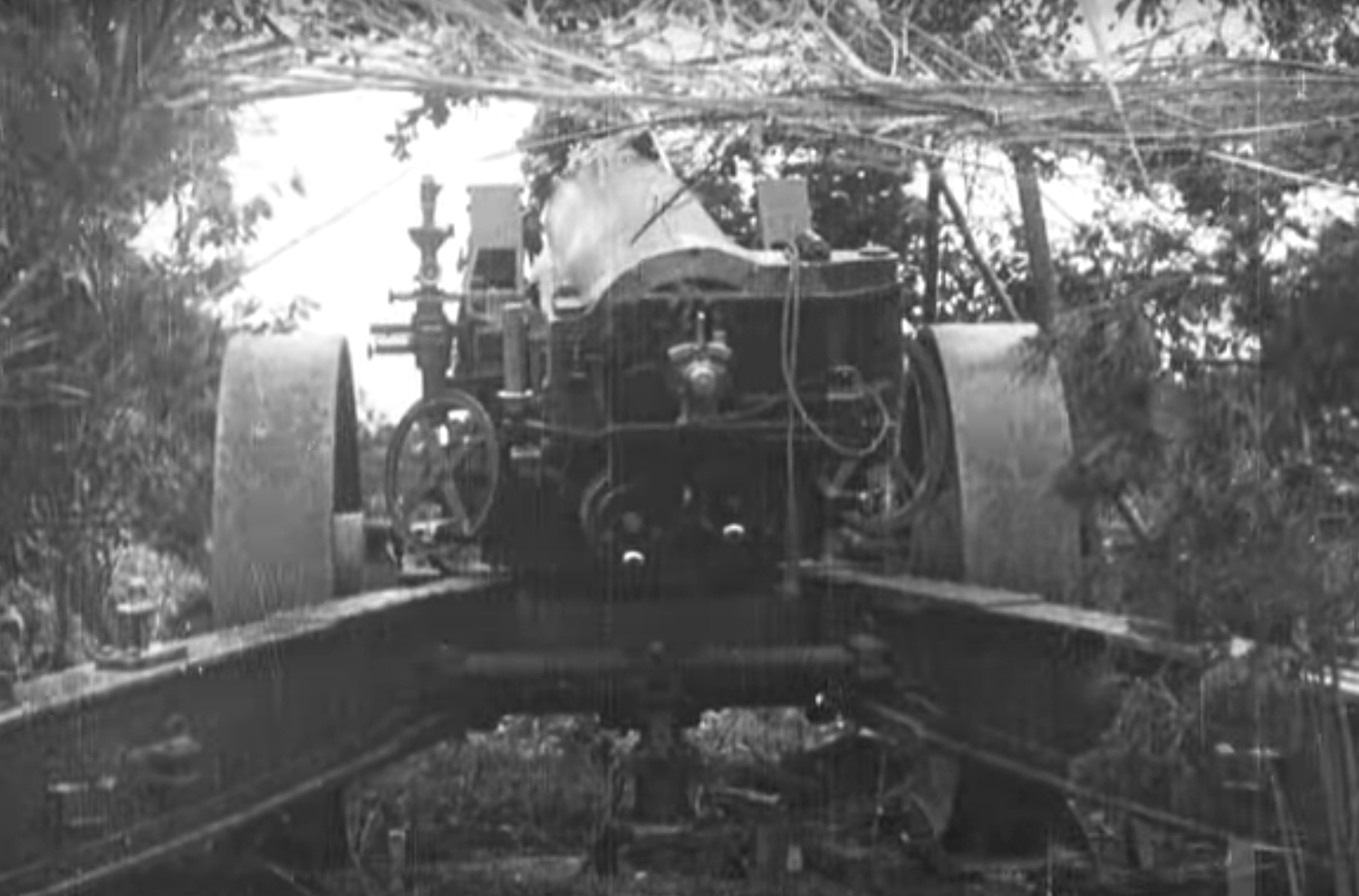
Rear view of a Type 89 15 cm cannon during an exercise in 1934
