= Artillery of Japan =

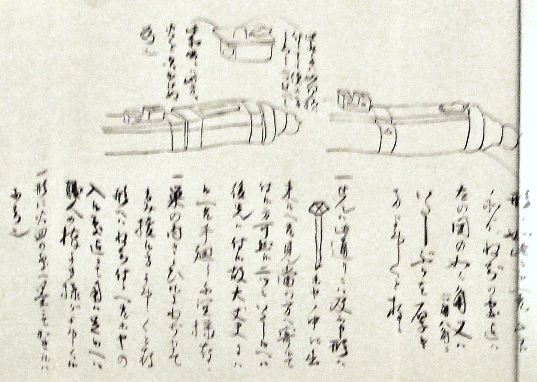
Description of the mechanism of a breech-loading swivel gun in Japanese. 16th century.

Artillery in Japan was first used during the Sengoku period in the 16th century, and its use has continued to develop.

== History ==
=== 13th to 17th century ===
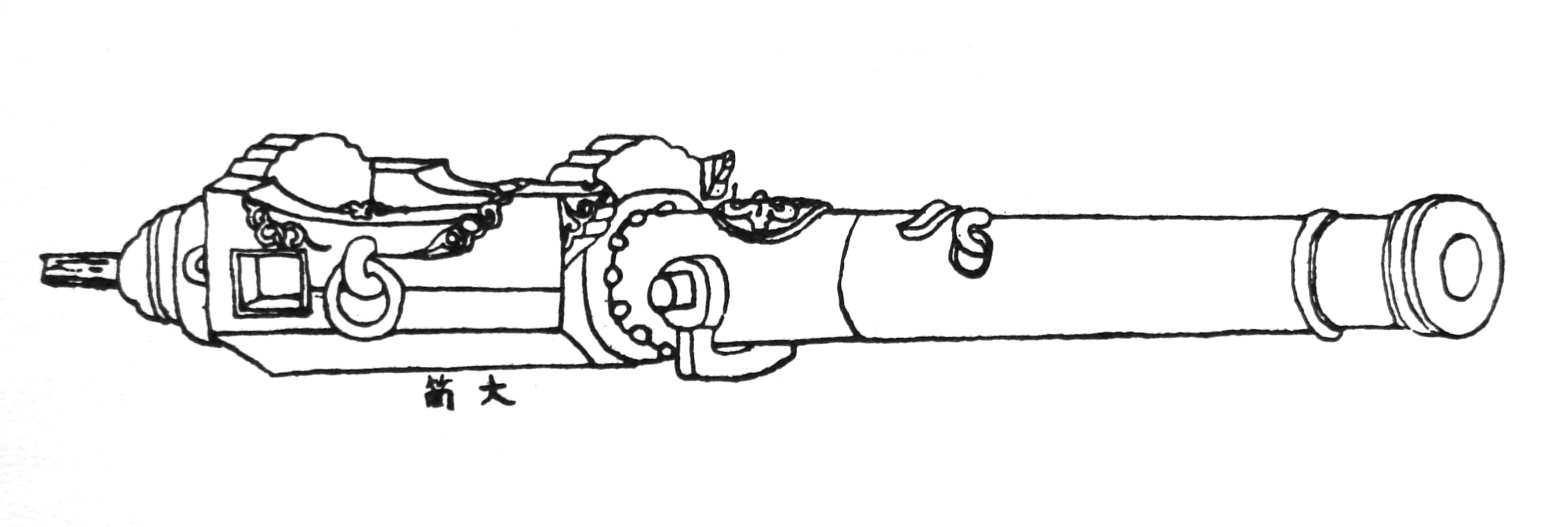
A 16th-century swivel breech-loading Japanese cannon, called an Ōzutsu (大筒, "Big Pipe").

Due to its proximity with China, Japan had long been familiar with gunpowder. During the Mongol invasions of Japan in 1274, Mongol forces employed bombs filled with gunpowder. In 1418, the Korean envoy Yi Ye reported obtaining a Chinese-made cast iron cannon from Japanese pirates on Tsushima.

The first Japanese matchlock guns were designed by the Japanese after Tanegashima Tokitaka bought two matchlock guns from Portuguese adventurers who were aboard a Chinese junk ship in Tanegashima in 1543. Within ten years of its introduction, over 300,000 tanegashima firearms were reported to have been manufactured.

The first significant development of cannons in Japan occurred during the 1550s, coinciding with the Nanban trade. Portuguese traders introduced two types of breech-loaded cannons to Ōtomo Sōrin. These cannons consisted of a heavy barrel mounted on a swivel and were loaded from the breech, with powder and shot inserted through a separate cylinder with a handle. The early European models were referred to as ishibiya (石火矢) or furankihō (フランキ砲), the latter likely influenced by the Chinese name, folangji (佛郎機). Additionally, the Ōtomo clan occasionally called them kunikuzushi (国崩), meaning "country destroyer."

The Ōtomo clan gained a clear advantage with the introduction of cannons, promptly employing them for coastal defense by 1558. They even dispatched a cannon to Ashikaga Yoshiteru in 1560 and sought further acquisitions from the Portuguese throughout the 1560s.

During the same period, the Ryukyu Kingdom constructed artillery fortifications to defend Naha Harbor, including Yarazamori Fortress, which helped repel pirate attacks in 1556.

A few light cannon pieces were used at the Battle of Nagashino in 1575, but the first cannons entirely made by the Japanese were cast only a few months after the battle. They were bronze two-pounders, about 9 feet long, and were delivered to the warlord Oda Nobunaga.

While many cannons were imported by Europeans, numerous examples were also manufactured locally. Quick-firing breech-loading swivel guns, were also used and manufactured by Japan. Such guns were in use in Western warships, and mounted at the bow and sterns to devastating effect, but the Japanese used them also in fortifications.

During the Siege of Osaka in 1614–1615, Tokugawa Ieyasu employed European artillery, including ten cannons purchased from Dutch and English suppliers, to bombard Osaka Castle.

After the reunification of Japan and the establishment of the Tokugawa Shogunate, a policy of seclusion was progressively enforced, leading to the expulsion of foreigners and the interdiction of trade with Western countries other than the Dutch from 1631.

=== Meiji restoration and modern era ===
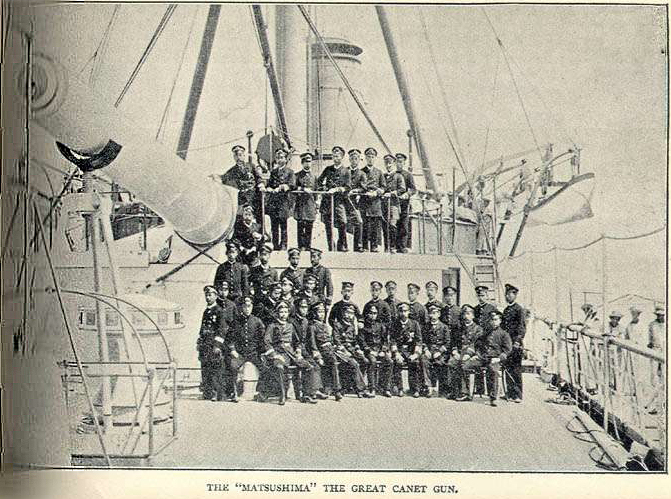
The French-built Matsushima, flagship of the Imperial Japanese Navy at the Battle of the Yalu River (1894), used a 320 mm (13 in) Canet gun.

Following the Meiji Restoration, Japan would pursue a policy of "Rich country, strong army" (富国強兵), which led to a general rearmament of the country. During the 1877 Satsuma rebellion artillery was widely deployed, and an average of 1,000 artillery shells were fired every day. Makeshift wooden cannons were seen on the "rebel" side of this conflict, and during popular upheavals in 1884.

Japanese artillery would then be used effectively during the Sino-Japanese War (1894–1895), and the Russo-Japanese War of 1905.

The Imperial Japanese Navy enjoyed a spectacular development, allowing for the implementation of ever-larger artillery pieces. The Imperial Navy was the world's first to mount 356 mm (14 in) guns (in Kongō), 406 mm (16 in) guns (in Nagato), and only the second Navy ever to mount 460 mm (18 in) guns (in the Yamato class).

Before and during World War II, Japan deployed a variety of artillery pieces, such as the heavy Type 89 15 cm Cannon or the Type 96 15 cm Howitzer (1936) .

== Gallery ==
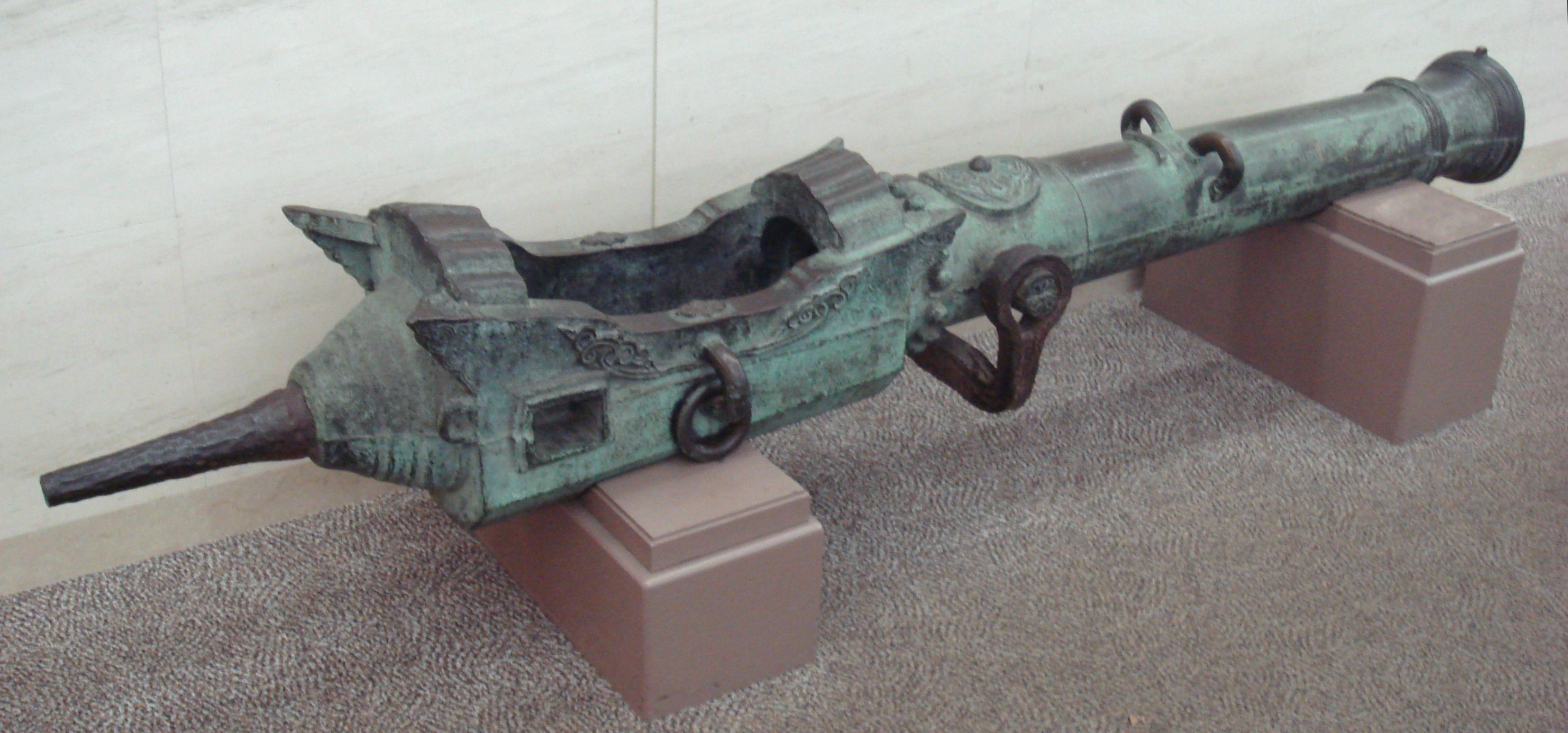
A breech-loading swivel gun of Sengoku era. This gun is thought to have been cast in Portuguese Goa, India and used by famous Christian daimyo Ōtomo Sōrin. Caliber: 95mm, length: 2880mm

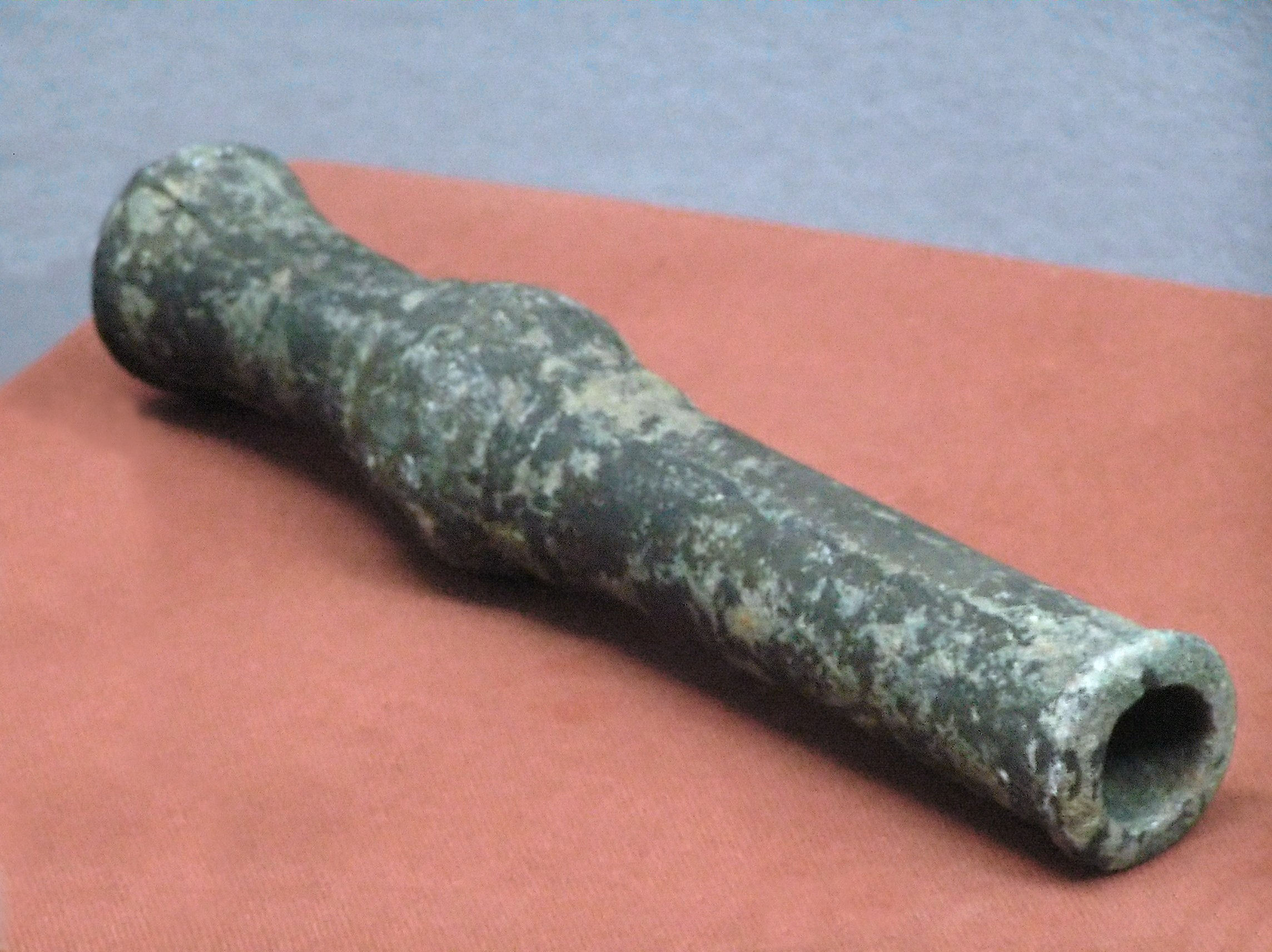
A bronze hand cannon that is thought to be originated from China.

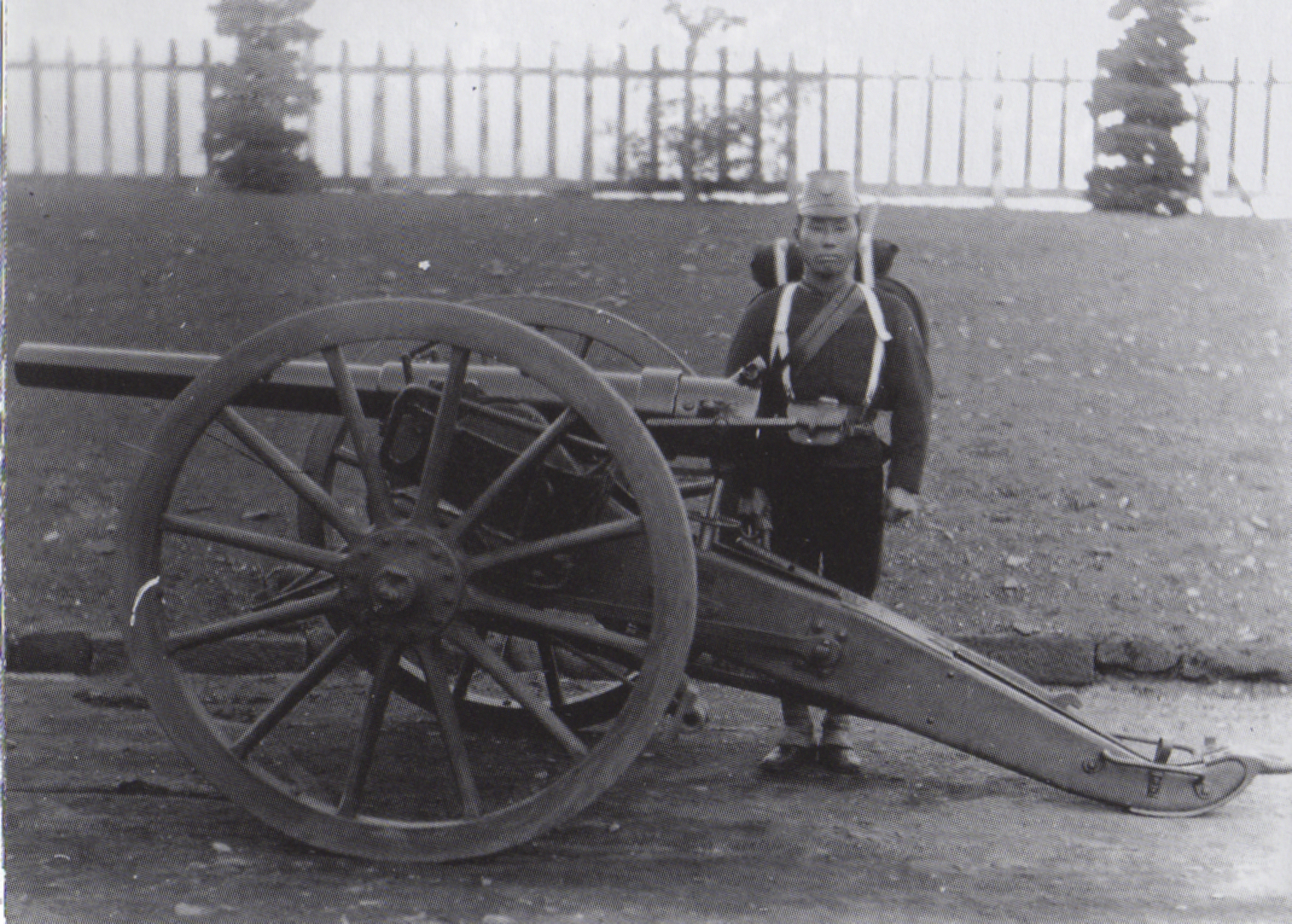
Japanese artillery unit, at the Koishikawa arsenal, Tokyo, in 1882. Photographed by Hugues Krafft

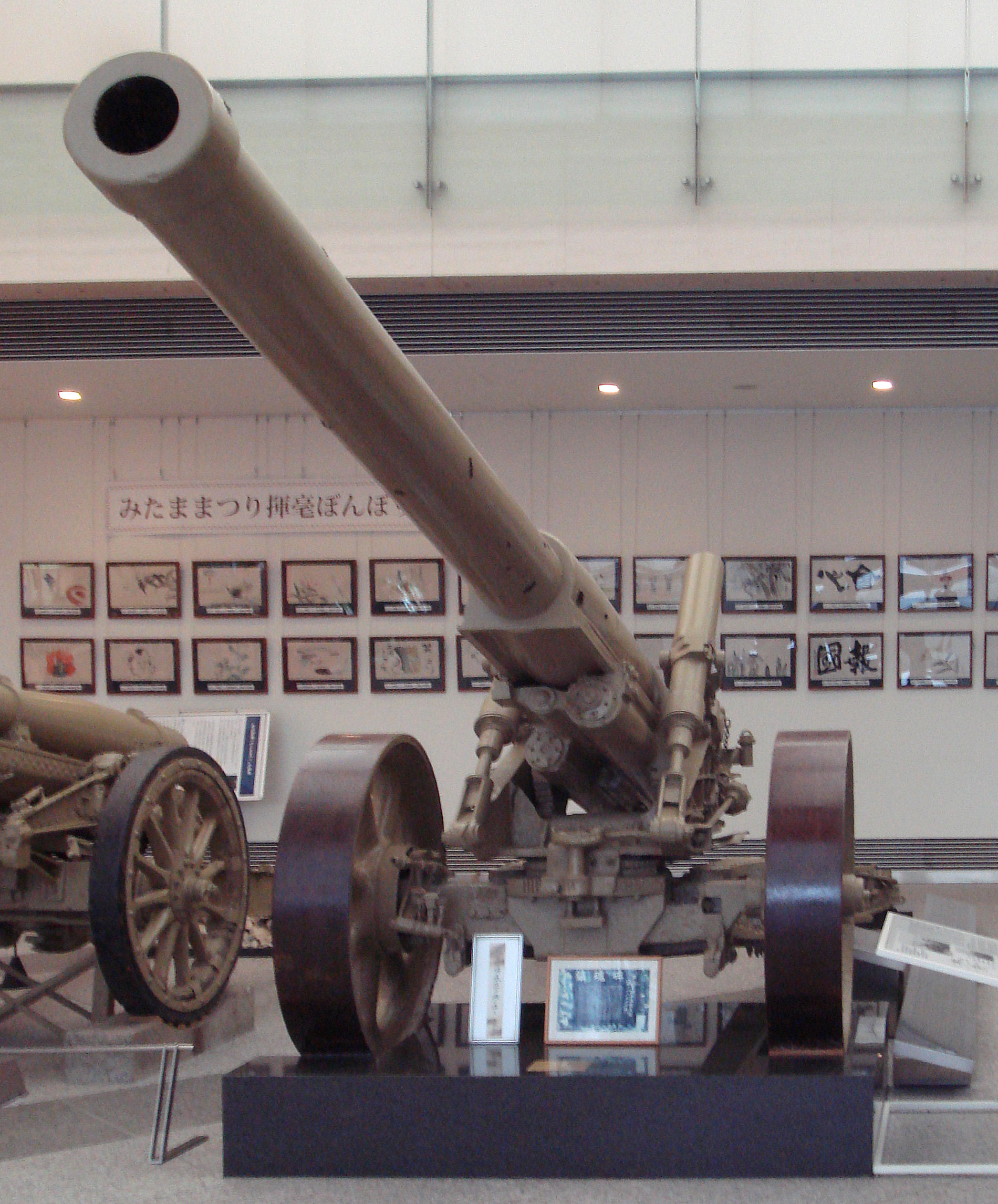
Japan's main heavy artillery unit during the Second World War, the Type 89 15 cm Cannon

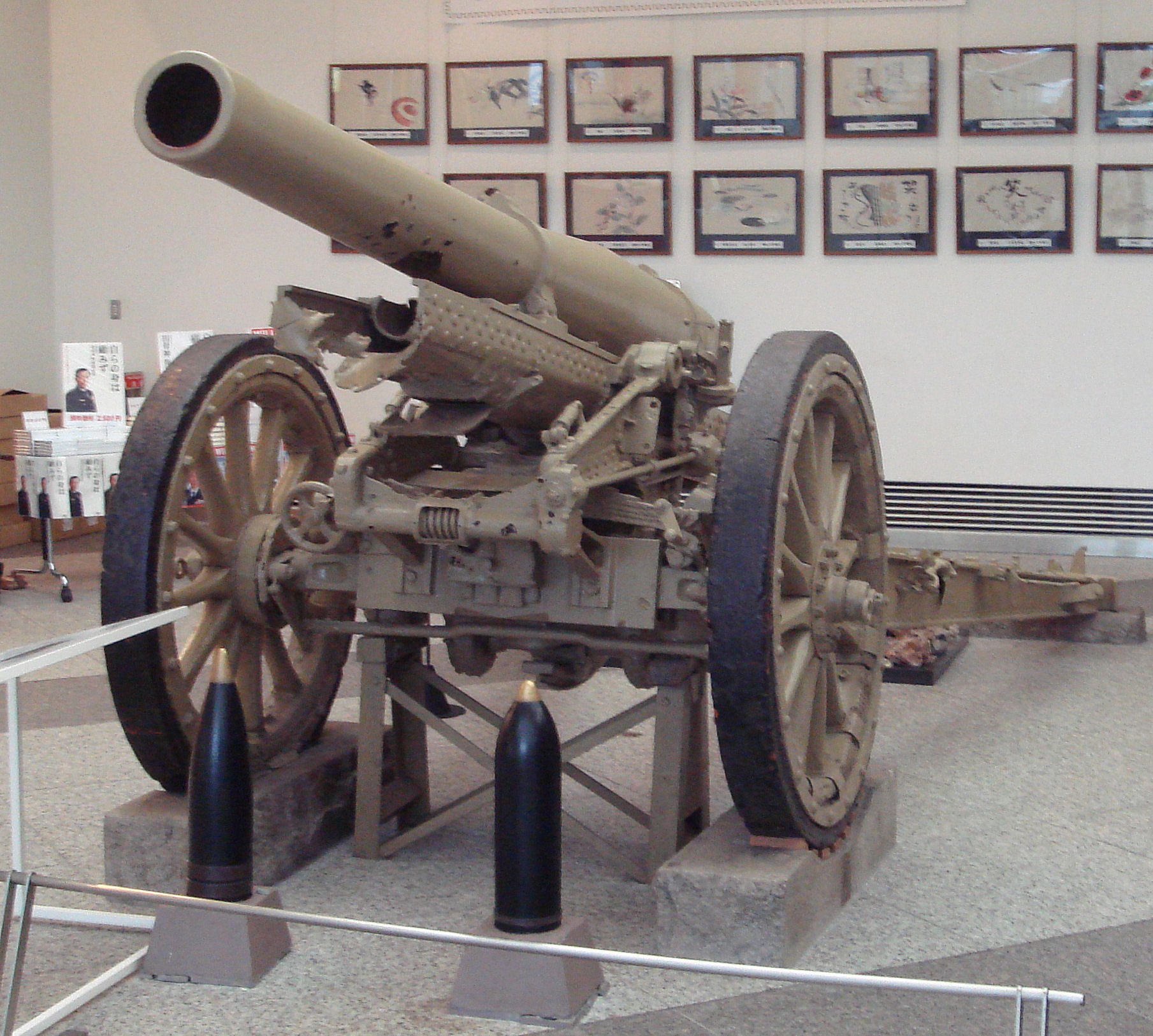
Model 96 (1936) 15cm howitzer

== See also ==
- Firearms of Japan
- Korean cannon
- List of artillery weapons of the Imperial Japanese Navy
