= Shadow Warrior (1997 video game) =

1997 video game

- Developers: 3D Realms; General Arcade (Classic Redux)
- Publishers: GT Interactive: Eidos Interactive (Europe); 3D Realms (Anthology Bundle); Devolver Digital (Classic, Classic Complete, Classic Redux); General Arcade (iOS)
- Designers: Frank Maddin; Jim Norwood
- Composer: Lee Jackson
- Series: Shadow Warrior
- Engine: Build
- Platforms: MS-DOS: Mac OS; Microsoft Windows; OS X; Linux; iOS; Android
- Release: May 13, 1997: MS-DOS; WW: May 13, 1997 (Shareware); WW: September 12, 1997 (Registered); Mac OS; WW: October 1, 1997; Classic Complete; WW: November 15, 2012; iOS; WW: December 19, 2012; Classic; WW: May 29, 2013; Classic Redux; WW: July 8, 2013; WW: May 19, 2017 (Android); 3D Realms Anthology Bundle; WW: October 23, 2014; WW: May 5, 2015 (Steam Edition)
- Genre: First-person shooter
- Modes: Single-player, multiplayer

Shadow Warrior is a first-person shooter video game developed by 3D Realms and published by GT Interactive. The shareware version was released for the PC on May 13, 1997, while the full version was completed on August 25, 1997 and released in stores on September 16, 1997. Shadow Warrior was developed using Ken Silverman's Build engine and improved on 3D Realms' previous Build engine game, Duke Nukem 3D. Mark Adams ported Shadow Warrior to Mac OS in August 1997.

The game's improvements included introduction of true room-over-room situations, the use of 3D voxels instead of 2D sprites for weapons and usable inventory items, transparent water, climbable ladders, and assorted vehicles to drive (some armed with weapons). Although violent, the game had its own sense of humor and contained some sexual themes. A combination of Shadow Warrior and Duke Nukem 3D: Atomic Edition was published by GT Interactive in March 1998, titled East Meets West.

In 2005, 3D Realms released the source code for Shadow Warrior (including compiled Build engine object code) under the GPL-2.0-or-later license, which resulted in the first source port a day later on April 2, 2005. In 2013, Devolver Digital announced the game would be free to obtain for a limited time on Steam. Later, Devolver Digital announced that they would permanently offer the game for free.

A reboot, also titled Shadow Warrior, was developed by Flying Wild Hog and published by Devolver Digital, launched on September 26, 2013.

== Plot ==
Lo Wang is a bodyguard and enforcer for Zilla Enterprises, a powerful conglomerate that controls every major industry in a futuristic Japan. Although he is aware of the unchecked corruption and crime that has resulted from Zilla Enterprises' dominance, Lo Wang is too content with his well-paid position to challenge his employers. This changes when Master Zilla, the company president who desires even more power and wealth, embarks on a plan to conquer Japan using creatures from the "dark side", having formed an alliance with the ancient deities that rule over them. When he discovers this, Lo Wang finds he can no longer stomach Zilla's evil and quits his job. Master Zilla soon realizes the threat that Lo Wang poses and orders the creatures to kill him.

Forced to fight for his life, Lo Wang manages to slaughter dozens of Zilla's minions until he discovers that Zilla also had his old mentor, Master Leep, murdered. Following his mentor's dying words, Lo swears to put an end to Zilla's schemes. The game ends with Lo Wang defeating Master Zilla, who tries and fails to kill him while piloting a massive war mech styled after a samurai. However, Zilla is able to escape, and informs his old bodyguard that they will meet again someday.

== Gameplay ==
Shadow Warrior gameplay

Shadow Warrior is a first-person shooter similar to Duke Nukem 3D and using the same Build engine. Players navigate the protagonist, Lo Wang, through three-dimensional environments or "levels". Throughout levels are enemies that attack Lo Wang, which can be killed by the player using weapons such as a katana. Shadow Warrior also features puzzles that must be solved to progress in various levels.

Lo Wang's arsenal of weaponry includes Japanese-themed weapons such as shurikens—which were "likely [to] be dropped in favor of [a] high tech fun weapon" in development—and a katana, and marked the first appearance of a sticky bomb in an FPS, an idea popularized later by Halo. It also includes guns such as Uzis, a riot gun that fires shotgun shells, and the Eraser-inspired railgun (Lo Wang frequently says "Time to get erased! Ha ha!" when picking up this weapon). In addition, the head and heart of certain enemies can be used as weapons.

Shadow Warrior was an ambitious game, containing many features not seen until later first-person shooter games. For example, the game features turrets and various vehicles (such as tanks) that the player can drive around freely in, climbable ladders, and multiple firing modes for various weapons.

== Development ==
Development of Shadow Warrior began in early 1994 as Shadow Warrior 3D, and preliminary screenshots were released with Hocus Pocus in May 1994. Jim Norwood came up with the game idea, George Broussard designed the character Lo Wang and Michael Wallin did some concept sketches.

Broussard in 1996 stated: "We want Shadow Warrior to surpass Duke Nukem 3D in features and gameplay and that's a TALL order." To this end, more tongue-in-cheek humor was added to the existing game in order to better match the style of the popular Duke Nukem 3D. The shareware version of Shadow Warrior was published in North America by GT Interactive on May 13, 1997, and the full version was published on September 12, 1997. At E3 1997, an area in the GT Interactive booth was dedicated to Shadow Warrior.

=== Soundtrack ===
Lee Jackson, who had already composed the soundtrack for Duke Nukem 3D also composed the soundtrack for Shadow Warrior. A Kurzweil K2500RS keyboard was used to produce the music. Shadow Warrior uses the audio tracks of the game's CD for music playback rather than the system's MIDI device, which allows for a higher general quality and the use of samples and effects not possible with MIDI music. This allowed Lee Jackson to include a wide variety of instruments which support the game's East Asian theme as well as to include ambient tracks which depend on advanced sound design. MIDI support including MIDI versions of five songs from the game's soundtrack was added exclusively to the shareware version which had to be kept small in size.

A special song called Lo Wang's Rap was included in one of the game disc's audio tracks. It was created out of sound bites and outtakes from recording sessions with John William Galt, the voice actor cast in the role of Lo Wang. This song was played during the credits sequence after completing the game. Jackson wrote and recorded a backing music track and then used a DAW to arrange the vocals over it in a way that made it sound like Lo Wang was actually rapping. The song was released as an MP3 on 3D Realms' website in 1999.

== Release ==
=== Versions ===
Shadow Warrior Classic Redux gameplay, featuring new HUD and OpenGL graphics

- Shadow Warrior Registered is the original 1.2 version released on September 12, 1997 for MS-DOS and on October 1, 1997 for Mac OS.
- Shadow Warrior Classic Complete is the PC version of Shadow Warrior that was released onto GOG.com and includes the main game and both expansion packs, Wanton Destruction and Twin Dragon. While the Steam version is free (see below), the GOG.com version used to be paid, and has a digital copy of the game's soundtrack in MP3 and FLAC and the game's manual delivered with the game. Published by Devolver Digital, it was released on November 15, 2012, using DOSBox to run on modern systems. Since September 2, 2016, with the release of Classic Redux on GOG, Classic Complete became free.
- Shadow Warrior (iOS) is the iOS version of Shadow Warrior that was ported and published by indie developer General Arcade. It was released on December 19, 2012 to the App Store.
- Shadow Warrior Classic (previously Shadow Warrior Original) is the original MS-DOS version of Shadow Warrior that was released onto Steam using DOSBox. It is free to play and includes the original registered version but does not include the expansion packs. Published by Devolver Digital, it was released on May 29, 2013.
- Shadow Warrior Classic Redux is a PC version of Shadow Warrior, released on GOG.com & Steam for Microsoft Windows, OS X and Linux with the main game and both expansion packs, Wanton Destruction and Twin Dragon. Developed by General Arcade and published by Devolver Digital, it was released on July 8, 2013 with improved, OpenGL graphics and visuals, remastered audio and modern PC compatibility.
- Shadow Warrior (Classic) is the PC version rebuilt with Microsoft Windows and OS X support, published by 3D Realms as part of the 3D Realms Anthology Bundle, it was released on October 23, 2014 on their own website and on May 5, 2015 on Steam.

=== Expansion packs ===
Two expansion packs, Wanton Destruction and Twin Dragon, were released. The third one, Deadly Kiss from SillySoft, remains unreleased, but screenshots were released in January 1998.

- Twin Dragon was released as a free download on July 4, 1998. It was created by Level Infinity and Wylde Productions. The game reveals that Lo Wang has a twin brother, Hung Lo, with whom he was separated in early childhood. Hung Lo becomes a dark person whose goal is to destroy the world. Similar to Master Zilla, he uses the creatures from the "dark side", criminal underworld and Zilla's remnants to further his goals. Lo Wang has to journey through his dark minions, reach his palace and defeat the evil Twin Dragon Hung Lo once and for all. The game features 13 new levels, new sounds, artwork and a new final boss, Hung Lo, who replaced Zilla.
- Wanton Destruction was created by Sunstorm Interactive and tested by 3D Realms, but was not released by the distributor. Charlie Wiederhold presented the four maps he created to 3D Realms, and was consequently hired as a level designer for Duke Nukem Forever. With permission, he released the maps on March 22, 2004. On September 5, 2005, Anthony Campiti—former president of Sunstorm Interactive—notified 3D Realms by e-mail that he found the Wanton Destruction add-on, and it was released for free on September 9, 2005. The add-on chronicles Lo Wang's adventures after the original game. He visits his relatives in USA, but is forced to fight off Zilla's forces again. The game culminates with a battle against Master Zilla above the streets of Tokyo, which ends with Master Zilla's death. The game features 12 new levels, new artwork and a couple of new enemy replacements, such as human enemies; though they still act as their original counterparts.

== Reception ==
Reception

Review scores
Publication	Score
Computer Games Strategy Plus	3.5/5
Computer Gaming World	2.5/5
Computer and Video Games	4/5
Edge	6/10
GamePro	4.5/5
GameSpot	7.2/10
Hyper	85%
PC Gamer (US)	75%
PC PowerPlay	80%
PC Zone	80%

NPD Techworld, a firm that tracked sales the United States, reported 118,500 units sold of Shadow Warrior by December 2002. The shareware version has been downloaded 400,000 times.

Reviews from critics are mostly positive and ratings vary from average to positive. Thierry Nguyen of Computer Gaming World commented: "Shadow Warrior is an average action game. While there are some good enhancements to the BUILD engine and some good level design and enemy AI, the rest of the game is mediocre." By contrast, GamePro said that "Shadow Warrior scores high in both style and level design. ... It's enhanced by a high difficulty level, a great audio soundtrack, and ambient music and environments you can can really believe exist ..." Tim Soete of GameSpot called it "a late entry into the realm of sprite-based action games that's pretty fun despite its dated qualities." AllGame editor Jason White described it as "a solid game" and "a keeper".

The game's depiction of Asian cultures has sparked some debate. One prominent example is an article published in Computer Gaming World in which Elliot Chin criticized the game on the basis of what he saw as insensitive and inauthentic representations of East Asian society and culture. Anthony Sze-Fai Shiu, an Assistant Professor of English at Springfield College, expressed similar concerns, especially as regards the game's portrayal of Japanese corporations as "rapacious" and "traditional". 3D Realms responded to this criticism by stating that they didn't intend to make a racist game, but had deliberately used a melange of Asian culture in order to create a "fun game" which "didn't take itself too seriously" and parodied "bad kung fu movies".

=== Legacy ===
3D Realms released the source code of the Shadow Warrior engine on April 1, 2005 under the GPL-2.0-or-later license. Due to the timing of the source code release, some users initially believed that it was an April Fools joke. The first source port, JFShadowWarrior, was created by Jonathon Fowler and released a day later on April 2, 2005, including Linux support and improvements from his JFDuke3D source port. It was later forked by Ben "ProASM" Smit for the SWP port. Shadow Warrior for iOS was released on December 19, 2012 by 3D Realms and indie developer General Arcade. Modern source ports for the game include WangGDX, VoidSW and its forks IcedSW and Raze.

The official website was created by Jeffrey D. Erb and Mark Farish of Intersphere Communications Ltd.

Two original novels featuring Lo Wang were published. For Dead Eyes Only was written by Dean Wesley Smith and You Only Die Twice by Ryan Hughes. The titles of the novels parody titles in the James Bond book series by Ian Fleming.
