= Wolfenstein: The Old Blood =

2015 video game

- Developer: MachineGames
- Publisher: Bethesda Softworks
- Director: Jonathan Heckley
- Producers: John Jennings; Lars Johansson
- Designers: Jerk Gustafsson; Jonathan Heckley; Arcade Berg
- Programmers: Anton Ragnarsson; Markus Buretorp
- Artists: Axel Torvenius; Tor Frick
- Writers: Tommy Tordsson Björk; Jerk Gustafsson; Jonathan Heckley
- Composer: Mick Gordon
- Series: Wolfenstein
- Engine: id Tech 5
- Platforms: PlayStation 4; Windows; Xbox One
- Release: WW: 5 May 2015 (digital); AU: 14 May 2015; EU: 15 May 2015; NA: 21 July 2015 (PS4, XONE)
- Genre: First-person shooter
- Mode: Single-player

Wolfenstein: The Old Blood is a first-person shooter video game developed by MachineGames and published by Bethesda Softworks. It was released on 5 May 2015 for PlayStation 4, Windows, and Xbox One. The game is a stand-alone title in the Wolfenstein series and a prequel expansion to 2014's Wolfenstein: The New Order, set in an alternate-history 1946. The single-player story follows war veteran William "B.J." Blazkowicz and his efforts to discover the locations of a Nazi compound. Development began in 2014, soon after the release of The New Order.

The game is played from a first-person perspective and its levels are navigated on foot. The story is arranged in chapters which players complete in order to progress, separated into two interconnected campaigns. The game features a variety of weapons, including pistols, shotguns, and explosives, most of which can be dual wielded. A cover system is also present; players lean in and out of cover instead of the more common system where players lock into cover.

Wolfenstein: The Old Blood received generally positive reviews. Many critics praised the game's intense firefights, intriguing locations, and the balance between stealth and action, but criticised the story.

== Gameplay ==
Wolfenstein: The Old Blood gameplay. Like The New Order, players assault AI-programmed hostiles such as this Panzerhund.

Wolfenstein: The Old Blood changes little from the basic gameplay of The New Order. As such, it is an action-adventure shooter game played from a first-person perspective. To progress through the story, players take on enemies while navigating through levels. The game utilizes a health system in which players' health is divided into separate sections, "health" and "armor", that regenerate. If an entire section is lost, players must find and use a health pack or body armor piece to replenish the missing health.

Players use melee attacks, firearms and explosives to fight enemies, and may run, jump and occasionally swim to navigate through the locations. Melee attacks can be used to silently take down enemies without being detected. Alternatively, players can ambush enemies, which will result in an intense firefight between the two parties. Enemy types vary; standard Nazi human soldiers, which vary in strength, robot-like characters known as Supersoldaten (Super Soldiers), giant mechanical dogs known as Panzerhunds, zombie-like Nazi soldiers and civilians known as Shamblers, and vicious dogs are some of the enemies players will encounter.

In combat, a cover system can be used as assistance against enemies. Players have the ability to lean around, over, and under cover, which can be used as a tactical advantage during shootouts and stealth levels. Players have access to a weapon inventory, which allows the player to carry as many weapons as they find. With some of these weapons, players have the ability to dual wield, giving them an advantage over enemies by dealing twice as much damage. The Old Blood adds various weapons that were not featured in The New Order, such as a steel pipe. The steel pipe is one of the biggest additions to the game; it consists of two small steel pipes which can be connected together to make a larger pipe. Both pipe states can be used as a melee attacks (each with their own animations) and in specific circumstances. The two small pipes, called "Pipes" in the weapon inventory, can be used to climb rock walls, and the large pipe, called "Pipe" in the inventory, is used to break open weak environmental surfaces. The game gives players a wide variety of weapon options—they can be found on the ground, retrieved from dead enemies, or removed from their stationary position and carried around. Weapon ammunition must be manually retrieved from the ground or from dead enemies.

As with The New Order, players can complete "Perks"; each Perk has a task the player can complete. Perks encourage the player to change their play style on the fly; collecting "helmets", getting silent kills, killing specific enemies a select number of times, getting a set number of kills with a specific weapon, and getting kills via explosives are some of the objectives. Once a Perk's task is complete, the player unlocks a bonus, such as more overall health or armor, more ammunition for a certain weapon, or the ability to gain health after a silent takedown. Various collectibles are also scattered throughout the levels; concept art, character models and bios, notes, which tell small side stories of the game, and gold bars are some of the collectibles.

Other modes in the game, differing from the main chapters, are Challenge Arenas and Nightmare Levels. Challenge Arenas unlock as the player progresses through the story and are accessed from the main menu. Being a basic arena battle mode, players fight waves of enemies to obtain a Bronze, Silver, or Gold medal. Nightmare Levels are accessed by finding and interacting with a bed that is hidden in each chapter. These levels take the form of levels from Wolfenstein 3D; the player moves through pixelated hallways, mostly equipped with just a pistol, fighting Nazi soldiers. The objective is to find a key that unlocks an elevator, which ends the Nightmare Level and returns the player to the main game.

== Plot ==
Wolfenstein: The Old Blood takes place in an alternate history 1946, just prior to the prologue of Wolfenstein: The New Order, with O.S.A. agents William "B.J." Blazkowicz (Brian Bloom) and Richard Wesley (taking up the codename Agent One) on a mission to infiltrate Castle Wolfenstein and obtain a top secret folder containing the location of SS-Oberst-Gruppenführer Wilhelm "Deathshead" Strasse from the castle's commander, Nazi archeologist and Obersturmbannführer Helga von Schabbs. Entering the castle disguised as Schutzstaffel officers, B.J. and Wesley fail to find the folder and are captured by Helga's lieutenant, Sturmbannführer Rudi Jäger, a massive and sadistic dog trainer who feeds captured prisoners to his mechanically augmented canines. While Wesley is dragged away by Rudi for interrogation, B.J. succeeds in escaping the prison cells and fighting his way through the castle. B.J. eventually locates Wesley strapped to an electric chair used by the Nazis for torture. Before B.J. can rescue Wesley, Rudi activates the chair and electrocutes him to death. Jäger then feeds Wesley's dead body to his prized albino dog, Greta, and straps B.J. into the chair to interrogate him. B.J. breaks free, injures Rudi, and kills Greta.

Escaping the castle, B.J. travels to the nearby village of Paderborn and meets up with the local German resistance leader, Ludwig Kessler, as well as Kessler's assistant Annette, a young Jewish girl whom Kessler is sheltering from the Nazis. Kessler's tavern is attacked by Nazi forces led by Rudi, wearing an experimental suit of power armor, whom B.J. defeats and kills. B.J., Kessler, and Annette flee via rowboat to the village of Wulfburg, where Helga is conducting an archeological excavation attempting to find a hidden underground vault containing occult knowledge previously possessed by King Otto I.

After meeting up with O.S.A. operative Pippa (codenamed Agent Two), B.J. disguises himself as a waiter and infiltrates the tavern where Helga is staying. Helga sees through B.J.'s disguise and briefly captures him, but a massive earthquake caused by the Nazis opening the vault forces her and her cohort, Obersturmführer Emmerich Schreiner, to escape to the excavation site and leave B.J. behind. The opening of the vault also releases a gas that causes anyone who dies within the vicinity of Wulfburg to reanimate as hostile zombies known as "shamblers". B.J. makes his way through the burning ruins of Wulfburg while fighting the zombified Nazis and civilians who died in the earthquake. Agent Two is killed by a shambler, and B.J. has to kill her again when she reanimates as one. Returning to Kessler and Annette, B.J. finds the two of them have left their hiding spot in an attempt to find and rescue Annette's friend, Katrin.

B.J. finds Annette and Kessler separated by a collapsing bridge and stranded on opposite buildings, and the player is given the choice of traveling to Annette's building or Kessler's building. The person B.J. travels to will be rescued by him, while the other person will be killed by the shamblers and then put down by B.J. when they reanimate. B.J. then travels to the dig site in pursuit of Helga, finally encountering her and Schreiner within King Otto's vault. There, he finds the source of the zombie-creating gas: an undead giant known as 'The Monstrosity', a creature created by King Otto's alchemists as a weapon of war, then sealed away by the king after deciding it was an abomination. Helga is initially successful in using Old High German commands to control the monster, but when she attempts to order it to eat B.J., the monster mortally wounds her and kills Schreiner instead. B.J. fights and kills The Monstrosity, then finally obtains the secret folder from the dying Helga. B.J. is extracted from Wulfburg by his friend Fergus Reid, and the two of them embark from RAF Kinloss to assassinate Deathshead and end the war, while B.J. thinks about the nature of monsters and hopes that he can finally rest after this one final mission.

== Development ==
The existence of Wolfenstein: The Old Blood was first acknowledged by Bethesda Softworks on 4 March 2015, through the release of an announcement trailer. Footage of the game was showcased at PAX East on 6–7 March 2015. Though initially announced to only be available digitally, it was later confirmed that the game would also receive a physical retail release in Europe, Australia and New Zealand.

The development team initially planned to create a series of individual downloadable content (DLC) packs, but later decided to change this to a standalone expansion pack. When this decision was made, development on two of the DLCs was already underway, and the team decided to merge the two DLCs into one standalone game. During this process, some members of the team experimented with creating artwork of the game in the style of movie posters from the 1960s, resulting in the inspiration to make the game have a "B movie vibe", though the game also took inspiration from films such as The Dirty Dozen (1967) and Where Eagles Dare (1968). The development team's decision to make the game a prequel was to allow players to experience the game without playing previous titles in the series. It also allowed the team to explore concepts that were mentioned in The New Order. For the game, the team aimed to focus on gameplay. "It's something you can just play through and immediately have fun", said executive producer Jerk Gustafsson. The team also tried to create different route possibilities within the combat spaces, offering a balance between stealth and action sequences.

At one point during the game, Blazkowicz encounters a group of inebriated Nazis singing in a tavern. Though the motion capture was performed by actors, the audio director requested that the voices be performed by members of the development team; to achieve an accurate performance, members of the team learned some German, and became inebriated prior to recording.

The team initially planned to reuse assets from The New Order in The Old Blood, but ultimately altered most assets in some way. Due to the team's focus on eighth generation consoles and PC, they were able to achieve some rendering updates, as well as the creation of larger and more detailed environments in the game. The game also intentionally included several references to Return to Castle Wolfenstein.

Wolfenstein: The Old Blood makes use of an original score composed by musician Mick Gordon, who also composed the soundtrack for The New Order. To create music with a style reflecting the game, Gordon performed with a string quartet, spending time manipulating a broken mandolin and cello. He also placed some items inside a piano, to create a unique sound.

For the German release of The Old Blood, all Nazi symbols and references were removed; it was a criminal offence to display Nazi imagery on toys in Germany at the time. The German software ratings board, Unterhaltungssoftware Selbstkontrolle, later introduced the "social adequacy clause", which allowed the use of such imagery in relevant scenarios, reviewed on a case-by-case basis. Bethesda made the uncensored international version (which lacks German as a language option) available for purchase in Germany on 22 November 2019, while continuing to sell the censored and localised version separately.

== Reception ==
Reception

Aggregate score
Aggregator	Score		
Aggregator	PC	PS4	Xbox One
Metacritic	76/100	76/100	75/100

Review scores
Publication	Score		
Publication	PC	PS4	Xbox One
Destructoid	N/A	N/A	8/10
Electronic Gaming Monthly	N/A	N/A	7.5/10
Famitsu	N/A	33/40	33/40
Game Informer	7.5/10	7.5/10	7.5/10
GameRevolution	4/5	N/A	N/A
GameSpot	7/10	N/A	N/A
GameTrailers	N/A	7.7/10	N/A
GameZone	7.5/10	7.5/10	7.5/10
IGN	7/10	7/10	7/10
PlayStation Official Magazine – UK	N/A	6/10	N/A
Official Xbox Magazine (UK)	N/A	N/A	7/10
PC Gamer (UK)	70%	N/A	N/A
Polygon	N/A	7/10	N/A
VideoGamer.com	8/10	N/A	N/A
The Daily Telegraph	N/A	4/5	N/A
Slant Magazine	N/A	3.5/5	N/A

Wolfenstein: The Old Blood received "generally favorable reviews" on all platforms according to the review aggregation website Metacritic.

Destructoid's Chris Carter praised the game for its brevity, saying that both episodes "don't waste as much time as some missions in [The New Order]. Both Castle Wolfenstein and Wulfburg are expansive enough to justify an entire game." He also said that "the development team does a good job of managing the pacing between stealth and action". Carter said that Helga Von Schabbs is a character that kept him "engaged" throughout the game, that he "slightly [preferred]" The Old Blood over The New Order, and that choosing to play the game is a "no-brainer".

Polygon's Justin McElroy complimented the game's action gameplay, stating that he liked the choice of weapons, the gunplay, and the mix of stealth and action, while being critical of the game for not having the components that made The New Order great. "The Old Blood suggests B-movie camp", McElroy said, "there are barely any moments where the action slows down enough to develop the type of characters and motivation that charged the big combat set pieces in [The] New Order".

Marty Sliva of IGN complimented the game's stealth puzzles, saying, "These scenes turn down the volume, but keep the tension high, as many enemies are able to tear you apart extremely quickly if you get caught." Sliva also "appreciated" the easter eggs referencing other Bethesda games, liked the firefights, which he called "satisfying", and praised the environment, which he said was "interesting". Sliva did, however, dislike the presence of zombies, the "weak" story, and having to manually pick up items. Sliva wrapped up his review by saying "Wolfenstein: The Old Blood doubles down on blood and guts, but in doing so sacrifices some of its heart."

PC Gamer UK's Chris Thursten said, "what was novel a year ago isn't necessarily novel now". He was mostly positive of the game's action gunplay, calling it "excellent". He said the Challenge arenas are also a good addition that he'd like to see in future Wolfenstein games. Most negative comments were related to The New Order, in Thursten's opinion, being superior to The Old Blood. Thursten said, "Nothing in The Old Blood exceeds what was achieved in The New Order, and there are moments when the two are uncannily similar".

GamesRadar+'s Andi Hamilton praised the game's shooting gameplay, calling it "satisfying", the "strong" pacing, the visuals, particularly the set pieces, which he called "beautiful", and the fact that it's a standalone game, Hamilton said it "works". Hamilton did, however, call the game's story "weak" compared to The New Order, and said certain stealth sections were "rough". Hamilton summarized his review by saying "Wolfenstein: The Old Blood is another sterling effort from MachineGames, fast proving to be real players in the FPS genre. This add-on clearly has smaller scope than was found in The New Order, keeping things much more 'down to Earth', but the core shooting experience that makes the reborn Wolfenstein such a pleasure to play remains perfectly intact. If you like shooting zombies and Nazis with extravagantly powerful weapons (and lets be honest here, who doesn't?) this is well worth checking out."

Matt Bertz of Game Informer said: "Had The Old Blood been injected with more new blood, maybe it would have matched or surpassed the quality of The New Order. But by over-relying on nostalgia to drive the experience, it's well-crafted fan service rather than an attempt to push the series in new directions. For a standalone expansion that's not an unforgivable offense, but we're excited to see what Machine Games can do with the series now that this genealogical exercise is flushed out of its system."

In Japan, where the Xbox One version was ported for release on 28 May 2015, followed by the PlayStation 4 version on 4 June 2015, Famitsu gave it a score of two eights, one nine, and one eight for a total of 33 out of 40.

Tom Hoggins of The Daily Telegraph gave the PS4 version four stars out of five and said, "For those that have played through The New Order and are keen for more of its beefy action, this delivers around 7 hours of it for a decent price. I'd argue The Old Blood also makes a satisfying starter to The New Order's more substantial meal if you haven't yet had a taste. A well-priced piece of downloadable content that works equally well on either side of the main game? Clever." David Jenkins of Metro gave the same console version eight out of ten and called it "A great follow-up to The New Order, which cleverly reuses all of its best features and yet still finds time to add plenty of new elements of its own." Justin Clark of Slant Magazine gave it three-and-a-half stars out of five and called it "a wonderful palate cleanser, something to undo long-standing wrongs before diving in to a much deeper, gratifying installment. The conundrum is that the people who already know what MachineGames is capable of with this series have seen the future, and The Old Blood doesn't provide all that compelling a reason to return to the past." Christopher Byrd of The Washington Post gave the same console version an average review and said, "The game's B-movie vibe is evocative of the work of those skilled filmmakers who embrace the silly or even the self-consciously stupid." Steve Tilley of Toronto Sun similarly gave the same console version a mixed review and stated, "The Old Blood is just OK. It's a great deal for the price – as a $25 digital download via the PlayStation Store, the Xbox Games Store and Steam, it's a rarity in an era when 25 bucks might get you a couple map packs' worth of downloadable content – but I've discovered there's such a thing as too old-school." Drew Toal of The A.V. Club gave the same console version a mixed review and said that it "just feels a little gratuitous". Ebenezer Samuel of New York Daily News gave the Xbox One version three stars out of five and called it "a less weighty experience overall".
