= Wolfenstein 1-D =

2011 video game

- Designer: Mike Lacher
- Platform: Adobe Flash
- Release: January 24, 2011
- Genre: Shooter
- Mode: Single-player

Wolfenstein 1-D is a demake of the video game Wolfenstein 3D created by American developer Mike Lacher that features the game in a minimalist one-dimensional style. It features the same character, William "B.J." Blazkowicz, and plot from the 1992 video game, but in a single line of pixels, where different colored pixels denote doors, enemies, ammo, health, and fired bullets. The game received overall positive reviews, along with comments about whether it was meant to be taken as a critique on modern 3D gaming.

== Gameplay ==
Screenshot

Players control the Wolfenstein series' protagonist, William "B.J." Blazkowicz, and must try to escape from the Nazi-controlled Wolfenstein Castle. Along the way Blazkowicz must defeat guards and loot treasure, opening doors in order to progress. Blazkowicz, enemies, treasure, ammunition and life-restoring health packs are all represented by different colored pixels. Enemies either have the ability to fire single shots, or wield automatic rifles.

== Reception ==
Video game blog Joystiq commented that, "We're sure there's probably a message about the lack of real depth in the storytelling of most first person shooters, though it was totally lost on us, because we were busy having such a good time shooting things." MTV writer, Adam Rosenberg said, "I can't tell if it's actually entertaining to play or if I'm just enjoying the groovy beats of the original game playing behind it... You'll probably only play it once, but it's definitely worth spending a minute or so of your day on. Maybe your life won't be enriched, but is finding new and interesting ways of killing Nazis ever really a bad thing?" Chris Plante for IFC asked, "Is "Wolfenstein 1D" a subtle jab at the choking linearity of modern first-person shooters? Games like "Call of Duty" provide a controlled path, like an amusement park ride, that create the illusion of danger, when in reality every enemy is placed before your muzzle and every loss of life can be remedied by the nearest health pack." Kotaku writer, Michael McWhertor, said, "Thrill as you walk to the right, shooting blue and orange lines (Nazis!), opening cyan lines that represent doors and desperately hoping for a magenta line to appear when you're down to your last bullet. If you truly do not care about graphics, play Wolfenstein 1D." George Wong for tech website Ubergizmo stated, "Words aren't going to do justice in describing this game, but if you've ever played Wolfenstein 3D before, you should experience it for yourself."

Wired writer Duncan Geere commented on the 2D versus 1D argument by saying, "Oh, and if we're being pedants, then yes, it does have a second dimension — which is just 1 pixel tall. Still, projecting that onto our screens and quantizing it into pixels means you can just about get away with the characterization." GamesRadar writer, Matt Bradford, also commented on the 1D style, saying, "1-D gaming might not require special glasses or expensive TVs to enjoy, but it does require good eyesight and a hefty degree of imagination. Maybe the DLC will include a second layer?" Rock Paper Shotgun writer, Jim Rossignol, asked in a short review, "Just because something can be made doesn't mean you should make it. That said, Wolfenstein 1-D is surprisingly good. Is this the true essence of gaming?"

== Notes ==
- Erwan Cario (January 25, 2011). "Wolfenstein 1-D". Libération. Archived from the original on January 28, 2011. (English)
- "Spielt den Klassiker in 1-D". Gamona.de. January 26, 2011. (English)
- Alvaro Cordova Castilian (January 25, 2011). "Los aficionados crean Wolfenstein 1-D como homenaje al clásico de id Software". 3D Juegos. (English)
