= Wolfenstein RPG =

2008 video game

- Logo
- Developer(s): id Software; Fountainhead Entertainment
- Publisher(s): EA Mobile
- Director(s): Katherine Anna Kang
- Producer(s): Katherine Anna Kang
- Designer(s): Matthew C. Ross
- Programmer(s): John Carmack
- Composer(s): Matthew C. Ross; Christian Antkow
- Series: Wolfenstein
- Platform(s): Java ME, BREW, iOS
- Release: Java ME, BREW; September 30, 2008 iOS; May 11, 2009
- Genre(s): Role-playing, first-person shooter
- Mode(s): Single-player

Wolfenstein RPG is a 2008 role-playing video game developed by id Software and Fountainhead Entertainment and published by EA Mobile. It was initially released for Java ME and BREW, before being ported to iOS the following year.

== Plot ==
While the original Wolfenstein 3D contained Nazi castles full of swastikas and sour-looking Hitler portraits, Wolfenstein RPG is decidedly lighter in tone, with mutant chickens, romance novels, and a playful giant named Gunther. Sgt. William "B.J." Blazkowicz of the Wolfenstein series of video games, is being held captured by the Axis military. He must now escape his captors and try to save the world by defeating the Paranormal Division. To stop the Axis' diabolically evil Paranormal Division, he must escape prison, navigate towns, and infiltrate Castle Wolfenstein. On his way he can use tools and items he comes across such as boots, fist and toilets. He will inflict serious damage with weapons such as a flamethrower, a rocket launcher, and a Tesla.

== Gameplay ==
The gameplay follows the recipe from Doom RPG as it is shown in the first person while being a turn-based role-playing game rather than a shooter and puts emphasis on the plot. Combat and movement are turn-based, allowing the player time to select their responses in combat. The player turns at 90 degree angles and moves space by space. One step or action by the player allows all other characters in the area to take one step or action themselves. The game takes advantage of its deliberately slow pace, encouraging players to take their time and check out every little corner, read the books on every bookshelf, and destroy all the furniture to see if anything is hidden within. Levels include underground passages and weapon development laboratories plus a level involving a moving vehicle.

The game also includes two mini games: the card game War as well as Chicken Kicking, where the player is awarded points for kicking a chicken into a score area.

== Development ==
The development of Wolfenstein RPG was a long and difficult task involving id Software, Firemint Software and Electronic Arts and many months of development. The mobile version was released in late 2008. EA Mobile announced the availability of Wolfenstein RPG on August 14, 2009, a new take on the classic game originally created by id, on the App Store. Wolfenstein RPG is a worldwide release to all territories that host the iTunes App Store, including Germany. It is compatible with iPhone and iPod touch and the minimum requirement is iPhone OS 2.2.1 or later. Wolfenstein RPG is the fourth generation of turn-based titles under EA Mobile. John Carmack, founder and technical director at id Software, said that "the App Store version is dramatically better than on any other platform, with by an order of magnitude more media in high resolution graphics and audio, all rendered fast and smooth with hardware OpenGL graphics acceleration."

The game was available for most JRE-capable mobile phones, as well as the various iDevices. The mobile versions and the iOS version have some differences, but they are all largely the same game except that the iOS version has improved sound and graphics, and is more accessible to most gamers than the JRE version. The iPhone version recycles a lot of sound and music from Return to Castle Wolfenstein but the graphics are all new, taking on an exaggerated comic book style similar to Orcs & Elves. It is different from id Software's Wolfenstein Classic. Wolfenstein Classic is a fast-paced retro FPS, while Wolfenstein RPG is a turn-based action RPG that sees you exploring Castle Wolfenstein square by square. It is much like id's other casual RPGs Doom RPG and Orcs 'n' Elves.

== Reception ==
Reception

Aggregate score
Aggregator	Score
GameRankings	87.50%

Review score
Publication	Score
IGN	8.5/10

Wolfenstein RPG has received generally favorable reviews upon its release, holding a score of 87.50% on GameRankings based on a dozen reviews by major video game critics. The game was praised for its weapon variation, humour, slow turn base pace, and attention to detail, classic Wolfenstein style, RPG elements nicely blended in, while the lack of animation design were pointed out as the shortcomings. Appspy gives the game a rate of 5 which means great. It describes its advantages as "controls work well", "very user friendly", "looks and sounds great", "remains uniquely Wolfenstein while being updated". IGN gave the game 8.5/10 with IGN's Levi Buchanan praising the game for its "more cartoon-y than the mobile game", "the art direction." and he calls it a "polished production". Pocket Gamer reviewed the game 8/10. It points out the unique of the game which is "a distinctly different pace" and "wonderful black humour".
