= Wolfenstein: The New Order (soundtrack) =

2014 soundtrack

Wolfenstein: The New Order (Original Game Soundtrack)

Soundtrack album by Mick Gordon
- Released: May 19, 2014
- Genre: Soundtrack, Industrial rock, Heavy metal
- Length: 51:45
- Label: Bethesda Softworks

Wolfenstein: The New Order (Original Game Soundtrack) is the soundtrack to the video game Wolfenstein: The New Order. The soundtrack was released on 19 May 2014, consisting of an original score featured in the game. Composer Mick Gordon took inspiration from multiple sources while producing the soundtrack, ultimately creating over six hours of music. Critical reception to the soundtrack was positive, as reviewers considered that the music had been appropriated effectively for gameplay.

== Background and recording ==
Wolfenstein: The New Order makes use of an original score that reflects the alternate universe depicted in the game. "We wanted to identify with different sounds that were kind of iconic, 1960s sounds, and then do our own twist on them to make a sound authentic enough that it felt realistic," said Pete Hines, Vice President of PR and Marketing for publisher Bethesda Softworks. Developer MachineGames placed a high importance on the game's music, and aimed for a high standard. During the game's development, composer Mick Gordon travelled to Sweden to meet with MachineGames, and spotted the game over three days, partly collaborating with both Fredrik Thordendal and Richard Devine. Gordon expressed the difference in composing the soundtrack for Wolfenstein: The New Order compared to other games; "usually you sign onto a project and then you're given a list of 150 battle cues to do," he said.

"The New Order"
"The New Order", the game's main theme, was composed by Mick Gordon.

When searching for a genre in which the soundtrack would be based upon, the development team initially sought inspiration from the music of Richard Wagner, who was posthumously admired by Nazi Party leader Adolf Hitler; the game is set in an alternate history in a world where the Nazis won the Second World War. After studying Wagner's work, the team discovered that it didn't necessarily fit with the game's tone. The team then looked for a style of music that would suit the Nazis, ultimately selecting distortion. "There's lots of analogue distortion types, there's all sorts of different pedals and valves and things that are really breaking up," said Gordon. The team also took inspiration from 1960s music, using analogue equipment such as tape machines and reel-to-reel machines. Gordon has said that the soundtrack is "a tribute to all things guitar". In collaboration with each other, the team of musicians composed over six hours of music which scores the game. Jens Matthies, creative director of the game, said "A lot of the score features odd time signatures yet it's all very groovy."

== Critical reception ==
In the context of the game, Wolfenstein: The New Order Original Game Soundtrack was well received. John Galbo of GeekNation called the soundtrack "amazing", likening parts of it to the music of Wolfenstein 3D. Dennis Scimeca of Ars Technica considered the score an appropriate choice during gameplay, and Chris Thursten of PC Gamer agreed that the music is "far more than you might expect". Tim Blevins of MusicReview felt that the soundtrack was "outstanding", praising Fredrik Thordendal's contribution to the soundtrack. Conversely, Matt Bertz of Game Informer felt that the "chugging, unimaginative guitar riffs get old quickly".

== Track listing ==
All tracks are written by Mick Gordon.

No.	Title	Length
1.	"Deathshead"	1:40
2.	"Adrift"	1:46
3.	"The New Order"	3:43
4.	"14 Years"	1:21
5.	"Frau Engel"	2:26
6.	"Papers, Please"	2:10
7.	"Kill Everyone"	2:18
8.	"Concrete for Miles"	1:51
9.	"Zellenblock B-2"	2:09
10.	"The Kreisau Circle"	1:23
11.	"London Nautica"	2:49
12.	"Konzentrationslager"	3:07
13.	"Herr Faust" (with Fredrik Thordendal)	2:55
14.	"Der Mond"	5:03
15.	"Kybernetik" (with Richard Devine)	2:06
16.	"Ransacked"	5:04
17.	"Prototype"	3:44
18.	"Ende"	6:10
Total length:		51:45
