= Return to Castle Wolfenstein =

2001 video game

- Developer: Gray Matter Studios (Note: Nerve Software developed the multiplayer mode and the Xbox version. Splash Damage assisted in developing the multiplayer mode. Raster Productions developed the PS2 version. Westlake Interactive developed the Mac version.)
- Publishers: Activision; Aspyr (Mac OS X)
- Director: Drew Markham
- Designer: Richard Farrelly
- Programmer: Sherman Archibald
- Artist: Michael Kaufman
- Writer: Steve Goldberg
- Composer: Bill Brown
- Series: Wolfenstein
- Engine: id Tech 3
- Platforms: AmigaOS 4 Windows; Linux; Mac OS; Mac OS X Xbox; PlayStation 2
- Release: November 21, 2001: Microsoft Windows; NA: November 21, 2001; EU: November 30, 2001 Linux March 16, 2002 Mac OS / Mac OS X; NA: April 29, 2002 Xbox; NA: May 6, 2003; EU: May 15, 2003 PlayStation 2; NA: May 30, 2003; EU: June 6, 2003
- Genre: First-person shooter
- Modes: Single-player, multiplayer

Return to Castle Wolfenstein is a 2001 first-person shooter game developed by Gray Matter Studios and published by Activision. It was initially released for Microsoft Windows and subsequently for the PlayStation 2 (as Return to Castle Wolfenstein: Operation Resurrection), Xbox (as Return to Castle Wolfenstein: Tides of War), Linux, and Macintosh in the following years. The game serves as a reboot of the Wolfenstein series. id Software, the developers of Wolfenstein 3D, oversaw the development and were credited as executive producers.

Upon release, Return to Castle Wolfenstein received a generally favorable reception, with critics praising the visual presentation and design of the game's open-ended levels in its single-player campaign and quality of its multiplayer gameplay. However, critics considered the game was not as innovative or impactful as the design of its predecessor, and expressed that its narrative and themes were unoriginal. Splash Damage created some of the maps for the Game of the Year edition. A sequel, titled Wolfenstein, was released in 2009.

== Gameplay ==
Return to Castle Wolfenstein is a first-person shooter in which the player navigates levels and fights enemies including Nazi soldiers, undead, and experimental mutants. The player acquires weapons and ammo throughout levels, including for pistols, submachine guns, rifles, grenades, rockets, flamethrowers, and experimental weapons including the Venom, a minigun, and the Tesla Gun, which shoots electricity at enemies. Some weapons have alternate fire modes, such as rifles that have a scope, or shoot projectiles. The player can also engage in melee combat by either kicking or using a knife. Damage is location-specific, with headshots damaging enemies more than other areas. Special items can be collected that increase the player's health, ammo, armor, or stamina.

In the game's single-player mode, players use combat and stealth to complete objectives across 27 levels in 7 missions. Missions begin with a mission briefing, providing information about objectives, and may include activities such as reaching the end of an area, defeating all the enemies, collecting certain items, eliminating specific enemies, or stealth missions. Mission levels contain secrets and treasure in hidden areas, with completion of the level informing the player if all have been discovered. Several missions and the endgame also feature more difficult boss battles. The player can review objectives and mission information in their notebook, as well as collect notes or read clipboards and letters throughout the levels that provide background information.

Stealth missions require players to sneak and take cover through levels to avoid enemy detection. Guards in these levels will independently patrol the area and have their own routines. When enemies detect a player, they will be alerted and sound an alarm at an alarm box, causing other enemies to appear. Players can take down enemies from behind whilst sneaking if undetected. Some stealth missions lead to failure if enemies sound an alarm.

=== Multiplayer ===
Multiplayer is an objective-based game mode, in which players are split into two teams—Axis and Allies. Each team has a set of objectives to complete, the Allies usually being to destroy some sort of Axis objective, and the Axis objectives being to defend their objectives. These objectives are split into two categories, primary and secondary. Primary objectives are ones which must be completed for victory, generally stealing secret documents or destroying a radar array; however, secondary objectives are ones which are optional—they do not have to be completed, but if they are they may aid the appropriate team, such as blowing out a door to allow access into a tunnel which shortens travel time or allows less-noticeable infiltration of the enemy base.

Each team has access to a slightly different set of weapons, matching those used by each side in World War II. Players can choose from four different classes: Soldier, Medic, Engineer and Lieutenant. Soldiers can carry heavy weapons, such as the Panzerfaust, Venom Cannon or Flamethrower, which are not available to other classes. Medics can revive and heal other teammates. Engineers can breach obstacles and arm and defuse dynamite. Lieutenants can supply ammo to teammates and are able to call in air strikes.

Each class specializes in a certain aspect of the game, and an effective team will balance players out using all four classes, such as soldiers for blasting through enemy defenses, medics for supporting the team and keeping them alive, Lieutenants to resupply teammates with ammo, and engineers to complete the objective.

There are three different modes of play, each allowing for a different experience—objective, stopwatch, and checkpoint. Stopwatch calls for the Allied side to complete a set of objectives within a predefined time limit. The opposing team then become the Allies and have to complete the objectives in a shorter time than the now Axis. Checkpoint gamemode is a mode in which teams capture flags. It may be more commonly known as Capture the Flag (CTF). Whichever team is first to control all the flags at once, wins. The team-based networked multiplayer features different character classes that must work together in order to win. There are four classes — lieutenant, medic, engineer, and soldier — the soldier can be one of several subclasses depending upon the special/heavy weapon that he selects. The multiplayer demo includes a beachhead assault map similar to Omaha Beach.

== Plot ==
In 1943, assigned to the Office of Secret Actions (OSA) from the military, US Army Ranger William "B.J." Blazkowicz and British operative Agent One are sent to Egypt to investigate the activity of the German SS Paranormal Division. The duo find themselves witness to the SS releasing an ancient curse around the dig site, resurrecting scores of zombies from their slumber. Pushing through the mummies and Nazis, B.J. and Agent One are led to an airfield and a location to follow. As they tail the SS, the two are shot down near Austria and captured by the Nazis. Agent One and Blazkowicz are imprisoned in Castle Wolfenstein, a remote, medieval castle that serves as a stronghold, prison, and research station. During their incarceration, Agent One is tortured for information and dies from electrocution. B.J., however, manages to escape Castle Wolfenstein's dungeon and fights his way out of the castle, using a cable car to leave the area and meet up with Kessler, a member of the German resistance in a nearby village.

Meanwhile, the SS Paranormal Division, under Oberführer Helga von Bülow, has long since moved from Egypt and has been excavating the catacombs and crypts of an ancient church within the village itself in search of the resting place of a "Dark Knight". The Division's sloppy precautions have led to the release of an ancient curse and the awakening of hordes of undead creatures, this time including Saxon knights. The majority of the SS finally realize the dangers and seal off the entrance into the catacombs, leaving many soldiers trapped inside. B.J. descends regardless and fights both Nazis and undead until he arrives at the ancient house of worship, the Defiled Church, where Nazi scientist Professor Zemph is conducting a 'life essence extraction' on the corpse of a Dark Knight, which, thanks to some Nazi technology, succeeds. Shortly before B.J.'s arrival, Zemph tries to talk the impatient Helga von Bulow out of retrieving an ancient Thulian artifact, the "Dagger of Warding" from a nearby altar in an isolated area of the church, but she shoots him and proceeds. This final blunder awakens another monster, Olaric, which kills and dismembers her. Blazkowicz, after a heated battle against spirits and demon attacks, defeats Olaric, and then is airlifted out with Zemph's notes and the dagger.

With the lead on Helga seeming to have come to a close, the OSA begins to shift its focus to one of Germany's leading scientific researchers and Head of the SS Special Projects Division, Oberführer Wilhelm "Deathshead" Strasse. Their investigation leads the OSA to realizing that Deathshead is preparing to launch an attack on London. He intends to use a V-2 rocket fitted with an experimental biological warhead, launching it from his base near Katamarunde in the Baltics. Due to the stealthy nature in which the OSA needs to act, Blazkowicz is parachuted some distance from the missile base and separated from his equipment. After collecting his gear, he smuggles himself into a supply truck bound for the base. Once inside, Blazkowicz destroys the V-2 on its launchpad and fights his way out of the facility towards an airbase filled with experimental jet aircraft. There, he commandeers a "Kobra" rocket-plane and flies to safety in Malta.

Eager to know more about Deathshead and his secret projects, the OSA sends Blazkowicz to the bombed-out city of Kugelstadt, where he is assisted by members of the German Kreisau Circle resistance group in breaking into a ruined factory and exfiltrating a defecting scientist. It is there he discovers the blueprints and prototype of the Reich's latest weapon, an electrically operated hand-held minigun dubbed the Venom Gun. Blazkowicz eventually breaks into Deathshead's underground research complex, the Secret Weapons Facility. There he encounters the horrific fruits of Deathshead's labors: creatures malformed and twisted through surgery and mechanical implants. The creatures escape from their containments and go on a rampage. Blazkowicz fights his way through the facility, only to see Deathshead escape the chaos by U-boat, and learns of his destination by interrogating a captured German officer.

Blazkowicz is then parachuted into Norway, close to Deathshead's mysterious "X-Labs." After breaking into the facility, which has been overrun by the twisted creatures he encountered in Kugelstadt (dubbed 'Lopers'), Blazkowicz retrieves Deathshead's journal, which links Deathshead's research to the rest of the SS Paranormal's occult activity. Finally catching up with Deathshead, Blazkowicz comes face to face with a completed and fully armored Übersoldat, and kills the researchers who have developed it. After the Übersoldat is destroyed, Deathshead escapes in a Kobra rocket-plane and disappears for the rest of the game.

After studying the documents captured by Blazkowicz, the OSA has become aware of a scheme codenamed 'Operation: Resurrection', a plan to resurrect Heinrich I, a legendary and powerful Saxon warlock-king from 943 AD. Despite the skepticism of senior Allied commanders, the OSA parachutes Blazkowicz back into the vicinity of Castle Wolfenstein, at the Bramburg Dam, ending up at the village town of Paderborn. After assassinating all the senior officers of the SS Paranormal Division present there for the resurrection, Blazkowicz shoots his way through Chateau Schufstaffel and emerges into the grounds beyond. After fighting two more Übersoldaten, Blazkowicz enters an excavation site near Castle Wolfenstein.

Inside the excavation site, Blazkowicz fights Nazi guards and prototype Übersoldaten, and makes his way to a boarded-up entrance to Castle Wolfenstein's underground crypts. There, he finds that the ruined and decaying sections of the castle have become infested with undead creatures, which are attacking the castle's garrison. After battling through the underworkings of the castle, Blazkowicz arrives too late to prevent a dark ceremony resurrecting Heinrich I. There, SS psychic and Oberführerin Marianna Blavatsky conjures up dark spirits which transform three of Deathshead's Übersoldaten into Dark Knights, Heinrich's lieutenants. She ultimately raises Heinrich I, who turns her into his undead slave. Blazkowicz destroys the Dark Knights, the undead Marianna Blavatsky, and eventually Heinrich I. In the distance, Reichsführer-SS Heinrich Himmler remarks how matters have been ruined as he leaves for Berlin to face an expectant Hitler.

Back in the OSA, Operation Resurrection is closed and Blazkowicz is off on some "R&R" — shooting Nazis.

== Development and release ==
=== Development ===
Many textures in Return to Castle Wolfenstein were sourced from photographs of European towns and castles.

Development on a sequel to Wolfenstein 3D was pitched to id Software by Gray Matter Studios. The studio was composed of former staff of Xatrix Entertainment, who had developed Redneck Rampage, Kingpin: Life of Crime and the 1998 mission pack The Reckoning for id Software's Quake II. To support the pitch, a demo was created set outside a castle that demonstrated the enemy AI and a feature involving enemies setting off an alarm when detecting the player. id Software CEO Todd Hollenshead stated that the studio had been searching for a development team to revive the series and the pitch was "jaw-dropping" and "captured the imagination of what the potential could be for a modern Wolfenstein". The game's publisher, Activision, invested in a 40 per cent equity stake of Grey Matter.

Return to Castle Wolfenstein was announced in January 2000. id Software provided "significant involvement" to Grey Matter with guidance on animation, art and research, with the studio stating they were in contact with John Carmack and the id Software team "on a regular basis". However, id Software had limited creative interference in the studio's vision for the game, beyond "direction in keeping the game true to the universe. Activision extended the development window beyond the planned release date of Christmas 2000 to ensure the game's quality.

The game was designed in the id Tech 3 engine developed for Quake III, the fourth game to use the engine. The development team used terrain tools in the Quake III expansion Team Arena to create complex interiors for the castle and large outdoor environments, which led to further delays. This approach supported the creation of "enormous maps" and allowed the team to design levels that offered multiple paths to the player to complete a mission. Levels were designed to showcase the game's "dynamic" scripting system for enemy behavior, who would patrol areas, react to dead enemies or noise, sound alarms or call for reinforcements. Additional features, including dragging dead bodies, silent attacks, and exchanging uniforms, were tested and removed to "significantly simplify" the game to make it "easier to play".

Design of the game took reference from Wolfenstein 3D, with the developers' aim to create an interpretation of the original game as a "semi-retelling" rather than a direct sequel. The studio dispensed with several elements from the original game they viewed as unenjoyable, including key cards and save points, and prioritised improving the action elements of the game, including enemy AI and scripted behaviors. The developers also undertook research into the World War 2 era to create the visual design for the game. Photographs of castles, cobblestones, and other visual elements were used by the team from two visits to Europe to create textures of the game's German setting. However, the studio aimed to balance plausible historical depiction with "mysterious and bizarre" elements for entertainment value, with creative director Drew Markham describing the game as "World War 2 meets The X-Files". Supernatural elements were inspired by Wewelsburg, a castle used by Heinrich Himmler and associated with occult rituals and practices. The castle and cable car also bear close similarities to the 1968 war film Where Eagles Dare.

=== Release ===
Return to Castle Wolfenstein was released on November 21, 2001, for Windows. The game was released for Linux and Macintosh platforms in 2002, with the Linux port done in-house by Timothee Besset and the Mac port done by Aspyr Media. In 2003, the game was ported to the PlayStation 2 and Xbox video game consoles and subtitled as Operation Resurrection and Tides of War, respectively.

Both console versions include an additional single-player prequel mission, set in the fictional town of Ras El-Hadid in Egypt. The latter half of the level features an extensive underground burial site with many undead enemies, as does the original first mission. This prequel level is likely closer to the developers' true intentions for the story, as indicated by the distinctly Egyptian design of the burial site, including the presence of sand, traps, mummies and hieroglyphs on the walls in some areas (in the original storyline, this site is found in the middle of a German village during the second mission). By contrast, the single-player storyline in the Windows version starts at Castle Wolfenstein. The PS2 version has a bonus feature which allows players to purchase items at the end of each level by finding secrets. In the Xbox version, a Secret Bonus is awarded after every level when all the secret areas for that level have been found. It also has several new equipable items and weapons as well as new enemies. The two-player co-op mode is exclusive to Xbox and allows the second player to play as Agent One, altering the game in which he was never killed and played out the missions to the end. This allows for the story to support that Agent One either survived. The Xbox version also has downloadable content, system-link play and had online multiplayer via Xbox Live before Xbox Live was terminated for original Xbox games. Return to Castle Wolfenstein is now playable online on Insignia, a revival server restoring online functionality to Xbox games. A Platinum Hits edition of the game was also released for the Xbox. The PlayStation 2 version does not support online multiplayer.

The source code for Return to Castle Wolfenstein and Enemy Territory was released under the GNU General Public License v3.0 or later on August 12, 2010. The ioquake3 developers at icculus.org announced the start of respective engine projects soon after.

For its initial German release, Return to Castle Wolfenstein was modified as to comply with the country's rating board, Unterhaltungssoftware Selbstkontrolle (USK) and the national law Strafgesetzbuch section 86a that disallowed the use of Nazi symbols in the game as part of hate speech, with named and symbols changes, such as the Third Reich named as the "Wolf Clan". By 2018, the USK modified how it evaluated the use of hate speech symbols, accounting for artistic expression, and in 2026, Zenimax announced it would be releasing the original unmodified version of Return in Germany.

=== Community mods ===
==== RealRTCW ====
On October 15, 2020, a community overhaul mod RealRTCW was released on Steam as a free modification for the original game. It features a new renderer, expanded arsenal, rebalanced gunplay, new high-quality models, textures and sounds.

Ahead of the game's twenty-fifth anniversary, a celebratory PC port of Threewave Software's console-exclusive prologue, Cursed Sands, again developed by French creator William Faure, was announced on March 21, 2026, with a release on May 6 (the same date as the Xbox version's, Tides of War, in 2003) of the same year as a modification for the original game, and as a free DLC for the remastered RealRTCW on Steam and GOG, published by Dark Matter Productions.

==== Wolfenstein: Enemy Territory Single-Player & Cooperative ====
On November 19, 2021, day of the game's twentieth anniversary, free modification Wolfenstein: Enemy Territory Single-Player & Cooperative was released on Steam by French modder William Faure, head of a small team of developers at Dark Matter Productions since 2013 who was also involved in the development of RealRTCW, restoring the single-player campaign of the cancelled Return to Castle Wolfenstein: Enemy Territory expansion with approval and external support from original game developers.

== Film ==
A Return to Castle Wolfenstein film was announced in 2002 with Rob Cohen attached to direct. Little information has been available since, however, with the exception of a July 20, 2005, IGN interview. The interview discussed the Return to Castle Wolfenstein film with id employees. In the interview, Todd Hollenshead indicated that the movie was in the works, though still in the early stages.

On August 3, 2007, Variety confirmed Return to Castle Wolfenstein, to be written and directed by Roger Avary and produced by Samuel Hadida. On November 2, 2012, Roger Avary signed on to write and direct the film. The film is being described as a mix of Inglourious Basterds and Captain America.

== Reception ==
Reception

Aggregate score
Aggregator	Score		
Aggregator	PC	PS2	Xbox
Metacritic	88%	66%	84%

Review scores
Publication	Score		
Publication	PC	PS2	Xbox
AllGame	4/5	3.5/5	4/5
Computer Gaming World	3.5/5		
Edge	6/10		
Electronic Gaming Monthly		6.6/10	
Eurogamer	8/10	8/10	8/10
Game Informer		7.5/10	9.25/10
GamePro	4.5/5	3/5	4/5
GameSpot	9.2/10		8.2/10
IGN	9/10	7.6/10	9.2/10
PC PowerPlay	89%		

According to review aggregator website Metacritic, Return to Castle Wolfenstein received "generally favorable" reviews. Several critics remarked that the game was a capable successor to Wolfenstein 3D. and on par with its contemporaries. However, despite high pre-release expectations that the game would be as impactful as its predecessor, others felt the game was not innovative and derivative of other titles, such as Half-Life or The Operative: No One Lives Forever. Edge stated that despite a "lack of anything revelatory", the game embodied the shooter genre at its purest. Similarly, GameSpot described the game as a "pure shooter" whose appeal was in its action gameplay, but noted whilst it was "thoroughly competent and technically excellent", it was "also rather sterile and passionless", comparing the game as falling short of shooters including Serious Sam, Max Payne, or Alien vs. Predator 2.

Many critics praised the game's graphics and implementation of the Quake III engine, particularly the representation of the game's setting and environment. Eliot Fish of Hyper praised the authenticity of the game's "creepy atmosphere, nice environmental detail and excellent architecture". Li C. Kuo of PC Gamer similarly praised the game's "high-res textures, smooth animations and detailed character models", drawing attention to character animations, lighting effects and fire animations.

Critics generally praised the gameplay and single-player-missions, with particular praise directed towards the variety of environments, open-ended levels and multiple objectives. Some enjoyed the variety and handling of weapons in the game, finding the game's distribution of ammo and health was balanced and challenging. Reception of the enemy AI was mixed, with Some finding enemy behaviour complex and challenging, and others finding it unrealistic and easy to defeat. Reviewers highlighted the game's stealth mechanics, with Richard Shoemaker of PC Zone finding they provided a "pause in the relentless action" and were integrated well with the game. Other reviewers enjoyed the additions of secret areas and hidden treasure in adding replayability to levels, although others found them contrived and added little to the gameplay. Jim McCauley of PC Format considered the game's initial progression to be "depressingly straightforward", but praised later missions as "varied and rewarding". However, other critics felt some levels were too linear or uninteractive.

The game's multiplayer mode was considered by many to be a highlight, with some claiming the game featured one of the best multiplayer modes of a first-person shooter. Praise was directed towards the game's objective-based modes and classes. Eliot Fish of Hyper praised the mode's "fantastic map design" and "truly gripping teamplay". Air Hendrix of Australian PC World described the game's action as "more cerebral" and emphasising "teamwork and accomplishing specific objectives over twitchy combat".

The game's narrative received a less positive reception. Although some reviewers enjoyed the game's premise, many reviewers considered the game's themes and settings to be cliché. The game's cutscenes and dialogue also received a mixed reception. Christopher Allen of Allgame considered they added "intrigue" and "urgency" to the game, but James Cottee of PC PowerPlay described them as "surprisingly dry, dull and uninspiring". Richard Shoemaker of PC Zone expressed that the game had a "clever storyline" but lacked "classic moments", was "paced quite poorly" and did not have many surprises or twists.

The PlayStation 2 version, Operation Resurrection, received less favorable reviews, with critics considering the game to be an inferior version to its counterparts. Critics lamented the omission of multiplayer features, with Electronic Gaming Monthly stating the lack of any features was an "inexcusably raw deal" given the pedigree of the game's online gameplay on other platforms. Many reviews also noted the reduced graphical fidelity compared to other versions, and encountered poor performance, including a low framerate. Reviewers also commented on the difficulty of aiming with analog controls. Adam Pavlacka of Official Playstation 2 Magazine described the version as "Wolfenstein lite" and "half a game".

=== Sales ===
Return to Castle Wolfenstein debuted at #3 on NPD Intelect's computer game sales chart for the November 18–24 period, at an average retail price of $57. It fell to position 7 in its second week. By the end of 2001, the game's domestic sales totaled 253,852 units, for revenues of $13.1 million (~$22.1 million in 2024).

In the United States, Return to Castle Wolfenstein sold 350,000 copies and earned $17 million (~$25.4 million in 2024) by August 2006. It was the country's 48th-best-selling computer game between January 2000 and August 2006. Combined sales of all Wolfenstein computer games released between January 2000 and August 2006 had reached 660,000 units in the United States by the latter date. Return to Castle Wolfenstein received a "Silver" sales award from the Entertainment and Leisure Software Publishers Association (ELSPA), indicating sales of at least 100,000 copies in the United Kingdom. By January 2002, Activision reported that shipments of Return to Castle Wolfenstein to retailers had surpassed one million units. The game sold 2 million copies by January 2004.

=== Awards ===
PC Gamer US awarded Return to Castle Wolfenstein its 2001 "Best Multiplayer Game" prize. The editors wrote: "No other FPS rewards this level of teamplay, sports this kind of graphics, or is this blissfully free of cheaters."

Year	Award	Category	Result	Ref.
2001	Game Developers Choice Awards 2001	Excellence in Programming	Nominated	
2002	5th Annual Interactive Achievement Awards	Online Gameplay	Won	
2002	5th Annual Interactive Achievement Awards	PC Action/Adventure	Won	
2002	5th Annual Interactive Achievement Awards	Computer Game of the Year	Nominated	
2002	5th Annual Interactive Achievement Awards	Visual Engineering	Nominated	
2002	The Eighth Annual PC Gamer Awards	Best Multiplayer Game	Won	

== Sequels ==
A multiplayer-only spinoff of the series, Wolfenstein: Enemy Territory, was originally planned as a full-fledged expansion pack for Return to Castle Wolfenstein developed by Splash Damage. The single-player component of the game was never completed and thus was removed entirely. The developers at that point decided the multiplayer part would be released as a free, downloadable standalone game. Enemy Territory is a team-based networked multiplayer game which involves completing objectives through teamwork using various character classes.

This gameplay was later reutilized in a full-fledged commercial game Enemy Territory: Quake Wars set in id Software's Quake universe. A semi-sequel called Wolfenstein was developed by Raven Software and id Software and published by Activision, and released on August 18, 2009. A successor to Wolfenstein titled Wolfenstein: The New Order and a standalone prequel expansion titled Wolfenstein: The Old Blood have also been released in 2014 and 2015. The Old Blood references RTCW with characters with similar names and the X-labs being mentioned.

The New Order storyline was followed up in Wolfenstein II: The New Colossus which was released in late 2017.

== Sources ==
- Return to Castle Wolfenstein: Instruction Manual. Activision. 2001. pp. 1–49.
- "The History of Wolfenstein". Retro Gamer. No. 175. December 2017. pp. 80–87.
