= Wolfenstein (2009 video game) =

2009 video game

- Developers: Raven Software Additional work by: Pi Studios (multiplayer); Endrant Studios (additional multiplayer)
- Publisher: Activision
- Director: Eric C. Biessman
- Producer: Kevin Cloud
- Composer: Bill Brown
- Series: Wolfenstein
- Engine: id Tech 4
- Platforms: Microsoft Windows; PlayStation 3; Xbox 360
- Release: NA: August 18, 2009; AU: August 19, 2009; EU: August 21, 2009
- Genre: First-person shooter
- Modes: Single-player, multiplayer

Wolfenstein is a 2009 first-person shooter game developed by Raven Software and published by Activision, part of the Wolfenstein video game series. It serves as a loose sequel to the 2001 entry Return to Castle Wolfenstein, and uses an enhanced version of id Software's id Tech 4. The game was released in August 2009 for Microsoft Windows, PlayStation 3 and Xbox 360.

Wolfenstein received positive reception by critics, yet suffered from poor commercial sales; selling a combined 100,000 copies within its first month. It would be the final game id Software oversaw as an independent developer, released two months after their acquisition by ZeniMax Media in June 2009 and the final game in the series to be published by Activision. The game would be loosely succeeded by Wolfenstein: The New Order, released in 2014.

== Plot ==
Special agent William "B.J." Blazkowicz is held at gunpoint while stealing a medallion from a Nazi general on the German battleship Tirpitz. He unwittingly unleashes its powers, which kill the surrounding soldiers. He escapes to the Office of Secret Actions (OSA)—a joint American and British government agency—who send him directly to the town of Isendstadt. Led by Obergruppenführer Viktor Zetta, the Nazis excavate Isenstadt for "Nachtsonne" crystals, which power the medallion. On the way, Blazkowicz's cover is immediately blown by an unknown informant. Afterward, he meets with the Kreisau Circle, a German resistance group that helps him make it to Isenstadt.

After arriving, Blazkowicz meets brothers Stefon and Anton Kriege, who lead the Black Market. After, Blazkowicz meets Caroline Becker, the leader of the Kreisau Circle, and Erik Engle, her lieutenant. Becker sends Blazkowicz to a dig site, where he frees Sergei Kovlov and finds an exact copy of the general's medallion, which Kovlov calls the Thule Medallion. Kovlov introduces Blazkowicz to the Golden Dawn, a group of occult scholars founded and led by Dr. Leonid Alexandrov. Kovlov teaches Blazkowicz at the dig site how to use the medallion and provides a crystal that allows him to enter the Veil, a barrier between Earth and a dimension known as the Black Sun. Blazkowicz discovers that the Nazis are attempting to harness the power of the Black Sun dimension to turn the tide of war against the Allies. Eventually, Blazkowicz confronts and kills General Zetta, who is revealed to be a monster when viewed through the Veil. Afterward, the Golden Dawn, Black Market, and Kreisau Circle leave Isendstadt to avoid retaliation for Zetta's death.

Shortly after the move, Caroline Becker is captured and held in a nearby castle, and Blazkowicz helps the Kreisau Circle stage a rescue mission. He confronts Zetta's replacement, Obergruppenführer Wilhelm "Deathshead" Strasse, who is eager for revenge after Blazkowicz destroyed his Übersoldat-program. (Note: As depicted in Return to Castle Wolfenstein) Caroline appears to be killed by Hans Grosse, Deathshead's henchman. Upon Blazkowicz's return to Isenstadt, Stefan Kriege informs him that he has killed his brother, Anton, thinking he was the mole and betrayed both Blazkowicz and Caroline. Blazkowicz then discovers that a Nazi superweapon, powered by Black Sun energy, is about to be fired at Isendtadt from an overhead zeppelin. He boards the ship and discovers that Dr. Alexandrov was the real traitor, but Grosse executes Alexandrov.

Deathshead and Grosse enter the Black Sun dimension and are followed by Blazkowicz, where he encounters Hans Grosse guarding the machine that powers Deathshead's superweapon. Grosse, who is outfitted in a battlesuit and an identical Thule Medallion, is defeated by Blazkowicz. He then destroys the machine, but Deathshead flees through the portal before he can be captured. The ensuing explosion destroys the portal and destabilizes the zeppelin, effectively destroying all access points to the Black Sun dimension. Blazkowicz escapes via parachute and watches as the zeppelin destroys the castle.

In a post-credits cutscene, a wounded Deathshead is seen clambering out of the burning zeppelin and castle debris, screaming in frustration.

== Development ==
Wolfenstein uses an improved version of id Software's id Tech 4 game engine, the technology behind Doom 3 and Enemy Territory: Quake Wars. The game was developed by Raven Software for Windows, PlayStation 3 and Xbox 360. The modifications to the game engine include depth of field effects, soft shadowing, post-processing effects, Havok physics, as well as the addition of a supernatural realm, called the Veil. While in the Veil, the player has access to certain special abilities, such as the power to slow down time, to get around obstacles that exist on Earth, or even to be able to defeat enemies that have an otherwise impenetrable shield (similar to "Spirit Walk" from the previous id Tech 4 title Prey). The actress Carrie Coon started her career by doing motion capture work for Wolfenstein. The multiplayer part was developed by Endrant Studios. Wolfenstein is the first in a string of id Software games not planned to have a Linux port (continued on throughout Rage onwards), with the person in charge of Linux ports at id, Timothee Besset, commenting that "It is unlikely the new Wolfenstein title is going to get a native Linux release. None of it was done in house, and I had no involvement in the project."

On the day of Wolfenstein's release, a PC patch was released to address several issues with the online multiplayer component. The multiplayer development studio, Endrant Studios, soon laid off some of its workforce after the completion of the development of Wolfenstein's multiplayer.

Wolfenstein also marked the final game in the series to be published by Activision, released two months after developer id Software's acquisition by ZeniMax Media in June 2009, with later games in the series being published by Bethesda Softworks, starting with Wolfenstein: The New Order.

=== Motion comics ===
Four promotional motion comics, each about three minutes long, were released. Each is based on a particular installment in the Wolfenstein series and served as a nostalgic reminder. The first one recreates Wolfenstein 3D's escape from Castle Wolfenstein, the Hans Grosse killing and the final battle against Adolf Hitler. The second is based upon Wolfenstein 3D's prequel game Spear of Destiny, and recreates its final battle, in which B.J. fights the cybernetic Death Knight and the Angel of Death for control of the Spear. The third comic is based on Return to Castle Wolfenstein and recreates the battle with Olaric, the destruction of an experimental V2 rocket and later the final battle against Heinrich I. The fourth comic is based on the Wolfenstein's own cinematic introduction and shows B.J. infiltrating a Nazi battleship and stealing the first Thule medallion.

== Reception ==
Reception

Aggregate score
Aggregator	Score		
Aggregator	PC	PS3	Xbox 360
Metacritic	74/100	71/100	72/100

Review scores
Publication	Score		
Publication	PC	PS3	Xbox 360
Destructoid	N/A	N/A	(Jim) 7/10 (Brad) 6.5/10
Eurogamer	N/A	6/10	6/10
Game Informer	7.25/10	7.25/10	7.25/10
GamePro	N/A	4/5	4/5
GameRevolution	N/A	B−	B−
GameSpot	7.5/10	7.5/10	7.5/10
GameSpy	4/5	4/5	4/5
GameTrailers	N/A	6.8/10	N/A
GameZone	7.5/10	8.5/10	8.5/10
Giant Bomb	N/A	4/5	4/5
IGN	7.3/10	7/10	7.3/10
Official Xbox Magazine (US)	N/A	N/A	7.5/10
PC Gamer (UK)	84%	N/A	N/A
PlayStation: The Official Magazine	N/A	4/5	N/A
The A.V. Club	N/A	C+	N/A
The Daily Telegraph	N/A	7/10	N/A

The game received "average" reviews on all platforms according to the review aggregation website Metacritic. IGN gave the game a positive review, though Jason Ocampo said of it, "...you can't help but wish that they developed the kernel of ideas in this game into something more. As it is, this new Wolfenstein comes off as an engaging, if otherwise forgettable, shooter."

411Mania gave the Xbox 360 version eight out of ten and said that it "holds up this tradition of mindless fun, although it doesn't do anything revolutionary." The Daily Telegraph gave the PlayStation 3 version 7/10 and called it "a game that swings wildly in quality on an almost minute-by-minute basis, and a rather vanilla multiplayer offering doesn't do much to quicken the pulse." However, The A.V. Club gave the same console version a C+ and said that the multiplayer "feels jerky and unbalanced." Edge gave the same console version 5/10 and said, "For all its foibles, Raven's brand of brazen, aimless carnage is a gruesome thrill with just enough dynamism in each battle to keep its anachronistic heart beating." Ben "Yahtzee" Croshaw of Zero Punctuation found the game so dull that he resorted to writing his review in limerick form. Years later, he held the game in a much kinder light when compared to more contemporary shooters such as Call of Duty.

As a result of low sales figures (only 100,000 copies were sold in its first month), Activision laid off employees from Raven Software. The game was removed from digital storefronts in 2014 due to rights issues between Bethesda and Activision. As such, the game is no longer available to purchase digitally.
