= Wolfenstein: Cyberpilot =

- Developers: Arkane Lyon; MachineGames
- Publisher: Bethesda Softworks
- Series: Wolfenstein
- Engine: id Tech 6
- Platforms: Microsoft Windows; PlayStation 4
- Release: July 26, 2019
- Genre: First-person shooter
- Mode: Single-player

Wolfenstein: Cyberpilot is a 2019 first-person shooter game developed by Arkane Lyon in conjunction with MachineGames, and published by Bethesda Softworks. A spin-off in the Wolfenstein series, Cyberpilot is a virtual reality experience. The game was released for PlayStation 4 and Windows on July 26, 2019. It received mixed reviews from critics.

== Gameplay ==
Unlike previous entries, Cyberpilot is a virtual reality experience. Cyberpilot is a side story that takes place chronologically a week prior to the events of Wolfenstein: Youngblood. Set twenty years after the events of The New Colossus, the protagonist is depicted as a computer hacker known as Cyberpilot who works for the French Resistance against the Nazi regime. Through hacking, the player character takes over hostile armored war machines and uses them against Nazi soldiers. The game features four levels and three pilotable machines, including the Panzerhund, the Zitadelle, and a small drone for a stealth mission. During combat, players can occasionally deploy a shield to defend themselves. In between missions, players can explore a Resistance bunker.

== Development ==
Cyberpilot was primarily developed by Arkane Studios in Lyon, with franchise developer MachineGames providing additional development. Arkane Lyon envisioned the game as a "different" kind of Wolfenstein game, and therefore, did not try to emulate the gameplay of the main games in the series. The game was announced by publisher Bethesda Softworks during its press conference during E3 2018. It was released on July 26, 2019 for Windows PC and PlayStation 4.

Both Cyberpilot and Youngblood were the first in the franchise to make use of the "social adequacy clause" introduced by Unterhaltungssoftware Selbstkontrolle (USK; the German software ratings board) in August 2018, which allowed the use of Nazi imagery and symbols in video games in relevant scenarios, reviewed on a case-by-case basis. Despite being officially rated by USK, major German retailers, such as MediaMarkt, Saturn, and GameStop, refused to sell the uncensored version, offering only the separately sold German version, which lacks all Nazi imagery and references and features German as the only language option.

== Reception ==
Wolfenstein: Cyberpilot received "mixed or average" reviews from critics, according to review aggregator website Metacritic.

The game's visuals and presentation received some praise. Many critics criticized the combat for its simplicity and clunkiness, and remarked that firearms in the game lacked a sense of impact. Critics were also disappointed by the game's thin narrative, feeling that they did not reach the standard set by previous Wolfenstein games. Its short length and lack of replayability was also criticized.
