= Wolfenstein II: The New Colossus =

2017 video game

- Developer: MachineGames
- Publisher: Bethesda Softworks
- Director: Jens Matthies
- Producer: John Jennings
- Designers: Andreas Öjerfors; Arcade Berg; Aydin Afzoud
- Programmer: Jim Kjellin
- Artist: Axel Torvenius
- Writers: Jens Matthies; Tommy Tordsson Björk
- Composers: Mick Gordon; Martin Stig Andersen
- Series: Wolfenstein
- Engine: id Tech 6
- Platforms: PlayStation 4; Windows; Xbox One; Nintendo Switch
- Release: PC, PS4, Xbox One; 27 October 2017; Nintendo Switch; 29 June 2018
- Genre: First-person shooter
- Mode: Single-player

Wolfenstein II: The New Colossus is a 2017 first-person shooter game developed by MachineGames and published by Bethesda Softworks. The seventh main entry in the Wolfenstein series and the sequel to 2014's Wolfenstein: The New Order, the game is set in an alternate history that takes place in 1961, following the Nazi victory in the Second World War. The story follows war veteran William "B.J." Blazkowicz and his efforts to fight against the Nazi regime in the United States. Gameplay mechanics are largely similar to those of The New Order, though the team introduced improvements such as allowing players to dual-wield any combination of weapons in the game. A binary choice in the prologue alters the game's entire storyline; some characters and small plot points are replaced throughout the timelines.

The New Colossus was developed using the id Tech 6 game engine; the technology and animations required a complete overhaul from The New Order, which used id Tech 5. The goal for the team was to retain the feel of combat in The New Order and further refine and polish it, as well as introduce more freedom of movement for players. As the game is set in a Nazi-occupied America, the team was intrigued by the juxtaposition of America, which was "founded on the idea of freedom", being under totalitarian control, and wanted to explore how Germany would have attempted to subvert American culture. Continuing from The New Order, the development team aimed to characterize Blazkowicz for players to adopt his personality. Mick Gordon returned as the game's composer and is joined by Martin Stig Andersen. Both Brian Bloom and Nina Franoszek returned to provide voice and motion capture for Blazkowicz and Frau Engel, the game's primary antagonist.

It was released in October 2017 for PlayStation 4, Windows, and Xbox One. The Nintendo Switch version, developed by Panic Button, was released in June 2018. Its marketing campaign attracted controversy for leaning into real-life events. Wolfenstein II: The New Colossus was released to a positive critical response. Particular praise was directed at the characters, narrative, cast performance, and gunplay, as well as the general presentation of the game, though its level design and gameplay received a mixed response from critics. The game was nominated for multiple year-end awards, winning "Best Action Game" at The Game Awards 2017. Following the game's launch, MachineGames released Freedom Chronicles, which is a collection of three downloadable content packs. A spin-off game, Wolfenstein: Youngblood, was released in 2019. A sequel, Wolfenstein III, is in development.

== Gameplay ==
In this gameplay screenshot, protagonist William "B.J." Blazkowicz is dual-wielding two weapons. The heads-up display shows B.J.'s health and armor.

Like its predecessor, Wolfenstein II: The New Colossus is a first-person shooter. Once again, the player assumes control of the series protagonist, William "B.J." Blazkowicz, who must venture into a Nazi-occupied America to ignite a revolution against the Nazi regime. Blazkowicz has a large arsenal of gadgets and weapons, such as shotguns, submachine guns, pistols, and assault rifles, as well as grenades to fight against his enemies. Players can freely mix weapons for dual-wielding, giving them an advantage over enemies by dealing twice as much damage. As in the previous game, at the beginning of The New Colossus, the player chooses between two timelines involving which of two characters (Fergus and Wyatt) will appear, resulting in alterations to the game's story and cutscenes. Choosing Fergus allows players to access the "LaserKraftWerk", an energy weapon that can be used to disintegrate enemies and obstacles while choosing Wyatt grants players the "DieselKraftWerk", which acts similarly to a grenade launcher. These weapons run on fuel or electricity, which can be refilled in dispensers found throughout a level. Also running on fuel and electricity are heavy weapons, which are typically looted from fallen soldiers. These weapons, while being immensely powerful, slow down the player's movement and attract hostile attention.

Both stealth and confrontation are viable combat tactics in the game. Players can lean around, over, and under cover, which can be used as a tactical advantage during shootouts and stealth levels. Blazkowicz is equipped with a hatchet that allows him to perform melee attacks. He can use it to silently take down enemies without being detected or execute an enemy up close during combat. The hatchet can also be thrown at distant enemies. Some areas in the game are patrolled by Nazi commanders, who may call in reinforcements if Blazkowicz's presence is detected. Midway through the game, players can also choose from one of three "contraptions". The "Constrictor Harness" compresses Blazkowicz's torso and allows him to squeeze into narrow areas; the "Ram Shackles" allow Blazkowicz to break down doors and obstacles, and tackle enemies when he sprints; and the "Battle Walkers", which are a pair of stilts, allow him to reach high areas that are otherwise inaccessible. The game utilizes a health system in which players' health is divided into separate sections that regenerate; if an entire section is lost, players must use a health pack to replenish the missing health. Blazkowicz can consume more health packs than is necessary, entering an "overcharged" state, though his health will eventually drop to that of his maximum health. Players can also collect armor by defeating armored enemies or collecting helmets and vests scattered in a level. Armor will not regenerate and functions as a shield that reduces the amount of damage received. Depending on the player's playstyle, they will earn Perks that are divided into three categories: Stealth, Mayhem, and Tactical, once they have completed certain objectives and challenges, granting them further combat advantages.

A German U-boat named Eva’s Hammer serves as the game's hub area, where players can talk to other non-playable characters and complete side missions. A fully playable version of Wolfenstein 3D can also be found inside the submarine. Through exploring each level, players may collect weapon upgrade kits, allowing them to modify and upgrade their weapons to suit their playstyle. For instance, a pistol can be customized with a suppressor, letting players eliminate enemies from afar without drawing any hostile attention. Players will also find various collectibles, such as star cards, gold, and concept art, scattered throughout a level. Defeated enemy commanders drop enigma codes, which can be decoded by accessing an enigma machine at Eva's Hammer. Once decoded, the location of a high-ranking Nazi official (named Uberkommandant) will be revealed, and players will be tasked with revisiting previously explored levels to assassinate them. There are a total of 16 assassination missions players can complete. The game features six difficulty levels. After the player completes the main campaign, an extra hard level will be unlocked.

== Plot ==
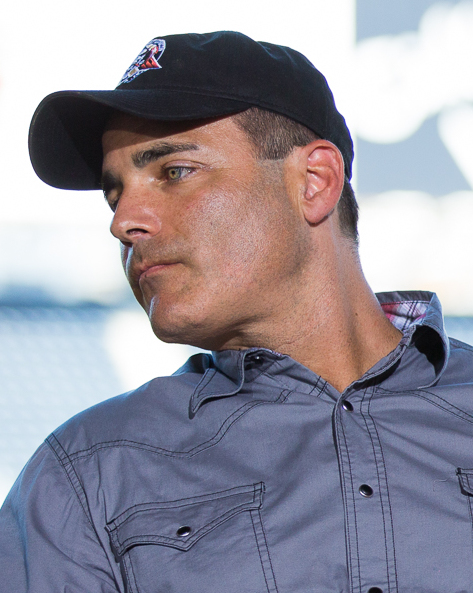
Brian Bloom reprised his role as William Blazkowicz in the game.

Immediately after the events of Wolfenstein: The New Order, the Kreisau Circle retrieves a critically-injured Blazkowicz from Deathshead's fortress before destroying it with a nuclear cannon. With Deathshead's demise and the compound's destruction, the Nazi research division is crippled, stagnating their technological advancement. Blazkowicz falls into a five-month-long coma. As he fades in and out of consciousness aboard the captured U-boat Eva's Hammer, it is revealed that Anya, Blazkowicz's love interest, is pregnant with twins. The U-boat is attacked by SS-Obergruppenführer Irene Engel, a sadistic Nazi commander who captures Caroline. Blazkowicz devises a plan to get himself captured and taken to Engel's airship, the Ausmerzer, which is suspending the U-boat above water. Engel's daughter Sigrun refuses to decapitate Caroline, so Engel kills Caroline instead. Sigrun, disgusted by her mother's abuse, tackles Engel, allowing Blazkowicz to don Caroline's armor and break free. Blazkowicz disconnects Eva's Hammer from the Ausmerzer and flees back to the U-boat with Sigrun and Caroline's body.

After Caroline's funeral, the group decides to carry out what would have been the next step in her plan to end the Nazi regime: liberate the United States and use it as a central base from which to free the rest of the world. The group sets out to contact a resistance cell hiding in the Empire State Building amid the ruins of Manhattan, which was destroyed by a Nazi atomic bomb. Blazkowicz finds and recruits Grace Walker, a passionate, scarred African-American Black Power activist (Debra Wilson), and Norman "Super Spesh" Caldwell (Don McManus), a lawyer-turned-conspiracy theorist. Grace informs the Circle of her plan to cripple Nazi leadership in the U.S. by destroying the Oberkommando in Roswell, New Mexico, near the site of an unearthed Da'at Yichud cache. Blazkowicz travels to Roswell with a portable nuclear warhead before heading to Super Spesh's hideout. Spesh takes him to his bunker and to a tunnel that leads to the Oberkommando, where Blazkowicz deposits the bomb in the base's reactor and detonates it after escaping Roswell.

Afterward, Blazkowicz takes a detour to Mesquite, Texas, his hometown, to recover an heirloom ring, where he confronts his abusive and racist father Rip (Glenn Morshower). Now a Nazi collaborator, Rip reveals he, with the help of other like-minded neighbors, allowed Blazkowicz's Jewish mother Zofia, along with all the other Jewish, non-white, and homosexual neighbors, to be taken by the Nazis, and that he intends to hand him over as well. Blazkowicz kills Rip but is captured by Engel, who steals the ring. Super Spesh visits Blazkowicz acting as his lawyer, and they plan an escape, but Engel appears and kills Spesh, having known his ruse. Blazkowicz is sentenced to death in a kangaroo court and beheaded on international television at the Lincoln Memorial in Washington, D.C.

The Kreisau Circle recovers Blazkowicz's head using a drone and surgically grafts it onto a bioengineered Nazi super-soldier body. A revived Blazkowicz breaks into a Nazi bunker under New York to steal a file on New Orleans, which has been converted into a massive ghetto, and travels there to rally freedom fighters under the command of communist fighter Horton Boone (Christopher Heyerdahl). After a brief ideological clash, Horton allies with Blazkowicz, and the resistance fights through Nazi death squads to escape in the Eva's Hammer. To capture the Ausmerzer to prevent its use against the Kreisau Circle's planned revolution, they plan to deactivate its automated defense system by stealing its deactivation codes from a Nazi facility on Venus. Blazkowicz assumes the identity of an actor and is invited to Venus to audition for a propaganda film about himself produced by Adolf Hitler (Norbert Weisser). Blazkowicz retrieves the codes and returns to Earth to decipher them.

The Kreisau Circle mounts an assault on the Ausmerzer, where the resistance members disable the defense and hijack its command systems. Learning Engel is on national television in Hollywood, Los Angeles, the resistance travels there and assaults the studio complex. Blazkowicz kills Engel, and the Kreisau Circle proclaims the start of a revolution to liberate America. To ensure the total collapse of the Nazis' chain of command in the U.S., Grace orders Blazkowicz to kill all Ubercommanders who served as Engel's lieutenants.

The revolution, depicted pictorially during the credits sequence, breaks out across the country and ultimately succeeds. In a post-credits scene, Blazkowicz takes back his heirloom ring from Engel's body and proposes to Anya.

== Development ==
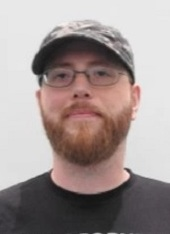
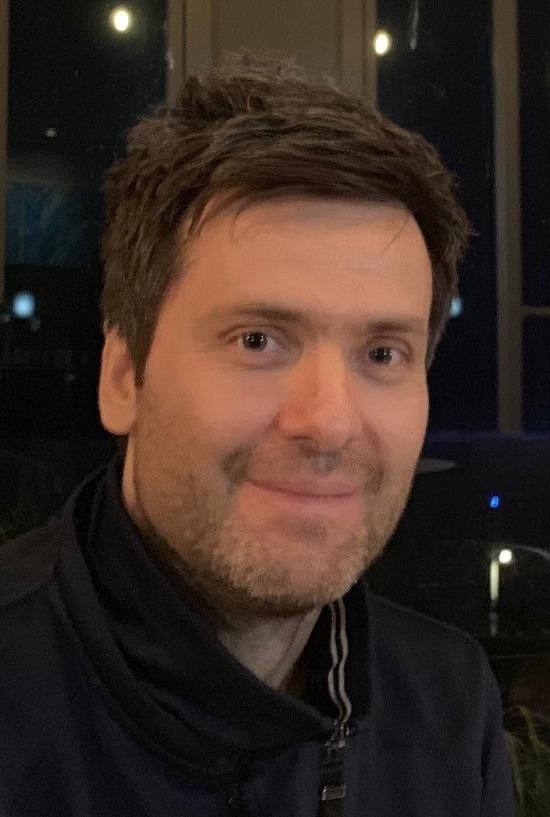
Creative director and co-writer Jens Matthies (left) and executive producer Jerk Gustafsson

MachineGames, the developer of Wolfenstein: The New Order, returned to develop the game, and id Software assisted the game's development. While Wolfenstein II was MachineGames' second major project, several members of the team previously worked at Starbreeze Studios on games such as The Chronicles of Riddick: Escape from Butcher Bay and The Darkness. Jens Matthies served as the game's director and co-wrote the story with Tommy Tordsson Björk. Mick Gordon and Martin Stig Andersen served as the game's composers. Gordon mostly composed the soundtracks for the Resistance side of the game, while Andersen contributed to the Nazi side. The game was developed using id Tech 6; the technology and animations required a complete overhaul from The New Order, which used id Tech 5. The Nintendo Switch version of the game was ported by Panic Button.

=== Gameplay ===
According to the team, they wanted gunplay to be "very heavy, very physical, and anchored in the physical world". To avoid making gunplay "cumbersome", the team created numerous weapon animations to demonstrate the weight of these weapons instead of slowing down the player's movement. The ability for players to dual-wield weapons meant that the team needed to create an extensive amount of animation to accommodate all possible combinations. While the game does not feature full environmental destruction, cover may be destroyed. To ensure that this system was fully utilized, the artificial intelligence controlling the enemies were programmed to hide behind destructible covers. The team built a full-body model of Blazkowicz, which can be seen from a first-person perspective. This allowed the team to create a more "physical" game with more tangible interactions with the environment. For instance, a nearby explosive will push Blazkowicz to the ground. The team initially wanted to add tomahawks to the game, though the game being set in the 1960s meant that an axe would be more period-accurate. As an axe is heavier than a throwing knife (the melee weapon in The New Order), the team initially experimented with forcing players to aim higher to hit distant objects, though this idea was scrapped as they thought it was not enjoyable from a gameplay perspective.

For gameplay, the team wanted to further refine The New Order's combat, and increased the player's freedom of movement. While the game was often marketed as a "cathartic shooting game", it was designed to be difficult to encourage players to use creative ways to approach a problem. When players had difficulties completing an area, they were required to re-examine their strategies. The team also wanted to expand options for stealth, though the time spent on developing it was significantly less when comparing with gunplay and that not enough team members were fully confident in implementing stealth in a Wolfenstein game. The Laserhund was singled out as one of the more poorly-received enemies in the game, partly because it was added fairly late during the game's development. Following the poor reception of the London Monitor boss battle in New Order, the team decided to avoid including boss fights against gigantic enemies.

=== Story ===
When creating Wolfenstein II, the team was inspired by the development of Wolfenstein 3D, whose development team had "totally unrestricted creative freedom". As a result, the team retained moments that were "obnoxiously grandiose and crazy" while ensuring that they were respectful. As with The New Order, The New Colossus is set in an alternate history, giving MachineGames more freedom in creating the game's narrative and introducing science fiction elements when creating the game's world and enemies. Like The New Order, The New Colossus has a level set in outer space. This was because the team wanted to introduce additional gameplay variety and evoke a sense of adventure. Venus was chosen because it was not a common setting for both films and video games. The location was first teased in The New Order. Commenting on the game's nature, Matthies added that the team considered Wolfenstein II to be "much more like a The Last of Us or an Uncharted within a first person context" than a "straight up shooter". The team did not consider adding multiplayer to the game as they felt that it may "dilute" its storytelling.

The game is set in a Nazi-occupied America, where Nazi flags are displayed prominently in cities such as Roswell and members of the Ku Klux Klan roam the city's streets. Americana imagery and retrofuturism inspired the game's overall aesthetics.

The story was described to be both "character driven" and "location driven", as the entire development team can propose ideas on possible level locations while the story team created the narrative that occurs in the chosen space. America was chosen as its setting because it was Blazkowicz's homeland, making the story more personal. America did not appear as a level in The New Order, as the team felt a full sequel was needed to explore the setting in a meaningful way. Ultimately, the team chose locations that were "iconic" but not commonly explored in other mediums. Americana imagery and retrofuturism inspired the game's overall aesthetics. The team wanted to explore an America where Nazi Germany had subverted its culture and infiltrated its values into everyday American life. The team intended to show a possible spectrum of American responses towards Nazi rule. The Roswell level showed an American population that has adapted to Nazi rule, being "a reflection of ordinary society under Nazi oppression". In contrast, New Orleans was transformed into a ghetto used for imprisoning rebel fighters and dissidents. For the Texas level, the team recruited Kevin Cloud from id Software to help modify the level's script. MachineGames had a hard time casting Rip Blazkowicz, who was racist and abusive. Cinematic performance director Tom Keegan approached Glenn Morshower, whom he previously worked with on Battlefield 3, for the role. Morshower based his performance on his experience interacting with his grandfather.

While the game as a whole was designed to be over-the-top, the team juxtaposed it with the game's story and characters, which were "more intimate" and "normal". This approach to storytelling was inspired by films such as RoboCop, District 9, and Guardians of the Galaxy. The team continued to evolve Blazkowicz from a "1980s action hero" to a distinct character with his own unique personality and struggles. Early segments of the game see Blazkowicz in a crippled, broken state, and the opening scene, which involves Blazkowicz killing Nazi soldiers while controlling a wheelchair, was described by Matties as a "testament to B.J.'s willpower". Midway through the game, Blazkowicz was beheaded by Frau Engel. This was an idea Matthies had since working with Arkane Studios on Dishonored (2012). The scene served as a culmination to the first part of the game and demonstrates how tough he is, being able to "survive his own beheading". In The New Colossus, while Blazkowicz is proficient in killing Nazis, he is exhausted by the war. Writer Tommy Tordsson Björk compared Blazkowicz to John McClane from the Die Hard franchise, noting how he must endure treacherous scenarios to reunite with his family and friends. As with The New Order, his inner thoughts are featured prominently in the game. According to voice actor Brian Bloom, these inner voices are softer, more contemplative, and less secure when compared with his spoken dialogue, thus creating a "nice balance" against his tough demeanor.

For its depiction of Nazis, Matthies remarked that the team "never wanted to undermine or make light of what Nazi ideology is actually about". The team did not want to avoid controversy by sidestepping Nazi ideology or making them "cartoony". As a result, the game was "political" in nature, though it was not designed to be a "commentary on current topics". Frau Engel served as the game's primary antagonist, with Nina Franoszek returning to voice the character. Franoszek added that the character is desperate to cling to power and despises her daughter Sigrun, whom she deems was weak-minded. Matthies described Sigrun as a "complicated character" due to her troubled past. Despite growing up as a loyal Nazi follower, she resents her past. Adolf Hitler was featured in the Venus level. MachineGames wanted to use Wolfenstein II as a platform to introduce the character, but did not intend for him to be the main antagonist. In the scene, Hitler rehearsed with Blazkowicz, disguised as an actor, for a propaganda film. Matthies described him as being so "powerful" that he lost all kinds of social boundaries. At some point during development, Matthies suggested that Hitler's penis be visible during the scene. This idea ultimately didn't make it into the game after Bethesda's VP of Production Todd Vaughn advised against it. The scene was heavily censored for the game's release in Germany. His mustache was removed, and characters did not address Hitler as their Führer. All swastika symbols were replaced, and Hitler accused characters in the game of being spies instead of being Jews.

== Release ==
Following the game's reveal, commentators drew parallels between the game's premise and contemporary accounts of the rise of the alt-right in the United States, particularly after the events of the August 2017 Unite the Right rally in Charlottesville, Virginia, and the murder of counter-protester Heather Heyer. Bethesda's marketing head, Pete Hines, stated that the game was "not written to be a commentary on current events, because no one – at MachineGames or at Bethesda – could predict what would happen." Hines further stated that they otherwise made no changes to the game or planned to change the downloadable content for the game based on these events. Bethesda opted to use current attitudes towards Nazis based on these events in its marketing of the title. Hines stated: "We weren't going to hide from the fact our game is about killing Nazis and freeing the US from their rule, and if we can reference current events as part of talking about the game, so be it. Nazis are evil. We aren't afraid to remind people of that". The game adopted the phrase "Make America Nazi-Free Again", based on Donald Trump's slogan "Make America Great Again", as its primary advertising tagline. Other ads used the phrase "Not My America", a slogan used by groups protesting Trump's policies. Responding to the negative feedback towards people objecting this to anti-Trump, Hines said, "We don't feel it's a reach for us to say Nazis are bad and un-American, and we're not worried about being on the right side of history here." He also said "people who are against freeing the world from the hate and murder of a Nazi regime probably aren't interested in playing Wolfenstein. Later on, company executive said the game was not a "social critique on 2017 America," debunking those claims.

Wolfenstein II: The New Colossus was originally teased at Bethesda's press conference during E3 2016. The game was officially announced at the E3 2017 conference in June 2017. The game was released on 27 October 2017 for PlayStation 4, Windows, and Xbox One. To promote the game, Bethesda released a propaganda-filled cartoon featuring a superhero named "Blitzmensch" defeating various American villains and a game show in which the American contestants are quizzed on the German language. A 2018 release for the Nintendo Switch was announced during the September 2017 Nintendo Direct presentation. The Nintendo Switch version was released on 29 June 2018. The game's collector's edition includes a Blazkowicz action figure, a SteelBook, and a poster. A demo for the game was released on Steam in November 2023. Wolfenstein II was not available for purchase in Israel, though Bethesda did not specify the reason behind such a decision.

Three downloadable content packs, collectively titled Freedom Chronicles, were released by MachineGames and Escalation Studios. Each pack introduces a new protagonist who joins the resistance to fight against the Nazi regime in America. Bethesda added that the three DLC packs, alongside the prologue Episode 0, will offer 9 hours of new content to players. The three DLC packs generally received mixed reviews from critics, with critics criticizing their story, recycled environment, and map design.

Freedom Chronicles campaign
Name	Release date	Notes
The Adventures of Gunslinger Joe	14 December 2017	The story focuses on African American athlete Joseph Stallion, nicknamed "Gunslinger Joe", who is enslaved by the Nazis and forced to play in rigged American football matches against Aryan teams. As he escapes custody and flees to a resistance facility, he is captured by Dr. Roderick Metze, who had captured Joseph's father and is planning to utilize a weapon called the Sun Gun (Sonnengewehr) from Venus to destroy the Midwest and end the Resistance.
The Diaries of Agent Silent Death	30 January 2018	Agent Jessica Valiant, codenamed "Silent Death", was a British OSA agent who was married to the late fellow agent Jack Valiant, who was killed during the Nazi invasion. Broken, Jessica fled to Rio de Janeiro, where she lived in hiding until she received a mysterious letter instructing her to assassinate three high-ranking Nazi officials who were responsible for Jack's death.
The Deeds of Captain Wilkins	12 March 2018	Captain Jerry Wilkins, an American soldier who fought in World War II, is forced to flee America when the Nazis invade and drop an atomic bomb on New York City. For the next 20 years, he lives in hiding until he receives a mysterious message instructing him to travel to Kodiak Island, Alaska, to stop a Nazi project called the "Sun Gun".

== Reception ==
Reception

Aggregate score
Aggregator	Score
Metacritic	(PC) 86/100 (PS4) 87/100 (XONE) 88/100 (NS) 79/100

Review scores
Publication	Score
Game Informer	9.75/10
GameSpot	9/10
GamesRadar+	4.5/5
IGN	9.1/10
PC Gamer (US)	81/100
Polygon	9/10
Shacknews	9/10
USgamer	4.5/5

Wolfenstein II: The New Colossus was released to "generally favorable" reviews, according to review aggregator website Metacritic. The game debuted in 4th place in the UK and Australian sales charts, 5th in the New Zealand sales charts, and 14th in the U.S. sales charts, behind games such as Assassin's Creed Origins and Super Mario Odyssey, which were released on the same day as Wolfenstein II.

The gameplay received a generally positive reception. Eurogamer's Edwin Evans-Thirlwell commended the game's combat, describing it as "terrific", while Javy Gwaltney from Game Informer described it as "satisfying". Gwaltney felt that the upgrades and contraptions catered to the needs of a wide range of players. The perks system was well-liked by critics, as Blazkowicz became progressively stronger and more efficient in combat. Andy Hartup from GamesRadar added that The New Colossus had successfully captured "the spirit of old-school shooters perfectly", and liked how MachineGames introduced stealth and exploration to add variety to the gameplay formula. He, however, disliked the difficulty spikes that occurred in the game, adding that the game "[punished] players a little too severely in an attempt to up the ante from previous levels". Some critics noticed minor gameplay annoyances, such as issues with leaning and vaulting over cover, difficulty in identifying the location of attacking enemies, and unclear communications to players regarding how much damage they were taking from enemies. Several critics noted that stealth was often not a viable way to approach their objectives, as they were often detected by enemies. Liam Croft from Push Square described the gameplay as "bland, monotonous, and incredibly frustrating", noting that the gameplay annoyances contributed to an unenjoyable experience. Matt Gerardi from The A.V. Club remarked that the gameplay, which was "unforgiving", did not align well with the game's narrative, which positioned Blazkowicz as "an unstoppable killing machine".

The levels in the game received a mixed response. Sam Machkovech from Ars Technica strongly praised the first level for not conforming to the player's expectations. He remarked that while early sections of the game often funneled players down claustrophobic tunnels and sewers, levels eventually opened up, citing New Orleans and Venus as the best levels in the game. He particularly liked how the levels allowed players to freely choose how they wanted to approach an objective. Gwaltney noted that the game became progressively zany and "more ambitious", "constantly upping the ante" and making full use of various levels in the game. Some critics criticized the levels for being unimaginative. Samuel Roberts from PC Gamer liked the world-building in the game and described the Roswell level as the "most interesting snapshot of everyday life in Wolfenstein 2", though he was disappointed that it was the only level that explored this concept. While Horti still liked the variety of levels, he felt that they were less impressive than those from The New Order. Caty McCarthy from USgamer felt that the campaign became stale towards its end as the game stopped introducing new enemy types, despite remarking that the game had a lot of replay value due to the timeline differences and the introduction of the assassination missions, Hartup cited faults in how the game directed players towards their objectives, and wrote that repetitive level design discouraged players from revisiting them.

The story of the game received critical acclaim. Kallie Plagge from GameSpot wrote that the cutscenes in the game were beautifully directed and that most of the major characters had "their own story of oppression and marginalization". She remarked that despite the game's bombastic plot, the dynamics of the crew managed to keep players engaged and invested throughout. Horti felt that while the game explored various themes, it did not "dwell on those subjects long enough to have anything to say about them". Gwaltney liked how the team juxtaposed heavy themes with humor and contrasted violent scenes with "heartfelt moments of romance and friendship". Despite disliking the gameplay, Croft concluded that The New Colossus was a "better game to watch than play", praising its unforgettable story and worldbuilding. Hartup found the central story to be incohesive, adding that at times he felt like "playing a series of mood-pieces tied together by the central hero". The portrayal of women in the game, including Anya and Grace, received critical acclaim. The antagonist, Frau Engel, also received acclaim from critics. Hartup called her "unpredictable, vaguely deranged, and utterly insidious", while Dan Stapleton from IGN wrote that she "steals the show with her absolutely gleeful sadism". Sara Elsam from Eurogamer liked the game's exploration of trauma and abuse, concluding that Wolfenstein II "delivers a hero that's struggling", a feat that is nearly unprecedented in the medium. Bill Lavoy from Shacknews praised Wolfenstein II for showing the human side of Blazkowicz. He went on to describe the game as "one of the best written games this year", and praised the performance of the cast.

=== Awards and accolades ===
Entertainment Weekly, Eurogamer, GamesRadar+, Polygon, and Electronic Gaming Monthly listed The New Colossus as one of the best video games of 2017.

Year	Award	Category	Result	Ref.
2017	35th Annual Golden Joystick Awards	Best Gaming Performance (Brian Bloom)	Nominated	
2017	35th Annual Golden Joystick Awards	Studio of the Year (MachineGames)	Nominated	
2017	The Game Awards 2017	Best Action Game	Won	
2017	The Game Awards 2017	Best Game Direction	Nominated	
2017	The Game Awards 2017	Best Narrative	Nominated	
2017	The Game Awards 2017	Best Performance (Brian Bloom)	Nominated	
2017	Titanium Awards	Best Action Game	Won	
2017	Titanium Awards	Game of the Year	Nominated	
2017	Titanium Awards	Best Interpretation	Nominated	
2018	New York Game Awards 2018	Best Writing	Won	
2018	New York Game Awards 2018	Game of the Year	Nominated	
2018	New York Game Awards 2018	Best Music in a Game	Nominated	
2018	New York Game Awards 2018	Best Acting in a Game (Brian Bloom)	Nominated	
2018	18th Annual Game Developers Choice Awards	Best Narrative	Nominated	
2018	14th British Academy Games Awards	Best Narrative	Nominated	
2018	2018 Webby Awards	Action (Games)	Nominated	
2018	21st Annual D.I.C.E. Awards	Action Game of the Year	Nominated	
2018	21st Annual D.I.C.E. Awards	Outstanding Achievement in Original Music Composition	Nominated	
2018	21st Annual D.I.C.E. Awards	Outstanding Achievement in Story	Nominated	
2018	16th Annual Game Audio Network Guild Awards	Best Dialogue	Nominated	
2018	16th Annual Game Audio Network Guild Awards	Best Original Instrumental ("Lontano")	Nominated	
2018	Italian Video Game Awards	Game of the Year	Nominated	
2018	Italian Video Game Awards	Best Narrative	Nominated	
2018	Italian Video Game Awards	Best Character (BJ Blazkowicz)	Nominated	
2018	17th Annual National Academy of Video Game Trade Reviewers Awards	Game, Franchise Action	Won	

== Sequel ==
On 10 June 2018, Bethesda Softworks announced Wolfenstein: Youngblood, a co-op spin-off serving as a continuation of the series that was released on 26 July 2019, with the story taking place twenty years after the events of The New Colossus. In an interview with Noclip in 2025, Gustafsson said that the modern Wolfenstein games were envisioned as a trilogy, and expressed interest in developing a third game. Wolfenstein III formally entered production in November 2026.
