= Wolfenstein: The New Order =

2014 video game

- Developer: MachineGames
- Publisher: Bethesda Softworks
- Directors: Jerk Gustafsson; Jens Matthies
- Producer: Lars Johansson
- Designer: Jerk Gustafsson
- Programmer: Jim Kjellin
- Artists: Kjell Emanuelsson; Axel Torvenius; Tor Frick
- Writers: Jens Matthies; Tommy Tordsson Björk
- Composer: Mick Gordon
- Series: Wolfenstein
- Engine: id Tech 5
- Platforms: PlayStation 3; PlayStation 4; Windows; Xbox 360; Xbox One
- Release: 20 May 2014
- Genre: First-person shooter
- Mode: Single-player

Wolfenstein: The New Order is a 2014 first-person shooter game developed by MachineGames and published by Bethesda Softworks. It was released on 20 May 2014 for PlayStation 3, PlayStation 4, Windows, Xbox 360, and Xbox One. The game is the sixth main entry in the Wolfenstein series and the first since 2009's Wolfenstein. Set in an alternate history 1960s Europe where the Nazis won the Second World War, the story follows war veteran William "B.J." Blazkowicz and his efforts to stop the Nazis from ruling over the world.

The game is played from a first-person perspective and most of its levels are navigated on foot. The story is arranged in chapters, which players complete in order to progress. A morality choice in the prologue alters the game's storyline; some characters and small plot points are replaced throughout the two timelines. The game features a variety of weapons, most of which can be dual wielded. A cover system is present.

Development began in 2010, soon after id Software gave MachineGames the rights for the franchise. The development team envisioned Wolfenstein: The New Order as a first-person action-adventure game, taking inspiration from previous games in the series and particularly focusing on the combat and adventure elements. The game attempts to delve into character development of Blazkowicz, unlike its predecessors—a choice from the developers to interest players in the story. They aimed to portray him in a heroic fashion.

At release, Wolfenstein: The New Order received generally positive reviews, with praise particularly directed at the combat and the narrative of the game. Critics considered it a positive change to the series and nominated it for multiple year-end accolades, including Game of the Year and Best Shooter awards from several gaming publications. A stand-alone expansion, Wolfenstein: The Old Blood, was released in May 2015 and is set before the events of the game. A sequel, Wolfenstein II: The New Colossus, was released in October 2017.

== Gameplay ==
Wolfenstein: The New Order is a first-person shooter video game with action-adventure elements, particularly in its combination of narrative-focused exploration and puzzle solving with Wolfenstein's action gameplay. To progress through the story, players fight enemies throughout levels. The game utilizes a health system in which health is divided into separate sections that regenerate; if an entire section is lost, players must use a health pack to replenish the missing health.

Players may take cover behind objects during firefights, using it as a tactical advantage and to avoid taking damage from enemies.

Players use melee attacks, firearms, and explosives to fight enemies, and may run, jump, and occasionally swim to navigate through the locations. Melee attacks can be used to silently take down enemies without being detected. Alternatively, players can approach enemies in direct combat, which often results in an intense firefight between the two parties.

A cover system can be used in combat as assistance against enemies. Players have the ability to lean around, over, and under cover, which can be used as a tactical advantage during shootouts and stealth levels. The game gives players a wide variety of weapon options; they can be found on the ground, retrieved from dead enemies, or removed from their stationary position and carried around. Weapon ammunition must be manually retrieved from the ground or from dead enemies. Players have access to a weapon inventory, which allows them to carry as many weapons as they find. With some of these weapons, players have the ability to dual wield, giving them an advantage over enemies by dealing twice as much damage. Players can customize weapons through the use of upgrades; for example, a rocket launcher can be attached to the side of an assault rifle, and a wire cutting tool can be upgraded to a laser gun.

== Synopsis ==
=== Setting and characters ===
The New Order is set in alternate history where Nazi Germany deploys advanced technologies to turn the tide against the Allies and ultimately win World War II, taking over most of the world. Its storyline is loosely connected to 2009's Wolfenstein and features returning characters Kreisau Circle leader Caroline Becker (Bonita Friedericy) and SS-Oberst-Gruppenführer Wilhelm "Deathshead" Strasse (Dwight Schultz), the nemesis of series protagonist, U.S. Army Ranger Captain William "B.J." Blazkowicz (Brian Bloom). The New Order has a branching narrative: during the prologue chapter, Deathshead forces Blazkowicz to decide the fate of one of his comrades. The player's choice as Blazkowicz will create two timeline versions of the game's storyline, where alternate characters are established as replacements for characters who otherwise would have significant roles in the plot.

After the prologue chapter, either Scottish pilot Fergus Reid (Gideon Emery) or U.S. Army Private Probst Wyatt III (A.J. Trauth) survives and escapes Deathshead's compound. Blazkowicz suffers a severe head injury during the escape attempt and lapses into a persistent vegetative state. He is brought to a psychiatric asylum in Poland, where he is cared for by its head nurse Anya Oliwa (Alicja Bachleda), and her parents, who run the facility under the Nazi regime. Blazkowicz watches as Anya's parents are regularly forced to hand patients over to Nazi authorities, who deem them Untermenschen for their mental disabilities and take them to Deathshead for unknown experimentation. Blazkowicz and Anya enter into a romantic relationship throughout the game's narrative.

Other major characters include Frau Engel (Nina Franoszek), the Commandant of an extermination camp in northern Croatia known as Camp Belica; Set Roth (Mark Ivanir), a member of a Jewish mystical secret society known as the Da'at Yichud who is incarcerated at Camp Belica; Bombate (Peter Macon), a Namibian prisoner of Camp Belica who assists Blazkowicz; and Max Hass (Alex Solowitz), a seemingly brain-damaged member of the Resistance who is looked after by former Nazi member Klaus Kreutz (Ken Lally).

=== Plot ===
In July 1946, the Allies, on the brink of defeat in Europe, launch a massive aerial raid against a fortress and weapons laboratory run by Deathshead. Blazkowicz, a paratrooper taking part in the operation, joins the assault but is captured inside its human experimentation laboratory. Blazkowicz escapes from the laboratory's emergency incinerator, but is severely injured and admitted to a Polish psychiatric asylum where he remains in a catatonic state. When a Nazi death squad orders the asylum to be "shut down" and executes Anya's parents when they resist, Blazkowicz regains consciousness and eliminates the extermination squad before fleeing with Anya to her grandparents' farm.

When Blazkowicz identifies himself, Anya and her grandparents reveal it is 1960 and that the Nazis defeated and occupied the United States in 1948, achieving world domination; an anti-Nazi Resistance fought back, but almost all members have been captured or killed. Blazkowicz interrogates a captured officer from the asylum and learns the top members of the Resistance are imprisoned in Berlin's Eisenwald Prison. Anya's grandparents smuggle her and Blazkowicz through a checkpoint in Stettin before they travel to Berlin. During the train ride, Blazkowicz encounters Frau Engel for the first time. When they arrive, Anya helps Blazkowicz break into Eisenwald Prison, where he rescues the person he spared fourteen years prior (Fergus or Wyatt) and learns the Resistance movement is led by Caroline, who was left paralyzed due to an incident at Isenstadt in 2009's Wolfenstein.

The Resistance executes an attack on a Nazi research facility in London, bombing their operations base and stealing secret documents and prototype stealth helicopters. The documents reveal the Nazis are relying on reverse-engineered technology derived from the Da'at Yichud, which created inventions such as energy weapons, computer artificial intelligence, and super concrete; however, it is revealed that someone is tampering with the super concrete's formula, making it susceptible to mold deterioration. The Resistance discovers a match with Set, who is imprisoned in Camp Belica. Blazkowicz agrees to go undercover inside Camp Belica and meets Set, who tells him that the Nazis have co-opted Da'at Yichud technology to mass-produce and control robots, and offers to help the Resistance in return for the destruction of the camp. Blazkowicz finds a battery for a device that controls Camp Belica's robots, which he and Set use to incapacitate Engel, destroy the camp, and liberate its prisoners.

Set reveals that the Nazis' discovery of one of the Da'at Yichud caches, which included advanced technology centuries ahead of its time, allowed Germany to surpass the Allies in military might. Set agrees to assist the Resistance by revealing the location of one such cache but states that the Resistance requires a U-boat to access it. Blazkowicz and the Resistance hijack a U-boat, the flagship Eva's Hammer, and learn it is equipped with a nuclear cannon that requires keycodes from the Nazi lunar research facility to operate. Blazkowicz uses the Spindly Torque—a Da'at Yichud spherical device capable of destroying super concrete—to steal the identity of a Nazi lunar scientist and infiltrate the Lunar Base. He succeeds at obtaining the keycodes, but upon returning to Earth, he discovers that Engel has mounted an assault on the Resistance base, killing several members and capturing the survivors on behalf of Deathshead.

The Resistance use the Spindly Torque to breach Deathshead's fortress. After liberating Deathshead's captives, Blazkowicz travels to the top of the tower, where Deathshead's workshop is located. Inside, Deathshead reveals to Blazkowicz that he possesses the preserved brain of the soldier Blazkowicz chose to die, and uses it to power a robot that fights Blazkowicz. Blazkowicz defeats the robot and destroys the brain, putting his friend to rest. Commandeering a larger robot mecha, Deathshead attacks Blazkowicz, who gets the upper hand and destroys the robot. He drags Deathshead out of the wreckage and attacks him, but Deathshead arms a grenade that kills himself and gravely wounds Blazkowicz. Crawling to a window, Blazkowicz mentally recites "The New Colossus" as he watches the Resistance survivors board a helicopter. Believing they have reached safety, Blazkowicz gives instructions to fire the nuclear cannon. After the credits, a helicopter is heard approaching.

== Development ==
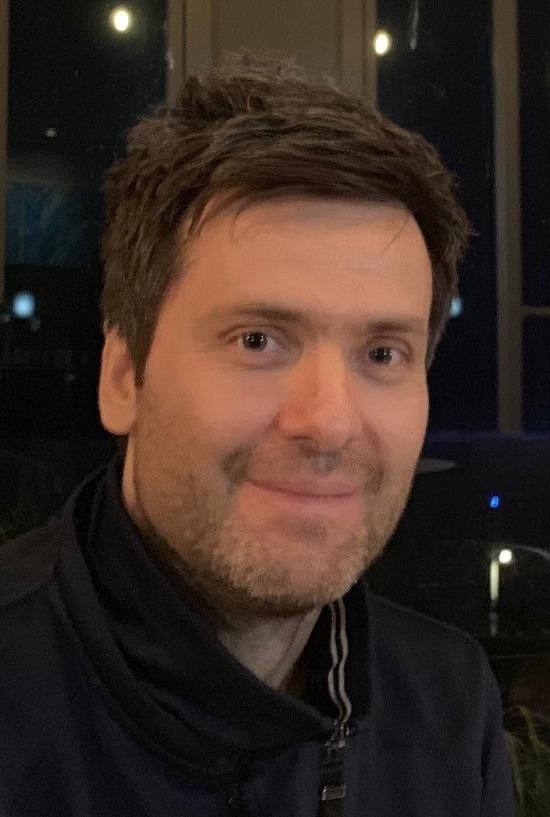
Jerk Gustafsson

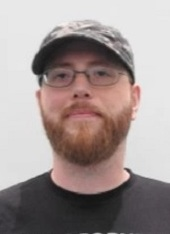
Jens Matthies

Gustafsson served as the game's executive producer, while Matthies was the creative director and co-writer.

After developer MachineGames was founded, the employees began brainstorming ideas, and pitching them to publishers. In June 2009, MachineGames owner ZeniMax Media acquired id Software and all of its property, including Doom, Quake and Wolfenstein. Bethesda Softworks, who had previously declined a pitch from MachineGames, suggested that they develop a new game from a franchise acquired by ZeniMax. MachineGames inquired about developing a new game in the Wolfenstein series; the studio visited id Software, who approved of MachineGames' request for a new Wolfenstein game. By November 2010, paperwork was signed, allowing MachineGames to develop Wolfenstein: The New Order. Preliminary development lasted approximately three years.

The existence of Wolfenstein: The New Order was first acknowledged by Bethesda Softworks on 7 May 2013, through the release of an announcement trailer. Prior to this, Bethesda teased the upcoming project by releasing three images with the caption "1960". Though originally due for release in late 2013, the game was delayed to 2014 in order for the developers to further "polish" the game. In February 2014, it was announced that The New Order would launch on 20 May 2014 in North America, on 22 May 2014 in Australia, and on 23 May 2014 in Europe. The Australian and European release dates were later pushed forward, resulting in a worldwide launch on 20 May 2014. All pre-orders granted an access code to Doom's beta, developed by id Software. In accordance with Strafgesetzbuch section 86a, the German release of The New Order had all Nazi symbols and references removed. The German software ratings board, Unterhaltungssoftware Selbstkontrolle, later introduced the "social adequacy clause", which allowed the use of such imagery in relevant scenarios, reviewed on a case-by-case basis. Bethesda made the uncensored international version, which lacks German as a language option, available for purchase in Germany on 22 November 2019, while continuing to sell the censored and localised version separately. Following the game's release, MachineGames began developing Wolfenstein: The Old Blood, a standalone expansion pack set before the events of The New Order. It was released in May 2015.

=== Gameplay design ===
The initial inspiration for Wolfenstein: The New Order came from previous games in the franchise. Senior gameplay designer Andreas Öjerfors said that it was the "super intense immersive combat" that defined the previous games, so MachineGames ensured that this element was included in The New Order. The development team refer to the game as a "first-person action adventure", naming this one of the unique defining points of the game. "It is the David vs Goliath theme", Öjerfors explained. "B.J. against a global empire of Nazis." Öjerfors acknowledged that many aspects of the game's narrative are exaggerated elements of the Nazi Party: "The larger than life leaders, strange technology, strange experiments." The team viewed the game as a "dark-roasted blend of drama, mystery, humor". Creative director Jens Matthies explained that they "take perhaps the most iconic first-person shooter franchise in history and push it into a strange new world".

Development was conducted on the id Tech 5 engine, which allowed the developers to scale the game equally between different platforms.

Wolfenstein: The New Order is the second game to use id Software's id Tech 5 engine, after Rage (2011). The game utilizes the engine to add a large amount of detail to the game world. The team often found it difficult to develop the game with 1080p resolution at 60 frames per second, particularly on complex environments, but "we always made it work somehow", said Matthies. He has said that the main advantages of the engine is the speed and the detailing, while its biggest disadvantage is dynamic lighting; "on the other hand the static light rendering is really awesome, so you have full radiosity and can do really spectacular-looking things using that," he added. Senior concept artist Axel Torvenius said that one of the main inspirations for the art design of the game was films from the 1960s, calling out the James Bond movies. The design for the Nazis in the game was influenced by the aesthetics of the Nazis at the end of the World War II; "it's blended with the style of the 1960s and the fashion ideals of how to express yourself visually", Öjerfors explained. This viewpoint is influenced by the element of exaggeration, which is common throughout the game's design and has been acknowledged by the team as a development inspiration. Character models can be covered in up to a 256k texture; however, this is not used often in the game on individual characters, due to the difficulty of seeing it from a distance.

Wolfenstein: The New Order only features a single-player mode. The team felt that dividing focus and resources across both a single-player and an online multiplayer mode would be less efficient. When questioned about the lack of an online multiplayer mode, Öjerfors explained that the decision was simple. "If we could take every bit of energy and sweat the studio has and pour all that into the single-player campaign, it gives us the resources to make something very, very cool, compared to if we would also have to divert some of our resources to making multiplayer." Executive producer Jerk Gustafsson attributed the choice to the style of game the team is familiar with, stating that MachineGames is "a single-player studio".

=== Characters and setting ===
The team attempted to develop characters that offer a unique experience to the game. "The overarching goal for us was about building an ensemble of genuinely interesting characters we wanted to interact with", said Matthies. They strived to connect the thoughts and actions of all characters to the human experience, allowing players to know "why a person is doing what they are doing". Matthies feels that all characters, particularly the allies, contain some dimension of his own personality. "They're an expression of something that is part of me that I think is interesting to explore", he said.

The game's playable character, William "B.J." Blazkowicz, has been previously featured as the playable protagonist of all Wolfenstein games. When developing the character of Blazkowicz for The New Order, MachineGames considered his appearances in previous games in the series. When doing this, they realised that the character had never really developed at all throughout the games; "He's just the guy that you play", said Pete Hines, Vice President of PR and Marketing for Bethesda. The team discovered that they were interested in exploring his story, which is what they later invested in. Throughout the game, Blazkowicz communicates some of his inner thoughts through short monologues, many of which reveal that he has been traumatized by some of his experiences. "We always loved the idea of a prototypical action hero exterior juxtaposed with a rich and vulnerable interior psychology", said Matthies. One of the largest priorities for the team when developing the character of Blazkowicz was to "reveal whatever needs to be revealed to [Blazkowicz] and the player" simultaneously; Matthies felt that, despite the simplicity of this concept, it is rarely used in games. Prior to developing The New Order, the team had primarily worked on games that involved antihero protagonists. However, id Software wished Blazkowicz to be portrayed differently in the game. Matthies said, "It's really important to [id] that BJ is a hero, and not an anti-hero." The team attempted to develop Blazkowicz into a character that players could relate to, as they felt that players are generally unable to relate to video game protagonists. "The goal is not to have a protagonist that's so neutral that you can project yourself into them; the goal is to have a protagonist that is so relatable that you become them", said Matthies. They tried to make players become "emotionally in sync" with Blazkowicz, using the morality choice in the game's prologue to do so.

Wilhelm "Deathshead" Strasse, the game's main antagonist, has been previously featured as an antagonist of Return to Castle Wolfenstein (2001) and main antagonist of Wolfenstein (2009). For The New Order, the team achieved closure on his story; to do so in an effective way, they wanted to find an interesting angle to portray him: his personality is full of enthusiasm, and he appreciates life after his near-death experience in the previous game. When developing the Nazis, Matthies states that the team "didn't want to cartoon-ify them", instead opting to treat them seriously. Gideon Emery, who portrayed Fergus Reid, auditioned for his role in the game. He described Fergus as "a tough as nails soldier, who gives [Blazkowicz] both support and a pretty hard time in the process". Matthies felt that Fergus is a type of father figure to Blazkowicz, and that he "only gives negative reinforcement". Conversely, he saw Wyatt as a "sort of son surrogate", as Blazkowicz is tasked as being his protector and mentor, and that he gives "positive reinforcement". Max Hass was inspired by the character of Garp from John Irving's novel The World According to Garp. "Max was the most challenging character to cast, which seems counter-intuitive because he's a pretty simple guy on paper, but it took a tremendous actor to pull that off and a long time to find him", Matthies said.

A large aspect of the game is the alternate history in which it is set, where the Nazis won the Second World War. The team saw this aspect as an opportunity to create everything at a very large scale, with very few limitations; "so many things that we can create, and work with, and expand on. So, I never really felt that we were limited", said Öjerfors.

=== Music production ===
Wolfenstein: The New Order makes use of an original score that reflects the alternate universe depicted in the game. "We wanted to identify with different sounds that were kind of iconic, 1960s sounds, and then do our own twist on them to make a sound authentic enough that it felt realistic", said Hines. The team placed a high importance on the game's music. During the game's development, composer Mick Gordon traveled to Sweden to meet with the team, and he spotted the game over three days, partly collaborating with both Fredrik Thordendal and Richard Devine. Gordon expressed the difference in composing the soundtrack for Wolfenstein: The New Order compared to other games: "Usually you sign onto a project and then you're given a list of 150 battle cues to do."

"The New Order"
"The New Order", the game's main theme, was composed by Mick Gordon. He collaborated with a few other musicians to produce the original score for the game.

The team began searching for a genre on which to base the soundtrack. They initially sought inspiration from the music of Richard Wagner, who was admired by Nazi Party leader Adolf Hitler. After studying Wagner's work, however, the team discovered that it did not necessarily fit with the game's tone. They searched for a style of music that would suit the Nazis, ultimately selecting distortion. "There's lots of analogue distortion types, there's all sorts of different pedals and valves and things that are really breaking up", said Gordon. They also took inspiration from 1960s music, using analogue equipment such as tape machines and reel-to-reel machines. Gordon has said that the soundtrack is "a tribute to all things guitar". In collaboration with each other, the team of musicians composed over six hours of music which scores the game. Matthies said, "A lot of the score features odd time signatures yet it's all very groovy."

Bethesda, AKQA, and COPILOT Music and Sound collaborated on the marketing campaign for Wolfenstein: The New Order to invent the fictional state-owned German record label Neumond Recording Company. The campaign was crafted to introduce the video game's alternate history in the form of pop music from the 1960s. The label promoted ten fictional German pop artists: seven original songs, and three covers reworked into German from their original versions. Each artist was given a full biography, and the singles were packaged with album cover artwork. The covered songs were featured in trailers but omitted from the game because the songs' owners did not want their work to be associated with Nazi imagery. (Note: "Boom Boom" by John Lee Hooker, "The House of the Rising Sun" by The Animals, and "Nowhere to Run" by Martha and the Vandellas were all rewritten in German.) The original songs created for the Neumond label were initially written in English to ensure that the lyrics reflected Wolfenstein's alternate history without creating content that could be used for actual propaganda outside of the game, given the sensitive nature of the game's subject matter.

== Reception ==
=== Critical response ===
Reception

Aggregate score
Aggregator	Score
Metacritic	(PC) 81/100 (XONE) 79/100 (PS4) 79/100

Review scores
Publication	Score
Destructoid	7.5/10
Eurogamer	6/10
Game Informer	8/10
GameSpot	8/10
GamesRadar+	4/5
Giant Bomb	4/5
IGN	7.8/10
Joystiq	3/5
Polygon	9/10
VideoGamer.com	6/10
Digital Spy	3/5
The Guardian	4/5

Wolfenstein: The New Order received "generally favorable" reviews, according to the review aggregator website Metacritic.

The combat mechanics of the game received praise. Daniel Hindes of GameSpot felt that the intensity and variety of the combat in the game has granted the series "a breath of fresh air", and believes that it managed to fulfill his nostalgic expectations from the series. Ryan Taljonick of GamesRadar called it "satisfying". Simon Miller of VideoGamer.com lauded the game's shooting and stealth mechanics, naming the former as "solid". Similarly, GameSpot's Hindes noted that the stealth was "simple but effective", and named it one of the best things about the game. Steve Boxer of The Guardian also called out the stealth, calling it "decent".

Colin Moriarty of IGN considered the narrative and characters one of the best features, stating that it's where the game "really shines". Matt Sakuraoka-Gilman of Computer and Video Games called the narrative "intelligently written, brilliantly voiced and highly polished". Kotaku's Mike Fahey felt somewhat divided about the story, initially finding the attempts at emotion too obvious, but ultimately feeling satisfied, calling it "spectacular". He also praised the characterization of Blazkowicz in the game. GamesRadar''s Taljonick also felt mixed about the game's characters, finding Blazkowicz interesting, but feeling as though the supporting characters were quite undeveloped, leaving players to forget about them during gameplay. Conversely, Matt Bertz of Game Informer noted that the attempts to give Blazkowicz more depth feel odd in reflection to his brutal actions during other parts of the game. VideoGamer.com's Miller also felt negatively about the narrative, calling it "awful". Joystiq's Ludwig Kietzmann commented on the drastic changes in the narrative's pacing, feeling that it "dragged down" whenever the player is forced to search for ammunition; Steven O'Donnell of Good Game believed otherwise, feeling like he was "gearing up and patching up" after each fight.

In the midst of World War II, the Nazis drop an atomic bomb on Manhattan, settling their victory. Reviewers praised the use of this alternate history within the game.

The game's use of an alternate history concept, with the Axis victory in World War II, was commended by many reviewers. IGN's Moriarty and GameSpot's Hindes called it "interesting", with the former naming it one of the standout points of the game. Jason Hill of The Sydney Morning Herald called the concept "absorbing", while Owen Anslow of The Mirror called it "intriguing". Destructoid's Chris Carter felt that the development team "went all the way" and spent a lot of time on the game's concept.

The graphical design of the game received commentary from reviewers. GameSpot's Hindes praised the visual design, noting that it accurately captured the time period, while effectively depicting the alternate storyline in which the game is set. Taljonick of GamesRadar stated that the game's level design contributes to his enjoyment of the shooting sequences. He also praised the size of the levels, enjoying the possibility of participating in a large gunfight "with some sort of plan". Kotaku's Fahey praised the level design for similar reasons, admiring the degree of detail in the game. Digital Spy's Liam Martin shared mixed commentary on the design, noting that the character models are animated well, but the game is "hardly a shining example of next-gen graphical potential". ABC's Alex Walker criticized the game's graphical design, commenting that the developers "focus[ed] their attention" on other aspects of the game.

Most critics and commentators shared the opinion that The New Order was better than they were expecting from a Wolfenstein game. Jon Blyth of Official Xbox Magazine called the game an "unexpected gem", while ABC's Walker said that he "never expected [to] enjoy [the game] so much". The Sydney Morning Herald's Hill said that the game ensures that the series is "a relevant force again", while Destructoid's Carter felt that the game "does wonders for essentially rebooting the franchise without rendering all the previous stories moot". Edge agreed, calling the developers "brave". Tom Watson wrote in New Statesman that The New Order was "the big surprise of the year" for "modernis[ing] this old classic", praising its graphics, game play, and plot.

=== Sales ===
Within a week of its release, Wolfenstein: The New Order became the second best-selling game of 2014 in the United Kingdom, behind Titanfall. The game topped the weekly UK charts in its first week, totaling a quarter of all games sold in the region and accounting for 36% of revenue. According to MCV, it was the 22nd best-selling game of 2014 in the UK. In the United States, the game was the fourth and seventh best-selling game of May and June 2014, respectively. The game was ranked the fifth and fourteenth best-selling digital PlayStation 4 game of May and June 2014, respectively. In its first week in Japan, the PlayStation 3 and PlayStation 4 versions of the game were placed on the charts at 15th and 8th, respectively, collectively selling over 11,000 units. By June 2014, the game had sold almost 400,000 physical units in Europe, equating to over €21 million.

=== Awards ===
Wolfenstein: The New Order received multiple nominations and awards from gaming publications. The game won Game of the Year from Classic Game Room, received nominations from the Golden Joystick Awards, Good Game, Game Informer, and IGN Australia, and received runner-up from Polygon. It was also placed on various lists of the best games of 2014: USA Today placed it at 9th, Eurogamer at 10th, and Ars Technica at 6th. The game also received nominations for Best Shooter from The Escapist, The Game Awards, Game Informer, GameTrailers, Hardcore Gamer, and IGN. It received nominations signifying excellence in storytelling from The Game Awards, the Golden Joystick Awards, IGN Australia, and the SXSW Gaming Awards. It achieved runner-up for Biggest Surprise awards from both Giant Bomb and the readers of Kotaku. It was also nominated for Best PC Game by IGN Australia, receiving runner-up by Kotaku readers. The game was also nominated for Best Multiplatform from Hardcore Gamer, Best Console Game from IGN Australia, and Best PlayStation 3 Game, Best Xbox 360 Game, and Best Xbox One Game from IGN.

Award	Date	Category	Nominee	Result	Ref.
D.I.C.E. Awards	5 February 2015	Action Game of the Year	Wolfenstein: The New Order	Nominated	
The Game Awards	5 December 2014	Best Narrative	Wolfenstein: The New Order	Nominated	
The Game Awards	5 December 2014	Best Shooter	Wolfenstein: The New Order	Nominated	
Game Developers Choice Awards	4 March 2015	Best Technology	Wolfenstein: The New Order	Nominated	
Golden Joystick Awards	24 October 2014	Best Gaming Moment	The timeline choice	Nominated	
Golden Joystick Awards	24 October 2014	Best Storytelling	Wolfenstein: The New Order	Nominated	
Golden Joystick Awards	24 October 2014	Game of the Year	Wolfenstein: The New Order	Nominated	
SXSW Gaming Awards	14 March 2015	Excellence in Narrative	Wolfenstein: The New Order	Nominated	

== Sequel ==
At E3 2017, Bethesda announced Wolfenstein II: The New Colossus, a sequel to The New Order. It was released on 27 October 2017.
