= Wolfenstein =

Video game series

- Logo as of The New Order
- Genres: First-person shooter, action-adventure, stealth
- Developers: Muse Software (1981–1984); id Software (1992, 2008); Gray Matter Studios (2001); Splash Damage (2003); Fountainhead Entertainment (2008); Raven Software (2009); MachineGames (2014–present); Arkane Lyon (2019)
- Publishers: Muse Software (1981–1984); Apogee Software (1992); FormGen (1992); Activision (2001–2003, 2009); EA Mobile (2008); Bethesda Softworks (2014–present)
- Creator: Silas Warner
- Platforms: 3DO Interactive Multiplayer; Acorn Archimedes; Amiga 1200; AmigaOS 4; Apple II; Atari Jaguar; Classic Mac OS; Commodore 64; Game Boy Advance; iOS; Microsoft Windows; macOS; MS-DOS; NEC PC-9801; Nintendo Switch; PlayStation 2; PlayStation 3; PlayStation 4; Stadia; Super Nintendo Entertainment System; Windows Mobile; Xbox; Xbox 360; Xbox One
- First release: Castle Wolfenstein; September 1981
- Latest release: Wolfenstein: Cyberpilot; July 26, 2019

Wolfenstein is a series of alternate history World War II video games originally developed by Muse Software. The majority of the games follow William "B.J." Blazkowicz, an American Army captain, and his fight against the Axis powers. Earlier titles are centered around Nazi attempts to harness supernatural and occult forces, while later games are set after the Nazis successfully implement various science fiction technologies to achieve victory in World War II.

The first two games in the series, Castle Wolfenstein and Beyond Castle Wolfenstein, focused on stealth-based gameplay from a top-down perspective. Beginning with id Software's Wolfenstein 3D, they shifted to, and helped popularize, the first-person shooter genre. After ZeniMax Media acquired id Software, including the Wolfenstein franchise, developer MachineGames became the series' primary developer.

== History ==
=== 1981–1992: Muse Software ===
The series presents an action-heavy take on the fight against Nazi Germany, as shown here in Wolfenstein: The New Order

Castle Wolfenstein was developed by programmer Silas Warner, along with Dale Gray and George Varndell, and published in 1981 by his company M.U.S.E. Inc. (later known as Muse Software). Warner is cited as a pioneer in the early eras of video gaming, especially in the stealth genre.

Castle Wolfenstein was initially conceptualized by Warner after he saw the 1961 British-American war film The Guns of Navarone, which follows the efforts of an Allied commando unit as they attempt to destroy a seemingly impenetrable German fortress. That same day, Warner played the multi-directional shooter arcade game Berzerk, in which the player navigates through a maze with laser-shooting robots. After playing the game, Warner thought about taking the design of Berzerk and replacing the robots with Nazis. He eventually settled on the idea of a game based on the arcade shoot 'em up genre, where players dodge enemies with the intent of killing them, but instead changing the objective to escape the enemy guards and their castle, not necessarily to kill and destroy them; this made shooting guards a means to an end and not an end in itself.

Castle Wolfenstein is often credited as one of the first video games in the stealth genre, as it focuses more on avoiding or disarming enemies, and killing them is considered a last resort. Castle Wolfenstein was the first computer game to feature digitized speech and influenced the development of other similar game franchises such as Metal Gear and Thief. Muse Software released the follow-up, Beyond Castle Wolfenstein in 1984 before the company legally disestablished on October 7, 1987.

=== 1992–2001: id Software ===
In November 1991, the recently established video game development company id Software, founded by programmers John Carmack and John Romero, game designer Tom Hall, and artist Adrian Carmack, were planning their next major game after finishing their contract with their former employer Softdisk. After an initial suggestion for a science fiction game by Hall titled It's Green and Pissed, about fighting mutants in a research lab, Romero proposed a 3D remake of Castle Wolfenstein. The team gravitated to the idea as Hall, Romero, and John Carmack had all enjoyed playing the 1981 original Castle Wolfenstein. The team initially believed they would not be able to use the name but found that the trademark had already lapsed by 1986.

Production for Wolfenstein 3D began on December 15, 1991. Romero pitched the idea as a 3D version of Castle Wolfenstein and the team initially planned to include many of the same features that Castle Wolfenstein and its sequel had introduced, such as dragging and looting dead bodies, and opening crates. They began to implement other ideas inspired by the stealth aspect of Castle Wolfenstein such as swapping uniforms with guards, and stealth attacking enemies; the team was able to get it working so if a guard saw a dead body they tried finding the player. However, the stealth related features were eventually removed as Romero found that they impeded the flow of the game; Romero stated in an interview that "the problem is that the game came to a dead stop when you did these things... we didn't want to slow it down so we actually removed the features and left it fast." As Romero further explained in another interview: "The game was most fun when it was a breakneck run through maps with tons of blasting down Nazis. Anything that slowed down that gameplay had to go."

id's Wolfenstein 3D was released on May 5, 1992, and published by Apogee Software. The game has been credited with helping to establish the first-person shooter genre, and marked a new direction for the franchise itself. 3D was the first game to feature a first-person view and 3D graphics, breaking away from the more reserved gameplay of Castle Wolfenstein that valued stealth and resource management. The game instead adapted the run and gun style that would set the template for the first-person shooter genre. Wolfenstein 3D was the first game to feature William "B.J." Blazkowicz, an American spy of Polish Jewish descent, who would become the main protagonist of the series.

id Software was hoping to make around $60,000 from the game upon its release. By the end of 1993, the game had sold over 100,000 copies, plus a further 100,000 units of its prequel Wolfenstein 3D: Spear of Destiny.

== Games ==
Release timeline Main series in bold
1981	**Castle Wolfenstein**
1982
1983
1984	**Beyond Castle Wolfenstein**
1985
1986
1987
1988
1989
1990
1991
1992	**Wolfenstein 3D**
1992	Spear of Destiny
1993
1994
1995
1996
1997
1998
1999
2000
2001	**Return to Castle Wolfenstein**
2002
2003	Wolfenstein: Enemy Territory
2004
2005
2006
2007
2008	Wolfenstein RPG
2009	**Wolfenstein**
2010
2011
2012
2013
2014	**Wolfenstein: The New Order**
2015	Wolfenstein: The Old Blood
2016
2017	**Wolfenstein II: The New Colossus**
2018
2019	Wolfenstein: Youngblood
2019	Wolfenstein: Cyberpilot
2020
2021
2022
2023
2024
2025
TBA	Wolfenstein 3

Aggregate review scores
Game	Metacritic
Wolfenstein 3D	(GBA) 57 (PS3) 77 (X360) 66
Return to Castle Wolfenstein	(PC) 88 (PS2) 66 (Xbox) 84
Wolfenstein: Enemy Territory	(PC) 90
Wolfenstein	(PC) 74 (PS3) 71 (X360) 72
Wolfenstein: The New Order	(PC) 81 (PS4) 79 (XONE) 79
Wolfenstein: The Old Blood	(PC) 76 (PS4) 77 (XONE) 76
Wolfenstein II: The New Colossus	(PC) 86 (PS4) 87 (XONE) 88 (NS) 79
Wolfenstein: Youngblood	(PC) 69 (PS4) 72 (XONE) 64 (NS) 67

=== Castle Wolfenstein (1981) ===
A stealth-adventure game set during World War II, in which the player controls an unnamed American prisoner of war as he steals German files containing secret war plans. The main goal is to escape the eponymous Nazi stronghold, while avoiding, disarming, or at times killing hostile guards.

The inaugural game in the franchise was developed and published by M.U.S.E. Inc. in 1981.

=== Beyond Castle Wolfenstein (1984) ===
A sequel to Castle Wolfenstein set in World War II during Adolf Hitler's rule as Chancellor of Germany. The objective of the game is to traverse all the levels of the secret Berlin bunker where Hitler is holding secret meetings with his senior staff. The player must retrieve a bomb that the operatives have placed inside the bunker and place it outside the door of the room where Hitler is holding his meeting, a scenario bearing a passing resemblance to the July 20 Plot.

Beyond Castle Wolfenstein was the second and final title developed and published by Muse Software, and was released in 1984. After the death of the original designer of the program, the widow of Silas Warner released a ported version of the game, as well as its reconstructed source code in his honor in 2004.

=== Wolfenstein 3D (1992) ===
After the Nazis apprehend an American spy, William "B.J." Blazkowicz, who was sent to sabotage the enemy's regime and foil their schemes, they imprison him under the grounds of Castle Wolfenstein. Finding a way to incapacitate a prison guard, B.J. manages to arm himself with a stolen pistol and advance through the subterranean floors of the castle, on his way to accomplish his mission by uncovering the truth behind 'Operation Eisenfaust' and destroy it.

Wolfenstein 3D was the first game in the series to be developed by id Software, and published by Apogee Software. It marked the series transition to the first-person shooter genre, a genre that the game would go on to popularize.

==== Spear of Destiny ====
Spear of Destiny is a stand-alone expansion pack for Wolfenstein 3D that was developed by id Software, and published by FormGen Corporation. Set before the events of Wolfenstein 3D, the player assumes the role of William "B.J." Blazkowicz, who is set to reclaim the Spear of Destiny from the Nazis after it was stolen from Versailles. Spear of Destiny had two expansion packs developed by FormGen "Return to Danger" and "Ultimate Challenge".

=== Return to Castle Wolfenstein (2001) ===
Two operatives of an allied espionage agency, William "B.J." Blazkowicz and Agent One are captured by the Nazis and imprisoned in Castle Wolfenstein during their attempt to investigate rumours surrounding one of Heinrich Himmler's personal projects, the SS Paranormal Division. Agent One is killed during the interrogation, while Blazkowicz escapes custody, fighting his way out of the castle. As the challenge is still afoot, Blazkowicz discovers that the Nazis are constructing a plan called 'Operation Resurrection', which oversees resurrecting the dead as well as dealing with supernatural elements, using them for their own advantage to win World War II against the Allied powers.

The game was developed by Gray Matter Studios and published by Activision, and released in 2001 on Microsoft Windows. The game would be ported to consoles two years later.

=== Wolfenstein: Enemy Territory (2003) ===
Originally planned to be released as an expansion pack to Return to Castle Wolfenstein, Enemy Territory was instead released as a standalone, free to play multiplayer title. Instead of a single-player campaign mode and storyline, the game features an expanded edition of the previous title's multiplayer. The game was developed by Splash Damage and published by Activision.

A commercial follow-up, called Enemy Territory: Quake Wars, was later released in 2007.

=== Wolfenstein RPG (2008) ===
In a mission to investigate the Paranormal Division of the Axis military, William "B.J." Blazkowicz is captured and held prisoner in The Tower. He escapes the enemy forces, and sets himself to stop them and their operation that involves supernatural activities once and for all, infiltrating Castle Wolfenstein to continue his escapade deep inside.

It is a mobile phone game developed by Fountainhead Entertainment, and published by EA Mobile in 2008. John Carmack, one of the key people of Wolfenstein 3D, reprised his role as the sole programmer.

=== Wolfenstein (2009) ===
Blazkowicz discovers an unnatural medallion containing supernatural powers while on a mission on a German battleship. Learning the Nazis had begun digging deep into crystal mines to obtain more of the material, the OSA sends their operative to the fictional town of Isenstadt, which the Nazis had taken complete control of in order to excavate rare Nachtsonne crystals necessary to access the "Black Sun" dimension.

The 2009 game was a loose sequel to Return to Castle Wolfenstein developed by Raven Software, produced by id Software, and published by Activision.

=== Wolfenstein: The New Order (2014) ===
The New Order is set after the end of World War II, in an alternate universe where the Axis powers won World War II. In 1946, as the Nazis expand their regime over the world, OSA agent William "B.J." Blazkowicz is sent to assassinate General Deathshead, as part of a last all-out effort by Allied airborne and commando forces. The mission is a failure and, after the unit is slaughtered by Nazi forces, Blazkowicz barely escapes the compound, sustaining a critical head injury which renders him unconscious and subsequently puts him in a coma.

In 1960, fourteen years later, B.J. finds himself settled in an asylum, unaware of the events that took place during his coma, and about to be executed by the Nazis who have ordered the asylum liquidated. Awakened into full strength, Blazkowicz fights his way out of the building, escaping with a wounded nurse, Anya. B.J. locates the Resistance and helps them fight the Nazis, dismantling them and ultimately crippling their dominance around the world.

After the publishing rights were moved from Activision to Bethesda Softworks following ZeniMax Media's acquisition of id Software, development on The New Order began in 2010 by MachineGames.

=== Wolfenstein: The Old Blood (2015) ===
A prequel to The New Order, The Old Blood follows William "B.J." Blazkowicz and Richard Wesley, also known as Agent One, who are sent to infiltrate Castle Wolfenstein and obtain a top secret folder that contains the whereabouts of General Deathshead. The mission goes awry as they are discovered by the Nazi troopers and are captured. During brutal interrogation, Agent One is killed, but Blazkowicz manages to evade the Nazi forces and escape the castle. With the aid of Kessler, the leader of a local resistance group, he discovers that the folder is held by Helga von Schabbs, a Nazi neurologist who has just arrived in the village of Wulfburg. Evidence begins to emerge of supernatural activities taking place under the command of von Schabbs, who is conducting an archaeological excavation in an attempt to find a hidden underground vault containing occult knowledge previously possessed by German King Otto I.

The game is a loose remake of Return to Castle Wolfenstein, with similarities in the storylines of the two games, as well as the existence of various characters as homages to the ones from the older title. Developed by MachineGames and published by Bethesda Softworks, the game is a stand-alone expansion to The New Order, and was released in 2015.

=== Wolfenstein II: The New Colossus (2017) ===
Set five months after the events of The New Order, "B.J." Blazkowicz awakens from the coma he succumbed to in the aftermath of surviving a near-fatal explosion, residing on a stolen Nazi U-boat commandeered by the Wiesenau Kreis, also known as the Kreisau Circle. After an attack ensues on the base orchestrated by Frau Engel, many of the resistance members are captured, and the leader of the group is killed. Escaping the clutches of Nazi forces with the rest of the team, Blazkowicz takes over the leadership of the Resistance and proceeds to what would have been the next step in the plan to liberate America from the Nazis and use the country as a center base to free the rest of the world from their monstrous regime. Recruiting new members to the resistance along the way, Blazkowicz and the group intend to assassinate prominent leaders in the Nazi regime to bring the public conscious into the idea of liberty and freedom, thus urging everyone to rise against the hefty powers who are running the government. But, before they ignite the operation, the resistance must attack and take over Engel's airship, the Ausmerzer, to disable its use against their own by the Nazis, and hijack its command systems in order to start a revolution, thus reclaiming the land of freedom that was once theirs.

The New Colossus is the third title in the series to be developed by MachineGames and published by Bethesda Softworks. It was released on multiple platforms in 2017.

=== Wolfenstein: Youngblood (2019) ===
Two decades after liberating the United States from Nazi occupation in the Second American Revolution in 1961, the newest members of the Global Resistance, twin sisters Jessie and Zofia Blazkowicz, embark on a search mission to France in the capital city of Paris when B.J., their father, goes missing in action. As they task themselves to locate and reclaim B.J., they must also fight the still-remaining Nazi regime in Europe.

Youngblood was developed by MachineGames in collaboration with Arkane Studios and was published by Bethesda Softworks on July 26, 2019. The game can be played in single-player and multiplayer modes for the story campaign. Those who purchase the Deluxe edition of the game are able to invite other players to their sessions, regardless of whether the invitee owns the game.

=== Wolfenstein: Cyberpilot (2019) ===
Set twenty years after the events of The New Colossus, the protagonist is depicted as a computer hacker known as Cyberpilot who works for the French Resistance against the Nazi regime.

Cyberpilot is a side story that takes place chronologically a week prior to the events of Youngblood. Unlike previous entries, Cyberpilot is a virtual reality experience. The game was developed by MachineGames and Arkane Lyon, and published by Bethesda. The game was released alongside Youngblood on the same day to mixed reviews.

=== Wolfenstein III (TBA) ===
According to MachineGames studio head Jerk Gustafsson, the Wolfenstein reboot was "always" meant to be told in three parts. Wolfenstein III was in development by January 2026 and formally entered production in November.

== Television series ==
In 2012, movie producer Samuel Hadida and Panorama Media announced plans to make a film adaptation of Wolfenstein, with Roger Avary attached to write and direct.

In July 2025, a television series adaptation was announced to be in development at Amazon MGM Studios, with Patrick Somerville as creator and showrunner, and Jonathan Nolan, Lisa Joy, Athena Wickham, James Altman, and Jerk Gustafsson as executive producers.
