= MachineGames =

Swedish video game developer

MachineGames Sweden AB
- Type: Subsidiary
- Industry: Video games
- Founded: 2009; 17 years ago
- Founders: Kjell Emanuelsson; Jerk Gustafsson; Magnus Högdahl; Jim Kjellin; Fredrik Ljungdahl; Jens Matthies; Michael Wynne
- Headquarters: Uppsala, Sweden
- Number of locations: 2 (2024)
- Key people: Jerk Gustafsson (studio director); Lars Johansson (managing director)
- Products: Wolfenstein series (2014–present); Indiana Jones and the Great Circle (2024)
- Number of employees: 162 (2024)
- Parent: ZeniMax Media (2010–present)
- Website: machinegames.com

MachineGames Sweden AB is a Swedish video game developer based in Uppsala. The studio was founded in 2009 by seven former employees of Starbreeze Studios, including founder Magnus Högdahl. After unsuccessfully pitching game ideas to several publishers, MachineGames agreed with Bethesda Softworks to develop an entry in the Wolfenstein series in July 2010 and was acquired by Bethesda's parent company, ZeniMax Media, in November. In the Wolfenstein series, MachineGames developed The New Order (2014), The Old Blood (2015), The New Colossus (2017), Youngblood (2019), and Cyberpilot (2019). The studio also developed Indiana Jones and the Great Circle (2024) and is developing another Wolfenstein game in addition to being creatively involved in a planned Wolfenstein live-action series for Amazon Prime Video.

== History ==
MachineGames' founding team—consisting of Kjell Emanuelsson, Jerk Gustafsson, Magnus Högdahl, Jim Kjellin, Fredrik Ljungdahl, Jens Matthies, and Michael Wynne—was previously employed by Swedish video game company Starbreeze Studios, of which Högdahl was also the founder. By mid-2009, while the team was working on the game Syndicate, Starbreeze had grown to more than 100 employees, and the seven-piece team wanted to start anew. All seven left the studio and set up MachineGames in Uppsala, Sweden. An alternative name considered for the company was "Tungsten". Matthies became the company's creative director, while Gustafsson became managing director and executive producer. Högdahl and Wynne left shortly thereafter for personal reasons. For the first one-and-a-half years, the MachineGames team brainstormed game ideas and pitched them to various publishers, including Bethesda Softworks, being rejected on all of them. Running out of funds, the team considered either selling their homes to finance the studio further or closing down the studio entirely.

Around this time, developer id Software and the rights to its Wolfenstein series of games were acquired by Bethesda's parent company, ZeniMax Media. Following this acquisition, Bethesda offered MachineGames to work on one of its intellectual properties, and when Matthies learned that no one was developing a Wolfenstein game at the time, he requested that MachineGames could develop one. Matthies, Gustafsson, and other MachineGames employees visited id Software in Mesquite, Texas, in July 2010 to discuss this prospect. Id Software was already impressed with the team's work while at Starbreeze and only requested that MachineGames use their id Tech 5 engine for the endeavour. By November, all necessary paperwork for MachineGames to develop a Wolfenstein game was completed, and the studio became a subsidiary of ZeniMax to pursue development on what would later become Wolfenstein: The New Order. MachineGames was incorporated as ZeniMax Sweden AB, which was later changed to MachineGames Sweden AB. After the acquisition, MachineGames resumed hiring. According to Gustafsson, around 70% of the company's employees at the time came from Starbreeze.

MachineGames developed Wolfenstein: The New Order (2014) and its prequel, Wolfenstein: The Old Blood (2015). In June 2016, they released Dimension of the Past, a free episode for id Software's 1996 game Quake, in celebration of the game's twentieth anniversary. At Electronic Entertainment Expo 2017, Wolfenstein II: The New Colossus, a sequel to The New Order, was announced with a release date of 27 October 2017 for Microsoft Windows, PlayStation 4 and Xbox One. MachineGames developed Wolfenstein: Youngblood, the follow-up to The New Colossus with a focus on co-operative gameplay, and Wolfenstein: Cyberpilot, a virtual reality game, both released in 2019. MachineGames created a further Quake episode, Dimension of the Machine, for the game's re-release in 2021, as well as Call of the Machine for Quake II's re-release in 2023.

Microsoft acquired ZeniMax in March 2021. A third Wolfenstein game has been in development since at least September 2018. MachineGames announced in January 2021 that it was developing a game set in the Indiana Jones film franchise, which in January 2024 was revealed as Indiana Jones and the Great Circle. In November 2023, the studio announced plans to open a satellite studio in Sundsvall, Sweden, which was expected to be fully staffed by 2025.

== Games developed ==
Year	Title	Platform(s)
2014	Wolfenstein: The New Order	PlayStation 3, PlayStation 4, Windows, Xbox 360, Xbox One
2015	Wolfenstein: The Old Blood	PlayStation 4, Windows, Xbox One
2016	Quake: Dimension of the Past	Nintendo Switch, PlayStation 4, PlayStation 5, Windows, Xbox One, Xbox Series X/S
2017	Wolfenstein II: The New Colossus	Nintendo Switch, PlayStation 4, Windows, Xbox One
2019	Wolfenstein: Youngblood	Nintendo Switch, PlayStation 4, Stadia, Windows, Xbox One
2019	Wolfenstein: Cyberpilot	PlayStation 4, Windows
2021	Quake: Dimension of the Machine	Nintendo Switch, PlayStation 4, PlayStation 5, Windows, Xbox One, Xbox Series X/S
2023	Quake II: Call of the Machine	Nintendo Switch, PlayStation 4, PlayStation 5, Windows, Xbox One, Xbox Series X/S
2024	Doom: Legacy of Rust	Nintendo Switch, PlayStation 4, PlayStation 5, Windows, Xbox One, Xbox Series X/S
2024	Indiana Jones and the Great Circle	Windows, Xbox Series X/S, PlayStation 5, Nintendo Switch 2
2026	Quake: Dawn of the Machine	Nintendo Switch, PlayStation 4, PlayStation 5, Windows, Xbox One, Xbox Series X/S
TBA	Wolfenstein 3	TBA
