= B. J. Blazkowicz =

Fictional character in the Wolfenstein series

- Wolfenstein character
- B. J. Blazkowicz in Quake Champions
- First appearance: Wolfenstein 3D (1992)
- Created by: John Carmack
- Designed by: Tom Hall
- Voiced by: Matt Kaminsky (2001); Peter Jessop (2009); Brian Bloom (2014–present); Debi Derryberry (young, 2017)
- Motion capture: Brian Bloom

In-universe information
- Nickname: Terror Billy (by the Nazis)
- Family: Rip Blazkowicz (father); Zofia Blazkowicz (mother); Anya Oliwa (wife); Jessica and Soph Blazkowicz (twin daughters)
- Nationality: American (of Polish Jewish descent)

William Joseph "B.J." Blazkowicz (Polish pronunciation: [blasˈkɔvit͡ʂ]) is a fictional character and the protagonist of the Wolfenstein series of alternate history video games starting with 1992's Wolfenstein 3D. An American spy of Polish Jewish descent, he specializes in one-man missions behind enemy lines. In addition to fighting the regular German Army he also frequently encounters bizarre Nazi experiments concerning biomechanical technology and the occult.

He was created by John Carmack and designed by Tom Hall for Wolfenstein 3D, described as a large, muscular man with dark blond hair, blue eyes, and a strong jaw. He also appeared in other Wolfenstein games, such as Wolfenstein: The New Order, Wolfenstein II: The New Colossus and was added to the 2017 video game Quake Champions.

== Concept and creation ==
B. J. Blazkowicz was created for the 1992 video game Wolfenstein 3D by John Carmack and Tom Hall. He is a large, muscular man with dark-blonde hair, blue eyes, and a strong jaw. The motion comic series created to promote 2009's Wolfenstein claims a continuous (partially retconned) timeline with Wolfenstein 3D, B.J.'s grandson, also named William Blazkowicz but primarily using the pseudonym Billy Blaze, became the titular protagonist of the Commander Keen series. Billy Blaze later became the grandfather of Doomguy, protagonist of the Doom series.

When contacted about B.J. being Jewish, a Bethesda Softworks representative said that it was "never explicitly stated," and the developer MachineGames stated that they "[left] it up to the player to interpret." However, Tom Hall stated more than thirty years after the release of Wolfenstein 3D that he had originally envisioned Blazkowicz's mother to have been Jewish, which Carmack assumed to have been the case. His voice actor, Brian Bloom, felt that B.J. is the kind of person who fights bigotry regardless of his ethnicity. In Wolfenstein II: The New Colossus, Hitler calls him "The half-breed child of a salesman and a Polish Jew".

Cast for Wolfenstein: The New Order, Brian Bloom did not know initially who he was voicing or in what, only knowing the people working on the game. He was excited when he found out, identifying it as his favorite role. He also did the motion capture for the role. Bloom discussed exploring the softer side of B.J., with him described as a "square-headed high-school jock with a heart of gold", describing how he "expresses himself physically by getting the job done", but that his inner voice is "quiet and softer and more contemplative, maybe less secure than he is forced to perpetrate to the other folks". He discussed how ubiquitous B.J. is with the concept of "shooting, stabbing, and strangling Nazis".

== Appearances ==
B. J. Blazkowicz has appeared as the protagonist in multiple games, starting with Wolfenstein 3D, where he is tasked with fighting the Nazis, including a battle against Adolf Hitler. In 2009's Wolfenstein, he returns to fight the resurgent Fourth Reich's use of a highly destructive energy of great power from the parallel world known as the Black Sun dimension, which is again pitting him against Deathshead.

The New Order establishes a new timeline that alters the previously perceived post-war profile, where Captain Blazkowicz suffers a head injury in 1946 that leaves him in a vegetative state for 14 years in a Polish asylum. In 1960, Blazkowicz awakens from his vegetative state as he is about to be executed, and joins the resistance against the Nazis who have conquered the whole world and who include his old nemesis Wilhelm "Deathshead" Strasse. This storyline is continued in The New Colossus which directly follows up on the last events of The New Order where Blazkowicz nearly dies of grenade fragmentation injuries in the final battle but promptly gets evacuated by Anya Oliwa and the surviving Kreisau resistance members under the helm of Caroline Becker. Blazkowicz spends the next five months in a coma as a result of his grave wounds.

In the spinoff Youngblood, an aged Blazkowicz goes missing and it's up to his daughters to track him down and rescue him. In June 2017, Blazkowicz was added to Quake Champions as a playable champion. His in-game abilities include dual gun wielding and limited auto-healing. In May 2012, to celebrate the 20th anniversary of Wolfenstein 3-D, Bethesda Softworks released a free B.J. Xbox Live Avatar mask.

B.J. also appears in the 2005 German film Der Goldene Nazivampir von Absam 2 – Das Geheimnis von Schloß Kottlitz. Portrayed by Daniel Krauss, B.J. tracks down Nazi scientists to disclose the secret of "miracle weapons" involving Dracula's bones In 2007, Samuel Hadida bought the rights to make a more direct adaptation of the game series and Roger Avary was given task to write and direct the project that was said to be the story of B. J. Blazkowicz's mission to Hitler's Wolf's Lair.

== Reception ==
The character has been well received, considered one of the best protagonists in video games. Spike writer Jason Cipriano felt that The New Order was the first time B.J. was given depth, as opposed to being "another American, hell-bent on ending the Nazi regime," discussing his relationships and personal motivations to fight the Nazis. GamesRadar writer Ryan Talionick felt he became more interesting, praising Brian Bloom's voice work for helping making him more believable.

Whether B.J. is Jewish was discussed by some critics; UGO.com staff speculated on his Judaism, noting that despite it not being confirmed, though called him an "honorary Jew" for having killed so many Nazis. Kotaku writer Stephen Totilo cited hints about his ethnicity, including his knowledge of Hebrew and his mother's recitation of Birkat Hagomel. Polygon writer Hunter Pauli, while discussing how uncommon Jewish characters in video games were, noted that it was unfortunate that so many were represented through stereotypes, and the only thing distinguishing B.J. from the others is that he looks white. He discussed how he and other Jewish gamers felt that B.J. was Jewish, stating speculation that it would make sense for his ethnicity to be concealed. He commended Machine Games for making his ethnicity canon, he noted that a common argument against B.J. being Jewish is that his appearance was "incompatible [and antithetical] with Jewish stereotypes," and that his upbringing - being an all-American in Texas - felt distinctly un-Jewish. Polygon writer Carli Velocci discussed her heritage as a half-Jewish person, comparing their experience with B.J.'s, stating that like him, they also are not understood to be Jewish. They cited things like their appearance, which was identified as not "Jewish enough," and their Italian-sounding name, though they also mentioned that being half-Jewish caused members of the community to deny their ethnicity. They speculated that B.J. did not have much in the way of Jewish education due to the little evidence of him practicing his faith, as well as him not fitting physical stereotypes of Jewish people. They discussed how B.J.'s "purpose and drive" is derived from his Jewish heritage, and how the recovery of a ring he eventually gives to chester represents B.J. reclaiming his Judaism from Engel.

His role in The New Colossus was discussed, with Rock Paper Shotgun writer Edwin Evans-Thirlwell feeling that his "white heroism risks echoing chauvinism, and how it and toxic social archetypes at large may become instruments of resistance." He discussed how the decapitation and reassembly of B.J. with a new body made him seem like an object, and how his wife's lack of any strong reaction to his "vat-grown Nazi flesh" feels "sinister." Kotaku writer Heather Alexandra commented on how the game focuses on B.J.'s body, citing multiple instances in The New Order where it was viewed as an "Aryan figure," with Alexandra noting that this was also a "model of an ideal video game protagonist." She discussed how the power armor he wears, created by a Jewish organization, is a "manifestation of faith" and a "feat of Jewish ingenuity," but also that it can be "broken and broken. stated that "faith ... cannot last forever in the face of unspeakable oppression." When discussing his new body, she noted how it "fits so well onto a Nazi-crafted model of physical perfection" and looks similar to how he looked before losing his head. However, she added that despite his body being the "Aryan ideal," he uses it to fight oppression, and that "there is a massive difference in their hearts." Paste Magazine writer Dante Douglas similarly discussed the confusion of B.J. as having an Aryan figure in-universe, particularly a scene where Engels does a Rorschach-style test, only for it to mean nothing in the end. He noted how this represented there not being a "right way" to "pass in society," but instead, "Nazi society sees what it wants to see."
