= List of first-person shooter engines =

This is a sortable list of first-person shooter engines.

== 1970s and 1980s ==
Games in this era featured wireframe graphics and flat-shaded objects.

Game engine	First used for	Date	Other first-person shooters
—N/a	Maze	1973	
—N/a	Spasim	1974	
Arsys Software	Plazma Line	1984	Wibarm (1986), Star Cruiser (1988), Star Cruiser 2 (1992)
Freescape	Driller	1987	Dark Side (1988), Total Eclipse (1988), Castle Master (1990), Castle Master II: The Crypt (1990), Total Eclipse II: The Sphinx Jinx (1991)
—N/a	The Colony	1988	

== Early 1990s ==
Games in this era featured 2.5D environments, character sprites, and surfaces with image textures.

Game engine	First used for	Date	Other first-person shooters
	The Super Spy	1990	
proto-Wolfenstein 3D engine	Hovertank 3D	1990	
proto-Wolfenstein 3D engine	Catacomb 3D	1991	
—N/a	Gunbuster	1992	
Wolfenstein 3D engine	Wolfenstein 3D	1992	Spear of Destiny (1992), Blake Stone: Aliens of Gold (1993), Operation Body Count (1994), Corridor 7: Alien Invasion (1994), Blake Stone: Planet Strike (1994), Rise of the Triad (1994), Super Noah's Ark 3D (1994)
Underworld Engine	Ultima Underworld	1992	
KenTech	Ken's Labyrinth	1993	
Pie in the Sky	Lethal Tender	1993	Terminal Terror (1994), Pencil Whipped (2000), various others (1994–1998)
Doom engine	Doom	1993	Doom II: Hell on Earth (1994), Heretic (1994), The Ultimate Doom (1995), Hexen: Beyond Heretic (1995), Master Levels for Doom II (1995), Hexen: Deathkings of the Dark Citadel (1996), Heretic: Shadow of the Serpent Riders (1996), Strife: Quest for the Sigil (1996), Final Doom (1996), Chex Quest (1996), Chex Quest 2: Flemoids Take Chextropolis (1997), Doom 64 (1997)
Aleph Zero	Marathon	1994	
Build Engine	Legend of the Seven Paladins	1994	Witchaven (1995), William Shatner's TekWar (1995), Duke Nukem 3D (1996), Witchaven II: Blood Vengeance (1996), Duke Nukem 3D: Atomic Edition (1996), PowerSlave (1996, PC version), Redneck Rampage (1997), Blood (1997), Shadow Warrior (1997), Redneck Rampage: Suckin' Grits on Route 66 (1998), Redneck Rampage Rides Again (1998), NAM (1998), Extreme Paintbrawl (1998), World War II GI (1999), Ion Fury (2019)
Aleph One	Marathon 2: Durandal	1995	Marathon Infinity (1996), Prime Target (1996), ZPC (1996), Damage Incorporated (1997)
Jedi Engine	Star Wars: Dark Forces	1995	Outlaws (1997)
Gloom	Gloom	1995	Gloom 2, Gloom 3, Gloom mods (1995–2015)
BreedTech	Alien Breed 3D	1995	
BreedTech 2	Alien Breed 3D II: The Killing Grounds	1996	
—N/a	Assassin 2015	1996	Goosebumps: Attack of the Mutant (1997)
—N/a	Chasm: The Rift	1997	

== Mid 1990s ==
This was the era in which engines began to use true 3D environments and 3D graphics hardware acceleration (3dfx, glide and NVIDIA). Other features include texture mapping and polygons, with characters rendered in 3D polygons rather than 2D sprites.

Game engine	First used for	Date	Other first-person shooters
—N/a	Geograph Seal	1994	
System Shock Engine	System Shock	1994	
—N/a	Descent	1995	Descent II (1996)
RenderWare 1.x	CyberStreet (Tech Demo)	1994	
RenderWare 2.x	Active Worlds	1995	
XnGine	The Terminator: Future Shock	1995	The Terminator: SkyNET (1996)
Quake engine	Quake	1996	Hexen II (1997), Malice (1997), X-Men: The Ravages of Apocalypse (1997), Quake II (1999, N64 Only), Laser Arena (2000), Wrath: Aeon of Ruin (2019)
SlaveDriver	PowerSlave (Saturn)	1996	Quake (1997, Saturn), Duke Nukem 3D (1997, Saturn)
TEngine (Turok Engine)	Turok: Dinosaur Hunter	1997	Turok 2: Seeds of Evil (1998), South Park (1998), Turok: Rage Wars (1999), Armorines: Project S.W.A.R.M. (1999), Turok 3: Shadow of Oblivion (2000)
RareWare Engine	GoldenEye 007	1997	Perfect Dark (2000)
Sith engine	Star Wars Jedi Knight: Dark Forces II	1997	

== Late 1990s ==
This era saw the introduction of 32-bit color, the transition to skeletal animation from per-vertex animation, and the fixed-function pipeline.

Game engine	First used for	Date	Other first-person shooters
Quake II Engine	Quake II	1997	Heretic II (1998), SiN (1998), Kingpin: Life of Crime (1999), Soldier of Fortune (2000), Daikatana (2000)
NetImmerse	Spellbinder: The Nexus Conflict (1999)	1997	The Elder Scrolls III: Morrowind (2002)
Unreal Engine 1	Unreal	1998	Star Trek: The Next Generation: Klingon Honor Guard (1998), TNN Outdoors Pro Hunter (1998), Unreal Tournament (1999), Deus Ex (2000), Clive Barker's Undying (2001), Duke Nukem Forever (2011), Duke Nukem Forever: Restoration Project
Red Storm Engine	Tom Clancy's Rainbow Six (video game)	1998	Rainbow Six: Eagle Watch (1999 expansion) Tom Clancy's Rainbow Six: Rogue Spear (1999), Rogue Spear expansions: Urban Operations (2000),Covert Ops Essentials (2000), and Black Thorn (2001)
LithTech (1.x, 2.x and Talon branches)	Shogo: Mobile Armor Division	1998	Original LithTech 1.0 engine (1998): Blood II: The Chosen (1998). LithTech 1.x revisions (1999–2000): TNN Outdoors Pro Hunter 2 (1999; first-person hunting simulator), KISS: Psycho Circus – The Nightmare Child (2000; modified LithTech 1.5 engine). LithTech 2.x (2000): The Operative: No One Lives Forever (2000), Vietnam: Black Ops (2000), Legends of Might and Magic (2001), Vietnam 2: Special Assignment (2001), Die Hard: Nakatomi Plaza (2002). Modified LithTech 2.x branch: Global Operations (2002; extensively modified engine with rendering and networking improvements). LithTech Talon branch (2001): Elite Forces: WWII – Normandy (2001), Aliens versus Predator 2 (2001), Purge (2003), Western Outlaw: Wanted Dead or Alive (2003). Talon was developed from the No One Lives Forever engine, with enhanced lighting, physics, collision detection and multiplayer systems.
—N/a	Trespasser	1998	
GoldSrc (Modified Quake Engine)	Half-Life	1998	Counter-Strike (2000), Gunman Chronicles (2000), James Bond 007: Nightfire (2002, PC version), Day of Defeat (2003), Counter-Strike: Condition Zero (2004)
Dark Engine	Thief: The Dark Project	1998	System Shock 2 (1999), Thief II: The Metal Age (2000)
AtmosFear	Carnivores (video game)	1998	Carnivores 2 (1999)
Darkstar	Starsiege: Tribes	1998	
—N/a	Redline (1999 video game)	1999	
E.A.T. Engine	Requiem: Avenging Angel	1999	
Asura	Alien Vs. Predator	1999	Judge Dredd: Dredd vs. Death (2003)
Fusion	Descent 3 (1999)	1999	
Insanity 3D	Hidden & Dangerous	1999	
IC	Mortyr 2093 - 1944	1999	
Hammerhead Studios Engine	Quake II (PlayStation Only)	1999	
—N/a	Tom Clancy's Rainbow Six (PlayStation)	1999	Tom Clancy's Rainbow Six: Lone Wolf (PS1), Delta Force: Urban Warfare (2002)
—N/a	Medal of Honor (1999 video game)	1999	Medal of Honor: Underground (2000)
Refractor	Codename: Eagle	1999	Riding Champion: Legacy of Rosemond Hill (2000)
Phoenix VR	Dracula: The Resurrection	1999	
—N/a	SWAT 3: Close Quarters Battle	1999	
Eurocom (007: TWINE)	007: The World Is Not Enough	2000	

== Early 2000s ==
This era saw the end of software rendered graphics as the default technology used to render 3D game engines; GPUs were now a standard feature of computer hardware. Other innovations included skeletal animation, baked lightmaps/dynamic lighting, early programmable shaders, Single-Threaded CPUs, and Real-Time physics.

Game engine	First used for	Date	Other first-person shooters
id Tech 3 (Quake III Arena engine)	Quake III Arena	1999	Original id Software engine (1999): Quake III: Team Arena (2000), Quake Live (2010). Raven Software – Elite Force branch (2000): Star Trek: Voyager – Elite Force (2000); modified Quake III engine with additional single-player, animation and scripting systems). Ritual Entertainment – ÜberTools-derived engine (2000): James Bond 007: Agent Under Fire (2001), Medal of Honor: Allied Assault (2002; Spearhead expansion, 2002; Breakthrough expansion, 2003), Star Trek: Elite Force II (2003). The engine family originated with Ritual's modifications for Heavy Metal: F.A.K.K.² (2000). Return to Castle Wolfenstein branch (2001): Return to Castle Wolfenstein (2001), Wolfenstein: Enemy Territory (2003; standalone multiplayer derivative). Raven Software – Quake III Arena 1.17-derived branch (2000–2003): Soldier of Fortune II: Double Helix (2002; developed from an initial Quake III Arena 1.17 codebase, with Quake III: Team Arena technology and Raven's proprietary GHOUL2 animation and other engine enhancements), Star Wars Jedi Knight II: Jedi Outcast (2002), Star Wars Jedi Knight: Jedi Academy (2003); Call of Duty branch (2002-2003): Call of Duty (2003; extensive evolution of Return to Castle Wolfenstein engine), Call of Duty: United Offensive (2004). Community modifications and open-source descendants (2000 onward): Urban Terror (2000 mod; 2007 standalone), Tremulous (2005 mod; 2006 standalone), OpenArena (2005 onward), World of Padman (2007 standalone). Several standalone projects used derivatives of the ioquake3 engine, developed following the 2005 release of the Quake III source code.
Zero	Battlezone II: Combat Commander	1999	Star Wars: The Clone Wars (2002), Star Wars: Battlefront (2004), Star Wars: Battlefront II (2005)
Ptero Engine	Flying Heroes	2000	Vietcong (2003), Vietcong 2 (2005)
Phoenix3D	The Messenger (2000 video game)	2000	Iron Storm (2002), Inquisition (2002)
RenderWare 3.x	RoboCop (2003 video game)	2000	Call of Duty: Finest Hour (2004), Cold Winter (2005), Battlefield 2: Modern Combat (2005), Black (2006)
—N/a	TimeSplitters (video game)	2000	TimeSplitters 2 (2002), TimeSplitters: Future Perfect (2005)
—N/a	Project I.G.I.	2000	I.G.I. 2 - Covert Strike (2003)
Serious Engine	Serious Sam: The First Encounter	2001	Serious Sam: The Second Encounter (2002)
Torque Game Engine	Tribes 2 (2001)	2001	Desert Gunner (2006)
Geo-Mod	Descent 4 (Cancelled)	1998/2001	Red Faction (2001), Red Faction II (2002)
Real Virtuality	Operation Flashpoint: Cold War Crisis	2001	VBS1 (2002), ArmA: Armed Assault (2007), ARMA II (2009)
Cube Engine	Cube	2001	AssaultCube (2008)
Chrome Engine 1	Survival: The Ultimate Challenge	2001	Chrome (2003), Chrome SpecForce (2005), Terrorist Takedown: Covert Operations (2006), Terrorist Takedown: War in Colombia (2006)
Blam Engine	Halo: Combat Evolved	2001	Halo 2 (2004), Stubbs the Zombie (2005)
—N/a	Secret Service: In Harm's Way	2001	
SAGE	Command & Conquer: Renegade	2002	
AMP Engine	Gore: Ultimate Soldier	2002	Secret Service 2: Security Breach (2003)
Unreal Engine 2	America's Army	2002	Unreal Tournament 2003 (2002) Unreal II: The Awakening (2003), Tom Clancy's Rainbow Six 3: Raven Shield (2003), Devastation (2003), Postal 2 (2003), Deus Ex: Invisible War (2003), Thief: Deadly Shadows (2004), Unreal Tournament 2004 (2004), Tom Clancy's Ghost Recon Advanced Warfighter (2006, Xbox only), Killing Floor (2009)
—N/a	Turok: Evolution	2002	
Refractor 2	Battlefield 1942	2002	Battlefield Vietnam (2004), Battlefield 2 (2005), Battlefield 2142 (2006)
Lithtech Jupiter	No One Lives Forever 2: A Spy in H.A.R.M.'s Way	2002	Tron 2.0 (2003), Contract J.A.C.K. (2003), Combat Arms (2008)
Eurocom Engine (007: Nightfire)	James Bond 007: Nightfire (Console Only)	2002	
Treyarch NGL	Spider-Man	2002	Call of Duty 2: Big Red One (2005), Call of Duty 3 (PlayStation 2/Xbox Only)
LS3D engine	Hidden & Dangerous 2	2002	Mafia (2002)
JADE Engine	Beyond Good & Evil	2003	Peter Jackson's King Kong: The Official Game Of The Movie (PlayStation 2/GameCube/PSP/Xbox)
Gamebryo	Call of Cthulhu: Dark Corners of the Earth (2005)	2003	BlackShot (2008), Fallout 3 (2008), Fallout New Vegas (2010)
—N/a	Breakdown (Xbox)	2004	
Argon	Mortyr 2: For Ever	2004	
—N/a	Killzone	2004	
—N/a	Project Snowblind	2005	
Entropy Engine	Area 51 (2005 video game)	2005	—N/a
Red Storm Engine 2.0	Tom Clancy's Rainbow Six: Lockdown	2005	
Serious Engine 2	Serious Sam II (Xbox)	2005	
—N/a	Tom Clancy's Rainbow Six: Critical Hour	2006	
—N/a	Urban Chaos: Riot Response	2006	

== Mid 2000s ==
Innovations of this era include dynamic per-pixel lighting, High Dynamic Range (HDR) lighting, global illumination, multi-threaded CPUs, advanced physics, and a fully programmable shader implementation/pipeline.

Game engine	First used for	Date	Other first-person shooters
Diesel	Ballistics	2001	Tom Clancy's Ghost Recon Advanced Warfighter (2006, PC version only), Tom Clancy's Ghost Recon Advanced Warfighter 2 (2007, PC version only), Payday: The Heist (2011), Payday 2 (2013), Raid: World War II (2017)
CryEngine	Far Cry	2004	Far Cry Instincts (2005), Far Cry Instincts: Evolution (2006), Far Cry Instincts: Predator (2006), Far Cry Vengeance (2006)
Starbreeze Engine	The Chronicles Of Riddick: Escape from Butcher Bay	2004	The Darkness (2007), The Chronicles of Riddick: Assault on Dark Athena (2009), Syndicate (2012)
Cube 2 Engine	Cube 2: Sauerbraten	2004	Red Eclipse (2011)
id Tech 4	Doom 3	2004	Quake 4 (2005), Prey (2006), Enemy Territory: Quake Wars (2007), Wolfenstein (2009), Brink (2011)
Unreal Engine 2.5	Tribes: Vengeance	2004	SWAT 4 (2005), Bioshock (2007), Bioshock 2 (2010)
Source	Counter-Strike: Source	2004	Half-Life 2 (2004), Vampire: The Masquerade – Bloodlines (2004), Half-Life 2: Deathmatch (2004), Half-Life: Source (2004), Half-Life 2 (Xbox Port), Day of Defeat: Source (2005), Half-Life 2: Lost Coast (2005), Half-Life Deathmatch: Source (2006), Half-Life 2: Episode One (2006), Sin Episodes: Emergence (2006), The Ship (2006), Kuma\War (2006)
id Tech 3.5 (MOHPA Branch)	Medal Of Honor: Pacific Assault	2004	
Chrome Engine 2	Xpand Rally	2004	Code of Honor: The French Foreign Legion (2007), Battlestrike: Force of Resistance (2007), The Hell in Vietnam (2007), Sniper: Art of Victory (2007)
Lithtech Jupiter EX	F.E.A.R.	2005	Condemned 2: Bloodshot (2008), F.E.A.R. 2: Project Origin (2009)
Kt Engine	Bet on Soldier: Blood Sport	2005	Bet on Soldier: Blood of Sahara (2006), Bet on Soldier: Black-out Saigon (2007), Speedball 2: Tournament (2007)
IW engine	Call of Duty 2	2005	Call of Duty 4: Modern Warfare (2007), Call of Duty: World at War (2008), 007: Quantum of Solace (2008), Call of Duty: Modern Warfare 2 (2009), Call of Duty: Black Ops (2010), Call of Duty: Modern Warfare 3 (2011), Call of Duty: Black Ops II (2012), Call of Duty: Ghosts (2013), Call of Duty: Black Ops III (2015), Call of Duty: Infinite Warfare (2016), Call of Duty: Black Ops 4 (2018), Call of Duty: Modern Warfare (2019), Call of Duty: Black Ops Cold War (2020), Call of Duty: Vanguard (2021), Call of Duty: Modern Warfare II (2022), Call of Duty: Modern Warfare III (2023), Call of Duty: Black Ops 6 (2024), Call of Duty: Black Ops 7 (2025), Call of Duty: Modern Warfare 4 (2026)
Unity	GooBall	2005	Deus Ex: The Fall (2013), Interstellar Marines (2013),Dead Effect (2013), Superhot (2016), DUSK (2018), Escape from Tarkov (2025), ULTRAKILL (Early Access)
Treyarch NGL (COD 3)	Call Of Duty 3 (Xbox 360/PlayStation 3)	2006	
Chrome Engine 3	Call of Juarez	2006	
Unreal Engine 3	Gears Of War	2006	Tom Clancy's Rainbow Six: Vegas (2006), Medal of Honor: Airborne (2007), Unreal Tournament 3 (2007), BlackSite: Area 51 (2007), Turok (2008), Brothers in Arms: Hell's Highway (2008), Borderlands (2009), Medal of Honor (2010. singleplayer only), Singularity (2010)
—N/a	Resistance: Fall Of Man	2006	Resistance 2 (2008)
X-Ray Engine	S.T.A.L.K.E.R.: Shadow of Chernobyl	2007	S.T.A.L.K.E.R.: Clear Sky (2008), S.T.A.L.K.E.R.: Call of Pripyat (2009)
Blam Engine (Halo 3)	Halo 3	2007	Halo 3: ODST (2009)

== Late 2000s to 2010s ==
This era saw the introduction of widescreen resolutions, high-resolution textures, and unified shader models.

Game engine	First used for	Date	Other first-person shooters
Source 2007 (The Orange Box branch)	Half-Life 2: Episode Two	2007	Team Fortress 2 (2007), Dystopia (2007), Left 4 Dead (2008), Left 4 Dead 2 (2009), Zeno Clash (2009), NeoTokyo (2009), Bloody Good Time (2010), No More Room in Hell (2011), Nuclear Dawn (2011), Counter-Strike: Global Offensive (2012), Consortium (2014), Fistful of Frags (2014), Day of Infamy (2017), Black Mesa (2020), G String (2020)
CryEngine 2	Crysis	2007	Crysis Warhead (2008), Entropia Universe (2009)
Evolution	Dark Sector	2008	The Darkness II (2012)
Dunia Engine	Far Cry 2	2008	
Frostbite Engine	Battlefield: Bad Company	2008	Battlefield 1943 (2009), Battlefield: Bad Company 2 (2010), Medal of Honor (2010, multiplayer only), Battlefield 3 (2011), Battlefield 4 (2013), Battlefield Hardline (2015), Star Wars Battlefront (2015), Battlefield 1 (2016), Star Wars Battlefront II (2017), Battlefield V (2018), Star Wars: Squadrons (2020), Battlefield 2042 (2021), Battlefield 6 (2025)
—N/a	Killzone 2	2009	Killzone 3 (2011)
EGO engine	Operation Flashpoint 2: Dragon Rising	2009	
Real Virtuality 3	ArmA 2	2009	
Chrome Engine 4	Call of Juarez: Bound in Blood	2009	Sniper: Ghost Warrior (2010)
Serious Engine 3/3.5	Serious Sam HD: The First Encounter	2009	Serious Sam HD: The Second Encounter (2009), Serious Sam 3: BFE (2011)
Blam Engine (Halo Reach)	Halo: Reach	2010	Halo 4 (2012), Halo 5: Guardians (2015)
id Tech 5	Rage	2011	Wolfenstein: The New Order (2014), Wolfenstein: The Old Blood (2015)
Unreal Engine 3.5	Batman: Arkham City	2011	Tribes: Ascend (2012), Borderlands 2 (2012), Aliens: Colonial Marines (2013), BioShock Infinite (2013), Borderlands: The Pre-Sequel (2014), Killing Floor 2 (2016)
Chrome Engine 5	Dead Island	2011	Call of Juarez: The Cartel (2011), Dead Island: Riptide (2013), Call of Juarez: Gunslinger (2013)
CryEngine 3	Crysis 2	2011	Crysis (2011, console versions), Crysis 3 (2013), Warface (2013), Enemy Front (2014)
Vision Engine 8	7554	2011	
Creation Engine	The Elder Scrolls V: Skyrim	2011	Fallout 4 (2015), Fallout 76 (2018)
Dunia 2	Far Cry 3	2012	Far Cry 3: Blood Dragon (2013), Far Cry 4 (2014), Far Cry Primal (2016), Far Cry 5 (2018), Far Cry 6 (2021)
id Tech 4.5 (Includes some features from id Tech 5)	Doom 3: BFG Edition	2012	
Real Virtuality 4	ArmA 3	2013	
Decima	Killzone: Shadow Fall	2013	RIGS: Mechanized Combat League (2016)
Rockstar Advanced Game Engine (GTA V)	Grand Theft Auto V (PS4/Xbox One)	2013	Red Dead Redemption II (2018)
Source (Respawn Entertainment branch)	Titanfall	2014	Titanfall 2 (2016), Apex Legends (2019)
Tiger Engine	Destiny	2014	Destiny 2 (2017)
Sledgehammer Games Engine	Call of Duty: Advanced Warfare	2014	Call of Duty: Modern Warfare Remastered (2016), Call of Duty: WWII (2017), Call of Duty: Modern Warfare 2 Campaign Remastered (2020)
Unreal Engine 4	Space Hulk: Deathwing	2014	LawBreakers (2017), Hypercharge: Unboxed (2017), Insurgency: Sandstorm (2018), Borderlands 3 (2019), Bright Memory (2019), Descent (2019), Postal 4 (2019), Squad (2020), Tiny Tina's Wonderlands (2022), Atomic Heart (2023), Payday 3 (2023) Delta Force (2025, multiplayer)
Chrome Engine 6	Dying Light	2015	
CryEngine 4	Evolve	2015	Homefront: The Revolution (2016), Prey (2017)
id Tech 6	Doom	2016	Wolfenstein II: The New Colossus (2017), Wolfenstein: Youngblood (2019), Wolfenstein: Cyberpilot (2019)
Dawn Engine	Deus Ex: Mankind Divided	2016	
CryEngine V	Hunt: Showdown (2018)	2016	Crysis Remastered (2020)

== 2020s ==
The 2020s has seen support for 8K resolutions and real-time ray-tracing.

Game engine	First used for	Date	Other first-person shooters
id Tech 7	Doom Eternal	2020	Indiana Jones and the Great Circle (2024)
Source 2 (HL:A Branch)	Half-Life: Alyx (2020)	2020	Counter-Strike 2 (2023)
Slipspace	Halo Infinite	2021	
Enfusion	Arma Reforger	2022	Arma 4 (Upcoming)
Unreal Engine 5	Immortals of Aveum (2023)	2022	RoboCop: Rogue City (2023), The Finals (2023), Concord (2024), S.T.A.L.K.E.R. 2: Heart of Chernobyl (2024), Delta Force (2025, singleplayer), Squad (2020, updated to UE5 from UE4 in 2025), Borderlands 4 (2025), Halo: Campaign Evolved (2026), Bodycam (Upcoming) Tomb Raider: Legacy of Atlantis (2027) Tomb Raider: Catalyst (2028)
id Tech 8	Doom: The Dark Ages	2025	
CryEngine 6	TBA	TBA	

== See also ==
- List of free first-person shooters
- List of game engines
- First-person shooter engine
