= Id Tech =

Series of video game engines

Quake family tree, showing engines and a selection of games based on the Quake engine

id Tech is a series of successive game engines designed and developed by id Software. They are used in many of id Software's games, such as games in the Doom, Quake and Wolfenstein franchises, and has been also licensed to other developers. Several notable game engines, such as GoldSrc or the IW engine originate from id Tech code.

Earlier game engines up to id Tech 4 have been released as free software under the GNU General Public License (GPL-2.0-or-later until 2005, GPL-3.0-or-later until 2012). id Tech 5 to 8 remain proprietary, with id Tech 8 currently being the latest engine.

According to Eurogamer.net, "id Software has been synonymous with PC game engines since the concept of a detached game engine was first popularised." However, id Tech 4 had far fewer licensees than Unreal Engine from Epic Games. id planned to regain the momentum with id Tech 5, until the company was bought by ZeniMax Media in 2009 (who was later bought by Microsoft in 2021), with both companies choosing to keep the id Tech engines exclusively for id and its sister studios as a proprietary engine.

== Naming ==
Prior to the reveal of id Tech 5 at WWDC 2007, the engines were simply referred to by the names of the games the engines had been developed for. The Quake II, Quake III Arena and Doom 3 engines were retroactively renamed to id Tech 2, 3 and 4, respectively.

"id Tech 1" was not used as an official name for any engines. The name "id Tech 2" might refer to its direct predecessor, the Quake engine being the first in a line of succession. However, according to a 2007 FiringSquad article, then-CEO Todd Hollenshead considered the Doom engine as "id Tech 1", with the Quake and Quake II engines sharing the "id Tech 2" name.

id Software's licensing site didn't feature an "id Tech 1", only id Tech 2 for Quake II. Before the introduction of the brand in 2007, the licensing page only featured the three Quake engines.

== Predecessors ==
id Software had developed pseudo-3D engines for several games before Quake. Each engine had progressively more advanced pseudo-3D technology. Two notable examples are the Wolfenstein 3D engine and the Doom engine. All of the following are fundamentally different in architecture and rendering technology from later id Software game engines, which are fully 3D rendered with separated engine and game code.

- Hovertank 3D (1991) used solid-color drawn polygonal walls and scalable sprites. The source code was released by Flat Rock Software in June 2014 under GPL-2.0-or-later.
- Catacomb 3-D (1991) added texture mapping to the walls. The source code was released by Flat Rock Software in June 2014 under GPL-2.0-or-later.

=== Wolfenstein 3D engine ===
Wolfenstein 3D (1992) increased the color palette from 16-color EGA to 256-color VGA and also adopted raycasting. The game engine was also licensed out to other companies. The source code to Wolfenstein 3D, along with its prequel Spear of Destiny, was released on 21 July 1995 under a proprietary license, and then later under GPL-2.0-or-later.

ShadowCaster (1993) was built upon the Wolfenstein 3D engine and was licensed out to Raven Software. It features diminished lighting, texture mapped floors and ceilings, walls with variable heights, and sloped floors. This Raven engine was later also used by In Pursuit of Greed, and with further modifications for CyClones as the STEAM engine.

Rise of the Triad uses an enhanced engine of Wolfenstein 3D and was originally meant to serve as the sequel to it. The source code was released on 20 December 2002 under GPL-2.0-or-later.

Other games using this engine are: Blake Stone: Aliens of Gold, Blake Stone: Planet Strike, Corridor 7: Alien Invasion, and Operation Body Count.

=== Doom engine ===
The "Doom engine" powers the id Software games Doom (1993), Doom II: Hell on Earth (1994) and Doom 64 (1997). It was created by John Carmack, with auxiliary functions written by John Romero, Dave Taylor, and Paul Radek. Initially developed on NeXT computers, it was ported to MS-DOS for Doom's release and was later ported to several game consoles and operating systems. The source code was released on 23 December 1997 under a proprietary license, and then later on 3 October 1999 under GPL-2.0-or-later.

Heretic and Hexen: Beyond Heretic were developed by Raven Software and published by id Software. Their sources were released on 4 September 2008 under GPL-2.0-only. Other games using this engine include Strife: Quest for the Sigil and Chex Quest.

== Development ==
Release timeline
1996	Quake engine
1997	id Tech 2
1998
1999	id Tech 3
2000–2003
2004	id Tech 4
2005–2010
2011	id Tech 5
2012–2015
2016	id Tech 6
2017–2019
2020	id Tech 7
2021–2024
2025	id Tech 8

=== Quake engine ===
It was originally written to power 1996's Quake. It featured true 3D real-time graphics via software rendering and is the first id Software engine to use the client–server model and a virtual machine for game code written in QuakeC. 3D model animations lack interpolation, appearing choppy and uneven. The source code was released on 21 December 1999 under GPL-2.0-or-later.

The Quake engine was updated with a new multiplayer-only executable titled QuakeWorld that contained code to enhance the networking capabilities of Quake in response to the demand for across-internet network games that arose as a result of Quake's usage of UDP for networking.

Another update was GLQuake and GLQuakeWorld which add support for 3D acceleration through OpenGL. However, both have limitations which include a lack of "fullbright" and "overbright" lighting present in the software renderer.

=== id Tech 2 ===
Originally known as the "Quake II engine", it was used to power id Software's Quake II in 1997, with features such as out-of-the-box support for hardware acceleration, enhanced network code, colored lighting, and a new vertex-interpolated MD2 model format. id Tech 2 also features alpha blending, radiosity lightmaps, and a modular architecture for the renderer and game code, both now written in C and compiled to shared libraries. The benefits of such are speed and easier debugging at the expense of portability. id Tech 2 is the last id Tech engine to include a software renderer. The source code was released on 22 December 2001 under GPL-2.0-or-later.

=== id Tech 3 ===
Originally known as the "Quake III Arena engine", it was used to power id Software's Quake III Arena in 1999. It is the first in this series to require an OpenGL-compliant graphics accelerator to run. id Tech 3 features higher precision vertex animation with the MD3 model format, volumetric fog, spline-based curved surfaces, precomputed form of portals similar to what is in Prey (2006 video game), decals, and material scripts. The Quake III Arena engine was updated to patch 1.26 and later versions are called "Quake III Team Arena engine" with a new MD4 skeletal model format and huge outdoor areas. The source code was released on 19 August 2005 under GPL-2.0-or-later.

id Tech 3 was updated with the 2001 release of Return to Castle Wolfenstein, which included a single-player scripting system, and the 2003 release of Wolfenstein: Enemy Territory. The source code was released on 12 August 2010 under GPL-3.0-or-later.

It was also licensed by Infinity Ward and modified for the first Call of Duty title in 2003, spawning the IW engine.

=== id Tech 4 ===
Originally known as the "Doom 3 engine", which was used to power Doom 3 as it released in 2004, id Tech 4 began as an enhancement to id Tech 3. During development, it was initially just a complete rewrite of the engine's renderer, while still retaining other subsystems, such as file access, and memory management. The decision to switch from C to the C++ programming language necessitated a restructuring and rewrite of the rest of the engine; today, while id Tech 4 contains code from id Tech 3, much of it has been rewritten. It features unified lighting, shadow volumes, shaders, normal mapping, specular mapping, the improved MD5 skeletal model format, interactive GUI rendered onto model surfaces, and real-time physics simulation. The source code was released on 22 November 2011 under GPL-3.0-or-later.

Other games using this engine are: Raven Software's Quake 4 (2005) and Wolfenstein (2009), Human Head Studios' Prey (2006), Splash Damage's Enemy Territory: Quake Wars (2007) and Brink (2011).

id Tech 4 was updated with the 2012 release of Doom 3: BFG Edition with some features from id Tech 5. The source code was released on 26 November 2012 under GPL-3.0-or-later, and it is the last GPL licensed id Software release.

=== id Tech 5 ===
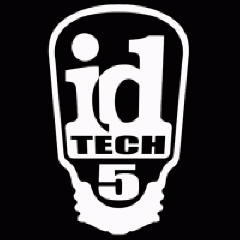
id Tech 5 was the first id Tech engine to receive its own logo.

Used for id Software's Rage, the engine is based on the file system frameworks. Some technologies included are the GUI system from id Tech 4, including a new renderer, MegaTexture 2.0 technology, soft shadows and more.

The engine was later used to power MachineGames' first two Wolfenstein titles, The New Order in 2014 and its standalone expansion The Old Blood, from 2015. It was also used for Tango Gameworks' The Evil Within (2014).

id Tech 5 can no longer be licensed and is now proprietary to id's parent company, Bethesda Softworks. It is the oldest id Software engine not to be released under the GNU GPL license. According to then-CEO of id Software, Todd Hollenshead, the engine remains closed-source because it is a "competitive advantage and we want to keep it within games we publish -- not necessarily exclusively to id or id titles, but if you're going to make a game with id Tech 5 then it needs to be published by Bethesda, which I think is a fair thing."

=== id Tech 6 ===
Used for Doom released on May 13, 2016. While the engine uses some of the features from id Tech 5, id has also added support for Vulkan rendering. Development of the renderer is led by Tiago Sousa, who had previously worked on CryEngine, following previous technical director John Carmack's resignation in 2013. id Tech 6 was also used in Wolfenstein II: The New Colossus (2017), and Wolfenstein: Youngblood (2019) again by MachineGames. It was not used for Quake Champions however, which combined id Tech features with the Saber3D Engine.

=== id Tech 7 ===
At QuakeCon 2018, id Software announced the release of a new game in the Doom franchise called Doom Eternal. Powered by the id Tech 7 engine, Doom Eternal was released on March 20, 2020. The new engine is capable of delivering an increase in geometric detail without drops in frame-rate vs. id Tech 6. On PC, id Tech 7 supports Vulkan rendering only.

=== id Tech 8 ===
At Developer_Direct 2025, id Software revealed gameplay details and the PC specifications for Doom: The Dark Ages, which is powered by their id Tech 8 engine and was released on May 15, 2025.

The id Tech 8 engine increases the maximum number of on-screen enemies and supports path tracing and realistic game physics, featuring destructible environments. It is the first generation of id Tech engine that requires dedicated raytracing-enabled hardware, primarily due to the lighting being fully raytraced global illumination.

== Comparison ==
Name (aka)	Primary programming language	Release year	Open sourced?	Game Code Language	Platforms	Notable games	Notes and references
Quake engine	C	1996	1999, GPL-2.0-or-later	QuakeC	MS-DOS, Windows, Linux, macOS	Quake, Hexen II, Wrath: Aeon of Ruin	First true 3D id Tech engine; arbitrary geometry now possible.
id Tech 2 Quake II engine	C	1997	2001, GPL-2.0-or-later	C	Windows, Linux, macOS	Quake II, Heretic II, SiN, Daikatana, Gravity Bone, Thirty Flights of Loving	Colored lights, 3D Acceleration.
id Tech 3 Quake III Arena engine	C	1999	2005, GPL-2.0-or-later	C	Windows, Linux, macOS	Quake III Arena, Heavy Metal: F.A.K.K. 2, American McGee's Alice, Call of Duty, Quake Live	Curved Surfaces, Volumetric Fog, Virtual Machine
id Tech 3 Quake III Arena engine	C	2001	2010, GPL-3.0-or-later	C	Windows, Linux, macOS	Return to Castle Wolfenstein, Wolfenstein: Enemy Territory	Improvements to the id Tech 3 engine.
id Tech 4 Doom 3 engine	C++	2004	2011, GPL-3.0-or-later	C++, custom scripting for GUI elements	Windows, Linux, macOS	Doom 3, Quake 4, Prey, Enemy Territory: Quake Wars, Wolfenstein, Brink, Quadrilateral Cowboy	Among many new features, interactive GUI surfaces and unified lighting with stencil shadows. First id Tech engine to support normal mapping.
id Tech 4 Doom 3 engine	C++	2011	2012, GPL-3.0-or-later	C++, Adobe Flash for GUI elements	Windows, Linux, macOS	Doom 3: BFG Edition	Improvements to the id Tech 4 engine. GUI scripting system replaced with Flash.
id Tech 5	C++	2011	Proprietary	Script	Windows, macOS, Xbox 360, Xbox One, PlayStation 3, PlayStation 4	Rage, Wolfenstein: The New Order, Wolfenstein: The Old Blood, The Evil Within	First id Tech engine to feature MegaTexture technology, starting with Rage
id Tech 6	C++	2016	Proprietary	Unknown	Windows, Xbox One, PlayStation 4, Nintendo Switch	Doom (2016), Wolfenstein II: The New Colossus	
id Tech 7	C++	2020	Proprietary	Unknown	Windows, PlayStation 4, PlayStation 5, Xbox One, Xbox Series X/S, Nintendo Switch, Nintendo Switch 2	Doom Eternal, Indiana Jones and the Great Circle	Much refactoring, MegaTexture removed, many additional new features
id Tech 8	C++	2025	Proprietary	Unknown	Windows, PlayStation 5, Xbox Series X/S	Doom: The Dark Ages	First version of the engine to require hardware-level ray-tracing

== See also ==
- First-person shooter engine
- List of game engines
