= Loki's Minions Capture the Flag =

LMCTF
- Developer: LMCTF development team
- Engine: Quake II
- Platforms: Mac OS, BeOS, Linux, Microsoft Windows
- Release: November 12, 1997 (v1.0c)
- Genre: FPS
- Mode: Multiplayer

Loki's Minions Capture the Flag (LMCTF) was one of the first Quake II mods and the first ever capture the flag mod released for the game. It was created by Mike "Jormungard" Scandizzo of Clan Loki's Minions. The mod was released the day after the Quake II source code was released and soon became very popular. Its defining feature was the use of an off-hand grappling hook, which allowed the player to fly through the air while still being able to fire their weapon.

== Gameplay ==
LMCTF is a Capture the Flag game. There are two teams, Red and Blue. The goal is to enter the other teams base, steal their flag and return it safely to your teams flag inside of your base. The team with the most flag captures at the end of the match wins the game.

== Features ==
LMCTF added many new features to the original Quake 2 game. The off-hand grappling hook, power-up runes (Haste, Strength, Resist and Regeneration), plasma rifle, team radio and voice sounds, custom models, custom skins, custom maps, tournament mode and observer cam options are just a few of the additions.

== History ==
The mod was originally released by Jormungard of Clan LM. After its release, other programmers, modelers and mappers joined the team. At release 3.0 on April 1, 1998, the team included Jormungrad and Surt as lead programmers, and John "Mr. White" Keffer, John "Der Kommissar" Staats and Keith "Vampire" Mercer as lead mappers. Hati joined the team as a programmer for release 4.0 (July 15, 1998), with Dan "Batstone" Markham taking over the role for the 5.0 release when the previous programmers left for work at Blizzard. Der Kommissar later joined them. The mod included many maps from the wider Quake II community in its releases, totaling 30 after the 5.0 release.

There were many tournaments for LMCTF clans, including Ragnarok, Ascension, Narf!, Wargrounds, Online Gaming League (OGL) and the Free Agent Fest, but the biggest was the Ragnarok and Ragnarok 2 tournaments. The Ragnarok was the first community-wide tournament which featured a round-robin regular season followed by a single-elimination playoffs. This tourney started in 1998 with a second season following in 1999. The first-season winner was Harbingers of Despair [HD]. The second season Ragnarok winner was Pathetic Totally Harmless.

In August 2011, a revival started in the U.S. and European LMCTF communities with organized matches and play.

This revival resulted in 6 mini tournaments with as many as 6 teams competing for the 'Beatdown' championship.

In May 2020, another revival started resulting in the continuation of the 'Beatdown' tournament to season 7.

== Maps ==
The mod featured 30 original maps in its final iteration. There were also several community made map pack additions released, including XMaps2, Lockheed's Tombs, Nachos Map Pack and the Kiukku Pack. These map packs added an additional 50 maps to the available selection.
