= Id Tech 7 =

Multiplatform game engine by id Software

id Tech 7
- Developer: id Software
- Written in: C++
- Platform: Microsoft Windows; Nintendo Switch; Nintendo Switch 2; PlayStation 4; PlayStation 5; Xbox One; Xbox Series X/S; Stadia
- Predecessor: id Tech 6
- Successor: id Tech 8
- License: Proprietary
- Website: idsoftware.com

id Tech 7 is a multiplatform proprietary game engine developed by id Software. As part of the id Tech series of game engines, it is the successor to id Tech 6. The software was first demonstrated at QuakeCon 2018 as part of the id Software announcement of Doom Eternal.

Indiana Jones and the Great Circle features a fork of id Tech 7 known as "Motor".

== Technology ==
id Tech 7 features ten times the geometric detail of id Tech 6 and higher texture fidelity. Moreover the capabilities of the game engine allow it to have a new system called "Destructible Demons", in which enemies' bodies become progressively destroyed and deteriorate in combat as they suffer damage. On PC, id Tech 7 supports Vulkan rendering only. Ray tracing and DLSS were added in June 2021. According to engine developer Axel Gneiting, the engine doesn't have a "main thread"; everything is implemented as jobs.

=== Improvements in comparison to id Tech 6 ===
- 1 million fewer lines of code, due in part to the removal of the OpenGL render-engine
- Unified HDR lighting and shadowing
- Full HDR support on PS4, PS4 Pro, PS5, Xbox One S, Xbox One X, Xbox Series S, Xbox Series X, PC and Stadia
- Multi PBR material compositing, blending, and painting
- Increased texture fidelity and geometric detail due to removal of MegaTexture pipeline, used since id Tech 4
- Enhanced global illumination quality
- Greatly improved particle system as more particles are running on the GPU, which allows for bigger explosions, more atmospheric volumetrics and more vibrant particle effects
- The framerate limit has been increased to 1000 FPS. The frame limit was 250 FPS in id Tech 6.
- Rewritten jobs-system to use all available CPU cores more efficiently
- Improved post-processing effects, including more detailed anti-aliasing and enhanced motion blur
- Support for gameplay areas twice the size of those in id Tech 6
- Improved image streaming
- Expanded decal system
- Improved LOD system
- Improved animation system, supporting Alembic animations caching.
- New GPU triangle-, light- and occlusion-culling system to not render what is offscreen
- Dramatically improved compression
- Improved level loading times, including after death screens
- DLSS 2.3.0
- Ray-traced reflections on PlayStation 5, Xbox Series X (not available on Xbox Series S) and PCs with hardware accelerated ray tracing
- Variable rate shading on Xbox Series X and Xbox Series S

== Games using id Tech 7 ==
| Year | Title | Developer | Notes |
|---|---|---|---|
| 2020 | Doom Eternal | id Software | |
| 2024 | Indiana Jones and the Great Circle | MachineGames | Custom version branded as Motor - Powered by id Tech |

== See also ==
- First-person shooter engine
- List of game engines
