= QME =

QME may refer to:

- Quartet on the Middle East
- Qualitative Military Edge
- Quake Model Editor
