= Id Tech 6 =

Video game engine

id Tech 6
- Developer: id Software
- Written in: C++
- Platform: Microsoft Windows; PlayStation 4; Xbox One; Nintendo Switch; Stadia
- Predecessor: id Tech 5
- Successor: id Tech 7
- License: Proprietary
- Website: idsoftware.com

id Tech 6 is a multiplatform game engine developed by id Software. It is the successor to id Tech 5 and was first used to create the 2016 video game Doom. Internally, the development team also used the codename id Tech 666 to refer to the engine. The PC version of the engine is based on the Vulkan API and the OpenGL API.

John Carmack started talking about his vision regarding the engine that would succeed id Tech 5 several years before the latter debuted in Rage, but following his departure from id Software in 2014, Tiago Sousa was hired to replace him as the lead renderer programmer at the company.

On June 24, 2009, id Software was acquired by ZeniMax Media. It was later announced in 2010 that id Software's technology would be available only to other companies also belonging to ZeniMax Media. It was followed up by id Tech 7.

== Preliminary information ==
In 2008 and while id Tech 5 had yet to be fully formed, John Carmack said the next engine by id Software would be looking towards a direction where ray tracing and classic raster graphics would be mixed. The engine would work by raycasting the geometry represented by voxels (instead of triangles) stored in an octree. Carmack claimed that this format would also be a more efficient way to store the 2D data as well as the 3D geometry data, because of not having packing and bordering issues. The goal of the engine would be to virtualize geometry the same way that id Tech 5 virtualized textures. This would be a change from past engines which for the most part use mesh-based systems. However, he also explained during QuakeCon 08, that the hardware that would be capable of id Tech 6 did not yet exist at the time.

In July 2011, Carmack explained that id Software was beginning research for the development of id Tech 6. It's unknown if Carmack's vision of the engine at the time was still the same he described in 2008.

Eventually, the plans for a rendering approach with voxel-based raycasting were abandoned in favor of conventional mesh-based rasterization.

== Technology ==
An early version of the fourth main Doom game was being built on id Tech 5 but id Software restarted development in late 2011 to early 2012, after Bethesda expressed concerns about its creative and technological direction. When development was restarted it was decided to begin with the id Tech 5-based Rage codebase but take "big leaps back in certain areas of tech" and "[merge] Doom features to Rage".

Doom was first shown to the public during QuakeCon 2014, where it was confirmed it was running on an early version of id Tech 6. The developers' goals when creating the engine were described as being able to drive good looking games running at 1080p on 60 fps but also reintroduce real-time dynamic lighting which was largely removed from id Tech 5. The engine still uses virtual textures (dubbed "MegaTextures" in id Tech 4 and 5) but they are of higher quality and no longer restrict the appearance of realtime lighting and shadows. Physically based rendering has also been confirmed. A technical analysis of Doom found that the engine supports motion blur, bokeh depth of field, HDR bloom, shadow mapping, lightmaps, irradiance volumes, image-based lighting, FXAA, volumetric lighting/smoke, destructible environments, water physics, skin sub-surface scattering, SMAA and TSSAA anti-aliasing, directional occlusion, screen space reflections, normal maps, GPU accelerated particles which are correctly lit and shadowed, triple buffer v-sync which acts like fast sync, unified volumetric fog (every light, shadow, indirect lighting affects it, including water caustics / underwater light scattering), tessellated water surface (on the fly without GPU tessellation. Caustics are dynamically generated and derived from water surface), and chromatic aberration. On July 11, 2016, id Software released an update for the game that added support for Vulkan.

Following Carmack's departure from id Software, Tiago Sousa, who had worked as the lead R&D graphics engineer of several versions of the CryEngine at Crytek, was hired to lead development of the rendering. Bethesda's Pete Hines has commented that while id Tech 6 reuses code written by Carmack, most of the decisions made about the engine's direction were taken after he left.

== Games using id Tech 6 ==
Year	Title	Developer
2016	Doom	Id Software
2017	Wolfenstein II: The New Colossus	MachineGames
2017	Doom VFR	id Software
2019	Wolfenstein: Youngblood	MachineGames; Arkane Studios
2019	Wolfenstein: Cyberpilot	MachineGames; Arkane Studios

== See also ==
- First-person shooter engine
- List of game engines
- List of first-person shooter engines
