= Michael Scandizzo =

American businessman

Michael Scandizzo is the president and project lead of Castaway Entertainment, a company formed out of former Blizzard North employees in 2003. He is also responsible for programming on Diablo II, the development of the Battle.net game server network, and the Quake 2 mod Loki's Minions Capture the Flag. He also created the Boat Anchor comic strip: which describes events that mirror the time he would have spent at Blizzard North and the eventual formation of Castaway.
