= Pie in the Sky (game engine) =

1990s video game engine

Pie in the Sky, variously known as the Pie 3D Game Creation System, the Game Creation System, and Power 3D, is a 2.5D and 3D first-person shooter engine and game creation system developed by Pie in the Sky Software in the mid to late 1990s. The engine was used in two games by the company as well as other independent games and amateur projects after it was turned into a commercial game creator, because it minimized the amount of programming needed to make 3D games.

== History ==
Pie in the Sky Software, formed principally by programmer Kevin Stokes, first dabbled in 3D computer graphics by creating a terminate-and-stay-resident 3D screen saver called InnerMission in 1987. When the market for 3D applications started to grow more popular, they developed a 3D flight simulator called Corncob 3D in 1992, later published by MVP Software. In 1993, after seeing Wolfenstein 3D, Stokes wrote a new 3D engine in C and then used it for the first-person shooter Lethal Tender. Based on Lethal Tender, they were hired by a German group to create a German-language first-person shooter. Pie in the Sky released Terminal Terror as a follow-up to Lethal Tender in 1994.

Kevin Stokes and John Nagle used the Pie in the Sky engine to create a game development system for non-programmers. They launched the 3D Game Creation System before Christmas in 1994. It was first used by games such as Red Babe by The DaRK CaVErN Productions and La Cosa Nostra by Slade 3D Software.

In 1995, it was used in the Despair series, Terror in Christmas Town, Deer Napped, and Castaway: The Ordeal Begins as well as the official example games Meltdown and Industrial Killers. Various bugs in the program were fixed in upgrades and patches during this time, partly because of the rushed development of the system in the first place. The contract with the German group changed, and instead the new game creation system was re-released in German as well as English.

Writing in 1996, a Games Domain reviewed the Game Creation system saying, "Overall this could be a good package but at the moment it looks and feels too much like a beta release to warrant heavy use, and certainly when compared to public domain and shareware editors for Doom it shows a great many flaws."

The engine was ported to Windows and Direct X in 1998, as well as updating it beyond Wolfenstein 3D-like standards. With the decline of MS-DOS, the company decided to port to Windows and adopt 3D API technology using the Renderware library. This was first attempted in a racing game called Baja Bash, but emphasis was switched to converting the old game creation engine because of market demands, time constraints, and some criticism of the game. Because of licensing restrictions, however, Pie in the Sky opted to use Direct3D.

The GCS was used for the game Pencil Whipped, designed for the 2000 Independent Games Festival. Chub Gam 3D, an earlier freeware game, was reissued in director's cut form in 1998. In 2001, the third version of the engine was released, featuring true-3D polygonal enemies and weapons, 3D terrain, and other improvements. The engine ceased being sold in May 2003.

In 2010, the company was restarted, and has created a physics engine demo and a dice simulation for the Android mobile operating system.
