= Malice (1997 video game) =

- Developer: Ratloop
- Publishers: Quantum Axcess (PC), R-Comp International (RISC OS)
- Composer: James Anderson
- Engine: Quake engine
- Platforms: MS-DOS, Windows, Linux, Mac OS, RISC OS
- Release: NA: November 14, 1997
- Genre: First-person shooter
- Modes: Single-player, multiplayer

Malice is a total conversion for the first-person shooter video game Quake, developed jointly by Team Epochalypse (which would go on to form Ratloop) and Quantum Axcess, and published by Quantum Axcess in November 1997 as a commercial game. It would later be bundled with both the original Quake and the Q!Zone add-on in the form of the Resurrection Pack for Quake compilation, distributed by GT Interactive in 1998. Malice, not being a stand-alone total conversion, requires the full version of Quake in order to be played.

== Gameplay ==
Being a total conversion of Quake, Malice features a similar gameplay style to that title. The game includes eighteen new levels, fourteen new enemies, various additional items (known as "Toyz" in the game), a new soundtrack, and new weapons. Unlike in Quake, weapons in Malice can be manually reloaded.

== Plot ==
The game is set in the year 2230. The player assumes the role of a bandana-wearing mercenary named Damage. Working for Colonel Bossman and his underground crime syndicate, B.O.S.S., the player is pitted against Bossman's main rival, Takahiro Industries. Takahiro Industries has its own security, too, with an army of guards as well as various sophisticated robots. Damage has to fight these, going through futuristic environments in order to assassinate Takahiro himself.

== Reception ==
Press reactions to Malice were generally high in praise, with the game earning positive reviews. Online publication Adrenaline Vault gave the game 4.5/5 and it won their "Best Addon Award" in 1997. PC Gamer UK gave the game their "Game of Distinction Award" in 1997. PC Zone also praised the game, noting how well Malice differentiated itself from the original Quake and awarded the game 80%. GamesZone praised the environments, and how they reflected real-world settings and not just "an abstract fantasy-techno-horror mixture". They would compare the game favourably to the then recently released Quake II demo, and awarded the game 90%.
