= Wolfenstein: Youngblood =

2019 video game

- Developers: MachineGames; Arkane Lyon
- Publisher: Bethesda Softworks
- Directors: Dinga Bakaba; Jerk Gustafsson
- Producer: Kari Koivistoinen
- Artists: Damien Laurent; Sébastien Mitton; Axel Torvenius
- Writers: Roar Thoresen; Tommy Tordsson
- Composers: Martin Stig Andersen; Tom Salta; Ross Tregenza
- Series: Wolfenstein
- Engine: id Tech 6
- Platforms: Windows; Nintendo Switch; PlayStation 4; Xbox One; Stadia
- Release: Windows; July 25, 2019; Switch, PS4, Xbox One; July 26, 2019; Stadia; November 19, 2019
- Genre: First-person shooter
- Modes: Single-player, multiplayer

Wolfenstein: Youngblood is a 2019 first-person shooter game developed by MachineGames and Arkane Lyon and published by Bethesda Softworks. A spin-off of the Wolfenstein series, the game, set 19 years after 2017's Wolfenstein II: The New Colossus, follows B.J. Blazkowicz's teenage daughters Jessie and Zofia as they search for him in France while uncovering a conspiracy surrounding a Nazi plot to cause a weather apocalypse.

Wolfenstein: Youngblood was released for Windows, Nintendo Switch, PlayStation 4, and Xbox One in July 2019 and Stadia in November 2019 as a launch title. The game received mixed reviews from critics who felt it was a step down from previous installments, although some reviewers praised the combat.

== Gameplay ==
The player assumes control of either Jessie or Sofia Blazkowicz from a first-person perspective; an optional cooperative multiplayer mode is included. Players can complete the game with another player or with an artificial intelligence substitute. Missions can be completed in a non-linear order, and players can unlock new gear and abilities as they progress in the game.

== Plot ==
Nineteen years after Wolfenstein II: The New Colossus, the United States has been liberated from Nazi control and reestablished, while the members of the Kreisau Circle, including B.J. Blazkowicz, his wife Anya, and the late Caroline, are hailed as revolutionary heroes, with some holding positions in the new U.S. federal government. While efforts to liberate the rest of the world from the Nazis largely succeeded, infighting and differing priorities led to the global coalition dissolving, leaving Europe under Nazi control. Blazkowicz and Anya retire to raise their twin daughters Jessie and Zofia, teaching them how to defend themselves.

In 1980, Blazkowicz mysteriously disappears without a trace. Jessie, Zofia, and their friend Abby, daughter of FBI Director Grace Walker, discover a hidden room in the attic with a map indicating Blazkowicz traveled to Nazi-occupied Neu-Paris to meet the French Resistance. Believing American authorities will not follow him, the girls steal an FBI helicopter and a pair of powered armor suits and head for France.

In Neu-Paris, the girls meet Juju, the leader of the Resistance, who confirms that she had met Blazkowicz but has no knowledge of his current location. They learn he is trying to find a way into a secret Nazi installation called Lab X. In order to gain access, the girls decide to help the Resistance hack the main computers of the "Brothers", a trio of security towers that hold the keys to Lab X. Upon reviewing the data in the Brothers' computers, Abby realizes that Juju is a Nazi agent and her partner is General Lothar, the disgraced commander of the Nazi forces in Neu-Paris. The girls pretend to drink Juju's drugged wine, and Lothar gloats that with the Brothers under his control, he can commence his plans to start a Fourth Reich without interference from his superiors in Berlin. A struggle ensues, with Lothar and Juju managing to escape while Abby is stabbed in her eye, leaving the sisters to find Lab X without her.

Abby explains that the Nazi leadership attempted to kill Lothar for disobeying their orders, forcing him into hiding where he eventually infiltrated the French Resistance with Juju. Jessie and Zofia breach Lab X and proceed to its deepest level, where they find Blazkowicz. He tells them that after the Nazis started losing ground following the Second American Revolution, Adolf Hitler ordered the construction of a weather control doomsday device to crush the rising global resistance movement. When BJ killed Hitler in the 1960s, a fail-safe planned by Hitler activated the doomsday device that will eventually render the Earth uninhabitable, as part of Hitler's "Nero Decree" to bring down the world with him. He traveled to Lab X to find a way to stop the doomsday device, where he learned about the existence of multiple alternate dimensions, and glimpsed one where the Nazis lost World War II. He then uses a Da'at Yichud artifact to upgrade Jessie and Zofia's powered armor suits and directs them to go after Lothar. Meanwhile, Lothar retakes his old headquarters and orders his allies in Berlin to stage a coup against the government. Jessie and Zofia confront Juju and Lothar and kill them both.

Afterward, Anya and Grace arrive. Realizing the threat the Fourth Reich poses, the Blazkowicz family, Grace, and the U.S. government call upon the rest of the world to fight the Fourth Reich and defeat the Nazis for good. Jessie, Zofia, and Abby decide to stay in Paris to defend it against the Fourth Reich's counterattack with the Apocalypse looming in the horizon.

== Development ==
Bethesda announced the game at Electronic Entertainment Expo 2018. The title was developed by MachineGames, which led the development of the rebooted Wolfenstein series, and Arkane Studios' office in Lyon, which previously handled the development of the Dishonored series. Initially the game was a narrative adventure focusing on only one of the twins. However, during internal testing and feedback phase, the team expanded the scope of the story to include both twins as the game's duo protagonists and added a cooperative multiplayer mode so that two players can complete the game as the twin sisters together. The game's Deluxe Edition includes a Buddy Pass, which can be gifted to a player who does not own a copy of the game. The Buddy Pass enables that player to download and play the game without buying it, on the condition that they play it in the same game session with the player who grants them the pass. Wolfenstein: Youngblood was released for Windows (via Steam and Bethesda Store), Nintendo Switch, PlayStation 4 and Xbox One on July 26, 2019. The development of the Switch version was outsourced to Panic Button. Although the Nintendo Switch version will have a standard and a Deluxe Edition retail release, no actual physical game card will be included, and a download code will be offered instead.

Wolfenstein: Youngblood and the simultaneously released Wolfenstein: Cyberpilot were the first games to make use of the "social adequacy clause" introduced by Unterhaltungssoftware Selbstkontrolle (USK; the German software ratings board) in August 2018, which allowed the use of Nazi imagery in video games in relevant scenarios, reviewed on a case-by-case basis. Despite being officially rated by USK, major German retailers, such as MediaMarkt, Saturn, and GameStop, refused to sell the uncensored version, offering only the separately sold German version, which lacks all Nazi imagery and references and features German as the only language option.

== Reception ==
Reception

Aggregate score
| Aggregator | Score |
|---|---|
| Metacritic | (NS) 66/100 (PC) 69/100 (PS4) 63/100 (XONE) 68/100 |

Review scores
| Publication | Score |
|---|---|
| Destructoid | 6/10 |
| Game Informer | 8.5/10 |
| GameRevolution | 2.5/5 |
| GameSpot | 8/10 |
| GamesRadar+ | 3/5 |
| IGN | 6.5/10 |
| Nintendo Life | 7/10 |
| Nintendo World Report | 5.5/10 |
| PC Gamer (US) | 79/100 |

Wolfenstein: Youngblood received "mixed or average" reviews, according to review aggregator Metacritic. IGN gave a score of 6.5/10, saying it "doesn't come close to recapturing the joy of its predecessor", while GameSpot gave a score of 8/10 for "challenging combat encounters" and "light RPG elements that spice up the solid gunplay" better than its previous installment. PC Gamer rated the game favorably with a 79/100 score.

=== Sales ===
Wolfenstein: Youngblood became the second-best-selling retail game in the United Kingdom three days after its release behind Fire Emblem: Three Houses. In Japan, approximately 2,740 physical units for PS4 were sold during its launch week, becoming the number 20 selling game of any format.
