= Blake Stone: Aliens of Gold =

1993 video game

- Developer: JAM Productions
- Publisher: Apogee Software
- Composer: Robert Prince
- Engine: Wolfenstein 3D
- Platforms: DOS, Windows, Mac OS, Linux, Amiga
- Release: December 5, 1993
- Genre: First-person shooter
- Mode: Single-player

Blake Stone: Aliens of Gold (also known as Blake Stone 3-D) is a first-person shooter for DOS created by JAM Productions and published by Apogee Software on December 5, 1993. The following year, a sequel called Blake Stone: Planet Strike was released, which continues where Aliens of Gold leaves off. Some copies of the game provided a Command Control Gravis Gamepad.

== Plot ==
The story is set in the year 2140. Robert Wills Stone III, also known as Blake Stone, is an agent of the British Intelligence, recruited after a highly successful career in the British Royal Navy.

His first major case is to investigate and eliminate the threat of Dr. Pyrus Goldfire, a brilliant scientist in the field of genetics and biology, known for his outright disrespect of professional ethics. Backed by his own organization, STAR, Dr. Goldfire plans to conquer Earth and enslave humanity using an army of specially trained human conscripts, modified alien species, and a host of genetically-engineered mutants. Agent Stone is sent on a mission to knock out six crucial STAR installations and destroy Goldfire's army before it can assault the Earth.

== Gameplay ==
Gameplay screenshot

The gameplay of Aliens of Gold is very similar to Wolfenstein 3D. Playable areas are single-leveled, with orthogonal walls and textured floors and ceilings, and have a wide variety of human, mutant and alien enemies – the latter two are sometimes dormant in canisters and on work tables – and frequent encounters and fights with Dr. Goldfire. Level features include locked doors that can be opened by four colors of access cards – gold, green, yellow and blue – plus red access cards to enter new floors; an auto-mapping system; food dispensers that exchange tokens for healing items; friendly interactive Informants who are distinguishable from the Bio-Techs by what they say and give information, ammunition and tokens; one-way doors; secret rooms accessible through pushable wall blocks; and teleporters that instantly take the player into another location within the level, or, in one instance, to one of the episode's secret levels. Five weapons are available, consisting of a silent pistol with infinite ammo, three hitscan guns and a grenade launcher type gun.

In every level the player can boost points for score by destroying all enemies, collecting all points and keeping all Informants alive, which increases the three respective statuses. Total Points is affected by both the enemies destroyed and the treasure collected. The 'all informants alive' bonus can only be obtained if all informants survive after the first two bonuses are obtained. Floor rating is affected by the other three statuses. Mission rating is affected by the overall statuses from floors 1 to 9. Killing Informants decreases both Floor and Mission Rating.

=== Level structure ===
The game consists of six episodes, each with 11 levels – nine regular and two secret. A main elevator goes through levels 1 through 10 and is the only means of moving between the levels. The goal of each level from 1 through 8 is to secure a red keycard and use it to unlock the next floor. The elimination of all enemies and the collection of all treasure on the current floor are optional objectives which provide bonuses upon completion. "Plasma alien" enemies, which spawn repeatedly from electrical outlets, do not count towards the kill ratio. Blake Stone can take the elevator back down to previous levels to find missed items or kill any remaining enemies.

On level 9 of each episode, defeating a stronger version of Dr. Goldfire forces him to drop a gold keycard. The key is used to unlock the way to the boss, which holds another gold keycard for the level's exit – the episode's end. Each episode features two secret levels. One of them, floor 0, can be accessed through a teleport hidden somewhere within the same episode. The other is floor 10, directly accessible through the main elevator. A red keycard is required to enter, and is usually hidden on floor 9. Secret levels do not have special objectives; their only purpose is to boost the player's score.

== Development ==
Blake Stone uses the Wolfenstein 3D game engine. Its working title was "Secret Agent Game". Development was handled by JAM Productions, a startup company consisting of Mike Maynard, Jim Row, and Jerry Jones. Little work on the game was done in-house at publisher/distributor Apogee Software, though Apogee programmer Mark Dochtermann implemented the ceiling textures and Joe Siegler participated in playtesting the game.

Complaints about getting lost in Wolfenstein 3D prompted the creation of an automap feature. The protagonist's name was thought up by Maynard and Row, taking some inspiration from action figure marketing techniques. The maps were created using Tile Editor (TEd), which Apogee had previously used for Wolfenstein 3D. The game took about 18 months of development. The antagonist was named Dr. Goldstern in the initial release, but was changed to Dr. Goldfire in response to a complaint that the game portrayed Jewish people as evil.

== Release ==
The shareware version of the game was released on December 3, 1993. The registered version of Blake Stone shipped with a comic book, called Blake Stone Adventure. id Software released Doom one week after Apogee released Blake Stone. Doom quickly eclipsed Blake Stone, which sold poorly after initial success. Joe Siegler presented the game at COMDEX in Las Vegas.

In 2009, the game was re-released with Windows support on GOG.com, with support for macOS added in 2013 and Linux in 2014 (using DOSbox emulator); a Steam release followed in 2015. Native Linux version of the same (BStone) source port can be built manually. In 2017, the game was ported to Amiga.

== Reception ==
Reception

Review scores
Publication	Score
AllGame	2/5
Hyper	73%
PC Zone	5/5
Electronic Entertainment	8/10

Award
Publication	Award
Software Publishers Association	Codie award

Computer Gaming World reported in March 1994 that while not quite as good as Doom, "Blake Stone is nonetheless a high quality, first person blast-fest". The magazine concluded that the game "delivers the goods on all counts" and was worth the registration fee.

James V. Trunzo reviewed Blake Stone: Aliens of Gold in White Wolf #45 (July, 1994), giving it a final evaluation of "Excellent" and stated that "If you're tired of games that make you spend half your time traveling from one place to another or games that make you talk to dozens of moronic NPCs, Blake Stone: Aliens of Gold will shock you out of your lethargy. It's a great change of pace while still a challenge and a different kind of 'you are there' experience."
