= Blake Stone: Planet Strike =

1994 video game

- Cover art
- Developer: JAM Productions
- Publisher: Apogee Software
- Composer: Robert Prince
- Engine: Wolfenstein 3D
- Platforms: DOS, Windows, Linux, MacOS
- Release: October 28, 1994
- Genre: First-person shooter

Blake Stone: Planet Strike (also Blake Stone 2) is a first-person shooter video game, the sequel to Blake Stone: Aliens of Gold, made by JAM Productions and released for DOS on October 28, 1994, by Apogee Software.

== Plot ==
Following Pyrus Goldfire's escape at the end of Aliens of Gold, British Intelligence initiated a large-scale search to capture him. For many years, no trace of the arch-villain could be found. In 2149, Dr. Goldfire is spotted in an abandoned training facility on the planet Selon, near the former STAR Institute. He is building an army stronger than anything witnessed before, in a second attempt to enslave humanity. Blake Stone is once again sent to stop the villain, with a direct order to find and terminate Dr. Goldfire, so that he would never threaten Earth again.

== Gameplay ==
DOS screenshot

Most of the gameplay is identical to the previous game in the series. In contrast to Aliens of Gold, in which the player has to retrieve the red access card to unlock the next floor in the elevator, the player advances levels in Planet Strike by way of the "Security Cube". The player must first acquire the fission detonator on that level. Then the player must locate the Security Cube itself and drop/arm the detonator. Once the Security Cube is destroyed, Stone can return to the main transporter to access the next level. The game contains one linear campaign of 20 levels and 4 secret levels, instead of six episodes with 54 levels and 12 secret levels as was in Aliens of Gold. There is also a new weapon.

Planet Strike eliminated some features of the auto-map system in order to make navigation more challenging. There is now only a minimap which shows at most 1/8 of a level, and the option of a non-rotating map has been removed. Thus the player must overcome the distortions caused by the map rotation and can potentially get lost when retracing steps to a newly unlocked area. The removal of these features also makes it more difficult to determine possible locations of secret areas. As a tradeoff, the pushable walls leading to secret areas are marked on the minimap, but only when it is at 4X magnification, making its coverage too small to be of use in navigation. Moreover, using the 4X and 2X views (which marks enemies which may be morphing or cloaked) expends magnification power, which must be refilled in a manner similar to ammunition.

== Development ==
The game's working title was "Blake Stone: Firestorm". The developers were limited by memory constraints and programming issues when trying to add additional digitized voices into the game, and ended up playing pre-existing voices from Aliens of Gold backwards. Just like Aliens of Gold and Wolfenstein 3D, the maps were designed using Tile Editor (TEd). The woman character in the cover art was placed deliberately to catch the attention of viewers in game stores, despite not appearing in-game.

== Reception ==
The game was reviewed for the Polish magazine Świat Gier Komputerowych with the reviewer awarding it a score of 70%.

Reception

Review scores
| Publication | Score |
|---|---|
| PC Gamer (US) | 75% |
| Electronic Entertainment | 3/5 |
| Computer Player | 8/10 |

== Legacy ==
Apogee released the source code, long thought to be lost, under the GNU GPL-2.0-or-later license in 2013 to promote the sale of the Apogee Throwback Pack on Steam on July 8. The Steam release included support for Windows and MacOS.
