= Id Tech 5 =

Video game engine

id Tech 5
- Original author: John Carmack
- Developer: id Software
- Written in: C++, AMPL, Clipper, Python (AI)
- Platform: iOS, Microsoft Windows, OS X, PlayStation 3, PlayStation 4, Xbox 360, Xbox One
- Predecessor: id Tech 4
- Successor: id Tech 6
- License: Proprietary
- Website: idsoftware.com

id Tech 5 is a proprietary game engine developed by id Software. The engine was first demonstrated at the WWDC 2007 by John D. Carmack on an eight-core computer; however, the demo used only a single core with single-threaded OpenGL implementation running on a 512 MB 7000 class Quadro video card. id Tech 5 was first used in the video game Rage, followed by Wolfenstein: The New Order, The Evil Within and Wolfenstein: The Old Blood. It was followed by id Tech 6.

== Features ==
The initial demonstration of the engine featured 20 GB of texture data (using a more advanced MegaTexture approach called Virtual Texturing, which supports textures with resolutions up to 128,000 × 128,000 pixels), and a completely dynamic and changeable world. This technique allows the engine to automatically stream textures into memory as needed, meaning that developers need not concern themselves with memory restraints or texture limits. This has the advantage of simplifying the creation of content, by eliminating the need to adapt content for different platforms. The engine automatically optimizes resources for cross-platform development, making it possible to render the same models on different platforms, while creating them for only one platform, further simplifying cross-platform development.

One of the visually evident features the renderer included is a penumbra in the shadowing (soft edges), by using shadow maps. In contrast, id Tech 4, which featured volume-based shadows, had very sharply defined shadows. Numerous other advanced graphical effects such as various materials for lighting, high-dynamic-range rendering-centric effects, bloom, crepuscular rays (volumetric lighting), radiosity, soft particles, pixel shader effects, alpha to coverage, post processing, Screen Space Reflection, dynamic water surfaces, procedural animation, cloth simulation, depth of field, and motion blur, are contained. Multi-threaded processing on the CPU is done for many of its tasks, including rendering, game logic, AI, physics, and sound processing.

The engine comes with a content-creation tools package called id Studio, which is supposed to be much more user-friendly and polished than in earlier versions. Previously, content creation required artists to run various command-line tools beyond the level editor's own tools, while id Tech 5 allows for all work to be done 'in-engine'.

While id Software used the engine solely for creating shooter games, the engine also has the capability to operate outside of this genre. Steve Nix from id Software stated that "Not only do we think people can make games outside the action-shooter space with our technology, we encourage it. We'd actually like to see those games made."

== Marketing and licensing ==
The engine was first publicly shown during the 2007 Apple Worldwide Developers Conference keynote address, then was later shown privately to an audience of potential licensees at E3 2007. The first public demonstration focusing exclusively on the engine took place at QuakeCon in the same year during the annual keynote held by John Carmack.

An interview with John Carmack, the lead graphics engine developer at id (at the time), indicated that like its predecessors, id Tech 5 would eventually be released as open-source. The move to open source would likely come many years after id Tech 5's release as a proprietary engine. At QuakeCon 2007, Carmack told LinuxGames that he would integrate as little proprietary software as possible into id Tech 5, as "eventually id Tech 5 is going to be open source also. This is still the law of the land at id, that the policy is that we’re not going to integrate stuff that’s going to make it impossible for us to do an eventual open source release." Carmack resigned from id in 2013, and no source code release followed the launch of id Tech 6 in 2016.

At QuakeCon 2010, id CEO Todd Hollenshead announced that while id Tech 5 could be shared with internal ZeniMax Media developers, the engine will not be available for external licensing. On November 10, 2010, it was announced that the first ZeniMax internal developer to work with the engine would be MachineGames.

== Void and Stem engines ==
During the development of Dishonored 2, Arkane Studios rewrote the majority of the id Tech 5 for purposes required for the development of the game. The new version of the engine was named the "Void" engine. Arkane removed unneeded elements from the engine like the mini open world and overhauled the graphics. The new engine was intended to improve in-game lighting and post-processing to help the game's visuals, and allow the game to visualize subsurface scattering. The same engine was used in a standalone expansion pack Dishonored: Death of the Outsider. Arkane later made their 2021 game Deathloop also using the upgraded Void engine.

During the development of The Evil Within, Tango Gameworks also made heavy changes to the id Tech 5 engine for their own game. During the development of The Evil Within 2 further changes were made; the new version of the engine was named the "Stem" engine.

== Games using id Tech 5 ==
Year	Title	Developer
2010	Rage: Mutant Bash TV	id Software
2011	Rage	id Software
2014	Wolfenstein: The New Order	MachineGames
2014	The Evil Within	Tango Gameworks
2015	Wolfenstein: The Old Blood	MachineGames
2017	The Evil Within 2	Tango Gameworks

== See also ==
- First-person shooter engine
- List of game engines
