= Quake engine =

Video game engine developed by id Software

- Developers: id Software (John Carmack, Michael Abrash, John Cash)
- Final release: 1.09 / December 21, 1999; 26 years ago
- Written in: C, Assembly (for software rendering & optimization)
- Platform: DOS, AmigaOS, Microsoft Windows, macOS, Linux, Nintendo 64, Zeebo, Xbox One, Xbox Series X/S, PlayStation 4, PlayStation 5
- Predecessor: Doom engine
- Successor: Quake II engine, GoldSrc
- License: GNU GPL-2.0-or-later
- Website: www.idsoftware.com
- Repository: github.com/id-Software/Quake

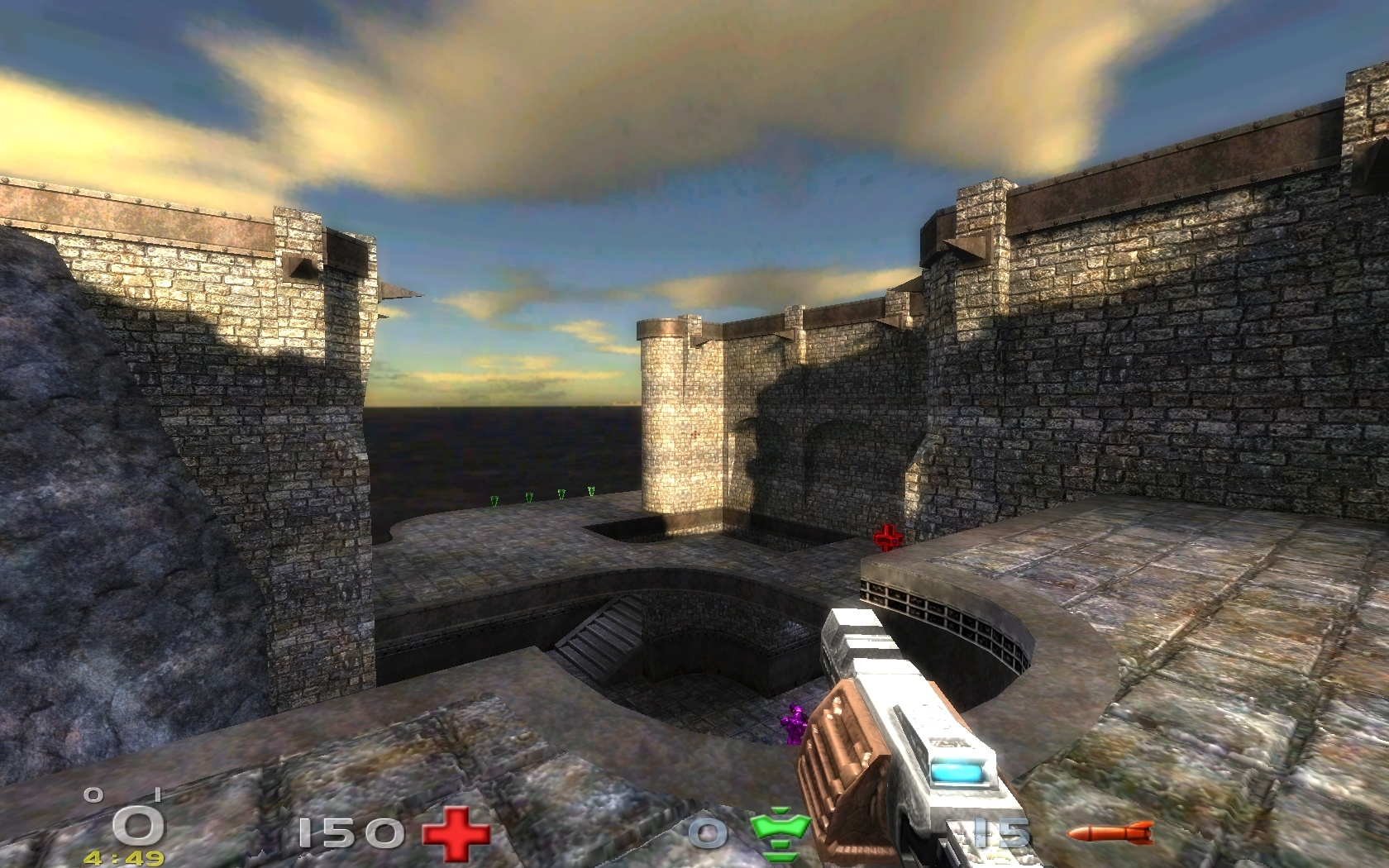
In-game screenshot of the first-person shooter Nexuiz, running on a modified Quake engine

The Quake engine is the game engine developed by id Software to power their 1996 video game Quake. It featured true 3D real-time rendering. Since 1999, it has been licensed under the terms of GNU General Public License v2.0 or later.

After release, the Quake engine was immediately forked. Much of the engine remained in Quake II and Quake III Arena. The Quake engine, like the Doom engine, uses binary space partitioning (BSP) to optimize the world rendering. The Quake engine also uses Gouraud shading for moving objects, and a static lightmap for non-moving objects.

== History ==
The Quake engine was developed from 1995 for the video game Quake, released on June 22, 1996. John Carmack did most of the programming of the engine, with help from Michael Abrash in algorithms and assembly optimization.

John Romero initially conceived of Quake as an action game taking place in a fully 3D polygon world, inspired by Sega AM2's 3D fighting game Virtua Fighter. Quake was also intended to feature Virtua Fighter-influenced third-person melee combat. However, id Software considered it to be risky, and it would have taken longer to develop the engine. Because the project was taking too long, the third-person melee was eventually dropped.

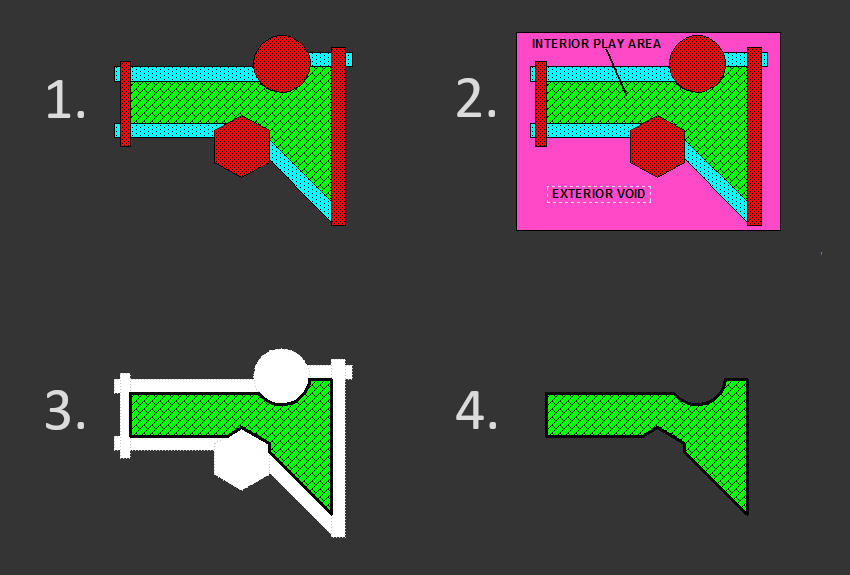
Simplified process of reducing map complexity in Quake: 1. Brushes used to define a play area; 2. Preprocessor identifies interior spaces and external void; 3. Preprocessor prunes faces that are not visible in the play area; 4. Final processed game map

== Derivative engines ==
Family tree illustrating derivations of Quake engines

On December 21, 1999, John Carmack of id Software released the Quake engine source code on the Internet under the terms of GPL-2.0-or-later, allowing programmers to edit the engine and add new features. Programmers were soon releasing new versions of the engine on the net. Some of the best-known engines are:

- GoldSrc – The first engine to be created by Valve. It was used in the Half-Life series, and gave rise to the Source and Source 2 engines. The Xash3D projects, as well as the FreeHL and FreeCS ports, use Quake source code in part to recreate this engine, even with a wrapper for running the game.
- DarkPlaces – A significantly modified engine used in several standalone games and Quake mods. Although the last stable release was on May 13, 2014, it has received numerous updates through its SVN repository since then. Its home page was hosted on Icculus.org until 2021, when the engine switched to a Git repository hosted on GitHub. The developers of Xonotic provide mirrors of DarkPlaces source code on various social coding platforms since the game is built on and distributed with the development version of the engine.
- QuakeForge - One of the earlier major community ports.
- NPRQuake - Fork of Quake featuring non-photorealistic rendering giving it a pencil drawn look.
- Tenebrae - Custom Quake engine with real time lighting and bumpmapping among other features.
- TyrQuake - A conservative focused source port.
- Fisheye Quake - Custom Quake engine with fisheye distortion by the author of PanQuake.
  - Blinky - Fork of the fisheye view along with the TyrQuake software renderer.
- WinQuake
  - Engoo (Derivative of WinQuake) - Graphically enhanced software renderer based port.
- Fruitz of Dojo - Source port aimed at Mac OS X.
- NehQuake - Custom engine for the Nehara mod.
- GLQuake
  - FitzQuake (Derivative of GLQuake) - Seminal port whose SDL version was later forked into numerous others.
    - MarkV (Derivative of FitzQuake, successor to DirectQ) - Came in both GLQuake and WinQuake derived versions.
    - Quakespasm (Derivative of FitzQuake) – Commonly used source port.
      - Quakespasm-Spiked (Derivative of Quakespasm) - Limit-removing fork.
      - vkQuake – (Derivative of Quakespasm) – Uses Vulkan API for rendering programmed by id Software employee Axel Gneiting, released under the GPLv2.
      - Ironwail - (Derivative of Quakespasm) – An engine aiming at maximum performance.
- FTEQW (Derivative of QuakeWorld) - A modern client for online multiplayer.
- FuhQuake
  - ezQuake (Derivative of FuhQuake) - Multiplayer focused port often paired with the nQuake launcher.
  - JoeQuake (Derivative of FuhQuake) - A port popular with speedrunners.

== Games using the Quake engine ==
=== Games using a proprietary license ===
Year	Title	Developer(s)	Publisher(s)
1996	Quake	id Software	GT Interactive
1997	Quake Mission Pack No. 1: Scourge of Armagon	Hipnotic Interactive	3D Realms
1997	Quake Mission Pack No. 2: Dissolution of Eternity	Rogue Entertainment	3D Realms
1997	Hexen II	Raven Software	id Software, Activision
1997	Malice	Ratloop	Quantum Axcess
1997	X-Men: The Ravages of Apocalypse	Zero Gravity Entertainment	WizardWorks
1998	Hexen II Mission Pack: Portal of Praevus	Raven Software	id Software; Activision
2000	Laser Arena	Trainwreck Studios	ValuSoft

=== Games based on the GPL source release ===
Year	Title	Developer(s)	Publisher(s)
2000	OpenQuartz	OpenQuartz Team	SourceForge
2001	Transfusion	Transfusion Project	SourceForge
2005	Nexuiz	Alientrap	Alientrap
2007	The Hunted	Chris Page	ModDB
2011	Xonotic	Team Xonotic	Team Xonotic
2011	Steel Storm	Kot-in-Action Creative Artel	Kot-in-Action Creative Artel
2012	Forced: Leashed	Kepuli Games	Kepuli Games
2012	RetroBlazer	Hydra Game Works	Hydra Game Works
2013	Chaos Esque Anthology	Chaos Esque Team	Chaos Esque Team
2015	Rexuiz	Rexuiz Team	Rexuiz Team
2017	FreeCS	FreeCS Team	GitHub
2018	FortressOne	FortressOne Team	FortressOne Team
2018	The Wastes	Vera Visions L.L.C	Vera Visions L.L.C
2019 (Early access)	LibreQuake	LibreQuake Team	GitHub
2021 (Early access)	Doombringer	Anomic Games	Anomic Games
2024	Wrath: Aeon of Ruin	Killpixel	3D Realms; 1C Entertainment
2025	Brazilian Drug Dealer 3: I Opened a Portal to Hell in the Favela Trying To Revive Mit Aia I Need to Close It	Joeveno	Joeveno, NoQuarter
2026	MeowGun: Hell Denizen	SusaDeBastet	SusaDeBastet
2026	Brazilian Drug Dealer Before 4: Demons From The Portal To Hell I Opened Are Still In The Favela And Now I Have To Save Mamadas From Ronaldo	Joeveno	Joeveno, NoQuarter

== See also ==
- List of game engines
- First person shooter engine
- id Tech
- Quake II engine
- Quake modding
