= Paul Wedgwood =

Video game developer

- Born: June 1970 (age 56)
- Occupation: Co-founder of Splash Damage

Paul Wedgwood (born June 1970) is one of three founders of video game developer Splash Damage and was the CEO of the company until end of 2018.

== Career ==
Paul Wedgwood was born in June 1970. Wedgwood started his career in the early 1990s as a network engineer attending major clients such as the Home Office and 10 Downing Street. However he first joined the games industry in 1999 when he became infrastructure manager for BarrysWorld a multiplayer gaming website and ISP. During this time he spent much of his time working as a presenter and commentator on a videogame TV show broadcasting to Australasia, called Lock 'n Load.

Alongside Barrysworld, Wedgwood worked as part of an amateur development team under his online alias 'Locki' on a modification of the game Quake III Arena entitled Q3F. A number of these core members later went on to form the video game developer Splash Damage in May 2001.

=== Splash Damage ===
After founding Splash Damage, Wedgwood was credited on a number of games including Wolfenstein: Enemy Territory, Doom 3, Quake Wars and Brink.

In July 2016, the sale of Splash Damage to Leyou was announced, for up to $150 million by Wedgwood, its sole owner, co-founder and chief executive.

By then end of 2018, he officially stepped down as CEO of Splash Damage. Richard Jolly was appointed as the new CEO.

=== Supernova Capital ===
Later in 2018, Wedgwood and other former Splash Damage members formed Supernova Capital, an investment firm. Supernova made its first acquisition in March 2019 with the studio Flying Wild Hog.

In November 2020, Supernova sold Flying Wild Hog to Swedish gaming holding company Embracer Group (through its subsidiary Koch Media GmbH) for $137million.

In 2024, several subsidiaries of Supernova Capital, co-founded by Paul Wedgwood, collapsed. Among them, French game studio Mi‑Clos, which had been acquired by Supernova Capital in February 2023, announced its closure after 14 years in operation. Similarly, indie developer Little Red Dog Games shut down operations.

Supernova's events division, Player1 Events, which organized the long-running Insomnia Gaming Festival, also entered insolvency, reportedly accumulating debts of up to £8 million. This led to the dismissal of all staff, cancellation of the 2024 RuneFest convention, and public complaints from content creators who claimed they were still owed money.

In May 2025, the official Insomnia Gaming Festival social media channels posted updates announcing the event's planned return and attempting to distance the brand from Player1 Events. The new messaging emphasized a “new team” and a “community-first” approach. Despite this, it is widely believed that Wedgwood continues to own the Insomnia Gaming Festival's parent company.
