= Dirty Bomb (video game) =

- Developer(s): Splash Damage
- Publisher(s): Nexon (2013-2017); WarChest (2017-present)
- Engine: Unreal Engine 3
- Platform(s): Microsoft Windows
- Release: October 2013 _{(Closed beta)} 2 June 2015 _{(Open beta)}
- Genre(s): First-person shooter
- Mode(s): multiplayer

Dirty Bomb, formerly known as Extraction, is a free to play first-person shooter multiplayer video game. It was developed by Splash Damage and initially published by Nexon America for Microsoft Windows, and open beta version was released in June 2015. As of February 2017, Warchest, an in-house publishing arm of Splash Damage has taken over from Nexon America as the publisher for the game. Dirty Bomb is Splash Damage's first intellectual property.

== Plot ==
In 2020, an atomic explosion occurred in London caused an epidemic contamination of toxic gas spreading throughout the streets, resulting in an evacuation plan. This event was known as the "Dirty Bomb" incident. In response to the hazardous disasters, a new government system called the Central Disaster Authority (CDA) hired mercenaries to fix and coverup the radiation incident. Simultaneously, a criminal syndicate called the Jackal hired their own group of mercenaries to steal the CDA technology that were used to maintain the contaminated air. A stand-off between two factions battle on while the toxic gas continues to spread until there is nothing left standing in its way.

== Gameplay ==
At the beginning of a match, the player is placed on one of two teams, either Jackal or CDA, and must complete various objectives in order to win the round whilst fighting both the opposing team and the clock. The player can choose up to three mercenaries, or "mercs", to play as during the round and can switch between them freely between lives. Teamwork and communication are strongly encouraged during the game, hinted at by the ability to revive 'downed' players, as well as the fact that being the "lone wolf" often leads to a short life. The gameplay is based on Splash Damage's previous titles Wolfenstein: Enemy Territory, Enemy Territory: Quake Wars and Brink, such as similar classes, gameplay objectives, and certain classes having access to abilities like placing ammunition packs, healing stations, or sentry guns. The main goal of the attacking team either begins by repairing and escorting an Extraction Vehicle, abbreviated to 'EV' in-game, to a predetermined location, or to plant a C4 Charge on a certain target. The objectives after that point are more varied from map to map; for example, on the maps Trainyard, Bridge, and Dome the attackers' goal is now to steal data cores/drug samples from the defending team and deliver them to a helicopter or other area, while on the rest of the maps, the objectives are only to destroy various targets. Available on each map are 'side objectives'; objectives that are not mandatory to complete, but assist the attacking team in completing their ultimate goal. Attackers are encouraged to take advantage of these side objectives before the defending team is able to seize them. There are two playable game modes: Objective and Stopwatch. Execution was formerly the third game mode until it was removed by Splash Damage.

In Objective mode, the aim is for the attacking team to complete all of the maps objectives before the time runs out. If they are unable to do so, the defending team wins. In Stopwatch mode, the mode is similar to Objective but there are actually two games played, one in which the player is attacking, and the other in which the player is defending. The team that completes the objectives faster wins the game. It is possible for games to end in a draw, and overtime is also implemented where appropriate. In Execution mode, there were two ways for the attackers to win, either kill all the enemy players or plant C-4 and destroy one of two available pylons. The defenders can win by defusing the C-4 after the attackers have planted the C-4, or by killing all the enemy players, or if the 2-minute time limit expires. It operates in a best of 12 rounds system, where the first team to win 7 rounds wins the game. Draws are also possible if both teams win 6 times. In Execution mode, there are no respawns, so if the player dies, they must wait until the round is finished before they can resume playing in the next round. Players that are incapacitated although not completely finished can still be revived by medics, or be helped up by any teammate to continue fighting. After 6 rounds, the attackers and defenders switch sides. Objective and Stopwatch modes have 8 maps available, including Chapel, Underground, Bridge, Terminal, Dome, Dockyard, Castle and Trainyard. After a game is complete, there is a voting system where the players in the lobby can vote on one out of 3 maps (in rotation), and the map with the most votes gets selected. Execution mode formerly had 3 maps: Market, Overground and Gallery.

== Development ==
During development, the name changed from Dirty Bomb to Extraction and back to the original name, Dirty Bomb. Dirty Bomb entered open beta as a free-to-play game in June 2015 on the digital distribution platform, Steam. In the first release of the game the player could choose from 12 playable mercenaries. The two initial modes were 5 vs 5 and 8 vs 8. As of January 2018 there are 23 mercs available. Each month the development team releases an update to either fix issues in the game or to add new content such as maps, mercs, events, etc.

On October 18, 2018, Splash Damage announced they will be ending all live developments and updates on the game. They confirmed that they would not be able to financially support development.

== Reception ==
Reception

Aggregate score
Aggregator	Score
Metacritic	63/100

Review scores
Publication	Score
GameWatcher	8/10
Digitally Downloaded	3.5/5
AusGamers	7/10

Dirty Bomb received positive and average reviews with a 63 Metacritic score based on eight critic reviews.
