= Bits (TV series) =

- Genre: Entertainment
- Presented by: Aleks Krotoski; Emily Newton Dunn; Emily Booth; Claudia Trimde
- Country of origin: United Kingdom
- Original language: English
- No. of series: 5
- No. of episodes: 73 (plus 8 specials)

Production
- Running time: 25 minutes
- Production company: Ideal World

Original release
- Network: Channel 4
- Release: 4 June 1999 – 6 April 2001

Related
- Thumb Bandits

Bits is a British entertainment television series that aired on Channel 4 from 4 June 1999 to 6 April 2001, with both late night and edited morning versions of the show, the show reviewed computer games, testing the (then) latest games releases across multiple platforms.

Five series were produced and, uniquely at the time for a show about computer games, had an all female presentation team.

There were also a number of special episodes, notably a three-parter in early 2000 titled the Bits 'Super Console Tour' which primarily featured the girls challenging various "pro" gamers in 1v1 battles around the UK in each episode (London, Blackpool, and one other location), as well as their usual sketches and short reviews and newsclips. The games chosen were usually new releases on various consoles, one of which was FantaVision on the newly launched PlayStation 2, at which Emily Booth was defeated by Alek Hayes, who was employed at the time at BarrysWorld.

== Transmissions ==
Series	Block	Start date	End date	Episodes
1	4Later	4 June 1999	20 August 1999	12
2	4Later	27 August 1999	28 November 1999	12
3	4Later	11 April 2000	28 July 2000	15
3	T4	16 April 2000	16 July 2000	10
4	4Later	2 October 2000	18 December 2000	12
5	4Later	20 January 2001	6 April 2001	12
Specials	4Later	5 January 2000	23 September 2000	8
