= Splash Damage =

British video game developer

Splash Damage Ltd.
- Type: Subsidiary
- Industry: Video games
- Founded: 2001; 25 years ago
- Founders: Paul Wedgwood; Richard Jolly; Arnout van Meer
- Headquarters: Bromley, London, England
- Products: Enemy Territory: Quake Wars; Wolfenstein: Enemy Territory
- Number of employees: 400+ (2021)
- Parent: Splash Damage Group (2016–present)
- Website: www.splashdamage.com

Splash Damage Ltd. is a British video game developer specialising in multiplayer first-person shooter video games. The studio is best known as the creators of Wolfenstein: Enemy Territory and Enemy Territory: Quake Wars.

== History ==
=== Formation (2001) ===
Splash Damage was formed in May or June 2001 by the creators of mods such as Quake 3 Fortress, who was then joined by a number of modders from the Team Fortress and Quake 3 modding scene. The studio began life working with Now TV and Gamer.tv, providing both custom maps and an in-game television production solution. Splash Damage staff also worked to produce and present over 150 TV shows based on Quake III Arena Capture the Flag, creating editing tools and virtual cameras, and editing in-game footage.

=== Enemy Territory Era (2002–2007) ===
In March 2002, Splash Damage partnered with Games Domain to produce a number of multiplayer maps for their online gaming service. One of these was the map Operation Market Garden for id Software's Return to Castle Wolfenstein which immediately became the most played third-party map for the game.

Following Market Garden's success, Activision and id Software asked Splash Damage to produce three additional multiplayer maps for the Return to Castle Wolfenstein Game of the Year Edition.

The same year, Splash Damage partnered with the two companies to develop Wolfenstein: Enemy Territory, a stand-alone expansion based on Return to Castle Wolfenstein. This was originally envisioned to include both a single-player campaign developed by Mad Doc Software and a multiplayer mode developed by Splash Damage, however the single player campaign was dropped.

The Windows version of Wolfenstein: Enemy Territory was released online for free on 29 May 2003, with Linux and Mac versions following later. Wolfenstein: Enemy Territory won several Game of the Year and Editor's Choice awards, and was nominated for a BAFTA.

In June 2003 and once again working with id Software, Splash Damage created all the maps for Doom 3's multiplayer mode.

At the same time as Doom 3, Splash Damage began pre-production on Enemy Territory: Quake Wars, a follow-up to Wolfenstein: Enemy Territory using a heavily modified version of the id Tech 4 engine and set in the Quake universe, adding a first for the series in the form of vehicles.

Splash Damage grew from seven people on the team at the start to thirty by the end of the project, in part due to the challenge of creating brand new assets rather than using existing ones from previous titles.

Enemy Territory: Quake Wars shipped on 28 September 2007, and has won dozens of awards to date, including several Game of the Year awards and over 25 Editor's Choice awards. The game was later ported to Xbox 360 by Nerve Software who had also contributed a number of maps to the PC version.

=== Later games & Warchest/Fireteam (2008–2015) ===
In 2008, Splash Damage announced it would be partnering with Bethesda Softworks on an unannounced title. In 2009, Splash Damage and Bethesda announced Brink, which would eventually be released in May 2011 and was Splash Damage’s first multiplatform title. In August 2011 Splash Damage and Bethesda released the Agents of Change DLC for Brink.

In 2012, Splash Damage launched a publishing division called Warchest and a back-end technology business called Fireteam. It was described as “Splash Damage’s call-to-arms for free-to-play games that are both high-quality and non-exploitative.” These smaller companies went on to publish and support a number of future Splash Damage titles.

Warchest’s first published game was RAD Soldiers, released in December 2012 on iOS devices, another first for Splash Damage. The tactics-styled game was released after five months of open public testing and over 100,000 pre-registrations, and was made available PC as a free download in the Chrome Web Store in 2013.

On 25 October 2013 Splash Damage partnered with Warner Bros. Interactive Entertainment to create the multiplayer mode for Batman Arkham Origins. Named Invisible Predator Online, this was the Batman Arkham series' first multiplayer mode.

16 February 2015 saw the launch of Splash Damage’s second Warchest-published title and second mobile title with Tempo, released exclusively on iOS.

Dirty Bomb was released on 1 June 2015, entering its open beta phase after two years in closed beta. The free-to-play multiplayer first person shooter title launched on PC with 12 playable mercenaries and two game modes, with more mercenaries, modes and events added over the game’s lifespan. Dirty Bomb was originally published by Nexon, but the publishing rights were transferred to WarChest in 2017. On 18 October 2018 Splash Damage announced it was ending all live developments and updates on the game, but also removed all monetization and made the game completely free to play.

=== Microsoft partnership (2015–2020) ===
2015 saw the start of Splash Damage’s partnership with Microsoft and The Coalition, as it provided development support on Gears Of War Ultimate Edition which released on 25 August 2015 for Xbox and 1 March 2016 for PC.

This partnership continued into 2016, as Splash Damage provided multiplayer support on Gears of War 4. This included level design, art support and matchmaking, with the game releasing worldwide on 11 October 2016.

Earlier, in July 2016, Splash Damage, alongside its sister companies Warchest and Fireteam, were acquired by Leyou, a Chinese holding company, via its Radius Maxima subsidiary.

In 2019, Splash Damage provided similar development help for Gears 5, working on level design and art for various multiplayer modes including Versus and Escape; a mode new to the Gears franchise.

Escape mode also included a map editor which utilised a special tile system, and Splash Damage was involved in building these tiles. Gears 5 launched on 10 September 2019 for Xbox One and PC, with an upgraded version for Xbox Series S/X launching on 10 November 2020.

Also in 2019, Splash Damage worked on another Microsoft title: Halo: The Master Chief Collection, in partnership with 343 Industries. Splash Damage was involved in porting the title to PC, and this version of the title released on 3 December 2019.

Splash Damage’s next game in this partnership was Gears Tactics, a turn-based strategy game set 12 years before the original Gears of War game. Gears Tactics released on 28 April 2020 for PC and 10 November 2020 for Xbox consoles, and was nominated for Best Sim/Strategy game at The Game Awards 2020.

=== Tencent buyout (2020 – present) ===
In March 2020, Splash Damage announced a new partnership, this time with Google Stadia. Outcasters was announced in July 2020 as an exclusive title for the Google Stadia platform, and published by its Games and Entertainment division. Outcasters is a competitive online multiplayer top-down shooter set in a stylised "vinyl world", and launched on 3 December 2020. It is one of a small number of titles to take advantage of Stadia’s Crowd Play and Crowd Choice features, allowing viewers to play the game with a streamer. However, following the shut down of the Stadia Games and Entertainment division in February 2021, the publishing rights for Outcasters reverted back to Warchest on 31 May 2021.

On 23 December 2020 Tencent officially acquired Splash Damage’s parent company Leyou. In a blog post published at the time, the studio stressed that it would be retaining its independence and will "operate as an independent entity within the Tencent family". CEO Richard Jolly further expanded on this in an interview with gamesindustry.biz where he also spoke about Splash Damage’s expansion, future projects and plans. Radius Maxima was rebranded Splash Damage Group in February 2021.

On 13 October 2021 Splash Damage announced that it is working on a “brand new game in an original sci-fi universe”. No further details are known about the project, but it is one of “several ambitious projects” in production at the studio.

On 8 December 2022, during the 2022 Game Awards, it was announced Splash Damage's next game would be Transformers: Reactivate, a 1-4 player online action game based on the franchise of the same name.

On 9 December 2022 it was announced Splash Damage had acquired the Derby-based games studio Bulkhead, for an undisclosed sum.

On 16 March 2023 Splash Damage, along with streamers Shroud and Sacriel, announced a partnership on a new project called "Project Astrid", an open-world survival game.

On 8 January 2025 it was announced that Splash Damage had ceased development on Transformers: Reactivate and would be scaling down the studio.

On the 26th September 2025, it was confirmed that Splash Damage had been sold by Tencent to an unknown group of private equity investors.

On 26 February 2026, Splash Damage acquired Scum developer Gamepires from Jagex. Gamepires joined Splash Damage Group, with Ben Hopkinson, previously Splash Damage’s chief financial officer, becoming CEO of the group. The acquisition was backed by Emona Capital.

== Games developed ==
Year	Title	Platform(s)	Publisher(s)
2002	Return to Castle Wolfenstein (multiplayer)	Microsoft Windows, Linux, Mac	Activision
2003	Wolfenstein: Enemy Territory	Microsoft Windows, Linux, Mac	Activision
2004	Doom 3 (multiplayer)	Microsoft Windows, Linux, Mac	Activision
2007	Enemy Territory: Quake Wars	Microsoft Windows, Linux, Mac, PlayStation 3, Xbox 360	Activision
2011	Brink	Microsoft Windows, PlayStation 3, Xbox 360	Bethesda Softworks
2012	RAD Soldiers	iOS, Web	Warchest
2013	Batman: Arkham Origins (multiplayer)	Microsoft Windows, PlayStation 3, Xbox 360	Warner Bros. Interactive Entertainment
2014	Dirty Bomb	Microsoft Windows	Nexon (until 2017), Warchest (from 2017)
2015	Tempo	iOS	Warchest
2015	Gears of War: Ultimate Edition	Microsoft Windows, Xbox One, Xbox Series Consoles	Xbox Game Studios
2016	Gears of War 4 (multiplayer)	Microsoft Windows, Xbox One, Xbox Series Consoles	Xbox Game Studios
2019	Gears 5 (multiplayer)	Microsoft Windows, Xbox One, Xbox Series Consoles	Xbox Game Studios
2019	Halo: The Master Chief Collection (PC version)	Microsoft Windows, Xbox One, Xbox Series Consoles	Xbox Game Studios
2020	Gears Tactics	Microsoft Windows, Xbox One, Xbox Series Consoles	Xbox Game Studios
2020	Outcasters (discontinued)	Google Stadia	Stadia Games and Entertainment (until May 2021), Warchest (from May 2021)
Cancelled	Transformers: Reactivate	PC, consoles	
TBA	Project Astrid	To be announced	To be announced

== Awards ==
Date	Award	Result
2008	Golden Joystick award for UK Developer of the Year	Nominated
2009	Guardian Top 100 UK Tech & Media Companies	Won
2016	Amazon Growing Business Awards	Nominated
