= X Revolution =

X Revolution may refer to:

- Twitter Revolution, revolutions and protests that featured the use of X (formerly Twitter)
- "Revolution X" (video game), 1994 shooting gallery video game
- "Revolution (Marvel Comics)", revamp of Marvel Comics' X-Men-related comic books known colloquially as X-Revolution
