= Timothee Besset =

French software programmer

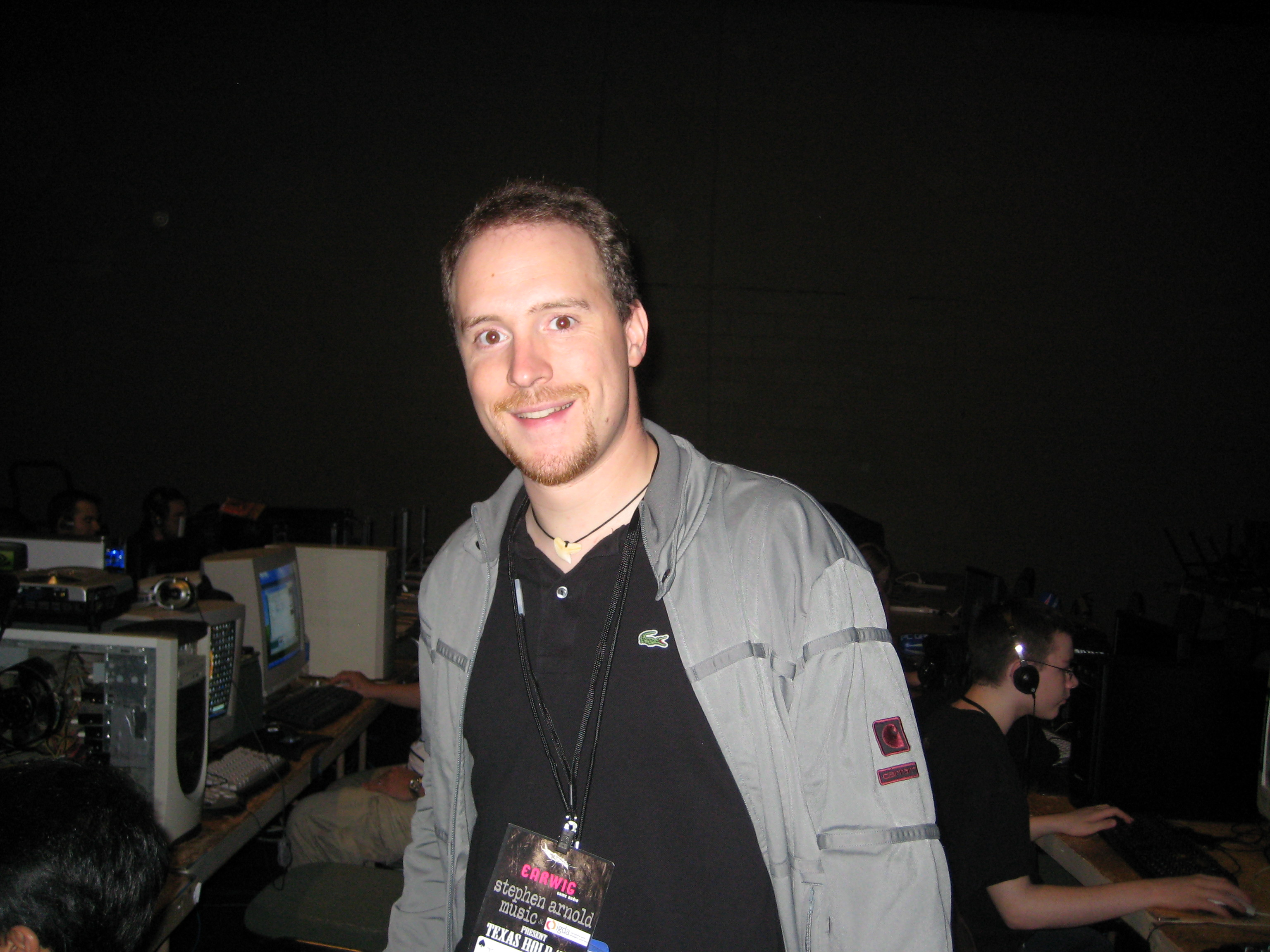
- Besset at QuakeCon 2007
- Born: 1976 (age 49–50)
- Other name: TTimo
- Spouse: Christine

Timothée Besset (also known as TTimo) is a French software programmer, best known for supporting Linux, as well as some Macintosh, ports of id Software's products. He was involved with the game ports of various id properties through the 2000s, starting with Quake III Arena. Since the development of Doom 3 he was also in charge of the multiplayer network code and various aspects of game coding for id, a role which had him heavily involved in the development of their online game QuakeLive. Since departing id in January 2012 he has worked as a software contractor, including for Valve Software.

He has been occasionally called "zerowing", but he has never gone by that name himself. It is derived from the community oriented system zerowing.idsoftware.com, of which the Linux port pages were the most prominent. The system was actually named by Christian Antkow based on the Zero Wing meme.

== Life and career ==
Besset grew up in France, and started programming in the early 1990s. In school he majored in computer science, as well as pursuing courses in chemistry, mechanics, and fluid mechanics. Through school he was also first introduced to Linux, originally only for system administration and networking, and eventually adopting it for his main system. His first serious game development project was working on QERadiant, a free game editor tool for id Software games. Through his work on the editor he got to know Robert Duffy, who was at that point working as a contractor for id. After he got hired full-time, Duffy managed to secure Timothee a contract to work on the new cross-platform GtkRadiant editor project in 2000. This eventually led to Timothee being hired to become id's official Linux port maintainer after they took back the support rights to the Linux release of Quake III Arena from the then floundering Loki Software.

His first actual porting project came with the release of Return to Castle Wolfenstein in 2001, with the Linux client being released on March 16, 2002. This was followed about a year later by the release of Wolfenstein: Enemy Territory, with the Linux builds sharing the same release date as the Windows release. His next porting work came with the release of Doom 3, with him releasing the first Linux builds on October 4, 2004. Around this time he also assumed the responsibility of becoming in charge of network coding for id. On October 20, 2005 he released the Linux binaries for Quake 4. This was followed by him releasing the source code for GtkRadiant under the GNU General Public License on February 17, 2006. His next porting project was porting Enemy Territory: Quake Wars, with Linux binaries being released on October 19, 2007.

He also worked on the Quake Live project, with the game entering an invitation-based closed beta in 2008 and an open beta on February 24, 2009, with Linux and Macintosh support coming on August 18, 2009. In response to fears by some in the Linux gaming community that id would abandon Linux with its future titles, on September 13, 2009 in a well publicized statement he reaffirmed id's support of Linux, stating in his blog that "Fundamentally nothing has changed with our policy regarding Linux games... I'll be damned if we don't find the time to get Linux builds done".

In January 2012, Besset resigned from id Software, ending hope for future Linux builds (though Doom 3 BFG Edition came to Linux via source port). A year later John Carmack revealed that ZeniMax Media "doesn't have any policy of 'unofficial binaries'", and so prevented id Software from pursuing any sort of third-party builds as it had in the past, be it Linux ports or experimental releases, and he then suggested the use of Wine instead.

On July 2, 2012, he was announced to have joined Frozen Sand, which was then developing Urban Terror HD.

In September 2016, he ported Rocket League to SteamOS/Linux with the help of Ryan C. Gordon

As of January 2024 he was reported as working on the Linux Steam client among other contract work for Valve Software.

== Games credited ==
- Quake III Arena
- Urban Terror
- Return to Castle Wolfenstein
- Wolfenstein: Enemy Territory
- Doom 3
- Doom 3: Resurrection of Evil
- Quake 4
- Enemy Territory: Quake Wars
- Quake Live
- Rocket League

== See also ==
- Dave D. Taylor
- Ryan C. Gordon
