= The Virtual Revolution =

- The Virtual Revolution title
- Genre: Technology
- Presented by: Aleks Krotoski
- Country of origin: United Kingdom
- Original language: English
- No. of series: 1
- No. of episodes: 4

Production
- Executive producer: Dominic Crossley-Holland
- Producer: Russell Barnes
- Running time: 60 minutes
- Production companies: BBC; Open University

Original release
- Network: BBC Two, BBC HD
- Release: 30 January – 20 February 2010

The Virtual Revolution is a British television documentary series and interactive web experience presented by Aleks Krotoski, which began airing on BBC Two on 30 January 2010. A co-production between the BBC and the Open University, the series looks at the impact the World Wide Web has had since its inception 20 years ago. The series took a different approach to BBC documentary making by encouraging an open and collaborative production.

== Production ==
The series was announced on 10 July 2009, under the working title of Digital Revolution, to examine the impact the World Wide Web has had on society over its first 20 years. Technology journalist and academic Aleks Krotoski would present. The series was launched with an event at the BBC to mark the twentieth anniversary of the World Wide Web, which saw Tim Berners-Lee (credited with inventing the World Wide Web), Susan Greenfield, Bill Thompson and Chris Anderson discuss the World Wide Web.

The production team took a different approach to the development of the series, described by series producer Russell Barnes as "radical" and "open-source": "We don't just want to observe bloggers from on high; we want to blog ourselves and get feedback and comment on our ideas." He described the four phases the production would take; firstly conducting interviews and inviting comments from users on the programme's blog, the second would see rushes released for others to re-use under a permissive license, thirdly, web users would be engaged, working with the Web Science Research Initiative, and the fourth would be an online, interactive version of the series available after it has finished. The digital elements were commissioned by Lisa Sargood and produced by Dan Biddle and Dan Gluckmann.

The programme team interviewed a number of people who have played a part in the development of the web, including its inventor Sir Tim Berners-Lee and founders of notable brands; Bill Gates (Microsoft), Steve Wozniak (Apple), Chad Hurley (YouTube), Jimmy Wales (Wikipedia), Stewart Brand (The WELL), Biz Stone and Evan Williams (Twitter), Peter Thiel (PayPal) and Martha Lane Fox (lastminute.com). Academics, including Terry Winograd, Sherry Turkle, A. C. Grayling, David Runciman, Ross Anderson and Nigel Shadbolt, commentators, including David Weinberger, Lee Siegel, Douglas Rushkoff, Andrew Keen and Stephen Fry, and Estonian President Toomas Ilves were also interviewed. Footage of the interviews was also made available on the programme's website.

In October 2009 and while being interviewed for the series, Stephen Fry made a request on Twitter for people to suggest names for the series, with the final decision being made by the BBC. The chosen title, The Virtual Revolution, is described by the producers as "a mashup between us and you".

== Episodes ==
No.	Title	Directed by	Original release date	Viewers (overnight estimates)
1	"The Great Levelling?"	Philip Smith	30 January 2010	1.2 million
The first programme examines the idea of the World Wide Web as a "great leveller", and how this has shaped the development of the web. Looking at the web as an empowering tool and the access provided to knowledge, Krotoski visits Einar Kvaran, contributor to the online encyclopaedia Wikipedia. To understand how the web gave rise to Wikipedia, she looks at early online community The WELL, which flourished from the counter-culture and libertarianism of the 1960s, speaking to founder Stewart Brand and John Perry Barlow, who spoke up for online freedom. Al Gore speaks about blogs and expressing ideas, and Krotoski visits Ory Okolloh, founder of Ushahidi, which gave people a voice following the unrest after the 2007 Kenyan elections. She then talks with Sir Tim Berners-Lee about inventing the World Wide Web while he was at CERN in the 1980s. Kenyan farmer Kudjo Agbevi discusses empowerment, and Berners-Lee, Barlow and Andrew Keen speak about the lack of a controlling authority and hierarchy. Krotoski then examines the conflict between freedom/collaboration and making a profit, speaking to Microsoft founder Bill Gates and Charles Leadbeater. Shawn Fanning then talks about the beginnings of Napster, challenging traditional business models. YouTube founder Chad Hurley talks about user-generated content and rapper Master Shortie tells Krotoski about using the web as a promotional tool. Arianna Huffington of The Huffington Post talks about combining old and new media, Keen talks about hierarchy and Berners-Lee warns of central control. Krotoski speaks to Jimmy Wales of Wikipedia about the community structure and to conclude, contributors talk about hierarchy. Other contributors include Lee Siegel, Steve Wozniak and Stephen Fry.
2	"Enemy of the State?"	Francis Hanly	6 February 2010	TBA
Krotoski explores how the web affects politics and the struggle for power in both democratic and authoritarian states; and also how the internet has inspired freedom of speech via social networking sites such as Facebook and Twitter. Krotoski also interviews Austin Heap in relation to a piece of software called 'Haystack', an anti-censorship tool for use against the authorities in Iran, being developed by Austin Heap at the time. Krotoski looks at the history of Twitter, and how in the 2009 Iranian presidential election aftermath, it helped civilians send information about the protests to the rest of the world. She then speaks to Biz Stone and Evan Williams about the use of Twitter. She then looks at what the internet was originally designed for, and goes to Advanced Research Projects Agency who designed ARPANET. Krotoski talks to Vint Cerf, who, along with Bob Kahn, invented internet protocols and packet switching. Includes interviews with Al Gore, Jeff Bezos, Sir Tim Berners-Lee, Clay Shirky, Stephen Fry, Ishtiaq Hussain, Martha Lane Fox, Paul Meijer and oxfordgirl.
3	"The Cost of Free"	Dan Kendall	13 February 2010	TBA
4	"Homo Interneticus?"	Molly Milton	20 February 2010	1.3 Million

== Reception ==
Overnight estimates indicated that 1.2 million people watched the first episode, a 5% audience share.

In reviewing the first episode, Tom Sutcliffe in The Independent, was "glad" the programme contained the "odd sceptic too", said Krotoski was a "fine presenter" & that the series was both "premature and overdue":

Premature because when you're in the middle of a forest fire you can have no sensible idea of how it will eventually burn out. Overdue, because the flames have been raging for 15 years now and it's excellent that the BBC is at last sticking a dampened finger in the air to see which direction the wind is blowing.

For The Times, Andrew Billen gave the first episode three out of five, saying that Krotoski "offered paradox and dialectic before reaching her bland conclusion that the web was constantly re-inventing itself". The Guardian's Tim Dowling said that the first episode "made a better fist of it than most" and that "the contributors struck a nice balance between big name cheerleaders and glowering dissenters". He described Krotoski as "convincingly authoritative" but found that "the big picture was sometimes hard to hold in your head" and "the term 'empowering tool' was deployed frequently but without enlightenment". Ryan Lambie for Den of Geek said that "the phrases 'empowering tool' and 'ultimate leveller' are repeated far too many times" and that "the programme's makers apparently assume that the average viewer has never seen or used the Internet in their life", but felt Krotoski was "engaging and enthusiastic" as host, however "her constant presence in every other shot is strangely distracting". The Scotsman's Paul Whitelaw, who also said the camera was "fixated on Krotoski", felt the first programme was a "disjointed essay which proved fascinating when focusing on the origins of the web, but less so when dealing with more recent and familiar developments".

The series won the 2010 Digital Emmy for Best Digital Program: Non-Fiction and the 2010 BAFTA award for New Media.

== See also ==
- Hyperland – 1990 BBC documentary written and presented by Douglas Adams, which foreshadowed many aspects of the modern internet.
- Google and the World Brain, 2013 BBC-assisted documentary about Google's efforts on scanning all the books in the world
