= Vahid Online =

Iranian blogger

- Occupation: bloggers

Vahid Online (Persian: وحيد آنلاين) is the pseudonym of an Iranian blogger, netizen, Internet activist and Internet celebrity who is one of the most followed Iranians on almost any social network. He is a news geek and is considered by many of his followers as the source for daily news and information.

== Activism ==
Days before the 2009 presidential election, Vahid Online was present in Mir-Hossein Mousavi campaign headquarters in Gheytarieh, when the place was rushed by government militias. Witnessing the event, he immediately posted it on his blog and social media accounts, and used his mobile phone to broadcast live footage on Qik. Within a few hours, 8,000 users watched the video online and it went nationwide when it was shown on BBC Persian evening news. By that time, his social media posts acted as a source of information for the media outside Iran regarding the developments inside the country. After he was tracked down for his activities, he moved into hideout, and later escaped Iran to Turkey with the help of smugglers before settling in the United States as a refugee.

Google Plus' former policy of not allowing pseudonyms for users, forced Vahid Online to deactivate his account. However, after Google was convinced that this is an "established" pseudonym and he has a "meaningful following", gave his account back.

=== News events coverage ===
Vahid Online runs a Telegram channel and a Twitter account through which he actively monitors what circulates in social media to cover newsworthy events regarding Iran. He posts content that he aggregates and verifies for other Iranians and the broader world, as relied on and covered by respected outlets. Some recent significant instances include firsthand videos from 2017 and 2019 nationwide protests, or images and films revealing about coronavirus casualties in the country that the government tended to withhold from the public since the beginning of the outbreak.

== Views ==
Vahid Online has challenged validity of the 'Twitter Revolution' thesis and Douglas Rushkoff's view on role of social media in 2009 poll presidential election protests, believing them to be "exaggerated".

He believes that blocking access to online products in Iran by companies like Google, mirrors the policies of Internet censorship in Iran by the government.

Commenting on Javad Zarif's presence in social media, he was quoted, "Zarif is the first senior Iranian official to type with his own fingers and write that he is using Facebook, a site that has been branded as a tool of enemies and mentioned in trials of opposition members" and "People have gotten used to the government's stance on Facebook, and now they're hoping that with the presence of the foreign minister, the site will become unfiltered".

== Awards ==
Vahid Online was awarded The BOBs citizen journalism people's choice award in 2016, and best person to follow Persian in 2013.

== See also ==
- Persiankiwi
