= Ben Hammersley =

British journalist (born 1976)

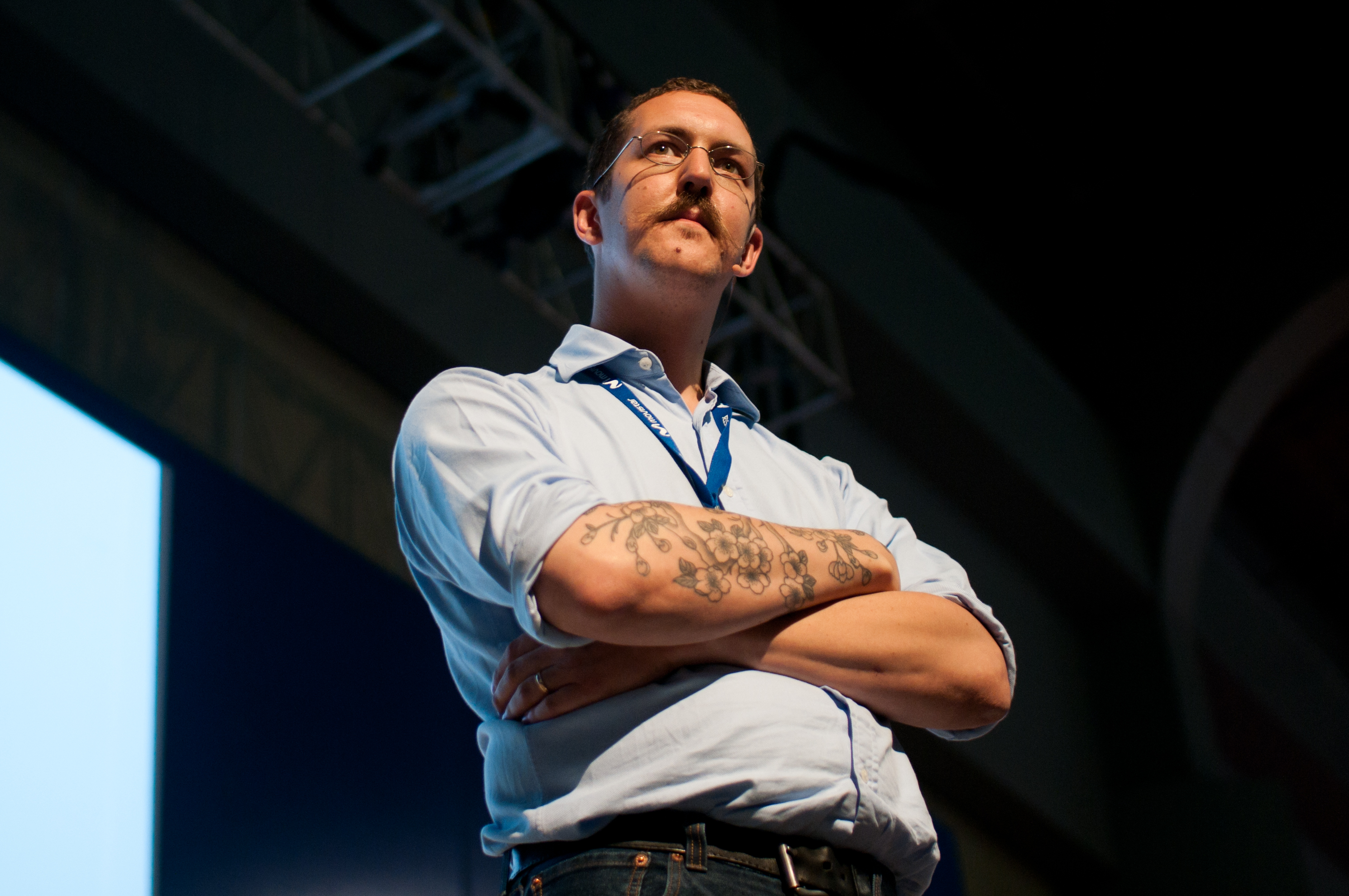
- Hammersley in 2019
- Born: 3 April 1976 (age 50); Leicester, England
- Occupations: Technologist, Futurist, Strategic Forecasting Consultant, Journalist
- Spouse: Aleks Krotoski
- Children: One
- Website: www.benhammersley.com

Ben Hammersley (born 3 April 1976) is a British consultant, broadcaster, and systems developer.

== Education ==
Hammersley is the eldest of three children and was educated at Loughborough Grammar School, and the School of Oriental and African Studies, from which he dropped out after a year.

== Technology and strategic forecasting ==
Ben Hammersley has given keynote presentations to corporates and large events internationally. Until 2013, he was the UK Prime Minister's Ambassador to East London Tech City.

== Multimedia reporting and broadcasting ==
In 2015, Hammersley presented a six-part BBC World News series on cybercrimes. He has twice presented on BBC Radio 4's documentary strand Analysis, covering Facebook in November 2007, and personal genetic testing in December 2008. He also presented the five-part BBC series Futureproof Yourself.

Hammersley previously worked as an internet reporter for The Times. He was Associate Editor and Editor-at-Large at the launch of the UK edition of Conde Nast's Wired UK magazine.

In 2006, he pioneered multi-platform journalism for The Guardian covering conflict in Afghanistan, and in 2007 also for the BBC covering the election in Turkey. He later used the systems he developed to build The Guardian's pioneering range of blogs, including the award-winning Comment is Free.

== Podcast ==
Hammersley coined the term podcast in an article he wrote for The Guardian in 2004. It was declared "Word of the Year" by the New Oxford American Dictionary in 2005. Hammersley has said that he made the word up to pad out an article he was writing that was a little too short.

== Fellowships and associations ==
Hammersley is a member of the Transatlantic Network 2020, and a trustee of the London chapter of the Awesome Foundation. In August 2011 he was made a fellow of the UNAOC. He is a judge of the Lovie Awards.

In 2013, Hammersley became a fellow of the Robert Schuman School for Advanced Studies at the European University Institute, Innovator-in-Residence at the Centre for Creative and Social Technologies at Goldsmiths, University of London, a member of the European Commission High Level Expert Group on Media Freedom, and a non-resident fellow of the Brookings Institution.

== Personal life ==
Hammersley is married to Aleks Krotoski, with whom he has a daughter. Hammersley is a pilot, an Emergency medical technician and Wilderness Medic, a triathlete and ultra-runner, a diver, photographer, and disaster response volunteer.

== Bibliography ==
Hammersley has authored or co-authored several books on technology and journalism.
