= Quake (series) =

Video game series by id Software

- Genre: First-person shooter
- Developers: id Software; Raven Software; Hyperion Entertainment; Bullfrog Productions; Lobotomy Software; Raster Productions; Hammerhead
- Publisher: GT Interactive (1996–1997); Activision (1997–2009); Electronic Arts (2001) (Quake III Revolution); Electronic Arts Square (2001) (Quake III Revolution Japanese version); Bethesda Softworks (2010–present); Nvidia (2019) (Quake II RTX) Other: Softbank Macmillan Digital Publishing USA ClickBOOM Sega Midway Games Roadshow New Media MacSoft Loki Software Tsukuda Original MediaQuest
- Platforms: MS-DOS, Windows, OS X, Linux, Sega Saturn, Nintendo 64, PlayStation, PlayStation 2, Xbox 360, PlayStation 3, Dreamcast, Nintendo Switch, PlayStation 4, PlayStation 5, Xbox One, Xbox Series X/S
- First release: Quake; June 22, 1996
- Latest release: Quake Champions; August 22, 2017

Quake is a series of first-person shooter video games, developed by id Software and, as of 2010, published by Bethesda Softworks. The series is composed of Quake and its nonlinear, standalone sequels, which vary in setting and plot.

Quake was created as a successor franchise to id's highly successful Doom series, which had begun in 1993. As a new series, it built upon the fast-paced gameplay, game engine, and 3D graphics capabilities of Doom. It also expanded upon the multiplayer capabilities of Doom by introducing online multiplayer over the internet. This contributed to the popularity of the Quake series and characterized it as a figurehead in online gaming. By 2009, the series sold more than 5 million copies.

== Games ==
Release timeline
1996	Quake
1997	I: Scourge of Armagon
1997	I: Dissolution of Eternity
1997	Quake II
1998	II: The Reckoning
1998	II: Ground Zero
1999	Quake III Arena
2000	III: Team Arena
2001
2002
2003
2004
2005	Quake 4
2006
2007	Enemy Territory: Quake Wars
2008
2009
2010	Quake Live
2011
2012
2013
2014
2015
2016	I: Dimension of the Past
2017
2018
2019
2020
2021	I: Dimension of the Machine
2022	Quake Champions
2023	II: Call of the Machine
2024
2025
2026	I: Dawn of the Machine

Every game in the Quake franchise shares a basis in first-person shooter gameplay. However, the series lacks a singular narrative across all of its entries. Two major storylines exist within the franchise, as well as the Arena series, which focuses primarily on multiplayer gameplay.

=== Original storyline ===
The game's original plot focused on the player character, later known as "Ranger" in Quake III Arena, who travels across alternate dimensions to stop an enemy code-named "Quake". The game takes place in a Lovecraftian setting with a mixture of dark fantasy, pseudo-medieval, and science fiction elements.

- Quake (1996)
  - Quake Mission Pack No. 1: Scourge of Armagon (1997)
  - Quake Mission Pack No. 2: Dissolution of Eternity (1997)
  - Quake: Dimension of the Past (2016)
  - Quake: Dimension of the Machine (2021)
  - Quake: Dawn of the Machine (2026)

=== Quake II storyline ===
Shifting the series to a science fiction theme, Quake II and its sequels chronicle the war between humanity and the cybernetic alien race known as the Strogg.

- Quake II (1997)
  - Quake II Mission Pack: The Reckoning (1998)
  - Quake II Mission Pack: Ground Zero (1998)
  - Call of the Machine (2023; expansion created by MachineGames for the enhanced edition of Quake II)
- Quake 4 (2005)
- Enemy Territory: Quake Wars (2007; a spin-off of the series and a successor to Wolfenstein: Enemy Territory, with a storyline set before the events of Quake II)

=== Arena series ===
Quake III Arena and its successors focus on competitive multiplayer rather than a single-player experience. These games de-emphasized the setting of the first two installments while still retaining continuity with them and crossing over with id's Doom franchise. Quake Champions, in particular, is heavily influenced by the mythology of the original game.

- Quake III Arena (1999)
  - Quake III: Team Arena (2000)
  - Quake Live (2010; an updated version of Quake III Arena originally designed as a free-to-play game launched via a web plug-in)
- Quake Champions (2022)

== Reception ==
Aggregate review scores
Game	GameRankings	Metacritic
Quake	(SAT) 64%	(PC) 94 (N64) 74
Quake Mission Pack No. 1: Scourge of Armagon	(PC) 82%	
Quake Mission Pack No. 2: Dissolution of Eternity	(PC) 83%	
Quake II	(PC) 87% (N64) 81% (PS) 79%	
Quake II Mission Pack: The Reckoning	(PC) 69%	
Quake II Mission Pack: Ground Zero	(PC) 65%	
Quake III Arena	(PC) 83%	(DC) 93 (PS2) 84 (X360) 69
Quake III: Team Arena		(PC) 69
Quake 4		(PC) 81 (X360) 75
Enemy Territory: Quake Wars		(PC) 84 (X360) 69 (PS3) 60

Since its first release, the series has received mostly positive reviews.

Quake, Quake II, and Quake III Arena have all been considered by various video game journalists and magazines to be among the greatest video games of all time.

=== Controversy ===
Like Doom, the Quake series initially received controversy due to containing high amounts of graphic violence. Public and media outcry over Quake and other violent video games peaked after the Columbine High School massacre occurred on April 20, 1999, and it became known that perpetrators Eric Harris and Dylan Klebold were avid players of both Doom and Quake. This finding prompted claims from media outlets that violent video games caused negative psychological effects on children that made them more aggressive and accepting of violence.

id Software co-founder John Romero later stated in a 2013 interview that the company and its developers had never intended to "offend people or shock people" with their games.

== See also ==
- Quake engine - the game engine developed for the original Quake that would become the basis for engines in later entries in the series
- QuakeWorld - an update to id Software's multiplayer deathmatch game, Quake, that enhances the game's multiplayer features
- Doom - id's predecessor franchise to Quake, which began in 1993
- Unreal - a rival franchise developed by Epic Games that began in 1998
