= Aleks Krotoski =

American broadcaster, journalist and social psychologist

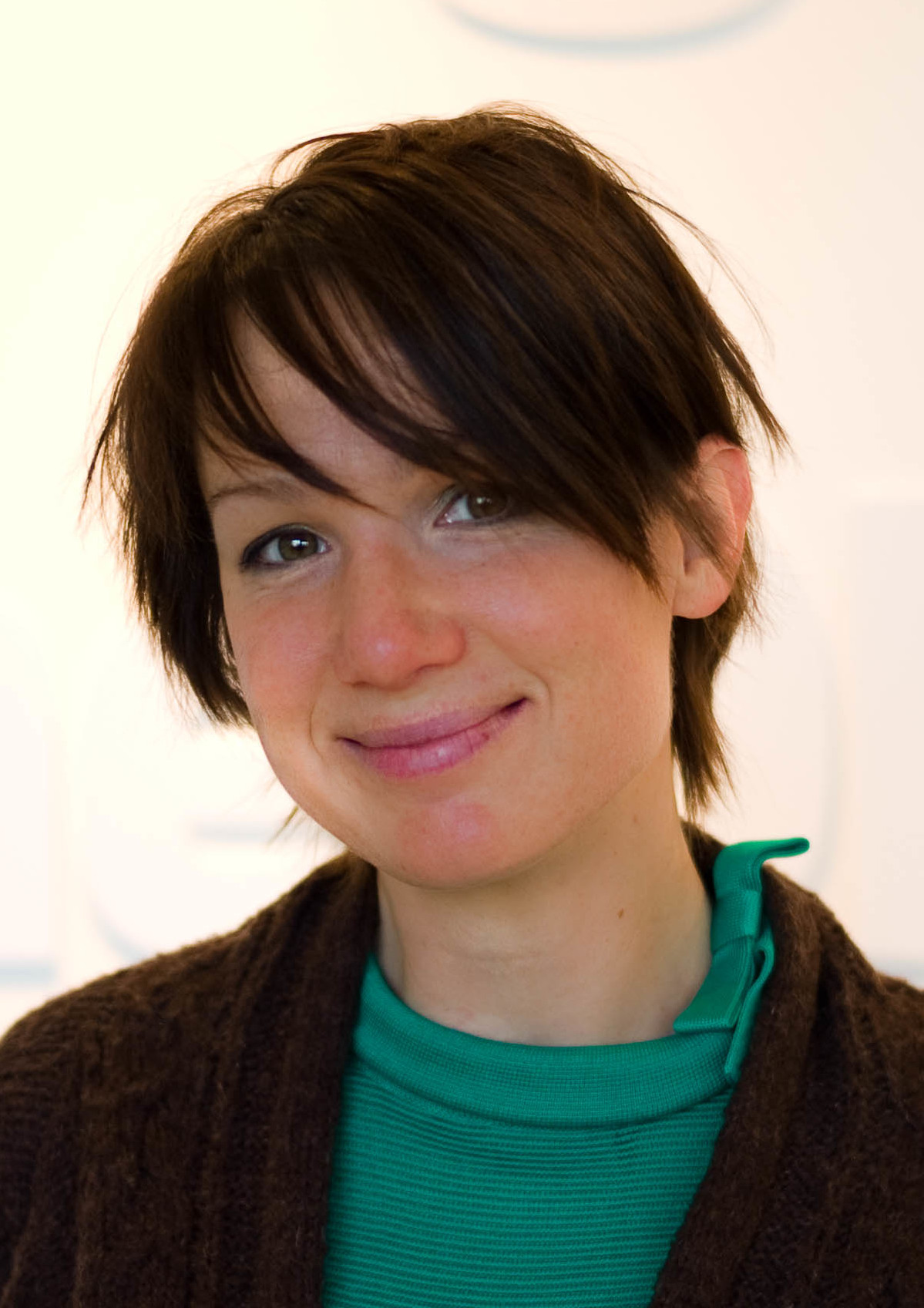
- Krotoski in 2010
- Born: Aleksandra Krystyna Krotoski; October 22, 1974 (age 52)
- Education: PhD in social psychology
- Alma mater: University of Surrey (PhD); Oberlin College
- Occupations: Journalist; Broadcaster; Podcaster
- Employer: The Guardian
- Notable work: The Virtual Revolution
- Partner: Ben Hammersley
- Website: alekskrotoski.com

Aleksandra Krystyna Theresa Krotoski (born October 22, 1974) is an American broadcaster, journalist and social psychologist who writes and broadcasts about social aspects of technology and interactivity. She currently presents the BBC Radio 4 series The Digital Human.

== Early life ==
Krotoski was born a U.S. citizen in Kuala Lumpur, Malaysia, and spent her early years in New Orleans, Louisiana. Her parents, Wojciech Antoni "Al" Krotoski (1937–2016) and his then-wife Danuta (née Gwozdziowski), were Polish-American scientists who played a key role in revealing hypnozoites as the true mechanism of malarial relapse.

== Education ==
Krotoski graduated with a BA in psychology from Oberlin College in Ohio in 1996. After moving to the UK and becoming a television presenter, she returned to university to study social psychology at the University of Surrey, where she completed an MSc in 2004 and a PhD in 2009. Her PhD thesis on social influence in Second Life examined "how information spreads around the social networks of the World Wide Web."

== Career ==
From 1999 to 2001 Krotoski presented the Channel 4 video game show Bits with Emily Booth and Emily Newton Dunn. From 2001 to 2002 presented video game review programme Thumb Bandits with Iain Lee.

In 2006, Krotoski contributed to the United Kingdom's Department for Education and Skills and the Entertainment and Leisure Software Publishers Association (ELSPA) collaboration, "Unlimited Learning: The role of computer and video games in curriculum-based education". In 2004, she wrote ELSPA's "Chicks and Joysticks: An exploration of women and gaming".

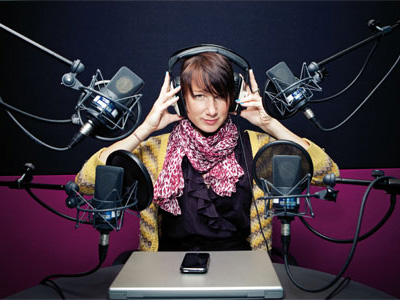
Krotoski in 2011

In September 2006 Krotoski was named one of the games industry's 100 most influential women by NextGen.biz and in November 2006 she was named one of the "Top Ten Girl Geeks" by CNET, two spots behind fictional character Lisa Simpson.

In February 2010, Krotoski presented The Virtual Revolution for BBC Two. This TV documentary series was described by the BBC as charting "two decades of profound change since the invention of the World Wide Web, weighing up the huge benefits and the unforeseen downsides." She also presented an accompanying four-part podcast series on the BBC World Service.

As of November 2010, Krotoski was Researcher in Residence at the British Library and curator of the Growing Knowledge digital exhibition at the library, and a visiting fellow at the London School of Economics.

Krotoski presented the Guardian podcast Tech Weekly and contributes to guardian.co.uk. She formerly contributed occasional stories to The Guardian's now defunct Online print section (which was later renamed Technology), and was one of the core contributor's to the Guardian's original Gamesblog.

Since 2011, Krotoski has presented the BBC Radio 4 series Digital Human, which examines the relationship between human behavior and the use of the World Wide Web. On July 4, 2013, her book Untangling the Web was published. It was based on "thirteen years of research" concurrently with her previous activities. It received reviews in the journal Nature and The Observer.

== Personal life ==
Krotoski married Ben Hammersley in April 2014. Their daughter was born in September 2014.

== Books ==
- The Immortalists: The Death of Death and the Race for Eternal Life. Vintage Publishing. 2025. ISBN 9781847928504.

== See also ==
- Hannah Fry
