= Thumb Bandits =

- Genre: Entertainment
- Presented by: Aleks Krotoski; Iain Lee
- Country of origin: United Kingdom
- Original language: English
- No. of series: 1
- No. of episodes: 15

Production
- Running time: 25 minutes
- Production company: Ideal World Productions

Original release
- Network: Channel 4
- Release: 16 November 2001 – 8 March 2002

Related
- Bits

Thumb Bandits was a video games television show in Britain hosted by Aleks Krotoski and Iain Lee. The program ran in 2001 and 2002 on Channel 4, after the channel's video games show, called Bits.

== Background ==
The program came after Bits, which was another Channel 4 video game show hosted by Krotoski. According to an article in The Guardian from 2009, Thumb Bandits was the follow-up to Bits, though it had a more mature theme.

== Presenters ==
The show was hosted by Aleks Krotoski and Iain Lee, who were both former television and entertainment personalities. Krotoski was formerly a presenter of Bits, while Iain Lee had joined the show after meeting her at a gaming event.

Lee, in an interview with The Guardian in 2008, spoke poorly about his time on Thumb Bandits. He stated that the programme had failed to evolve into what he had envisioned and went on to criticise aspects of its production. However, he also said positive things about Krotoski.

== Reception ==
It was retrospectively reviewed in the context of British video game television. It was mentioned in The Guardian in 2009 in a review of television programmes about video games, where it was described as having a more mature tone than that of its precursor, Bits. The review mentioned that the programme had been aired for 13 episodes.

The Independent in 2005 profiled Lee and mentioned Thumb Bandits as an unsuccessful late night game show that was part of Lee's career in television before returning to Channel 4.

== See also ==
- Bits
- GamesMaster
