= Brink (video game) =

2011 video game

- Developer: Splash Damage (Note: Additional work by Human Head Studios)
- Publisher: Bethesda Softworks
- Directors: Paul Wedgwood; Richard Ham
- Producers: Stephen Gaffney; Griff Jenkins; Chris Dawson
- Designers: Neil Alphonso; Paul Saunders
- Programmer: Arnout van Meer
- Artist: Olivier Leonardi
- Writer: Ed Stern
- Engine: id Tech 4
- Platforms: Microsoft Windows; PlayStation 3; Xbox 360
- Release: NA: 10 May 2011; AU: 12 May 2011; EU: 13 May 2011
- Genre: First-person shooter
- Modes: Single-player, multiplayer

Brink (stylised as BRINK) is a 2011 first-person shooter video game developed by Splash Damage and published by Bethesda Softworks for Microsoft Windows, PlayStation 3 and Xbox 360 in May 2011. In Brink, two factions, Resistance and Security, battle in a once-utopian city called The Ark, a floating city above the waters of a flooded Earth.

Brink has Steamworks integration, including Valve Anti-Cheat. It runs on id Tech 4 and has an updated rendering framework with improved support for multiple CPU cores. Brink is a first-person shooter with a strong focus on parkour-style movement. Online multiplayer servers hold up to 16 players; players can play cooperatively or competitively, or against artificially-intelligent bots.

The game received mixed reviews but was commercially successful. As of 2012, Brink had sold over 2.5 million units and generated around $120–140 million in revenue. The PC version of Brink became free-to-play on 22 August 2017.

== Gameplay ==
Two Resistance characters in the docks area, looking out to The Ark

Splash Damage developed the SMART (Smooth Movement Across Random Terrain) System. By noting a player's position and predicting what they are trying to do, the system automatically navigates complex environments without interaction. By holding down the SMART button, a player will automatically clear obstacles without the need of complex button input from the player, like in Mirror's Edge. SMART automatically mimics adaptive parkour, similar to Prototype.

There are four character classes: Soldier, Medic, Engineer, and Operative. Similar class systems could also be found Splash Damage's previous titles Wolfenstein: Enemy Territory and Enemy Territory: Quake Wars.

- Soldiers: Soldiers are primarily concerned with destroying important objects with explosives. They are also in charge of resupplying their teammates with ammo. Soldiers can also throw damaging speciality grenades, such as molotov cocktails, flashbang, and plant satchel charges similar to C4. With the proper abilities equipped and utilized (Scavenger), they are the only class that have access to a potentially unlimited supply of ammunition.
- Engineers: The Engineer is concerned primarily with building, repairing, and upgrading things on the battlefield. Engineers must also disarm enemy explosives and landmines. They can also upgrade the weapons and body armor of themselves and their teammates, and plant hidden landmines and turrets.
- Medics: Medics revive downed teammates and buff their teammates' health. They also have special health buffs they can dispense to their teammates, such as improving their teammates' metabolism (how fast they heal on the battlefield) or temporarily boosting their sprint speed. They are the only class that can buff their own health or self-resurrect themselves when downed.
- Operatives: Operatives are the spies of Brink. They can hack computers to complete certain Mission Objectives and can also disguise themselves as the enemy. They are the only class that can spot hidden landmines.

Players can customize their loadouts and buy special abilities with experience points, which are earned by completing objectives. The abilities that the player can buy for their character are either "universal" (abilities that the player will be able to use regardless of their class during a mission) and class-specific (abilities that the player can use only when they are in that class). All characters in the beginning will have the "basic kits" of each class so that they can perform the essential objectives only. The class-specific abilities that they buy, however, can enhance their ability and their role in a certain class, potentially making objectives easier to complete and allowing for a greater gain in experience points. The same experience points can be earned in both single-player and multiplayer, adding a special "online bonus" to the player's experience points after completing a mission online. Bethesda claims that players can create a total of 102 quadrillion unique character combinations, if minor variations are factored in.

There are several appearance combinations that a character can have. One of the most significant appearance categories is body type. There are three distinct body types in Brink: heavy, medium, and light, and each have their own positive and negative qualities.

- Heavy body types are very bulky and have significant muscle mass. They can handle all weapons in the game. Their primary weapon can be as powerful as a heavy machine or gatling gun, and their backup weapon can be as powerful as an automatic rifle. Heavy body types also have the highest health. However, they have slowest sprint speed, and their parkour abilities are limited to vaulting over small obstacles that are at waist height or below.
- Medium body types have less muscle mass and are thinner than heavies. They can handle most weapons. Their primary weapon is limited to an automatic rifle, and their backup weapon is limited to a sub-machine gun. A medium's health is lower than heavy body types, but their sprint speeds are much faster and their parkour abilities allow them to clear most obstacles at head height or below.
- Light body types have even less muscle mass and are thinner than mediums. They are also very limited in the weapons they can handle. They are limited to a sub-machine gun for their primary weapon, and their backup weapon is strictly limited to a pistol (however, handling a pistol, regardless of body type or class, will allow the player to use a knife as a far more damaging melee attack). They also have the lowest health. However, they have the fastest sprint speed, and their parkour abilities allow them to wall-hop so that they can clear obstacles at greater speed and reach areas that other body types cannot.

The Squad Commander system gives players context-sensitive objectives. A variety of factors — such as where the player is, how skilled they are, their overall mission progress —determine what objectives will be available. The player can defend one of their faction's command posts or capture an enemy's command post.

There are two types of command posts: health and supply. Each team will have a central command post where reinforcements will start. That command post cannot be captured by the other team and any enemy that tries will be killed by indestructible turrets. However, there will be a few health and supply command posts that can be captured. If a player captures a command post, it will buff all of their teammates' health or supplies. If a player buys certain abilities for their character, then upon capture they can upgrade the command post (an engineer's special ability) or firewall it (an operative's special ability).

An Objective Wheel shows the main objective in yellow and will show a checkpoint which the player will need to go to to achieve that primary objective. The primary objectives are essential to completing the mission. Depending on what side the player is on and what mission the player is doing, there are only a certain amount of primary objectives that you can allow the opposing team to complete before you fail the mission. There are also non-essential secondary objectives, which include capturing an enemy's command post, constructing/destroying a barricade, hacking a door to flank the enemy, or repairing a lift to provide an alternative route. Each player has an objective wheel in their inventory and will, on certain missions, be timed to achieve the goal that must be completed. Each Objective gives experience points upon completion. During Game play the player earns experience and unlocks new abilities/custom gear to put on their custom character.

== Plot ==
Brink takes place in the near future during the mid-21st century on an artificial floating island called the Ark. Built during the 2010s, it was conceived as an environmentally and economically self-sustainable city. However, global warming lead to a dramatic rise in sea levels around the world, causing most of the known land masses to disappear and civilization to collapse. Decades later, the Ark has become a place for refugees coming from all around the world as they view the innovative island as the only suitable place to survive. The Ark is now home to tens of thousands more people than it was originally meant to sustain, and its supposedly renewable resources and technologies are being drained to the limit. Now, the Ark exists in total isolation and has lost contact with the outside world, with many people believing that the entire planet has been completely submerged. Most of the refugees live in tight spaces arranged from wreckage, dealing with extreme poverty and degradation while the original inhabitants of the Ark, the Founders, reside in its luxury districts. These frictions have caused a civil war to begin, between the revolutionary forces of the Resistance and the military troops of the Ark Security.

=== Factions ===
The Resistance is led by Brother Chen, a name that the Resistance affectionately uses for him. Joseph Chen played a significant part in the Ark's design and construction. However, he became angry at the Founders' and Security's decision to ration water and isolate the Ark's refugees from the rest of the island while Security and the Founders live in relative wealth. Chen armed and founded The Resistance, a group of well-trained refugees, and demanded that the Founders share the Ark's resources, and water, equally. The Resistance's goal is to protect refugees from Security forces, distribute Ark's resources to those in need, and to establish contact with the outside world. The Resistance agrees with Chen that the Founders and Ark Security are corrupt and oppressive, and that only the people from the outside world can help them overcome the ever increasing hardships of the Ark's situation.

Ark Security is led by Captain Clinton Mokoena. Security's point of view is very different from that of the Resistance, whom they view as terrorists with dangerous ideas and goals that could eventually destroy the Ark. Ark Security's goals are to stop Chen and his terrorist plots, protect the Ark's remaining resources (and maintain control over them), and to preserve the Founders' vision of a self-sustaining island. Captain Mokoena believes that the rest of the world is in far worse shape than the Ark, and that it would be too dangerous to establish contact with them. At one point in the game, he tells "classified" information to Ark Security, revealing that there is an outside world, and that years ago the Founders sent out Ark representatives to try to make contact with it, only for them to be captured and tortured to death by the outsiders, who wanted to know the Ark's location to raid it.

The player will choose one of these two factions. While each level is the same regardless of the factions for which the player fights, the goals of each side will be different, and the plot-point revolving around each level will be different. For example, in one level, if the player fights for Security, the goal will be to break into a bio-weapons lab and steal a viral bomb that could infect the Ark's inhabitants so that they can launch a counter measure. However, if playing for the Resistance, the goal will be to procure a vaccine from the greedy Founders and Security so that it can distributed fairly among all of the Ark's inhabitants.

Regardless of the player's allegiance, the ending shows the smoking aftermath of the battle between the two factions. Spotting the carnage, a boat driven by outsiders head towards the Ark, as the narrator (revealed to be on the boat, scoping the Ark with a model city), who appeared in the introduction, speaks about the uncertain future of the Ark.

== Release and marketing ==
Bethesda and Splash Damage originally planned to release the game sometime in spring 2009, but pushed it back to fall 2010, before delaying it again. They later announced a release date of 17 May 2011. In April, a month before release, they pulled the release forward a week to 10 May, citing early completion of the game and a desire to get it in players' hands as soon as possible.

=== Pre-order bonuses ===
At QuakeCon 2010, Splash Damage announced Brink's digital pre-order bonuses for several digital retailers in North America as well as Asia. These bonuses will help expand the players starting customization options, with the Doom (GameStop), Fallout (Best Buy), Psycho (Amazon.com and Direct2Drive) and Spec Ops (Walmart and Steam) packs. The "Doom" and "Spec Ops" packs are both available in Nordic retailers. All the pre-order bonuses were later made available to purchase. In the United Kingdom, GAME released a "special edition" which, while costing more than the normal edition, included the Spec Ops and DOOM packs.

Anyone who bought Brink on Steam prior to August 8, 2011 received a cosmetic item based on a character's hood for Team Fortress 2.

=== Agents of Change ===
The first and only downloadable content (DLC) for Brink, released on 3 August 2011 for the Xbox via Xbox Live and 4 August 2011 for the PlayStation 3. The Agents of Change DLC was free on all platforms for the first two weeks of release to stimulate more players into the online servers. After that period, the DLC's price was adjusted to $9.99. The pack contains additional content for the game, including two new maps (along with the relative campaign missions), abilities, attachments for weapons, clothing, and a raised level cap.

=== Free-to-play ===
Six years after its release, Brink became free-to-play on Steam on 22 August 2017.

== Reception ==
Reception

Aggregate score
Aggregator	Score		
Aggregator	PC	PS3	Xbox 360
Metacritic	70/100	72/100	68/100

Review scores
Publication	Score		
Publication	PC	PS3	Xbox 360
Destructoid	N/A	N/A	7.5/10
Eurogamer	N/A	N/A	8/10
Famitsu	N/A	30/40	(360) 33/40; 30/40
Game Informer	6.75/10	6.75/10	6.75/10
GameRevolution	B	B	B
GameSpot	6/10	6/10	6/10
GameSpy	4/5	4/5	4/5
GameTrailers	N/A	N/A	7.9/10
Giant Bomb	N/A	N/A	2/5
IGN	6/10	6/10	6/10
Joystiq	N/A	N/A	2/5
Official Xbox Magazine (US)	N/A	N/A	4.5/10
PC Gamer (US)	60%	N/A	N/A
PlayStation: The Official Magazine	N/A	6/10	N/A
The Escapist	N/A	N/A	4/5
Metro	N/A	N/A	5/10

Brink received "mixed or average" reviews on all platforms according to the review aggregation website Metacritic. In Japan, where the Xbox 360 version was ported for release on 16 June 2011, followed by the PlayStation 3 version on 14 July 2011, Famitsu gave the game a score of 30 out of 40, while Famitsu X360 gave the former version each a score of two eights, one nine, and one eight.

Eurogamer said the Xbox 360 version was "an exceptional team shooter, smart, supremely well balanced and with a unique, exciting art style." GameSpy said, "Brink has the potential to become your new favorite FPS." The Guardian gave the same console version four stars out of five and praised it by saying, "Brink deserves to be ranked among the finest co-op games available."

The game was also criticized for being incomplete or unpolished, with GamePro giving the Xbox 360 version three-and-a-half stars out of five, saying, "Brink is about two or three updates from being one of my favorite shooters of all time, but I'm not reviewing the game I want it to be. I'm reviewing the game that it is, and what it is something just short of being the awesome experience that I want." Game Informer criticized the single-player experience and said, "Brink is not a bad game. If Splash Damage can stabilize the performance and fix some glaring omissions (like a pre-game lobby) with a patch, I'd gladly spend more time with it. But with only eight multiplayer maps, 20 progression levels, no clan support, and average gunplay, it's not a good value proposition."

Some reviews were very critical. Joystiq said of the Xbox 360 version, "Brink's artistically compelling soldiers can sail effortlessly over obstacles, landing acrobatic maneuvers never before seen in the genre with effortless poise—unfortunately, just about everything else lands flat on its face." 1Up.com said of the same console version, "Brink is unfinished. And that doesn't mean it's full of technical problems. Well, it's got those too. But mostly, it's just an unpolished, poorly executed mess of ideas." Giant Bomb's Jeff Gerstmann said of the same console version, "Flat combat and a lack of variety are just two of the things that make Brink such a disappointment."

GameZone gave the game eight out of ten, saying, "Brink is a multiplayer game[,] plain and simple, and going about it solo completely defeats the purpose it was made for. Jump in, meet some people, and work hard to tear apart the mechanics and goals of the game. Brink offers an incredibly satisfying multiplayer experience. Playing any other way is not worth your time." The Daily Telegraph gave the same console version eight out of ten, saying, "If Brink grabs you, it'll grab you hard. Even though the lack of polish is at times a disappointment, beneath the occasional annoyance is a fantastic and refreshing shooter that offers something different to the norm. It's standing on the precipice of true brilliance." However, Edge gave the same console version six out of ten, saying, "Brink is not revolution. It might not even be evolution of the kind the FPS needs. If anything, it's an ideas board: a fun enough game in the short-term, but more valuable in the long run to better and brighter thieves."

The A.V. Club gave the same Xbox 360 version a B+, saying, "Combat is consistently and gratifyingly chaotic, as the objective system organically builds choke points, and maps reward (or require) a good range of classes. Still, the game isn't frustration-free: Bulk, unlike class, can't be adjusted on the fly, escort missions are ludicrous, and the soldier class is underpowered. But a combination of good looks, heavy customization, and frenetic, fluid gameplay gives Brink the edge." The Escapist gave the same console version four stars out of five, saying, "I like Brink quite a bit, but it's definitely not for everyone. The cumbersome interface is the antithesis of the modern streamlined shooter. If you can get past all the obstacles the game puts in your way, there's a lot of fun to be had here." However, Metro gave the same console version five out of ten, saying, "There are some innovative ideas here but poor balancing, restrictive matchmaking and too little content overwhelm the positives."
