= Leyou =

Chinese video game holding company

Leyou Technologies Holdings Limited
- Formerly: Sumpo Food Holdings Limited (2010–2015)
- Type: Subsidiary
- Industry: Video games
- Founded: 22 February 2010; 16 years ago
- Founder: Lin Qinglin
- Headquarters: Lippo Centre, Hong Kong, China
- Parent: Tencent (2020–present)
- Subsidiaries: Athlon Games; Digital Extremes; Kingmaker; Radiance Games

Leyou Technologies Holdings Limited (simplified Chinese: 乐游科技控股有限公司; traditional Chinese: 樂遊科技控股有限公司; formerly Sumpo Food Holdings Limited) is a Chinese video game holding company based at Lippo Centre, Admiralty, Hong Kong. Founded in 2010, the company originally dealt with poultry through its subsidiary Fujian Sumpo, which had been founded in 1998. After floating on the Hong Kong Stock Exchange in January 2011, poultry-based income started to fall in 2013. It agreed to buy a majority stake in the video game developer Digital Extremes in October 2014, renamed itself Leyou in January 2015, and completed the acquisition later that year. It acquired Splash Damage in July 2016 before divesting its poultry business in August, majority-acquired Radiance Games and invested in Certain Affinity in 2017, and established Athlon Games in 2018. In December 2020, Leyou was acquired by Tencent.

== History ==
=== Background in poultry (1998–2011) ===
Lin Qinglin founded and became the general manager of Xiamen Xian Wu Modern Office Facilities Operation Company in January 1985 and served until June 1998. The company acted as an agent for fax machines manufactured by Panasonic. During the late 1990s, the Longyan local government encouraged investments in chicken processing operations. Lin had already opened a food shop in Xiamen, which he incorporated as Xiamen Sumpo Group Limited in June 1998. Using the profits from his previous venture, he established the meat production company Sumpo (Longyan) Industrial Co. Ltd. in Longyan in September. Lin oversaw the latter's main business, which dealt with chicken products, animal feed, and chicken seedlings. Among the company's clients were McDonald's, KFC, and Dicos in mainland China. Lin stepped down as the chairman of Sumpo (Longyan) Industrial in March 2003 to focus on the operations of Xiamen Sumpo. His brother, Lin Qingrong, replaced him at Sumpo (Longyan) Industrial, which was renamed Fujian Sumpo Foods Holdings Co., Ltd. in January 2007. In July of that year, Lin Qingrong's Longyan Investment acquired 10% of the company and Lin Qinglin re-assumed its chairman position, which became his primary focus. Subsequently, the company underwent a corporate reorganisation and evolved into a large food processing business, producing 10,000 tons of meat and 180,000 tons of "Sumpo"-branded seed annually. It had a net profit of CN¥57 million in 2009.

On 22 February 2010, Sumpo Food Holdings Limited was incorporated as a holding company in the Cayman Islands, acquiring the outstanding 90% of Fujian Sumpo. It completed an initial public offering on the Hong Kong Stock Exchange in January 2011 at an issue price of HK$0.68 per share. Lin Qinglin, serving as the company's chairman and chief executive officer (CEO), was the principal shareholder at 642 million shares, while his son, Lin Genghua, owned another 167 million. The combined 809 million shares were worth HK$550 million.

=== Entry into video games (2013–2015) ===
Due to increased competition in the animal breeding industry, Sumpo Food Holdings started continuously losing money from 2013. To diversify its business, the company aimed at entering the video game industry. Initially, it attempted to acquire an undisclosed Japanese developer, speculated to be SNK, but was unsuccessful. According to Alex Xu, the chief business officer of the video game company Perfect World, Sumpo Food Holdings was "almost out of business" in early 2014. At the same time, Perfect World was cooperating with and seeking to acquire Digital Extremes, a Canadian video game developer. However, Perfect World was considering delisting itself from the Nasdaq and wanted to avoid pursuing an acquisition using internal funding. At Xu's behest, the company leveraged Sumpo Food Holdings to incrementally acquire Digital Extremes. This move was announced in October 2014, with Sumpo Food Holdings to acquire a 58% stake, while another 3% would be sold to Perfect Online, a subsidiary of Perfect World. The total price for both stakes was US$73.2 million.

In January 2015, Sumpo Food Holdings changed its name to Leyou Technologies Holdings Limited. The acquisition of Digital Extremes' shares was completed in July 2015. By the end of that year, 70% of Leyou's gross profit was generated by its games business, despite 80% of all revenue being generated by its poultry business. The company acquired the remaining 39% in Digital Extremes in May 2016 for US$65 million. In July 2016, via its UK subsidiary Radius Maxima, Leyou acquired three companies: The developer Splash Damage, online back-end technology company Fireteam, and online multiplayer publisher WarChest. All three were previously solely owned by their founder and CEO, Paul Wedgwood.

=== Exit from poultry and acquisition by Tencent (2016–present) ===
During 2016, Perfect World attempted to acquire Leyou, but the deal fell through due to "some difficulties". Leyou divested its entire poultry business in August that year, selling it to Lin Qinglin's wife for CN¥215 million. CP Pokphand Co., which was majority-owned by the Thai food company Charoen Pokphand Foods, subsequently acquired 70% of Fujian Sumpo in October 2016 for CN¥323 million. The previous fiscal year, Fujian Sumpo had revenues of CN¥1.32 billion but made a net loss of CN¥30 million. By 2017, the majority of Leyou's shares had been bought out by a private investor. Xu, who had since left Perfect World for Qihoo 360, was subsequently hired as Leyou's CEO in July 2017.

In July 2017, Leyou invested US$1 million into Chinese developer Guangzhou Radiance Software Technology Co. Ltd. (Radiance Games) to acquire 51% of the company. It announced a US$10 million investment in the American developer Certain Affinity in October, gaining a 20% stake. Leyou launched a publisher, Athlon Games, in California in May 2018. In September that year, Athlon Games and Middle-earth Enterprises agreed for the former to publish a multi-year, online free-to-play game based on The Lord of the Rings. Amazon (through its Amazon Game Studios unit) joined the project in July 2019, agreeing to co-develop and publish the game worldwide, while Leyou would publish it in China and Taiwan. Later that year, Athlon Games became the publisher of Samurai Shodown and a shareholder and publishing partner of LCG Entertainment, which acquired the assets of the defunct Telltale Games.

In 2019, Leyou was reported to be seeking a buyer. iDreamSky (which was 18.6%-owned by the conglomerate Tencent) and CVC Capital Partners offered to acquire Leyou, but the talks stalled due to the COVID-19 pandemic. iDreamSky was met with a competing offer from Zhejiang Century Huatong, which entered into a non-binding merger agreement with Leyou in May 2020. Bloomberg News reported that Sony and Tencent were also interested in bidding for Leyou as of July 2020. By August that year, Tencent appeared to be close to signing a deal to acquire Leyou. The Tencent deal was confirmed by Leyou's shareholders by 11 December 2020 and completed on 23 December 2020. Under the US$1.5 billion agreement, Tencent fully acquired the firm through its subsidiary Image Frame Investment. A dispute between Tencent and Amazon during contract negotiations for the planned The Lord of the Rings game led Amazon to cancel the game's development in April 2021. The acquisition further caused an exodus of Leyou employees, particularly at the Beijing and Shanghai offices. Among them, Xu left in April 2021.

== Athlon Games ==
On May 24, 2018, it was announced by Chinese holding company Leyou that they had formed a new publishing division for PC and consoles called Athlon Games. The company would be based in Los Angeles, California and would help co-publish games with other companies. In September 2018, Leyou had announced that they signed a deal with Middle-earth Enterprises to allow the company to develop and publish an online free-to-play game based on The Lord of the Rings. Amazon Game Studios (a division within Amazon) would join the project in July 2019, and would agree to co-develop and also publish the game globally, with Athlon set to publish the game in China and Taiwan. Later that year Athlon had announced that they had become the publisher of Samurai Shodown excluding in Japan and China, while also becoming a shareholder of LCG Entertainment, a company that had acquired the assets of Telltale Games, while also announcing that they'd become the future co-publisher of all upcoming Telltale titles, starting with the release of Batman: Shadows Edition in December 2019.

On April 17, 2021, after several years in development, Tencent and Amazon had announced that when they had been in contract negotiations for the planned The Lord of the Rings game, a dispute had begun between the two, ultimately causing Amazon to cancel the planned title.
