= RAD Soldiers =

2012 video game

- Developer: Splash Damage
- Publisher: Warchest Ltd.
- Platform: iOS
- Release: December 19, 2012
- Genre: Turn-based strategy
- Mode: Single-player

RAD Soldiers is a turn-based strategy video game developed by Splash Damage and published by Warchest Ltd. for iOS in 2012.

== Reception ==
Reception

Aggregate score
Aggregator	Score
Metacritic	80/100

Review scores
Publication	Score
Gamezebo	3.5/5
MeriStation	7.25/10
Pocket Gamer	4.5/5
Digital Spy	4/5

The game received "favorable" reviews according to the review aggregation website Metacritic.
