= Quake 4 =

2005 video game

- Developer: Raven Software (Note: Ported to Linux by Timothee Besset)
- Publisher: Activision (Note: Mac OS X port developed and published by Aspyr. Re-release published by Bethesda Softworks.)
- Director: Eric Biessman
- Designer: Jim Hughes
- Programmers: Rick Johnson; Jeffrey Newquist
- Artist: Kevin Long
- Composers: Zachary Quarles; Kevin Schilder
- Series: Quake
- Engine: id Tech 4
- Platforms: Windows; Linux; Xbox 360; Mac OS X
- Release: October 18, 2005: Windows; NA: October 18, 2005; AU: October 19, 2005; EU: October 21, 2005; Linux; NA: October 20, 2005; Xbox 360; NA: November 22, 2005; EU: December 2, 2005; AU: March 23, 2006; Mac OS X; EU: March 24, 2006; NA: April 14, 2006
- Genre: First-person shooter
- Modes: Single-player, multiplayer

Quake 4 is a 2005 first-person shooter game developed by Raven Software and published by Activision. It is the fourth title in the Quake series, after the multiplayer Quake III Arena, and a sequel to Quake II. Raven Software collaborated with id Software, who supervised the development of the game as well as provided the id Tech 4 engine upon which it was built. The game has an increased emphasis on single-player gameplay compared to previous installments; its multiplayer mode does not support playable bots.

== Gameplay ==
Quake 4 has a stronger emphasis on single-player than its predecessor, which emphasizes multiplayer gameplay, and features a campaign that continues the story of Quake II. However, it lacks the bot matchmaking offered in Quake III without the use of third-party mods.

Multiplayer modes are Deathmatch, Team Deathmatch, Tourney, Capture the Flag, Arena CTF and DeadZone. Players at QuakeCon reported the multiplayer gameplay to include elements similar to those in previous Quake games such as strafe-jumping or rocket jumping. Notable additions to play are the ability to send shots through the teleporters and the advancement of the game physics provided by the new technology including the ability to bounce grenades and napalm fire off of jump-pads.

Like the previous Quake games, the multiplayer mode has a client-server architecture. The network code has been altered from Doom 3, allowing for larger numbers of players on each server; Doom 3 has a four-player restriction, whereas Quake 4 has a standard 16 player limit.

The player movement in Quake 4 is similar to that in Quake III Arena and Quake Live, but with the additions of ramp jumping and crouch slides. Crouch slides give players the ability to maintain speed by sliding around corners. Ramp jumps allow players to gain extra height from jumping as they reach the top of an inclined object, which while present in the original Quake and Quake II was not included in Quake III Arena.

== Plot ==
Corporal Matthew Kane prepares to take out the Strogg Nexus with his Rail Gun.

The Quake 4 single player mode continues the story of Quake II by pitting the player against cyborg alien race known as the Strogg. The game follows the story of a Marine Corporal named Matthew Kane who is joining the elite Rhino Squad. Following the success of the protagonist of Quake II in destroying the Strogg's leader, the Makron, Rhino Squad is tasked with spearheading the mission to secure the aliens' home planet Stroggos. In the course of the invasion, the squad ship is shot down and crashes in the middle of a battle zone, separating Kane from his companions. Kane rejoins his scattered team members and partakes in the assault against the Strogg.

After performing a number of tasks, such as destroying and capturing Strogg aircraft hangars and defense systems, Kane and his remaining squad members make it to the USS Hannibal. There they are given their next mission: infiltrating one of the Strogg's central communication hubs, the Tetranode, with an electromagnetic pulse bomb in the hope that it will put the main Strogg Nexus in disarray. Kane is tasked with defending the mission convoy, which takes heavy casualties. After many setbacks, including the destruction of the EMP device by a Strogg ambush, Kane is left to complete the mission, assisted only by Private Johann Strauss (Peter Stormare) and Lance Corporal Nikolai "Sledge" Slidjonovitch (Dimitri Diatchenko). Strauss figures out a way to destroy the core by shutting down its coolant systems. As Kane reaches the entrance to the Tetranode, however, he is greeted by two rocket-equipped network guardians, as well as the newly constructed Makron, which easily defeats Kane and knocks him unconscious.

When Kane awakens, he finds himself strapped to a conveyor belt in the Strogg "Medical Facilities", a structure used for turning those captured and killed by the aliens either into protein food or additional Strogg units. In a long and gruesome first-person cutscene, Kane is taken through this "stroggification" process which violently replaces much of his anatomy with bio-mechanical parts. Before the final controlling neurochip implanted in his brain can be activated, though, Rhino Squad bursts into the facility and rescues Kane. After escaping through the Strogg medical facility and Waste Disposal plant, fighting off zombie-like half-stroggified humans along the way, Kane is forced to combat his former commander, Lieutenant Voss (Michael Gannon), who has been fully stroggified into a powerful mechanized monster but retains his own consciousness long enough to warn Kane. After defeating this threat, Kane and the remaining marines finally make it back to the Hannibal.

The commanders realize that Kane's Strogg physiology has opened up new possibilities for defeating the Strogg, as he can be used to infiltrate locations and teleportation areas previously impenetrable and/or fatally harmful to human forces. The new plan is to directly target the Strogg Nexus Core, a huge centralized brain-like structure which controls the alien forces. The Marines are tasked with infiltrating the three data towers adjacent to the Nexus: Data Storage, Processing, and Networking. There, they will deactivate the Nexus' shield and power up the teleporter used to access the Nexus and send Kane in. Once inside, Kane will travel to the center of the Nexus to destroy the Core Brain and its guardian.

After infiltrating the facility and realigning the data nodes powering the teleporter, and destroying its fearsome "Guardian" creature, Kane reaches the Nexus core. There he meets the Makron in a final showdown and kills it. This accomplished, he destroys the Core and returns to the Hannibal. Celebrating with Rhino Squad afterward, Kane receives word that he has new orders.

== Development ==
The Xbox 360 version of Quake 4 was released at the launch of the Xbox 360 and is Xbox Live compatible. There have been major issues with frame rates for the console adaptation, earning it the award for Most Aggravating Frame Rate/Best Slideshow in the GameSpot.com Best and Worst of 2005 list. In addition, the Xbox 360 port of Quake 4 has very long load times and Xbox Live glitches that result in problematic multiplayer experiences, as documented by game review sites as well as on Activision's support pages for the Xbox 360 version. This version was initially priced the same as the PC Special Edition DVD and features the same content. Aspyr Media published and released Quake 4 for OS X on April 5, 2006, initially only for PowerPC based Macs, but later as a universal binary compatible with both PowerPC- and x86-based Macs. id Software continued its tradition of supporting Linux, with Timothee Besset of id releasing a Linux version of the Quake 4 binary executable. The binary could be downloaded for free from id's servers and it requires a licensed copy of Quake 4 for Windows or OS X in order to run. The Linux installer was made available two days after the release of the game itself. The game's budget was $15 million.

Having worked on the theme music for Doom 3, Clint Walsh and Chris Vrenna were hired to work on the theme music for Quake 4. Vrenna produced while Walsh composed the theme music. The rest of the music was composed by Raven's audio leads, Zachary Quarles and Kevin Schilder.

In 2021 the Quake 4 game DLLs were adapted for use with the open source dhewm3 engine derived from the released Doom 3 source code; this has since been used to port the game to AmigaOS.

== Release ==
Quake 4 went gold in early October 2005 and was released on October 18 for Microsoft Windows, and later for Linux, OS X, and Xbox 360.

A "Special DVD Edition" was released, including promotional material and the game Quake II with its expansions The Reckoning and Ground Zero. The Xbox 360 version of Quake 4 is based on the "Special DVD Edition" and includes Quake II. On August 4, 2011, the game was made available through Steam.

Quake 4 was re-released for the Xbox 360 and PC on June 19, 2012, with publication handled by Bethesda. In Europe, the game was launched in the United Kingdom, France, Germany, Switzerland, Austria, and Benelux territories. It was released in the United Kingdom on June 22. Unlike the original Xbox 360 version, the Bethesda re-release does not include the port of Quake II.

== Mods ==
Like its predecessors, Quake 4 can be modified. This led to Quake 4 versions of popular mods from previous versions of Quake, such as Rocket Arena, and Quake 4 Fortress (the Quake 4 version of Team Fortress Classic). Quake 4 Fortress was abandoned before its creators considered it complete; instead they released an alpha version complete with source code. In the competitive gaming scene, there were two principal mods, Q4Max and X-Battle. The online Quake 4 competitive community was split between the two mods. A number of the online leagues switched between X-Battle and Q4Max, such as ClanBase EuroCup and GGL. Despite this split in the online community, the offline professional LAN tournaments run by CPL, ESWC, WCG, QuakeCon, and WSVG all used Q4Max. Members of both the Q4Max and X-Battle teams joined forces with Adam 'SyncError' Pyle of id Software and developed another mod, Delta CTF, which brought Quake II-style Capture the Flag to Quake 4. Another notable mod is SABot, which successfully implemented multiplayer bots in Quake 4 less than a month after the SDK was released, despite this being a feature that some reviewers criticised Quake 4 for not including.

== Reception ==
=== Critical reception ===
Reception

Aggregate scores
Aggregator	Score
GameRankings	PC: 82% X360: 76%
Metacritic	PC: 81/100; X360: 75/100

Review scores
Publication	Score
1Up.com	PC: B− X360: B+
Eurogamer	PC: 7/10; X360: 6/10
GameRevolution	C+
GameSpot	PC: 8.0/10; X360: 6.6/10
GameSpy	PC: 4/5; X360: 3/5
GamesRadar+	3.5/5
GameTrailers	8.9/10
IGN	8.2/10
VideoGamer.com	8/10

Quake 4's PC version received a "Silver" sales award from the Entertainment and Leisure Software Publishers Association (ELSPA), indicating sales of at least 100,000 copies in the United Kingdom.

Quake 4 received generally favorable reviews regarding the PC version of the game, with game database Metacritic giving the game an aggregate review score of 81/100. Websites and magazines such as IGN and UGO praised its single-player campaign, graphics and Hollywood voice-acting, but complained that its multiplayer was too much like Quake III's. GameSpot gave Quake 4 an 8.0 and it also said: "The single-player is great fun, but the uninspired multiplayer leaves a lot to be desired". PC Magazine gave Quake 4 a good review for both singleplayer and multiplayer gameplay.

The original 2005 Xbox 360 version of the game fared slightly worse with critics when it was released but still received generally positive reviews, scoring 75/100 on Metacritic. The only exception for that is 1UP.com, where they gave the PC version a score of "B−" but the Xbox 360 version a score of "B+". Electronic Gaming Monthly gave a mixed rating to the Xbox 360 port. It panned the single-player campaign for not being creative enough to compete with other games such as Half-Life 2 and noted that the game ran poorly on the 360. IGN scored Quake 4 8.1/10, saying "Quake 4 is one of those games that will appeal to console gamers who haven't owned a PC for years. The single-player campaign is varied and pretty interesting, getting better after you're Stroggified. The enemies go from dumb and running right at you to diverse and more interesting in the second half of the game, and there are a few cool boss fights worth your while. The gory graphics and excellent lighting are well done and they'll appeal to many gamers looking for a fast, shiny game to just let loose on". GameSpot gave it a worse rating than the PC version, 6.6, with the review reading "There's a good game in Quake 4, but it's buried under several layers of highly disappointing graphical performance issues". The website would later give the port in its year-end awards "Most Aggravating Frame Rate / Best Slideshow", highlighting how the game tended to suffer severe slowdown. X-Play gave the Xbox 360 version a 3/5 and the PC version a 4/5.

Quake 4 was a finalist for PC Gamer US's "Best Multiplayer Game 2005" award, which ultimately went to Battlefield 2.

=== Competitive play ===
In part due to the similarities to the Quake III Arena multiplayer, Quake 4 was used in a number of professional electronic sports tournaments.

The following competitions have held Quake 4 events:

- Cyberathlete Professional League (2005)
- Electronic Sports World Cup (2006 / 2007)
- QuakeCon (2005–2007)
- World Cyber Games (2006)
- World Series of Video Games (2006 / 2007)
