= Emily Newton Dunn =

British television presenter

- Born: 1972 (age 53–54); England
- Occupations: Television presenter, video game designer

Emily Newton Dunn (born 1972) is an English television presenter, video game designer, and producer.

== Career ==
She co-presented the Channel 4 TV programme Bits with Aleks Krotoski and Emily Booth. Since leaving television presenting, she began working in her video games career for Criterion Games. She later worked for Electronic Arts as part of EA Bright Light as both a designer and producer, working on games such as Harry Potter and the Half-Blood Prince.

== Works ==
| Year | Title | Roles |
|---|---|---|
| 1999 | Bits | Writer |
| 2001 | Lara Croft: Lethal and Loaded | Self |
| 2002 | Saiko Exciting | Self-hoster |
| 2003 | Ultimate Gamer | Self-presenter |
| 2005 | Burnout Revenge | Producer |
| 2008 | Burnout Paradise | Additional Producer |
| 2009 | Harry Potter and the Half Blood Prince | Designer and producer |
| 2009 | Charm Girls Club: Pajama Party | Design Consultant |
| 2009 | Need for Speed: Shift | Designer |
| 2010 | Create | Designer |
| 2022 | Dreams | Senior Principal Systems Designer |
