= Twitter Revolution =

Revolutions and protests that featured the use of X (formerly Twitter)

A Twitter Revolution is a revolution which features the use of the social network Twitter (now X) by protesters and demonstrators in order to communicate.

== Notable revolutions ==
Events known as "Twitter Revolution" include:

- April 2009 Moldovan parliamentary election protests, claiming that the elections, which saw the governing Party of Communists of the Republic of Moldova (PCRM) win a majority of seats, were fraudulent
- 2009 Iranian presidential election protests, also known as Green Revolution and Facebook Revolution, following the 2009 Iranian presidential election

Twitter was also involved in:

- 2010–2011 Tunisian revolution, also known as Jasmine Revolution and Wikileaks Revolution, in which the regime of Zine El Abidine Ben Ali was ended after 23 years
- 2011 Egyptian revolution, in which the regime of Hosni Mubarak was ended after 30 years
- Euromaidan Revolution in Ukraine, beginning in November 2013.
- January 6 United States Capitol attack in 2021, involving rioters supporting United States President Donald Trump's attempts to overturn the 2020 presidential election.

== Characteristics ==
In the "Twitter revolution", the relationship between the new media and social movement has three distinct characteristics:

1. The Twitter streams represent the interaction mechanism of ecological network;
2. The Twitter streams embedding or be embedded into different types of control process;
3. The Twitter streams reflect the change of social movement ecology.

== Positive influence ==
According to the study of the Egyptian revolution, American Scholar Linz put forward that there are four ways affect collective action:

1. Make the disgruntled citizens more coordinated take some public action;
2. through the information cascade (information cascades) to improve the predictive chance of success
3. accelerate the cost of the repression of the union movement.
4. Through information dissemination increase the other regional and global public attention.

== Negative influence ==
Twitter revolutions can also have a negative influence on the social movement. Malcolm Gladwell defined the SNS activity as weak ties and low level organization structure, and put forward that the social relations constructed through the Internet is very difficult to translate into collective action. Additionally, It is a challenge of the social practice of using social media for political information construction and dissemination of democratic consultation; therefore, political culture, and social participation of ideological discourse problems created by the social media becomes very important. Twitter analysis tools is played an important role in getting word about the events in Iran out to the wider world. Together with YouTube, it helped focus the world's attention on the Iranian people's fight for democracy and human rights. New media over the last year created and sustained unprecedented international moral solidarity with the Iranian struggle—a struggle that was being waged many years before Twitter was ever conceived. Thirdly, as the restrictions of the technical and social capital, minority voices are easy to be ignored, and thus, the discourse right of ordinary audience was again put on the agenda.

== Case studies ==
=== In Iran ===
"Twitter revolution" is distinguished from other forms of activism because of the means by which the activists communicate and aggregate through Twitter. It is an example of how social media facilitates communication among people globally in political revolutions. It challenges the traditional relationship between political authorities and popular, allowing the powerless to "collaborate, coordinate, and give voice to their concerns".

During the 2009–2010 Iranian election protests, Twitter and other similar websites succeeded in spreading the information and let people know around the world what was going on in Iran, while the mainstream, western media such as CNN failed to cover the news. According to Evgeny Morozov, a scholar at Stanford and a blogger for Foreign Policy magazine, the widespread belief that Twitter was the major platform of Iranian youth to plan mass scale protests online lacks sufficient supporting evidence, because in this way the authorities would be able to monitor and suppress the movement. Instead, Twitter is mainly "used to publicize protests that are already going on—and bring the world's attention to the acts of violence committed by the regime".

Here, Twitter had played a role beyond its intended function as social media where people get connected to their acquaintances and friends online. "Without Twitter the people of Iran would not have felt empowered and confident to stand up for freedom and democracy", Mark Pfeifle, a former national-security adviser wrote. The contribution of Twitter in disseminating news from Green Revolution is recognized by Obama administration. On June 15 afternoon, the State Department official Jared Cohen sent Twitter an email, requesting it to "delay scheduled maintenance of its global network, which would have cut off service while Iranians were using Twitter to swap information and inform the outside world about the mushrooming protests around Tehran".

The Iranian government also chose to block websites Facebook and Twitter roughly a month prior the June 12 presidential elections.

However, some scholars also doubt the significance of Twitter's role in the political upheaval. Golnaz Esfandiari wrote in Foreign Policy magazine that the majority of Twitter posts concerning demonstrations were products of Western users: "It's time to get Twitter's role in the events in the Iran right. Simply put: there was no Twitter Revolution inside Iran." She claims that bloggers like Andrew Sullivan, who was famous for his tweets about the Tehran revolution, misunderstood the situation. This journalist argues that activists who were opposed to the main political power tended to use Internet sources like text messages, email, and blog posts for communication in organizing of protest actions. Meanwhile, "good old-fashioned word of mouth" was the most influential medium for coordinating opposition, she writes. Esfandiari also added that social media tools like Facebook and Twitter were not ideal for rapid communication among protestors. "Western journalists who couldn't reach—or didn't bother reaching?—people on the ground in Iran simply scrolled through the English-language tweets post with tag #iranelection", she wrote. "Through it all, no one seemed to wonder why people trying to coordinate protests in Iran would be writing in any language other than Farsi." So from the Western point of view, the voices of native Iranians writing tweets in Persian about the situation in their country were nearly absent. Evgeny Morozov stresses the importance of event coverage by bilingual Iranian bloggers. In his opinion only the people who were deeply involved in the process could comprehensibly describe the current situation—Western commentators didn't clearly understand the real situation because of language barriers, and only a small percentage of curious and demanding commentators tried to use translators to get to the root of the problem.

David Rothkopf proposes that the idea of "Twitter revolution" is an overstatement. Even though it raised political awareness and increase participation through retweeting and reposting, there is no involvement of sacrifice, courage, physical confrontation and risk that real revolutions and real changes require.

Iranian activist Vahid Online questions the "Twitter revolution" idea, stating that access to Facebook and Twitter in Iran is not enough to make it happen.

=== In Egypt ===
During the Egypt Revolution of 2011, the oppositional movement against the ruling of Mubarak was active on various platforms of social media. For example, "the hashtag #Jan25th was used to mobilize protesters on Twitter" to join the demonstration on Jan 25th on Tahrir Square. Along with other methods such as text messages, flyers and word-of-mouth, it drew a crowd of 80,000 to the street of Cairo on that day. Similar to its Iranian correspondent, Egypt government shut down access to Twitter in the afternoon on the day of gathering. The connection was not restored until February 2.

Moreover, Twitter was applied to communicate with the audience outside Egypt to "globalized the movement and win international support to protect and sustain the uprising". The worldwide audience was also able to have constant update with the situation in Egypt besides simply listening to the State's point of view. As a consequence, the revolution succeeded in the resignation of Mubarak on February 11, ending the dictatorship that lasted for over three decades. An article in the magazine Wired states that social media did not cause the Egypt revolution. Rather, Twitter and Facebook were more like "a spark and an accelerant", "catalyzing pro-democracy movements". They have had the most potent impact in "what has shocked most observers of the current Egyptian scene: the sheer speed with which the regime fell – 18 days".

In Egypt, Twitter was furthermore used to launch movements and volunteer groups hoping to have a positive effect on the community during a volatile time. The most notable initiatives launched on Twitter are Tahrir Supplies, Tahrir Doctors and Tahrir Bodyguard. Tahir Supplies and Tahrir Doctors aimed to save lives through collecting supplies, disseminating emergency alerts and were both effective in developing a logistics network to handle medical emergencies in Tahrir Square. Tahrir Bodyguard was launched by Soraya Bahgat on Twitter to combat the mob sexual assaults in Tahrir Square. Soraya Bahgat founded the movement after being horrified by the stories of ongoing mob sexual assaults in Tahrir Square as a movement of uniformed volunteers taking a stand against these assaults. Inspired by Twitter's effectiveness as a launching pad for initiatives such as Tahrir Supplies and Tahrir Doctors, she immediately took to Twitter after getting the idea and created the account that launched the movement. "Unwilling to see more of these assaults taking place, she started a Twitter account asking for volunteers to join and help make Tahrir a safer place for women", a member of the movement explained in an interview.

=== In Ukraine (Euromaidan) ===
After president Viktor Yanukovich rejected the signing of the EU–Ukraine agreement on November 21, 2013, a mass protest took place on the Independence square in Kyiv. The event was massively spread through Twitter with the hashtags #euromaidan, #євромайдан and #евромайдан. The political situation in Ukraine increased the Twitter subscribers from 6,000 new accounts in November 2013 to 55,000 in January 2014. The average amount of daily tweets grew from 90,000 in 2012 to 130,000 during the protests. It reached a peak on 20 February 2014, when dozens of protesters were killed. The same day, 240,000 tweets were written. Although many of the tweets were written in English, according to geotags analysis, 69% of them were tweeted from Ukraine. This indicates that those tweets were posted mostly by Ukrainians themselves. On the 27th of January, 2014 a 'Twitterstorm' was launched in order to attract global attention to the protest itself and to initiate sanctions towards the then president Viktor Yanukovich. Ukrainian Twitterati addressed tweets with the hashtag #digitalmaidan to foreign media, politicians and international organizations. The hashtag then topped worldwide Twitter trends. Ukrainians might have been influenced to use Twitter under the Euromaidan because of the impact Twitter had for other protests.

=== In Tunisia ===
The Tunisian Revolution was sparked in December 2010 due to a lack of political freedoms and poor living conditions. "The protest was driven by the suicide of Mohamed Bouazizi, an unemployed street vendor whose informal vegetable stall was shuttered by the police." Because of these conditions many of the Tunisian people took to social media sites, such as Twitter, to spread their messages about the revolution. One of the messages spread through Twitter included a popular hashtag #sidibouzid, which was important in highlighting the Tunisian Revolution through a hashtag.

In a survey conducted about social media use in the Tunisian revolution, "many of the respondents named Twitter, Facebook, Skype, and cell phones as social media platforms they were using. Prior to the revolution most of the respondents stated that they were using social media to exchange information, stay in contact with family, and receive uncensored news. During the revolution, the respondents expressed an increased use of social media."

Furthermore, the Tunisian people spread videos and photos of violence taking place in the country at the time. This allowed for people outside of Tunisia to understand what was taking place in Tunisia during the revolution. This led to increased coverage of the events from outside the country, which helped spread awareness and ultimately help the people of Tunisia see their former President Zine El Abidine Ben Ali.
