= BarrysWorld =

BarrysWorld was a British multiplayer gaming website which hosted servers for various video game titles. It collapsed late in 2001.

== History ==
Originally run by a volunteer organisation, during the late 1990s and early 2000s it ran a multitude of servers for popular multiplayer games of the time including: Counter-Strike, Half-Life, Quake, Quake II, Quake III, Starsiege: Tribes, Tribes 2, Team Fortress and Unreal Tournament. The website and its multiplayer servers were launched in March 1998, having evolved from several 'clan' servers previously operated by the website's creators.

Around the year 1999, it started offering a pay-per-use modem dial-up service and along with supporting the free multi-player services and website, propelled Barrysworld to being the 4th largest internet service provider (ISP) in the UK (based on call minutes per month).

While the website and free multiplayer servers proved popular, with a claimed 300,000 registered users, the organisation behind the website struggled at times to find funds for the hardware and bandwidth required to support such a service.

As cheap flat-rate narrow-band and broadband services from more mainstream ISPs became popular and the dot com crash made venture capitalists apprehensive about funding such organizations, Barrysworld once again struggled to find funds to support its activities. While the organisation tried to support the service by offering game servers and (non-compulsory) subscriptions, by 2001 the funding crisis had forced the organisation, which by now had 35 staff, into voluntary liquidation.

It is not about the failure of anyone here […] the stock market has tarnished anything that's vaguely internet or game-related as a dead loss.

— Ade Brownlow

The venture capital company 3i had provided £1m, and guaranteed that a further £2m would be forthcoming. The company GAME.net bought the website and its assets soon after, and for the next couple of years ran the website and multiplayer service in a similar manner, hoping the multiplayer service would promote its products.

In 2003 the original creators of Barrysworld parted ways from the GAME.net company and relaunched the service supported by a volunteer based organisation using a new website https://www.freddyshouse.com .

The name Barrysworld is a reference to the character Barry the Time Sprout in novels by Robert Rankin
