= Enemy Territory: Quake Wars =

2007 video game

- Developer: Splash Damage (Note: Nerve Software ported the game to the Xbox 360, and Underground Development developed the PlayStation 3 version.)
- Publisher: Activision
- Director: Paul Wedgwood
- Producers: Kevin Cloud; Neil Postlethwaite
- Designers: Matt Wilson; Mark Fry
- Programmers: John Carmack; Arnout van Meer
- Artists: Richard Jolly; Francis Hobbins; Peter Boehme
- Composer: Bill Brown
- Series: Quake
- Engine: id Tech 4
- Platforms: Windows; Linux; Mac OS X PlayStation 3 Xbox 360
- Release: September 28, 2007: Microsoft Windows; PAL: September 28, 2007; NA: October 2, 2007; Linux; WW: October 19, 2007; Mac OS X; NA: March 18, 2008; EU: April 24, 2008; PlayStation 3 & Xbox 360; NA: May 27, 2008; EU: May 30, 2008; AU: June 6, 2008
- Genres: First-person shooter, real-time strategy
- Mode: Multiplayer

Enemy Territory: Quake Wars is a 2007 first-person shooter video game developed by Splash Damage and published by Activision for Microsoft Windows, Linux, Mac OS X, PlayStation 3 and Xbox 360. The game was first released in the PAL region on September 28, 2007, and later in North America on October 2. It is a spinoff of the Quake series and the successor to 2003's Wolfenstein: Enemy Territory.

Quake Wars is a prequel set in the same universe as Quake II and Quake 4. New features include the addition of controllable vehicles and aircraft as well as multiple AI deployables, asymmetric teams, much bigger maps and the option of computer-controlled bot opponents. Unlike Wolfenstein: Enemy Territory, Quake Wars is a commercial release rather than a free download.

Enemy Territory: Quake Wars received positive reviews upon release, with a more mixed reception for the console versions. Since 2011, the rights to the game have reverted to ZeniMax Media.

== Gameplay ==
Quake Wars is a class-based, objective focused, team-oriented game. Teams are based on human (GDF) and alien (Strogg) technology. While the teams are asymmetrical, both sides have the same basic weapons and tools to complete objectives. Unlike other team-based online games (such as the Battlefield series), the gameplay is much more focused on one or two main objectives at once, rather than spread all over the combat area. This allows for much more focused and intense combat situations, similar to the original Unreal Tournament assault mode.

Each player class normally has new objectives show up during game play, many times based around the specific capabilities of that class. The game also has the capability to group players into fireteams for greater coordinated strategy. These fireteams can be user created or game generated depending on the mission selected by the player.

The game has an experience points (XP) rewards system in place, which rewards every player some points depending on the mission completed. This accumulated XP later leads to unlocks which may vary from availability of new equipment/weapons to abilities like faster movement or more accurate weapons. These rewards are reset to zero after the completion of every campaign, which consists of three unique maps, all with a common locale/region.

== Development ==
Quake Wars utilizes a modified version of the id Tech 4 engine with the addition of a technology called MegaTexture, a new texture mapping technique developed by John Carmack of id Software. The technology allows maps to be totally unique, without any repeated terrain tiles. Battlefields can be rendered to the horizon without any fogging, with over a square mile of terrain at inch-level detail, while also providing terrain-type detail that defines such factors as bullet hit effects, vehicle traction, sound effects, and so on. Each megatexture is derived from a 32768×32768 pixel image, which takes up around 3 gigabytes in its raw form (with 3 bytes per pixel, one byte for each color channel).

Enemy Territory: Quake Wars was first announced through a press release on May 16, 2005. The public beta opened to FilePlanet paid subscribers on June 20, 2007, and to nonpaying members on three days later. There were also beta keys given out for a limited time exclusively at QuakeCon 2007. The public beta ended on September 25. A second build of the beta was released on August 3. It features a new map entitled Valley to replace Sewer and several changes to the game code to improve performance and implement new features. This map was featured in tutorial videos released prior to the beta, and was the map made available to play at QuakeCon 2006. The Valley map is based on a real Earth location: Yosemite Valley.

A demo for Windows was released on September 10, 2007, and for Linux on October 16, also featuring the map Valley. The full Linux version was released on October 19. A Mac OS X client has also been released. The final retail version was first released on September 28, 2007, for Windows. The initial Linux release, created by id Software employee Timothee Besset, was made available three weeks later on October 19. As of 2019, Quake Wars is the most recent id Software game to have received a Linux release.

== Release ==
A "Limited Collector's Edition" of the game was released exclusively for Microsoft Windows on October 2, 2007, in North America and September 9 in Australia and Europe (in Europe it was released as the "Premium Edition"). The "Limited Collector's Edition" features the game itself, 10 collectible cards (there are 12 cards, but the first two are only available via preorder) and a bonus disc, which contains concept art, HD videos, interviews, artwork, downloadable icons, ringtones and music tracks.

== Reception ==
Reception

Aggregate scores
| Aggregator | Score |
|---|---|
| GameRankings | PC: 84% PS3: 65% X360: 69% |
| Metacritic | PC: 84/100; PS3: 60/100; X360: 69/100 |

Review scores
| Publication | Score |
|---|---|
| Eurogamer | 8/10 |
| GamePro | 4.5/5 |
| GameSpot | 8.5/10 |
| IGN | 8.5/10 |

On the review aggregator GameRankings, the PC version of the game had an average score of 84% based on 61 reviews. On Metacritic, the game had a score of 84 out of 100 based on 55 reviews. Kevin VanOrd of GameSpot gave the game a rating of 8.5/10. Other reviews are generally very positive, scoring Quake Wars in the 8–9 (out of 10) range. For the week ending September 29, 2007, Quake Wars was the best selling PC title in the United Kingdom according to the Entertainment and Leisure Software Publishers Association. On October 17, 2007, after its top of the charts sale in the United Kingdom, Quake Wars debuted at a familiar #1 spot yet again in the United States. According to NPD group's top 10 best selling PC game charts, it managed to take the #1 spot. Xbox 360 and PlayStation 3 reviews for the game were generally much less positive, with IGN giving the 360 version 6.1 and the PlayStation 3 version 5.3, citing game issues and inferior graphics to the PC version as causes for the lower score.
