= Persiankiwi =

Twitter user

Persiankiwi is a user of the microblog service Twitter, who was one of the most followed sources of information about the 2009 Iranian election protests. Persiankiwi was also referred to as a "popular opposition site," and "one of the most reliable and prolific Iranians on Twitter."

Persiankiwi attracted readers due to an authentic style, lack of aggressiveness, and up-to-date information apparently coming directly from Tehran. When most foreign journalists had left the country and Iranian state media outlets were thought to be biased in favor of their own government, Persiankiwi became one of the most important sources of information from inside Iran and was frequently cited in media reports around the world.

Persiankiwi's tweets temporarily stopped on 24 June 2009 after describing a violent confrontation between protestors and the Basij militia. It read "Allah – you are the creator of all and all must return to you – Allah Akbar," sparking concern about the fate of the person behind the username. Rumors arose that Persiankiwi had been arrested, or had been forced to post news under a new alias due to a compromised account. Persiankiwi resumed tweeting on 14 February 2011. Twitter user Oxfordgirl told several of her followers that she was awaiting a confirmation from persiankiwi to verify his or her identity.

The identity and location of the person behind Persiankiwi have not been made public. The user's anonymity prevents a clear picture from being drawn, but efforts have been made to analyze the writing style.

Persiankiwi should not be confused with Persiankiwie who for a while posed as Persiankiwi on Twitter. Warnings went out on Twitter that Persiankiwie was a government operative and shortly afterwards this profile disappeared from Twitter.
