= Wolfenstein: Enemy Territory =

2003 video game

- Developer(s): Splash Damage
- Publisher(s): Activision
- Director(s): Richard Jolly
- Producer(s): Jonathan Moses
- Designer(s): Paul Wedgwood
- Programmer(s): Arnout van Meer
- Artist(s): Richard Jolly
- Writer(s): Edward Stern
- Composer(s): Bill Brown
- Series: Wolfenstein
- Engine: id Tech 3
- Platform(s): Linux, AROS, Windows, MorphOS, Mac OS X
- Release: Linux, Windows; 29 May 2003; Mac OS X; 22 March 2005
- Genre(s): First-person shooter
- Mode(s): Multiplayer

Wolfenstein: Enemy Territory is a free and open-source multiplayer first-person shooter video game within the Wolfenstein series. It was originally planned to be released as a commercial expansion pack to Return to Castle Wolfenstein and later as a standalone game. However, due to problems with the single-player aspect, the multiplayer portion was released on 29 May 2003 as a freeware standalone game. In January 2004, the source code for the game logic (not the game engine) was released to the benefit of its modding community.

The game uses a modified Return to Castle Wolfenstein engine, itself being a heavily modified id Tech 3 engine, which has been open source since 2005. As of the first day of the August 2010 QuakeCon, the entire source code was released under the GNU General Public License v3.0 or later. The media assets remain proprietary.

On April 26, 2022, the game was released on Steam, and on October 20, 2022 on gog.com.

A commercially released follow-up, Enemy Territory: Quake Wars, was developed by Splash Damage.

== Gameplay ==
Wolfenstein: Enemy Territory is an online multiplayer game, wherein the players interact with each other over a network, in two teams (Allies and Axis) to defend or destroy mission objectives. The game is playable over the Internet or a local area network. In public games, PunkBuster used to protect the game, however its developer, EvenBalance, discontinued support for the game in October 2011.

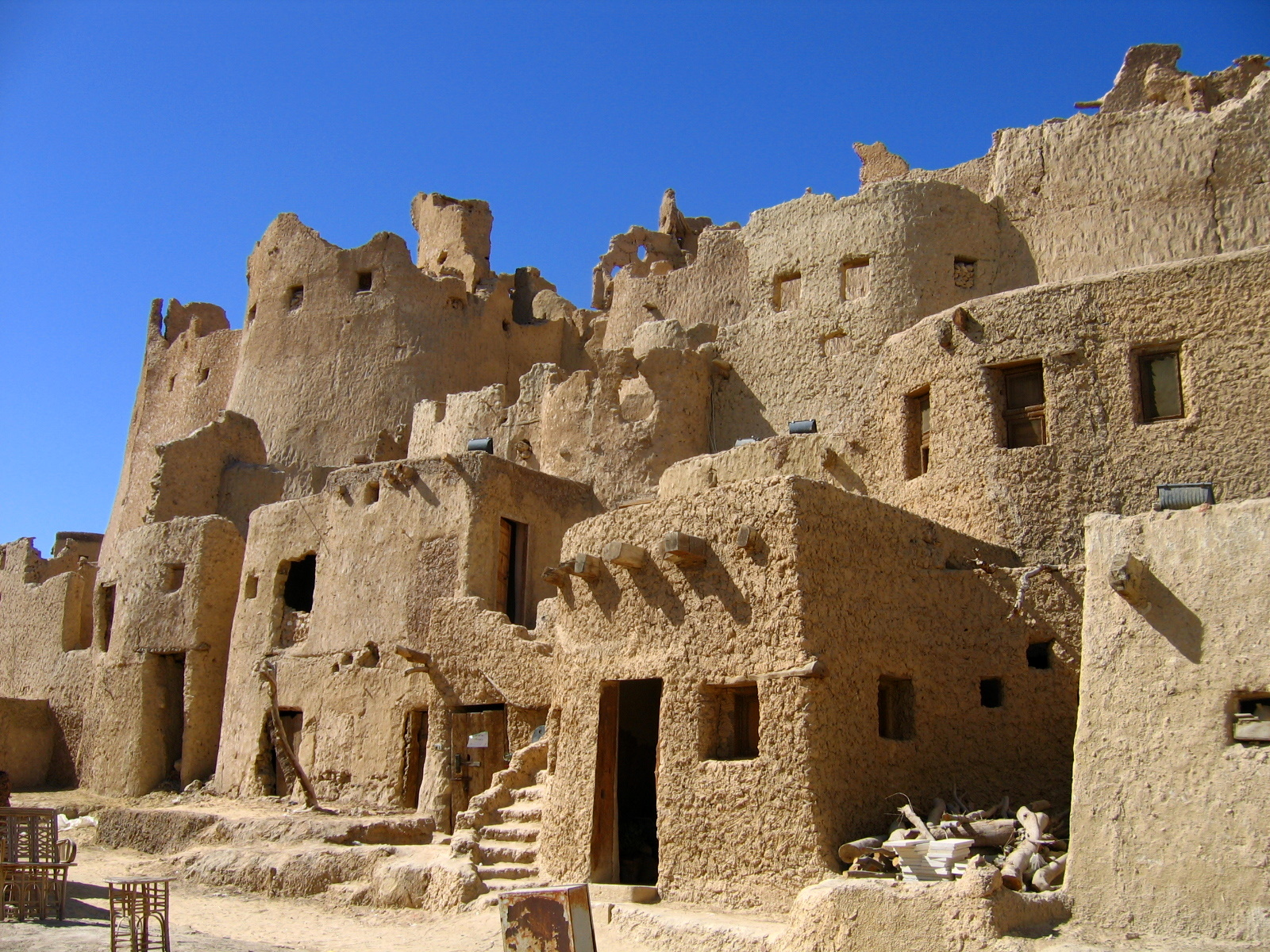
Siwa Oasis in Egypt, site of historical World War II fighting, inspired the map of the same name.

There are six officially released maps that are partially based on real locations or events (North African Campaign: Gold Rush, Siwa Oasis, and Atlantic Seawall Battery; Europe Campaign: Rail Gun, Würzburg Radar, and Fuel Dump), as well as hundreds of custom maps made by the gaming community. On most maps, the offense needs to complete a certain set of objectives within a limited amount of time. The defense needs to keep the offense from completing objectives until time runs out. Some objectives may be optional, and some objectives can be carried out by either team. These minor objectives assist the team completing them. Depending on game mode the action will continue on another map (Campaign Mode) or the same map (Objective Mode, Stopwatch Mode, Last Man Standing).

In all but the Last Man Standing Mode, dead players respawn all at the same time, every X seconds. In the default maps—assuming that the server settings are not changing it—Allies spawn every 20 seconds and the Axis every 30 seconds, the only exception being Rail Gun where both have a 20-second spawn. With default settings, one can see the spawn timer in the right side of the screen. Experienced players should watch the timer all the time—dying to a 1-second spawn practically means losing your position (and a life, if the server has the rarely used Limited Lives feature enabled) and resetting your health and ammo, while a 30-second spawn can be deadly if there are only a few players. A good tactic is to find out the spawn time of your enemy, for example looking at the mission timer, and time your attacks so that every dead opponent will have to wait a full-time spawn.

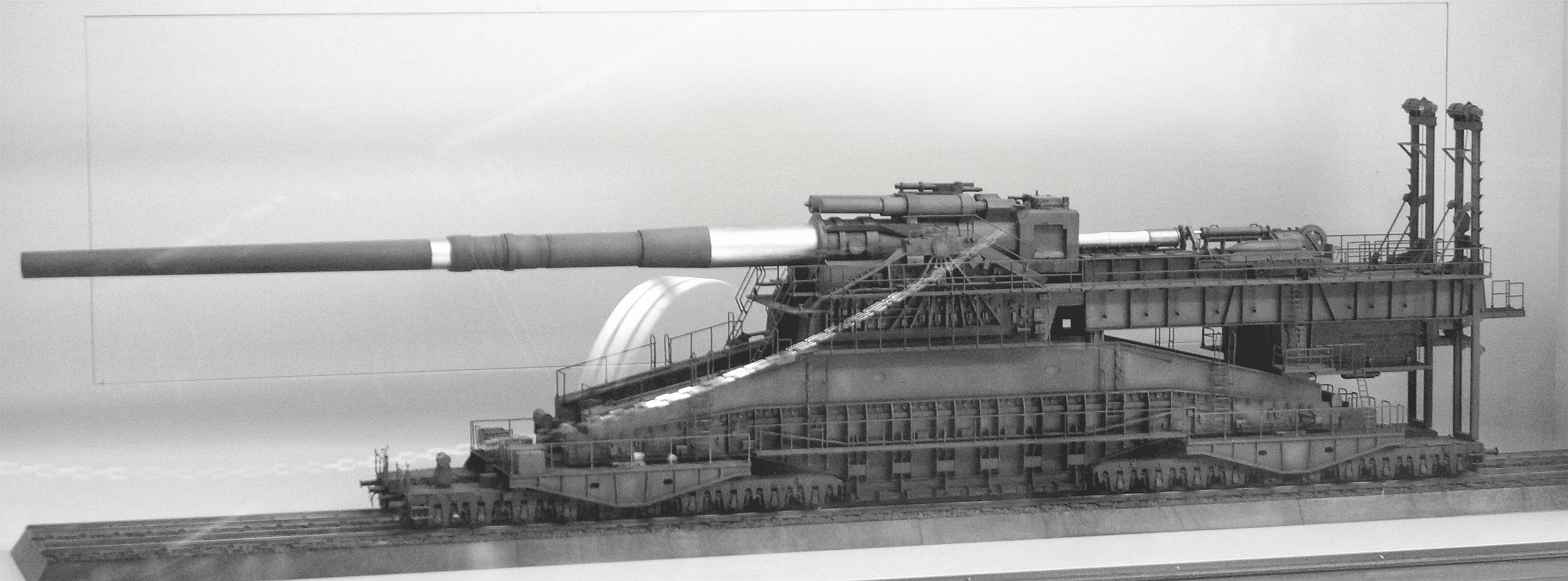
A model of the German railway gun Dora which inspired the Railgun map

In the official six map campaign (most common on public servers), Allies are offense for all but one map, Railgun. In Stopwatch Mode (most common for locked or LAN servers) two teams—most common setups: 6vs6 or 3vs3—will play the same map twice, once on each side and the winner is the team with the fastest offense (it can be a tie when both teams defense manage to keep the offense from completing the objectives until time runs out (commonly known as a "full hold")).

Players may earn experience points in several skill categories. All character classes may earn points in Battle Sense and Light Weapons. Class skills are generally restricted to the current class, the exception being Heavy Weapons (the Soldier class skill).

Players have certain abilities based on their character class. The player has a Power Bar that provides "power" for their special abilities. The power bar regenerates slowly. Constructing the Command post speeds up the recharge rate though. Players have up to eight weapon slots, depending on character class. The classes that are available are engineer, soldier, field ops, medic, and covert ops.

=== Ranking and advancement ===
Players start off as a Private (Allies) or Schütze (Axis).

Through gameplay, experience can be gained for three categories: Battle Sense, Light Weapons, and a skill determined by the player's current chosen class. Certain class benefits remain with the player even if they change classes, and benefits from the two general skills are available to the player throughout, regardless of class change. Once a player has accrued enough experience points in a particular skill, the skill is automatically advanced to the next level, providing the player with a new ability or advantage. There are four attainable levels in each skill, awarded at 20, 50, 90 and 140 experience points; some mods add new levels.

Depending on the server's settings, a player's experience (XP) can be deleted at the end of a campaign, when the player disconnects, or after a set period of time. Experience can also be saved even upon disconnection. In competitions and select public servers, rankings are disabled, meaning that XP gives no advantage. The meaning of this is to make games faster; as defenders usually get a lot more XP, they would become stronger during the match, making the end game very difficult for the offensive team.

== Community development ==
Based on the source code of Wolfenstein: Enemy Territory, ET: Legacy (ETL) is an open source project aiming to create a modernized client and server while still being as compatible as possible with the original game version, ET 2.60b, and its game mods. ET: Legacy's changes include an updated game engine, many bug and security fixes, a client auto updater, the Legacy game mod and overhauls for many classic maps.
