= Sin Mission Pack: Wages of Sin =

1999 video game

- Developer: 2015
- Publisher: Activision
- Engine: Quake II engine
- Platform: Windows
- Release: NA: February 25, 1999; UK: March 12, 1999
- Genre: First-person shooter
- Modes: Single-player, multiplayer

Sin Mission Pack: Wages of Sin is an expansion pack for Ritual Entertainment's first-person shooter game Sin. It was developed by 2015 as their first retail product and published by Activision in February 1999. Taking place after the events depicted in Sin, players once again assume the role of HARDCORPS officer John R. Blade as he attempts to stop Mafia boss Gianni Manero from taking control of the remnants of SinTEK following the disappearance of its villainous CEO, Elexis Sinclaire.

After Nightdive Studios acquired the rights to the Sin franchise in 2020, Sin and Wages of Sin were republished together as Sin: Gold on Steam and GOG.com.

== Gameplay ==
Wages of Sin is a video game that builds upon the mechanics of its predecessor while introducing new elements to change the gameplay experience. Among these differences are new enemies, locations, and weapons, such as the addition of a flashlight, night vision goggles, and rope. Furthermore, the game offers a multiplayer mode called "Hoverbike Deathmatch", providing an alternative way for players to engage with the game.

== Plot ==
After Elexis Sinclaire's disappearance at the end of Sin, mob boss Gianni Manero seeks to gain power from the remnants of Elexis' former company, SinTEK. Manero produces new genetically engineered creatures (mutants) under secret supervision, but when some of the mutants break out and escape into Freeport City, the elite security force group HARDCORPS becomes aware of their existence. HARDCORPS leader John Blade, who starred as the player character in Sin, sets out to set things right. Blade's hunt for Manero leads him to new locations of Freeport City that were not included in the original game, encountering new enemies and weapons along the way. Some elements of the game, such as whether a specific level is visited during the day or night, can change depending on the player's choices, such as whether a scientist's kidnapped daughter is saved from being killed.

Although Elexis Sinclaire never appears in Wages of Sin, she is often referred to (in serious and humorous ways) throughout the game, and the ending hints towards her return (which occurs in Sin's official sequel, Sin Episodes: Emergence).

== Development ==
Wages of Sin runs on the Quake II engine, utilizing the same technology the original game is based on. However, great attention to detail and interactivity was kept when 2015 designed Wages of Sin, resulting in even more options and visual treats than Sin could offer. Because the entire expansion takes place in Freeport City, the player can visit many more locations in the city than was possible in Sin, such as a cargo ship, a vacant building, a nightclub, and Manero's caSino and penthouse complex.

== Reception ==
Reception

Aggregate score
| Aggregator | Score |
|---|---|
| GameRankings | 75% |

Review scores
| Publication | Score |
|---|---|
| AllGame | 4/5 |
| CNET Gamecenter | 8/10 |
| Computer Games Strategy Plus | 3/5 |
| Computer Gaming World | 3.5/5 |
| GamePro | 3.5/5 |
| GameRevolution | B |
| GameSpot | 7.7/10 |
| PC Accelerator | 7/10 |
| PC PowerPlay | 73% |
| PC Zone | 84% |

The game received generally positive reviews according to the review aggregation website GameRankings. GameRevolution said, "As an add-on, Wages of Sin is great. Unfortunately, was Sin ever that good to begin with? It becomes stale quickly and almost tediously repetitive as time went on, lacking both the sharpness and polish of games like Half-Life, which took the Quake 2 engine to new untold highs. Wages of Sin is still good, but it expands on that flawed base, like a rose growing from soil that was not blessed with Miracle Grow." GameSpot was also mostly positive in their review, which stated,"Despite the sound problem and the other minor issues, however, Wages of Sin is a very impressive first-person shooter. If you held onto your copy of Sin and resisted the urge to return it before the patch came out, you should definitely give this mission pack a try. It's not a groundbreaking game experience, but it is a fast-paced, action-packed first-person romp that hearkens back to the classics of the genre."
