= Bianca Beauchamp =

Canadian fetish model (b. 1977)

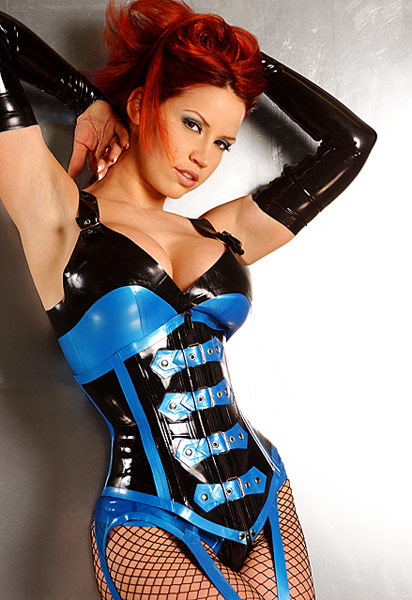
- Beauchamp in 2007
- Born: Bianca Stéphanie Beauchamp; October 14, 1977 (age 48); Montreal, Quebec, Canada
- Occupations: Fetish model; pornographic actress
- Years active: 1998–present (modeling)
- Modelling information
- Height: 5 ft 2 in (1.57 m)
- Orientation: Bisexual
- Hair colour: Red (formerly brown)
- Eye colour: Hazel
- Website: ilovebianca.com

Bianca Beauchamp (French pronunciation: [bjɑ̃ka boʃɑ̃], born October 14, 1977) is a Canadian fetish model best known for her glamour, erotic, and latex fetish modeling.

== Early life and education ==
Bianca Beauchamp was born on October 14, 1977 in Montreal, Quebec to a French Canadian father and an Italian mother. She was named after Bianca Jagger. She grew up in Montreal, where she was raised in a low-income neighbourhood. After having difficulty at home, Beauchamp moved away soon after graduating high school. She began a course in French literature at a CEGEP, hoping to become a high-school French teacher. Beauchamp managed to pass the entrance exam for an exclusive private school. After achieving her certificate, she began studying French and started a teaching job at Université du Québec à Montréal.

Beauchamp is bisexual. She met aspiring photographer Martin Perreault at the age of 18. Perreault convinced her to pose for photographs as his muse and she began modeling for him. Around 1995, then 20-year-old Beauchamp bought her first latex dress, saying later that she loved how latex contours her whole body and how special the material was for her.

== Career ==
After entering latex fetishism in 1998, Beauchamp and Perreault founded the website Latex Lair (now known as ilovebianca.com). The website showcased erotic galleries and erotic filmography of Beauchamp donning latex clothing, with Perreault shooting most of their work. The duo's work eventually built an international recognition in the latex fashion scene. During her teaching internship at Université du Québec à Montréal, one of the staff discovered their website and suggested that she shut it down, even though at the time it contained no nudity. Beauchamp took down the website, but re-opened the site after completing the internship, prompting the university to threaten to fail her if it remained online. Beauchamp realized her passion for fetish modeling outweighed that for teaching and left university at the age of 23 to pursue her modeling career.

Beauchamp soon appeared in photoshoots for Bizarre, Marquis, Nightlife, Penthouse, Playboy, Skin Two, and Whiplash, while working at McDonald's, a video store, a sex shop, and as a strip club waitress until her fetish modeling career was fully established.

In January 2007, Beauchamp became the first model to appear on the front cover of Bizarre magazine six times. Later that same year, she represented Hype Energy at the 2007 Canadian Grand Prix. Her photos have been in several Playboy Special Edition issues, including the cover of a Book of Lingerie issue. She has also been on the cover of the Playboy Girls of Canada calendar twice. In partnership with her website and Ritual Entertainment, she portrayed the character Elexis Sinclaire for the video game Sin Episodes: Emergence.

In January 2008, Beauchamp was named 31st in Askmen.com's Top 99 Women of the Year, a popular "Hot List" for celebrities. The following year, her ranking increased to 24th. In January 2009, she once again appeared on the cover of Bizarre magazine, her 9th cover for the UK magazine, confirming her lead as the model who appeared the most times on Bizarre.

=== Books and film ===
In 2006, Beauchamp released the self-published book Bianca Beauchamp – Fetish Sex Symbol, which focuses on her modeling career as a latex fetish model.

In 2007, Beauchamp released her film Bianca Beauchamp: All Access, a reality documentary directed and edited by her partner, Perreault. The 85-minute film was premiered at Fantasia Film Festival in July 2007 and was issued as a 2-disc special edition DVD in September 2007. The film was acquired by distributor HALO 8 Entertainment at the Fantasia Festival and was slated for a wide release in North America on January 29, 2008.

In August 2008, Beauchamp premiered Bianca Beauchamp All Access 2: Rubberised at the Montreal Fetish Weekend, with full red carpet treatment and a sold-out theatre. The DVD was released the same day. In 2014, she appeared along with Daniel Baldwin, Ron Jeremy, Michael Madsen, and Malcolm McDowell in the slasher film Lady Psycho Killer.

== Personal life ==
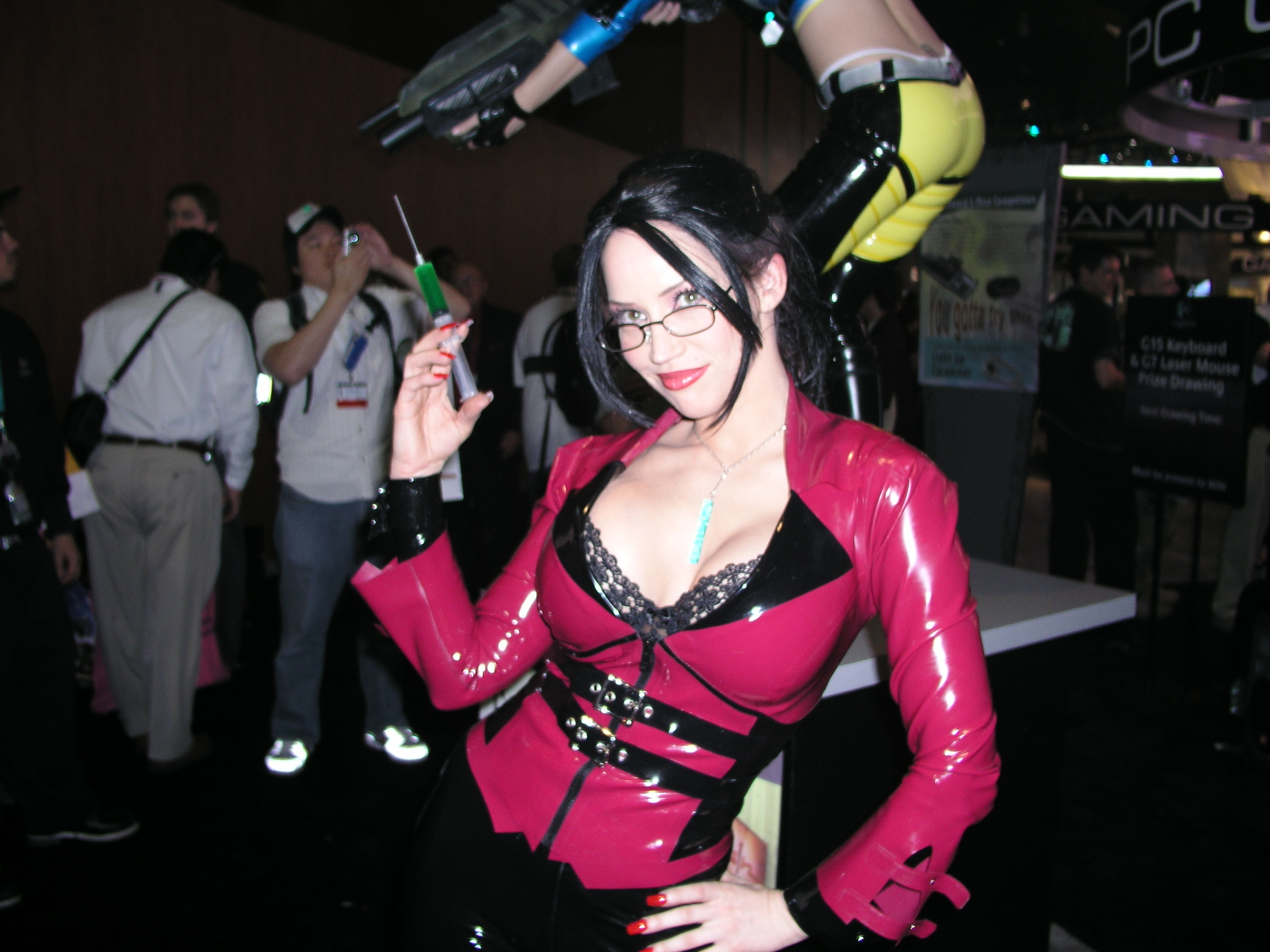
Beauchamp dressed as Elexis Sinclaire from Sin Episodes: Emergence, 2006

Soon after deciding to concentrate on modeling, Beauchamp quit her job at McDonald's and began a fitness regime in order to stay in shape. She lost a significant amount of weight in a short period of time, causing her breasts to begin sagging. This prompted her to decide to undergo breast augmentation surgery, which increased her cup size from a 32C to a 32DD. After a year, finding the saline implants unsatisfactory due to visible skin rippling, she underwent surgery a second time, getting slightly bigger silicone implants and once again increasing her cup size. In 2009, Beauchamp went for an additional breast surgery, this time increasing the silicone implants to 800cc and her cup size to 32FF. She dismisses criticism about the implants, deeming it hypocritical to applaud people for improving their intellects while condemning them for improving their bodies.

Martin Perreault and Bianca Beauchamp are no longer a couple as of 2017.

== Filmography ==
Film

Year	Title	Role	Notes
2007	Bianca Beauchamp: All Access	Herself	Producer Documentary
2008	Bianca Beauchamp All Access 2: Rubberized at the Montreal Fetish Weekend	Herself	Producer Documentary
2015	Lady Psycho Killer	Stripper	
2018	Spatss!	Blonde Brigitta Bardotti	Short film

Television

Year	Title	Role	Notes
2015	Heroes of the North	Crimson	
