= Quake II =

1997 video game

- Developer: id Software (Note: The enhanced version of the game was developed by Nightdive Studios. Raster Productions L.L.C. ported the game to N64.)
- Publisher: Activision (Note: Bethesda Softworks published the enhanced version of the game.)
- Designers: Tim Willits; American McGee; Christian Antkow; Jennell Jaquays; Brandon James
- Programmers: John Carmack; John Cash; Brian Hook
- Artists: Adrian Carmack; Kevin Cloud; Paul Steed
- Composer: Sonic Mayhem
- Series: Quake
- Engine: Quake II engine (Note: The enhanced version uses the KEX Engine.)
- Platform: Windows: AmigaOS, Mac OS, Nintendo 64, PlayStation, Linux, Xbox 360, Zeebo, Nintendo Switch, PlayStation 4, PlayStation 5, Xbox One, Xbox Series X/S, BeOS
- Release: December 9, 1997: Windows; NA: December 9, 1997; EU/AU: December 12, 1997; Linux; WW: January 6, 1998; Mac OS; NA: July 1, 1999; Nintendo 64; NA: July 7, 1999; EU: July 1999; PlayStation; NA: October 5, 1999; EU: October 1999; Xbox 360; NA: November 22, 2005; EU: December 2, 2005; AU: March 23, 2006; Switch, PS4, PS5, Xbox One, Xbox Series X/S; WW: August 10, 2023
- Genre: First-person shooter
- Modes: Single-player, multiplayer

Quake II is a 1997 first-person shooter game developed by id Software and published by Activision. It is the second installment of the Quake series, following Quake. Developed over the course of a year, Quake II was released on December 9, 1997. In contrast to the first game, which featured a combination of science fiction and fantasy elements, Quake II entirely drops the latter elements and is set during humankind's war against a rogue alien race known as the Strogg, half-mutant half-machine creatures whose homeplanet, Stroggos, is the target of the humans' invasion force. The player takes the role of a space marine (referred to as Bitterman) as he crash-lands on the planet and, being the last survivor of his squad, is tasked with completing a series of missions to cripple the Strogg and end their plans to conquer Earth. The game's storyline is continued in its expansions, including one tying in Quake II and the first game, and Quake 4. The game's heavy metal soundtrack was provided by Sascha Dikiciyan.

Besides its single player component, Quake II also uses a client/server network system similar to that of Quake for multiplayer. Unlike Quake, where hardware acceleration was only implemented through later patches, Quake II was released with native OpenGL support. Quake II was also the first id Software game not to be released for the then-deprecated MS-DOS operating system, rather running natively on Windows 95, with several ports to other systems following afterwards. The source code for Quake II was released by id Software under the GPL license on December 21, 2001.

Quake II received critical acclaim on its release, and similarly to its predecessor is generally considered to be one of the best video games ever made. An "enhanced" version of Quake II developed by Nightdive Studios was released for Nintendo Switch, PlayStation 4, PlayStation 5, Microsoft Windows, Xbox One, Xbox Series X/S on August 10, 2023. It includes the original game and its two expansion packs, an episode consisting of the levels from the Nintendo 64 version of the game, and a brand new episode designed by MachineGames.

== Gameplay ==
The single-player mode in Quake II involves gun-battles often with multiple enemies in large, outdoor areas.

Quake II is a first-person shooter, in which the player shoots enemies from the perspective of the main character. The gameplay is very similar to that featured in Quake, in terms of movement and controls, although the player's movement speed has been slowed down, and the player now has the ability to crouch. The game retains four of the eight weapons from Quake (the Shotgun, Super Shotgun, Grenade Launcher, and Rocket Launcher), although they have been redesigned visually and made to function in slightly different ways. The remainder of Quake's eight weapons (the Axe, Nailgun, Super Nailgun, and Thunderbolt) are not present in Quake II. The six new weapons are the Blaster, Machine Gun, Chain Gun, Hyperblaster, Railgun, and BFG10K. The Quad Damage power up from Quake is present in Quake II, and new power-ups include the Ammo Pack, Invulnerability, Bandolier, Enviro-Suit, Rebreather, and Silencer.

The single-player game features a number of changes from Quake. First, the player is given mission-based objectives that correspond to the storyline, including stealing a Tank Commander's head to open a door and calling down an air-strike on a bunker. CGI cutscenes are used to illustrate the player's progress through the main objectives, although they are all essentially the same short piece of video, showing a computerized image of the player character as he moves through game's levels. Another addition is the inclusion of a non-hostile character type: the player character's captured comrades. It is not possible to interact with these characters, however, as they have all been driven insane by their Strogg captors. The game features much larger levels than Quake, with many more wide open areas. A hub system allows the player to travel back and forth between levels, which is necessary to complete certain objectives. Some of the textures and symbols that appear in the game are similar to some of those found in Quake. Enemies demonstrate visible wounds after they have taken damage.

The multiplayer portion is similar to that of Quake. It can be played as a free-for-all deathmatch game mode, a cooperative version of the single-player game, or as a 1 vs 1 match that is used in official tournaments, like the Cyberathlete Professional League. It can also be played in Capture the Flag mode (CTF). The deathmatch game benefited from the release of eight specifically designed levels that id Software added after the game's initial release. They were introduced to the game via one of the early patches, that were released free of charge. Prior to the release of these maps, players were limited to playing multiplayer games on the single-player levels, which, while functional as multiplayer levels, were not designed with deathmatch gameplay specifically in mind.

As in Quake, it is possible to customize the way in which the player appears to other people in multiplayer games. However, whereas in Quake, the only option was to change the color of the player's uniform unless third party modifications were used, now the game comes with a selection of three different player models: a male marine, a female marine, and a male cyborg; choice of player model also affects the speech effects the player's character will make, such as exhaling in effort while jumping or groaning when injured. Each model can be customized from in the in-game menu via the selection of pre-drawn skins, which differ in many ways; for example, skin color, camouflage style, and application of facepaint.

== Plot ==
Quake II takes place in a science fiction environment set against the backdrop of a war between humanity and an alien race known as the Strogg, who capture and convert organic creatures into horrific cyborgs for their war machine. In the single-player game, the player assumes the role of a Marine named Bitterman taking part in "Operation Alien Overlord", a desperate attempt to end the war by launching a counter-offensive on the alien home planet of Stroggos. Most of the other soldiers are captured or killed as soon as they approach the planned landing zone. Bitterman survives because another Marine's personal capsule collided with his upon launch, causing him to crash far short of the landing zone. Bitterman fights his way through the highly industrial Strogg city, destroying strategic objectives along the way, and finally kills the Strogg leader, the Makron, in his orbital asteroid base.

== Development ==
Unlike its predecessor, Quake II's engine allows colored lighting effects and skyboxes.

Originally, Quake II was supposed to be a new game and intellectual property; titles like "Strogg", "Lock and Load", and just "Load" were toyed with in the early days of development. But after numerous failed attempts, the team at id decided to stick with Quake II and forgo the Gothic Lovecraftian horror theme from the original in favor of a more sci-fi aesthetic.

It was a conscious decision [to change Quake II's direction] and controversial inside the company. We weren't happy with the [original] Quake story. [John] Romero was gone, so there was no one left to defend it. Kevin Cloud headed up Quake II and he wanted to make it story-driven.

— Todd Hollenshead

In the 2023 documentary FPS: First Person Shooter, both designer Tim Willits and artist/co-owner Adrian Carmack agreed that looking back, the game should have had a different name. One of the names that almost got approved was "Wor." However, due to legal concerns, the development team ultimately decided to use the Quake name despite the sequel having no narrative connection to the original game. Willits also noted that the game's premise drew inspiration from the 1961 World War II film The Guns of Navarone, particularly its depiction of a mission to destroy an apparently impregnable fortress housing a massive weapon.

The game was developed with a 13-person team. Activision obtained the worldwide distribution rights to the game in May 1997. Adrian had said that Quake II is his favorite game in the series because "it was different and a cohesive project". This is the last id Software game to feature American McGee as he was fired shortly after its release.

Unlike Quake, where hardware-accelerated graphics controllers were supported only with later patches, Quake II came with OpenGL support out of the box. Later downloads from id Software added support for AMD's 3DNow! instruction set for improved performance on their K6-2 processors, and Rendition released a native renderer for their V1000 graphics chip. The latest version is 3.21. This update includes numerous bug fixes and new levels designed for multiplayer deathmatch. Version 3.21, available as source code on id Software's FTP server, has no improved functionality over version 3.20 and is simply a slight modification to make compiling for Linux easier.

Quake II uses an improved client–server model introduced in Quake. The game code of Quake II, which defines all the functionality for weapons, entities, and game mechanics, can be changed in any way because id Software published the source code of their own implementation that shipped with the game. Quake II uses the shared library functionality of the operating system to load the game library at run-time—this is how mod authors are able to alter the game and provide different gameplay mechanics, new weapons, and much more. The full source code to Quake II version 3.19 was released under the terms of the GNU GPL-2.0-or-later on December 22, 2001. Version 3.21 followed later. An LCC-friendly version was released on January 1, 2002, by a modder going by the name of Major Bitch.

Quake II's game engine was a popular license and formed the basis for several commercial and free games, such as CodeRED: Alien Arena, War§ow, SiN, Anachronox, Heretic II, Daikatana, Soldier of Fortune, Kingpin: Life of Crime, and UFO: Alien Invasion. Valve's 1998 video game Half-Life used the Quake II engine during early development stages. However, the final version runs on a heavily modified version of the Quake engine, GoldSrc, with a small amount of the Quake II code.

=== Music ===
The soundtrack for Quake II was mainly provided by Sonic Mayhem, with some additional tracks by Bill Brown; the main theme was also composed by Bill Brown and Rob Zombie, and one track by Jer Sypult. The soundtrack for the Nintendo 64 version of the game was composed by Aubrey Hodges, credited as Ken "Razor" Richmond.

=== Source ports ===
Since the release of the Quake II engine's source code, several updates from third-party projects to the game engine have been created; the most prominent of these are projects focused on graphical enhancements to the game such as most notable Yamagi Quake II, Quake2maX, EGL, Quake II Evolved, and KMQuake II. The source release also revealed numerous security flaws which can result in remote compromise of both the Quake II client and server. As id Software no longer maintains Quake II, most third-party engines include fixes for these bugs. The unofficial patch 3.24 that fixes bugs and provides minor balance tweaks is popular among Quake II purists, as it is an update to the original engine code, rather than a modernized fork. The most popular server-side engine modification for multiplayer, R1Q2, is generally recommended as a replacement for the 3.20 release for both clients and servers.

In July 2003, Vertigo Software released a source port of Quake II for the Microsoft .NET platform, using Managed C++, called Quake II .NET. It became a poster application for the language, showcasing the powerful interoperability between .NET and standard C++ code. It remains one of the top downloads on the Visual C++ website. In May 2004, Bytonic Software released a source port of Quake II (called Jake2) written in Java using JOGL. In 2010 Google ported Jake2 to HTML5, running in Safari and Chrome.

In December 2018, Polish programmer Krzysztof Kondrak released the original Quake II v3.21 source code with Vulkan support added. The port, called vkQuake2, is available under the GPLv2.

A new source port of the game, titled Quake II RTX, was announced by Nvidia in March 2019 and was released on June 6 for Windows and Linux on Steam. This source port requires either a Nvidia RTX or an AMD Radeon RX 6000 series GPU or higher to utilize these cards' hardware ray tracing functionality, but a software fallback is available for graphics cards that are fast enough. The source port, provided free of charge, includes the three levels present in the original Quake II demo, (Note: Nvidia calls it shareware but Quake II was the first id Software game that did not have a shareware release.) but can be used to play the full game if its data files are available. Unlike in most games, ray tracing is used extensively here for lighting, reflections, etc. This is only possible because of the otherwise low hardware demands of Quake II.

== Release ==
Quake II released on December 9, 1997, in the United States and on December 12 in Europe. Despite the title, Quake II is a sequel to the original Quake in name only. The scenario, enemies, and theme are separate and do not fall into the same continuity as Quake. id initially wanted to set it separately from Quake, but for legal reasons (most of their suggested names were already taken), they decided to use the working title.Quake II was adopted as a name to leverage the popularity of Quake according to Jennell Jaquays. Quake II has been released on Steam, but this version does not include the soundtrack. The game was released on a bonus disc included with Quake 4 Special Edition for the PC, along with both expansion packs. This version lacks the soundtrack. Quake II is available on a bonus disc with the Xbox 360 version of Quake 4. This version is a direct port featuring the original soundtrack and multiplayer maps. In 2015, Quake II: Quad Damage, a bundle containing the original game with the mission packs has been released at GOG.com, but unlike the previous releases, this one contains a new customizable launcher and the official soundtrack in OGG format which was made possible to play in-game, making it the only digital release at the time to include music.

The game has been included the compilations Quake II: Quad Damage (contains Quake II and all three official expansion packs), Quake II: Colossus (a compilation for Linux that contains Quake II and both mission packs) and Ultimate Quake (a compilation including the original Quake trilogy).

=== Ports ===
Ports of Quake II were released in 1999 on the Nintendo 64 (ported by Raster Productions) and PlayStation (ported by HammerHead) video game consoles. In both cases, the core gameplay was largely identical; however, changes were made to the game sequence and split-screen multiplayer replaced network or Internet play. A Macintosh port was developed by Logicware and released in July 1999. Quake II: Colossus (Quake II with both official add-ons) was ported to Linux by id Software and published by Macmillan Digital Publishing in 1999. Be Inc. ported Quake II: Colossus to BeOS to test their OpenGL acceleration in 1999, and provided the game files for free download at a later date—a Windows, Macintosh, or Linux install CD was required to install the game, with the add-ons being optional.

Quake II on the PlayStation

The PlayStation version contains abridged versions of Units 1, 3, 6, 7, 8, and 10 of the PC version, redesigned to meet the console's technical limitations. For example, many short airlock-like corridors were added to maps to provide loading pauses inside what were contiguous areas in the PC version. In addition, part of the first mission of the N64 port is used as a prologue. Some enemy types were removed and two new enemies was added: the Arachnid, a human-spider cyborg with twin railgun arms, and the Guardian, a bipedal boss enemy. Saving the game is only possible between levels and at mid-level checkpoints where the game loads, while in the PC version the game could be saved and loaded at any time. The game supports the PlayStation Mouse peripheral to provide a greater parity with the PC version's gameplay. The music used in this port is a combination of the Quake II original music score and tracks from the PC version's mission packs, while the opening and closing cut-scenes are taken from the Ground Zero expansion pack. The PlayStation version uses an engine developed by HammerHead for their future PlayStation projects and runs at a 512x240 resolution at 30 frames per second. The developer was keen to retain a visual parity with the PC version and avoid tricks such as the use of environmental fog. Colored lights for levels and enemies, and yellow highlights for gunfire and explosions, are carried across from the PC version, with the addition of lens flare effects located around the light sources on the original lightmaps. There is no skybox; instead, a flat Gouraud-textured purple "sky" is drawn across the ceiling. The game uses particles to render blood, debris, and rail gun beams analogously to the PC version. There is a split-screen multiplayer mode for two to four players (a four player game is possible using the PlayStation's Multi-tap).

The Nintendo 64 version has different single-player levels and multiplayer maps, and features multiplayer support for up to four players. This version has advanced lighting effects, improved animated skybox and water, and uses the Expansion Pak for smoother framerate and hi-color depth mode. This port features a new soundtrack, consisting mostly of dark ambient pieces, composed by Aubrey Hodges.

A port of Quake II was included with Quake 4 for the Xbox 360 on a bonus disc. This is a direct port of the original game, with some graphical improvements. The port allows for System Link play for up to sixteen players, split-screen for four players, and cooperative play in single-player for up to sixteen players or four players with split-screen alone.

=== Enhanced version ===
An "enhanced" version of Quake II developed by Nightdive Studios was released for Nintendo Switch, PlayStation 4, PlayStation 5, Microsoft Windows, Xbox One, Xbox Series X/S on August 10, 2023, during QuakeCon. It collects the full single-player campaign alongside all previously released official expansions and multiplayer maps. It is the first console version of the game to be presented in native widescreen at a resolution of 1080p and 60 frames-per-second performance on the eighth-generation platforms, while the PlayStation 5, Xbox One X, Xbox Series X/S and Windows releases are able to support native 4K (3840x2160) resolution and up to 120FPS with compatible displays. The Xbox Series X/S and Windows releases also support 8-player splitscreen. This version of the game also introduces a new single-player expansion, Call of the Machine, which was designed exclusively for the enhanced version by Bethesda studio MachineGames, comprising 28 additional levels and a new Deathmatch map. The Nintendo 64 version of Quake II is also bundled with the enhanced version as a bonus.

== Additional content ==
=== Official expansions ===
Quake II Mission Pack: The Reckoning is the first expansion pack, released on May 27, 1998. It was developed by Xatrix Entertainment. First announced in January 1998, it features eighteen single player levels, six deathmatch levels, three weapons (the Ion Ripper, Phalanx Particle Cannon, and Trap), a power-up, two enemies, seven modified versions of existing enemies, and five music tracks. The storyline follows Joker, a member of an elite squad of marines on a mission to infiltrate a Strogg base on one of Stroggos' moons and destroy the Strogg fleet, which is preparing to attack. Joker crash lands in the swamps outside of the compound where his squad is waiting. He travels through the swamps and bypasses the compounds outer defenses and enters through the main gate, finding his squad just in time to watch them get executed by Strogg forces. Next, Joker escapes on his own to the fuel refinery where he helps the Air Force destroy all fuel production, then infiltrates the Strogg spaceport, boards a cargo ship and reaches the Moon Base, destroying it and the Strogg fleet. The section of the game that takes place on the Moon Base has low gravity, something that was previously used on one secret level of the original Quake. The Reckoning received mixed reviews. It holds 69.50% from Gamerankings and GameSpot given a score of 7.4/10.

Quake II Mission Pack: Ground Zero is the second expansion pack, released on September 11, 1998. It was developed by Rogue Entertainment. It comes with fourteen single-player levels, ten multiplayer maps, five additional music tracks, five enemies, seven power-ups, and five weapons. In the expansion's story the Gravity Well has trapped the Earth Fleet in orbit above the planet Stroggos. One of the marines who managed to land, Stepchild, must now make his way to the Gravity Well to destroy it and free the fleet above and disable the entire defenses of the planet.

Ground Zero received average to mixed reviews. It holds 65.40% from Gamerankings. Patrick Baggatta of IGN gave the expansion 7.5/10, describing it as similar to the original, but noting occasionally confusing map design. Elliott Chin of GameSpot gave the game 7.9/10, citing it as decent for an expansion and praising the monsters and enhanced AI. Johnny B. of Game Revolution rated the expansion D+, citing bad level design and few additions to the original game, and noted the multiplayer power-up gameplay as the only fun feature. Quake II Netpack I: Extremities contains, among other features, 11 game mods and 12 deathmatch maps. The fourth mission pack, Call of the Machine, was released as part of the enhanced version of Quake II released on August 10, 2023.

=== Unofficial expansions ===
Two unofficial expansions were released on CDs in 1998: Zaero, developed by Team Evolve and published by Macmillan Digital Publishing, and Juggernaut: The New Story, developed by Canopy Games and published by HeadGames Publishing.

=== Community content ===
As with the original Quake, Quake II was designed to allow players to easily create custom content. A large number of mods, maps, graphics such as player models and skins, and sound effects were created and distributed to others free of charge via the Internet. Popular websites such as PlanetQuake and Telefragged allowed players to gain access to custom content. Another improvement over Quake was that it was easier to select custom player models, skins, and sound effects because they could be selected from an in-game menu.

Mods for the game include Action Quake from 1999. PC Gaming World's Simon Quirk wrote of the game, "The Action Quake team fancied a multiplayer-only total conversion of Quake II where strategy, accuracy, and cool-looking fights would dominate."

== Reception ==
=== Critical reception ===
Reception

Aggregate score
Aggregator	Score
GameRankings	87% (PC); 81% (N64); 80% (PS)

Review scores
Publication	Score
AllGame	4/5 (PC)
Computer and Video Games	3/5 (PC)
GameFan	248/300 (N64)
GameSpot	9.0/10 (PC)
Next Generation	4/5 (PC, N64)
PC PowerPlay	94%
Macworld	4/5
The Sydney Morning Herald	4.5/5

Quake II received very positive reviews across all platforms. Next Generation reviewed the PC version of the game and stated that "all in all, id should be commended for the advancement of its technology and improvement in its single-player level design, but it's going to be up to mod designers to provide the necessary additions to the multiplayer game in order to make it stand out from Quake." GamePro said the game "lives up to its impossibly high hype." Praising its interconnected levels, new weapons, enemy design, soundtrack, and the ability to play as a female character in multiplayer mode (which they called "an overdue nod to the growing number of QuakeGrrls"), they gave it a perfect 5.0 out of 5 in all four categories (graphics, sound, control, and funfactor). On aggregating review website GameRankings, the PC version held 87%, the Nintendo 64 version 81%, and the PlayStation version 80%. AllGame editor Michael L. House stated, "the beauty of Quake II is not in the single-player game, it's in the multi-player feature." GameSpot editor Vince Broady described Quake II as "the only first-person shooter to render the original Quake entirely obsolete." Daniel Erickson reviewed the N64 version of the game for Next Generation, and stated that it was "a good first-person shooter with a great multiplayer mode; GoldenEye is no longer the only game in town."

At the Academy of Interactive Arts & Sciences' inaugural Interactive Achievement Awards, Quake II was awarded "PC Action Game of the Year"; it also received nominations for "Computer Entertainment Title of the Year" and "Interactive Title of the Year". Quake II won Macworld's 1999 "Best Shoot-'Em-Up" award, and the magazine's Christopher Breen wrote: "In either single-player or multiplayer mode, for careening-through-corridor-carnage satisfaction, Quake II is a must-have." It also won Computer Gaming World's 1997 "Action Game of the Year" award. The editors wrote that "for pure adrenaline-pumping, visceral, instantly gratifying action, Quake II is the hands-down winner. No game gave us the rush that Quake II did". In 1998, PC Gamer declared it the 3rd-best computer game ever released, and the editors called it "id's gun-happy masterpiece is the most sensational and subtle shooter ever, and one of the best games of any type ever created." In 1999, Next Generation listed Quake II as number 5 on their "Top 50 Games of All Time", commenting that, "Quake 2 is the standard for multiplayer shooting, and we've yet to see a 'Quake killer' that can keep us from returning to multiplayer Quake for longer than a month or so."

=== Sales ===
Quake II entered PC Data's monthly computer game sales rankings at #2 for December 1997, behind Riven. The game's sales in the United States alone reached 240,913 copies by the end of 1997, after its release on December 9. According to PC Data, it was the country's 22nd-best-selling computer game of 1997. The following year, Quake II secured fifth place on PC Data's charts for January and February 1998, then dropped to #8 in March and #9 in April. It remained in PC Data's top 20 for another two months, before exiting in July 1998. Quake II surpassed 850,000 units shipped to retailers by April 1998, and 900,000 by June. According to PC Data, Quake II was the United States' 14th-best-selling computer game during the January–November 1998 period. It ultimately secured 15th place for the full year, with sales of 279,536 copies and revenues of $12.6 million. GameDaily reported in January 1999 that Quake II's sales in the United States had reached 550,000 units; this number rose to 610,000 units by December of that year. Worldwide, Quake II sold over 1 million copies by 2002.
