= Richard Gray (game designer) =

American video game designer (1957–2026)

- Gray in 2017
- Born: November 15, 1957; New Haven, Connecticut, U.S.
- Died: October 13, 2026 (aged 68)
- Other name: Levelord
- Occupation: Level designer
- Employer: Levelord Games
- Known for: Level design in Duke Nukem 3D, Quake, Heavy Metal FAKK 2 and SiN video games
- Website: levelord.com (Archived)

Richard Gray (November 15, 1957 – October 13, 2026), also known as Levelord, was an American video game designer best known for designing levels for 3D video games. His works include levels for Duke Nukem 3D, on which he and Allen Blum were the two principal level designers, and SiN. During development of the expansion for Duke Nukem 3D, he quit his position at 3D Realms to co-found the company that became Ritual Entertainment. He spent his later years in Moscow.

== Early life ==
Richard Bailey Gray was born in New Haven, Connecticut, on November 15, 1957. In 1976, he joined the United States Navy, serving aboard the supply ship USS Detroit (AOE-4) and later as an ocean systems technician in Alaska and Virginia, where his duties included tracking Soviet submarines. After leaving the Navy he worked as a programmer, writing corporate software, studying computer engineering and working in the aerospace industry. He began designing levels for Doom in his thirties; in 1994 he released a collection of maps, GrayDOOM, on CompuServe and sent his work to id Software. This led to an invitation to join Q Studios to work on Blood, although none of his levels for that game made it into the final release.

== Career ==
Gray in 1997

Gray was known for hiding difficult-to-find Easter eggs in his levels in the form of hidden messages. Some of these can only be found by viewing the level in an editor program or cheating in the game, with a message such as "You're not supposed to be here! - Levelord". Duke Nukem 3D is known for having many such messages written on walls in some levels. His chosen pseudonym dates back to his early work on what became Blood starting in September 1994, based on how he signed off e-mails to designer Nick Newhard. His transfer to the Duke Nukem 3D team in March 1995 was one of the causes of the strain that led to Blood being published by GT Interactive over 3D Realms.

He created the first suspended platform (also known as "void") deathmatch, called HIPDM1 or "The Edge of Oblivion", for the Quake add-on pack Scourge of Armagon. This "islands in space" design of this multiplayer map became a staple in Quake III Arena, including its map The Longest Yard, and in many other deathmatch games. He created the first player-the-size-of-a-rat deathmatch level with the release of SPRY or "Behind Zee Bookcase" for SiN. He contributed to the level design in other video games including Quake: The Offering, Half-Life: Opposing Force, and Counter-Strike: Condition Zero.

With MumboJumbo's acquisition of Ritual and its transition from big-budget projects (like Sin Episodes: Emergence) to casual gaming, he became involved with smaller, more quickly developed and experimental games.

In 2009, he conceived, designed and developed a hidden object game called Becky Brogan - The Mystery of Meane Manor, using the game programming language BlitzMax.

== Later life and death ==
Gray met his future wife, Olga, at a game developers' conference in Moscow in 2005. He moved to Russia in the early 2010s and settled in Moscow, where he taught English and advised young developers. In 2016 he and Allen Blum returned to Duke Nukem 3D to create a new episode for Duke Nukem 3D: 20th Anniversary World Tour; one of his levels, "Red Ruckus", is set in Moscow. He advised Mundfish during the development of Atomic Heart and received a special thanks in the game's credits. He also worked as creative director for the Russian company RUVDS on the Telegram arcade game Atomny Graf.

Gray died on October 13, 2026, at the age of 68. His death was announced by his wife on the same day.
