= Quake II engine =

Video game engine

- A screenshot of Quake II
- Developers: id Software (John Carmack, John Cash, and Brian Hook)
- Final release: 3.21 / December 22, 2001; 24 years ago
- Written in: C, Assembly (for software rendering & optimization)
- Platform: Windows, Macintosh, Linux, Amiga, Nintendo 64, Dreamcast, Xbox, PlayStation 2
- Predecessor: Quake engine
- Successor: id Tech 3, GoldSrc in part
- License: GNU GPL-2.0-or-later
- Website: www.idsoftware.com/business/idtech2/
- Repository: github.com/id-Software/Quake-2

id Tech 2, originally known as the Quake II engine, is a game engine developed by id Software for use in their 1997 first-person shooter Quake II. Like its predecessor, the Quake engine, the Quake II engine was also licensed to other developers, appearing in several other games of the era, before being made freely available under the terms of the GNU General Public License on December 22, 2001.

== Engine features ==
One of the engine's most notable features was out-of-the-box support for hardware-accelerated graphics, specifically OpenGL, along with the traditional software renderer. Another feature was the subdivision of some of the components into shared libraries. This allowed both software and OpenGL renderers, which were selected by loading and unloading separate libraries. Libraries were also used for the game logic, with consequences including:

- Since they were compiled for specific platforms, instead of an interpreter, they could run faster than Quake's solution, which was to run the game logic (QuakeC) in a limited interpreter.
- id could release the source code to allow modifications while keeping the remainder of the engine proprietary.

As with previous id Software engines, level geometry used binary space partitioning, and would be authored using constructive solid geometry like in the Quake engine. The level environments were lit using lightmaps, a method in which light data for each surface is precalculated (this time, via a radiosity method) and stored as an image, which is then overlaid onto the level geometry and used to determine the light intensity each 3D model should receive, but not its direction.

== Games using the Quake II engine ==
=== Games using a proprietary license ===
Year	Title	Developer
1997	Quake II	id Software
1998	Quake II Mission Pack: The Reckoning	Xatrix Entertainment
1998	Quake II Mission Pack: Ground Zero	Rogue Entertainment
1998	Zaero (unofficial expansion for Quake II)	Team Evolve
1998	Juggernaut: The New Story (unofficial expansion for Quake II)	Canopy Games
1998	Heretic II	Raven Software
1998	SiN	Ritual Entertainment
1999	Sin Mission Pack: Wages of Sin	2015
1999	Kingpin: Life of Crime	Xatrix Entertainment
2000	Soldier of Fortune	Raven Software
2000	Daikatana	Ion Storm
2001	Anachronox	Ion Storm

=== Games based on the GPL source release ===
Year	Title	Developer
2000	D-Day: Normandy	D-Day: Normandy Team
2003	UFO: Alien Invasion	UFO: Alien Invasion Team
2008	Gravity Bone	Blendo Games
2012	Warsow	Warsow Team
2012	Thirty Flights of Loving	Blendo Games
2017	Alien Arena: Warriors of Mars	COR Entertainment, LLC
2017	Quetoo	Quetoo Team
2019	Warfork	Warfork Team

== Ports ==
- Jake2 – a Java port of the Quake II engine's GPL release. It has since been used by Sun as an example of Java Web Start capabilities for games distribution over the Internet. In 2006, it was used to experiment playing 3D games with eye tracking. The performance of Jake2 is on par with the original C version.
- Quake2Forge – one of the earliest community produced source ports.
- Quake2xp – a port of Quake II to modern operating systems.
- KMQuake2 – an upgraded engine for Quake II.
- Quake2maX – OpenGL focused source port.
- Quake 2 Evolved – early graphically enhanced game engine.
- Quetoo (formerly Quake2World) – multiplayer focused port derived from Quake2Forge.
- Berserker@Quake2 – graphically enhanced Quake II port.
- Yamagi Quake II – a port of Quake II to modern systems which aims to preserve the original gameplay.
- vkQuake2 – the original Quake II engine with additional Vulkan renderer created by Krzysztof Kondrak, a programmer from Poland. It was originally released in December 2018 under the GPLv2.
- CRX Engine – custom version for CodeRED: Alien Arena.
- Qfusion – a modification of the GPL version of the engine. The engine was used in the 2012 game Warsow.
- Q2Pro – a mutliplayer oriented port, which was also used as the basis for Quake II RTX.
- R1Q2 – another multiplayer focused port.
- DirectQII – DirectX oriented source port.
- Fruitz of Dojo – a source port aimed at Mac OS X.
- Q2DOS – a backport of the game to MS-DOS.

== See also ==
- List of game engines
- Quake engine
- Id Tech 3
- Id Tech 4
- Id Tech 5
- Id Tech 6
- First-person shooter engine
- Quake modding
