= Matthias Worch =

German video game designer and computer graphics artist

- Born: 1976 (age 48–49); Germany
- Occupation(s): Video game designer, computer graphics artist
- Notable work: Dead Space 2 Mafia III; Fortnite

Matthias Worch (born 1976) is a German video game designer and computer graphics artist. He started out creating custom Doom and Quake levels. Matthias entered the computer game industry in 1998 when he moved to Dallas, Texas to work on Ritual Entertainment's 3D First Person Shooter SiN. He has since contributed to various 3D action games. Matthias has spoken at the Game Developers Conference and the IGDA. Matthias is working at Epic Games as a Design Lead on the special projects group.

== Games worked on ==
- SiN – Windows (1998)
- Unreal Mission Pack - Return to NaPali – Windows, Mac OS (1999)
- The Wheel of Time – Windows (1999)
- Unreal 2 – Windows (2003)
- Star Wars Rogue Squadron III: Rebel Strike – GameCube (2003)
- Lair – PlayStation 3 (2007)
- Dead Space 2 – Windows, Xbox 360, PlayStation 3 (2011)
- Star Wars 1313 - (Cancelled) (2013)
- Unreal Engine (2014)
- Mafia III - Windows, Xbox One, PlayStation 4 (2016)
- Fortnite (2017)
- Lego Fortnite (2023)
