= Sin: The Movie =

Japanese original video animation

- Australian DVD cover art

Sin：ザ・ムービー (Sin: Za mūbī)
- Genre: Action, cyberpunk, horror
- Original video animation
- Directed by: Yasunori Urata
- Produced by: Yasuhito Yamaki; Andrew Orjuela
- Written by: Ryōma Kaneko; Kensei Date
- Music by: Masamichi Amano
- Studio: Phoenix Entertainment
- Licensed by: AUS: Madman Entertainment; NA: ADV Films
- Released: October 24, 2000
- Runtime: 60 minutes
- icon

Sin: The Movie (Japanese: Sin：ザ・ムービー, Hepburn: Sin: Za mūbī) is a Japanese adult animated cyberpunk action horror film original video animation released in 2000 by ADV Films, adapted from the game of the same title.

== Premise ==
In the year 2027, the city of Freeport is on the verge of governmental collapse brought about by the creation of private industry security. John Blade, the cybernetic leader of the HARDCORPS, investigates a rash of mysterious kidnappings within the city. John runs across Elexis Sinclaire, brilliant biochemist whose company makes a drug called U4. Over the course of the investigation, the victims are revealed to be experiments for this mysterious drug and its mutagenic effects. Now, John must stop Elexis before she unleashes her mutagenic research on Freeport.

== Cast ==
English cast

- Colonel Blade - Markham Anderson
- Jennifer Armack - Shelley Calene-Black
- Jason Armack - Chris Patton
- Elexis Sinclaire - Sian Taylor
- Vincenzo Manchini - Andy McAvin
- Kait Palmer - LaTeace Towns-Cuellar
- Tim Perko - Vic Mignogna
- Elyse Stewart - Danielle Kimball
- Lorenzo Vitello - Ted Pfister
- Dr. Daniel Greenwall - David Parker
- Tina Vasant - Jocelyn Donegan
- Skycity Announcer/Mutant Elyse - Hilary Haag
- Blade's Father - Robert Vellani
- Hardcorps Commander/Cop 3/SinTEK Executive - Jason Douglas
- Cop 1/Dispatcher 1/SinTEK Executive - John Swasey
- Cop 2/Dispatcher 2/Elyse's Dad - Lew Temple
- Cop 4/SinTEK Executive/Reporter - Matt Kelley
- Dispatcher 2/Elyse's Mom - Kelly Mansion
- Dispatcher 4/Ensign - Christopher Bourque
- Guard/Medic - Randy Sparks
- Priest - Mike Kleinhenz

== Production ==
Texas-based companies A.D. Vision and Ritual Entertainment first made contact at the Electronic Entertainment Expo in 1998. At the time, Ritual had developed the first-person shooter Sin which had garnered significant hype and coverage within the game industry. This spurred dialogue between the two companies about turning the game into an anime movie, which was met with enthusiasm. Phoenix Entertainment, a studio that gained fame with Giant Robo: The Day the Earth Stood Still and Super Atragon, was hired to develop a story and animate it. Due to production and story issues, the film was delayed to the point it missed the launch of Sin. The film was produced on a budget of under $500,000.

== Release ==
Sin: The Movie was released on VHS and DVD in 2000. The special edition DVD was released in 2003 with more extra features. In 2009, the film was re-released on DVD.
