= 25 to Life =

2006 video game

- North American PlayStation 2 box art
- Developers: Avalanche Software; Ritual Entertainment
- Publisher: Eidos Interactive
- Platforms: PlayStation 2, Xbox, Windows
- Release: NA: January 18, 2006; EU: June 1, 2007 (PS2); AU: June 7, 2007 (PS2)
- Genre: Third-person shooter
- Modes: Single-player, multiplayer

25 to Life is a third-person shooter video game developed by Avalanche Software and Ritual Entertainment and published by Eidos Interactive for Microsoft Windows, PlayStation 2 and Xbox in 2006.

Set in a modern environment, the game allows the player to play as both a cop and a gangster, at different times, in a "cops and robbers"-style game. The game can be played online with up to 16 players using the network adaptor for the PS2 and through Xbox Live for the Xbox, and there is online play for the Windows version as well. While Xbox Live was shut down in 2010, 25 to Life is now playable online using replacement online servers for the original Xbox called Insignia. On purchasing the Windows version, customers would also obtain a free "Street Warriors" playing card, which included a featured character from the game itself.

== Plot ==
The game is about a man named Freeze, his friend Shaun Calderon, and police officer Lester Williams in the fictional city of Las Ruinas. Freeze commits crimes with Shaun to get money, which he spends for his family, while Williams is trying to stop the organized crime and across the city.

One night upon returning home, his wife confronts him about these actions. Saying they are a bad influence to their son Darnell, she wants him to stop. After an argument, he agrees. The next day, he tells Shaun he wants out of the game. Shaun levels a gun on Freeze, informing him that he must do one last job, a narcotics trade.

At the deal, Freeze finds the Colombian drug dealers dead and corrupt police officer Maria Mendoza waiting for him. Freeze flees with the police in pursuit and loses them, but loses his money in the process. It is then revealed that Mendoza has been working with Shaun.

The 2nd Street D-Boys realize Freeze wants out of the gang and he has to avoid both his former gang and the police. Shaun also kidnaps Freeze's wife and son for ransom for the money lost in the botched deal. To pay this ransom, he robs a bank. After a gun fight against police, he reaches his getaway car, only to be arrested by Maria.

Meanwhile, Mendoza informs Williams of Shaun. They look for Shaun in his house, but get caught in a gun fight. Williams finds evidence and goes to a club to find Shaun, chasing him to the subway. The chase ends with Williams arresting Shaun, but Mendoza kills him and tells Shaun to leave for Mexico.

Shaun goes to Tijuana and fights his way to a local club called "The Curtains Club". He robs a casino, fights security, and goes to a wealthy man named Saragosa in his penthouse, whom he kills.

Freeze breaks out of jail and gets new clothes at the mall while being chased by the police. He kills Mendoza in the mall and hunts down Shaun, now a wealthy drug kingpin. After engaging Shaun in a shootout with Freeze winning, he kills Shaun by stepping on his neck until he suffocates. Now reunited with his son, though his wife is still missing, the final scene shows Freeze telling Darnell, "From now on, it's just you and me against the world. Now let's do this", as a large number of police officers arrive, with Freeze picking up a gun and pointing it at the police.

== Reception ==
Reception

Aggregate score
Aggregator	Score		
Aggregator	PC	PS2	Xbox
Metacritic	39/100	39/100	41/100

Review scores
Publication	Score		
Publication	PC	PS2	Xbox
1Up.com	N/A	D−	D−
Edge	2/10	2/10	2/10
Game Informer	N/A	5.75/10	5.75/10
GameSpot	5.6/10	5.7/10	5.7/10
GameSpy	N/A	1.5/5	1.5/5
GameZone	8/10	N/A	N/A
IGN	3.3/10	3/10	3.1/10
Official U.S. PlayStation Magazine	N/A	1/5	N/A
Official Xbox Magazine (US)	N/A	N/A	2/10
PC Gamer (US)	30%	N/A	N/A
Detroit Free Press	N/A	1/4	N/A
USA Today	4/10	4/10	4/10

25 to Life received "unfavorable" reviews on all platforms according to video game review aggregator Metacritic.

Hyper's Maurice Branscombe commented that the game's soundtrack was okay only "if you like rap." However, he criticised the game as "absolutely unadulterated bullshit."

USA Today gave the game a score of four stars out of ten and stated that its only strong quality "is a decent multiplayer mode. Most of the action is team-based, allowing you to choose between police or thugs. Players can choose to rob a location and return the stash to their home turf, raid a criminal hangout, or engage in an all-out deathmatch. Freeze's goal at the start of this story was to get out of the "game." Five minutes slogging through this shooter will have players wanting the same."

The A.V. Club gave it a D+ and called it "a half-baked copy of someone's urban nightmare."

Detroit Free Press gave the PS2 version one star out of four and stated that it "lacks everything that would make it new, innovative or just plain fun. The graphics are really muddy and sub-par. The controls seem to be a bit confusing."
