= 2015 (company) =

American video game developer

2015, Inc.
- Company type: Private
- Industry: Video games
- Founded: May 1997; 29 years ago
- Founder: Tom Kudirka
- Headquarters: Tulsa, Oklahoma, US
- Key people: Tom Kudirka (president)
- Products: Sin Mission Pack: Wages of Sin; Medal of Honor: Allied Assault; Men of Valor
- Number of employees: 25 (2010)
- Divisions: Trainwreck Studios; Tornado Studios

2015, Inc. was an American video game developer based in Tulsa, Oklahoma. Tom Kudirka founded the company in May 1997, using connections with Ritual Entertainment to develop Sin Mission Pack: Wages of Sin (1999). It further developed Medal of Honor: Allied Assault (2002), after which the majority of the development team left for Infinity Ward, and Men of Valor (2004). A number of smaller games were developed through Trainwreck Studios (founded in 2000) and Tornado Studios (founded in 2008), including Laser Arena (2000), Time Ace (2007), and Project Runway (2010).

== History ==
Tom Kudirka, originally from Omaha, Nebraska, and an alumnus of Bellevue West High School, had studied business information systems and electronics before moving to Tulsa to work for Lucent Technologies as a field engineer. Thereafter, he had established multimedia companies, including one dealing with speech recognition. Because Kudirka "thought he was bored", he founded 2015 in Tulsa in May 1997. The name was said to have been chosen for an undisclosed "very significant" reason, although Kudirka later said he did not know what it meant. Kudirka recruited developers he had discovered online and had them relocate to Tulsa. The designer Zied Rieke was the first hire. Through Kudirka's connections with Ritual Entertainment and its CEO, 2015 came to develop Wages of Sin, an expansion pack for Ritual Entertainment's 1998 game Sin. It was released in February 1999. On April 3, 2000, 2015 announced the opening of its Trainwreck Studios division for budget-price games with a wider target audience. The first game therein, Laser Arena, was designed to be playable by Kudirka's three-year-old son and released in September 2000. 2015 was simultaneously working on its third game, Heavy Gear Extreme. The company grew to 15 people, requiring it to expand its office space at 8282 South Memorial Drive. The second Trainwreck Studios game, CIA Operative: Solo Missions, was released in May 2001.

2015 was reported as developing Half-Life: Hostile Takeover as an expansion for Half-Life in November 1999. It was scheduled for release in August 2000 but canceled by the publisher Sierra Entertainment by this time. As Kudirka reported to id Software that he had been taken off a project, the studio referred him to the director Steven Spielberg. His company DreamWorks SKG had experimented with developing a personal computer follow-up to Medal of Honor but decided to work with an external partner instead. In May 2000, 2015 began work on what became Medal of Honor: Allied Assault. According to Kudirka, shortly before the release of Allied Assault, the studio director of development Vince Zampella began secretly meeting with Electronic Arts to establish a separate studio and take over most staff. Out of 27 employees, 20 had resigned by the end of the month. Zampella and Jason West founded Infinity Ward, which ultimately hired 22 former 2015 staffers. Rieke, who also left, said the development team had bonded but sought to work under a different management. In response to the departures, Kudirka filed a lawsuit against Zampella, which was settled when Activision bought a 30% stake in Infinity Ward. Allied Assault was a critical and commercial success, selling 1.5 million copies within a year.

In January 2003, Vivendi Universal Games announced Men of Valor as 2015's next game for Windows and the Xbox. By March, 2015 had grown to 39 people, with John Whitmore as the new director of development. Men of Valor, released in 2004, was not as commercially successful as Allied Assault and subsequent attempts to pitch games to publishers failed. The company laid off an unspecified number of staffers in March 2005, although Kudirka denied rumors that the company was closing. He soon dissolved 2015 and moved to Florida, returning to Tulsa when he realized he wanted to continue working on video games. Konami Digital Entertainment released Time Ace, developed under the Trainwreck Studios name, in June 2007.

On September 24, 2008, Kudirka announced that 2015 had received "several million dollars" in funding from private investors, with which it opened another division, Tornado Studios. The new studio started out with two people, including Kudirka, and sought to make casual games, including for the Wii. At the same time, 2015 was to continue making action games. By March 2009, Tornado Studios had 15 employees and was nearing the release of its first game, Powerbike, through Majesco. The game was released in April under the Trainwreck Studios name. Its first game was Project Runway, initially called World of Fashion until Atari signed to publish it and licensed the series's name. It was released in March 2010. In November, Tornado Studios released Fun with Death for iOS devices. Kudirka said that the rise of digital distribution allowed Tornado Studios to self-publish its games, aiming to release as many games as possible. A third game, Anomaly for personal computers and for the PlayStation 3 via PlayStation Network, was two-thirds-complete by this time and scheduled to be released by April 1, 2011. Tornado Studios had 25 employees, including contractors, at this time.

In April 2015, Nordic Games bought the Men of Valor intellectual property from 2015. By 2017, Kudirka had returned to Omaha and created vGolf, a mixed reality golf simulator.

== Games developed ==
Year	Title	Publisher(s)	Platform(s)
1999	Sin Mission Pack: Wages of Sin	Activision	Windows
2002	Medal of Honor: Allied Assault	Electronic Arts	Mac OS X, Windows
2004	Men of Valor	Vivendi Universal Games	Windows, Xbox

=== Trainwreck Studios ===
Year	Title	Publisher(s)	Platform(s)
2000	Laser Arena	ValuSoft	Windows
2001	CIA Operative: Solo Missions	ValuSoft	Windows
2007	Time Ace	Konami Digital Entertainment	Nintendo DS
2009	Powerbike	Majesco	Nintendo DS

=== Tornado Studios ===
Year	Title	Publisher(s)	Platform(s)
2010	Project Runway	Atari	Wii, Windows
2010	Fun with Death	Tornado Studios	iOS

=== Canceled ===
- Heavy Gear Extreme
- Half-Life: Hostile Takeover
