= Project Runway (video game) =

2010 video game

- Developer: Tornado Studios
- Publisher: Atari, Inc.
- Platform: Wii
- Release: Wii: NA: March 2, 2010; AU: June 17, 2010; EU: June 18, 2010; Windows: WW: March 9, 2010
- Genre: Life simulation
- Mode: Single-player

Project Runway is a 2010 video game published by Atari, Inc. for Nintendo Wii and Microsoft Windows. It is based on the Project Runway reality television series.

== Gameplay ==
In Project Runway, players take on a triple role: fashion designer, stylist, and model. The tasks players with assembling outfits, applying makeup, and strutting down the runway. The runway walk requires players to swing the Wii remote and nunchuk in sync with on-screen prompts.

== Development ==
The game was announced in October 2009. The title cost $2 million to $5 million to develop and was released in March 2010 to coincide with a new season of the television series.

== Reception ==
Reception

Review scores
| Publication | Score |
|---|---|
| The Bolton News | 4/5 |
| Coventry Telegraph | 2/5 |
| Common Sense Media | 3/5 |

GameZone said "With so little to do in Project Runway, it's hard to recommend the title to anyone. The graphics are beyond outdated and give off the impression of the prehistoric age of video games. The music is ungodly annoying and the presentation gives off the vibes that Atari is trying to make a quick buck"
