= Star Wars 1313 =

Unreleased Star Wars action-adventure video game

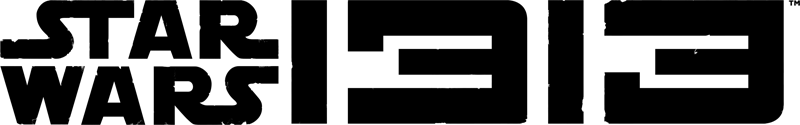
- Developer: LucasArts
- Publisher: LucasArts
- Director: Dominic Robilliard
- Designer: Matthias Worch
- Engine: Unreal Engine 3
- Platforms: Windows, PlayStation 4, Xbox One
- Release: Unreleased
- Genre: Action-adventure

Star Wars 1313 is a cancelled action-adventure video game that was under development by LucasArts. The game would take a more mature, gritty direction compared to past Star Wars video games and, like 2002's Star Wars: Bounty Hunter, would emphasize fast-paced gadget and weapon-based combat using tools exclusive to bounty hunters rather than Force and lightsaber based combat.

On April 3, 2013, it was announced that The Walt Disney Company had ceased internal development of all LucasArts projects, including Star Wars 1313. At the time, a LucasArts representative indicated that the game may be revived through a licensing deal with an outside studio, but until then Star Wars 1313 would remain on hold.

== Plot ==
Star Wars 1313 was supposed to revolve around Boba Fett in his early adulthood, navigating past the scum of civilization in an underground area of Coruscant known as Level 1313.

== Development ==
While being developed in-house by LucasArts, Star Wars 1313 was undergoing an integrated development approach that involved Industrial Light & Magic, Lucasfilm Animation and Skywalker Sound. The game's title was trademarked in May 2012, and the game was announced later that month by LucasArts. The game was officially revealed at E3 2012 the following month. Spike TV broadcast a sneak peek on June 4 that showed exclusive gameplay footage.

Star Wars creator George Lucas was directly involved with development. Though he gave the 1313 team more access to the Star Wars universe, he also began to switch characters and rewrite the story based on what he felt would be more fitting for the game. Ex-LucasArts staff describe Lucas as someone who cared deeply about telling stories, but did not know much about the game development process, with one former developer adding: "One of the problems of working in a film company—[Lucas] is used to being able to change his mind, he didn't really have a capacity for understanding how damaging and difficult to deal with these changes were."

It was being developed on top of Unreal Engine 3, as shown in the latest Developer Diary called "Descent to the Underworld". The diary video shows the game running in 64-bit mode with the Direct3D 11 rendering path.

On March 1, 2013, it was reported that the game had been "on hold" ever since The Walt Disney Company's purchase of Lucasfilm. However, a LucasArts representative reported that Star Wars 1313 was continuing production.

On April 3, 2013, it was announced that The Walt Disney Company had ceased internal development at LucasArts and laid off its staff, except a skeleton crew of less than 10 employees which would allow LucasArts to remain open as a licensor. As a result, all projects were shut down, including Star Wars 1313. A Lucasfilm representative stated: "After evaluating our position in the games market, we've decided to shift LucasArts from an internal development to a licensing model, minimizing the company's risk while achieving a broader portfolio of quality Star Wars games. As a result of this change, we've had layoffs across the organization." It is possible that Star Wars 1313 may resume development by an external developer, but until that happens Star Wars 1313 remains shelved. Following the halting of internal development at LucasArts, Disney announced an exclusive deal with Electronic Arts to produce Star Wars games for the core gaming market. However, Disney Interactive Studios retained the ability to develop, and LucasArts retained the ability to license the franchise for the casual gaming market. When asked whether Electronic Arts would continue Star Wars 1313 and Star Wars: First Assault, a representative for the company stated, "We are not announcing any specific titles at this time."

In September 2013, while speaking at the British Academy of Film and Television Arts, Lucasfilm chief technology strategy officer Kim Libreri demonstrated a video of motion capture being processed in real-time by the Star Wars 1313 engine and its assets. Using the game's capacities as an example, Libreri suggested that cinematic post-processing might eventually be supplemented or superseded by rendering technologies developed for video games.

Disney chose not to renew the trademark for Star Wars 1313 in the beginning of 2014, resulting in the United States Patent and Trademark Office considering the trademark abandoned.

In a December 2015 interview with /Film, Lucasfilm head Kathleen Kennedy stated the concept art for the game was "gold" and that it was "something we're spending a lot of time looking at, pouring through [sic], discussing, and we may very well develop those things further."

The game remains on hold as of 2026, although many assume it has been canceled. In 2022, further gameplay leaked on YouTube showcasing a small amount of Boba Fett gameplay.

== Legacy ==
Level 1313 appears in more recent Star Wars media such as The Clone Wars, in which it is visited by Ahsoka Tano, and Star Wars Adventures: Return to Vader's Castle.

== See also ==
- Star Wars: Underworld
