= Men of Valor =

2004 video game

- Developer: 2015
- Publisher: Vivendi Universal Games (Note: Released in PAL regions under the Sierra Entertainment brand name.)
- Director: John Whitmore
- Designer: Kris Jackson
- Programmer: Mike Ramsey
- Artists: Curtis Cannell; Matthew A. Campbell
- Composer: Inon Zur
- Engine: Unreal Engine 2
- Platforms: Xbox, Windows
- Release: Xbox: NA: October 19, 2004; PAL: November 5, 2004; Windows: NA: October 26, 2004; PAL: November 12, 2004
- Genre: First-person shooter
- Modes: Single-player, multiplayer

Men of Valor is a first-person shooter video game developed by 2015 and published by Vivendi Universal Games for the Microsoft Windows and Xbox platforms. Men of Valor is based on the Unreal Engine 2 and simulates infantry combat during the Vietnam War, more specifically, the Tet Offensive in 1968. The game was released in 2004 to mostly positive reviews.

== Plot ==
The story of Men of Valor follows Dean Shepard and his squad of Marines from the 3rd Battalion of the 3rd Marine Division from 1965 to 1968, through thirteen missions during the Vietnam War in which he takes part in historical events such are Operation Starlite, battle of Ho Bo Woods and battles of Huế and Khe Sanh during the Tet Offensive. In historically-based scenarios, the player assumes a variety of roles in which they man the door gun on a Huey and Sikorsky helicopters, ride in armored vehicle, steer a riverboat along enemy-infested shores, battle their way through enemy tunnel complexes, and call down artillery fire and close air support as a forward observer. Mission types include pilot rescues, recon patrols, POW rescue, and search-and-destroy ops, all typical objectives throughout the war. Between missions are film clips showcasing the real war, a similar approach to most WWII games at the time.

== Development ==
Men of Valor was developed by 2015 shortly after work finished on Medal of Honor: Allied Assault.

== Reception ==
Reception

Aggregate score
Aggregator	Score	
Aggregator	PC	Xbox
Metacritic	71/100	73/100

Review scores
Publication	Score	
Publication	PC	Xbox
Computer Games Magazine	2.5/5	N/A
Computer Gaming World	3.5/5	N/A
Electronic Gaming Monthly	N/A	6.5/10
Eurogamer	N/A	6/10
Game Informer	N/A	7.75/10
GamePro	3.5/5	3.5/5
GameRevolution	C+	C+
GameSpot	7.9/10	7.9/10
GameSpy	3.5/5	3.5/5
GameZone	8.8/10	7.9/10
IGN	6.8/10	7.8/10
Official Xbox Magazine (US)	N/A	6.8/10
PC Gamer (US)	58%	N/A
The Sydney Morning Herald	3/5	3/5

The game received "mixed or average reviews" on both platforms according to the review aggregation website Metacritic, with 73/100 for Xbox and 71/100 for Microsoft Windows. The game was praised for its story, character development, setting, gameplay, and atmosphere, but was also criticized for its voice acting, unreliable checkpoint system, and frequent difficulty spikes.

Eurogamer gave the title 6/10, stating: "The net result for the makers of Medal Of Honor is a game that's a pleasantly unpleasant diversion from old WW2 glories, yet evidently not the triple A game Vivendi Universal would have been hoping for. Still, Men Of Valor is a solid, enjoyable and challenging Vietnam take on the sort of scripted cinematic shooters that the public evidently love to death."

IGN gave the PC version 6.8/10 and the Xbox version 7.8/10.
