= Time Ace =

2007 video game

- Box art of Time Ace
- Developer: Trainwreck Studios
- Publisher: Konami
- Platform: Nintendo DS
- Release: NA: June 12, 2007
- Genre: Combat flight simulator
- Modes: Single-player, multiplayer

Time Ace is an aerial combat game developed for the Nintendo DS by Trainwreck Studios and published by Konami. The game was released on June 12, 2007. Time Ace is based on the concept that an eccentric inventor from 1914, Dr. Hugo Clock, has formed a plan to travel forward in time to end World War I, but the evil Dr. Klaus Scythe uses the time machine to further his own plan for world domination. The player's goal is to stop Scythe's scheme.

The game is similar in concept to Konami's 1981 arcade game Time Pilot.

== Story ==
In 1914, eccentric scientist Dr. Hugo Clock created a time machine with the plans of going back in time and preventing World War I from happening and preventing millions of needless deaths. However, his sneaky assistant, Dr. Klaus Scythe, hijacks his time machine with a plan to acquire an arsenal of history's most powerful weapons in order to rule the world.

== Reception ==
Reception

Aggregate score
Aggregator	Score
Metacritic	52/100

Review scores
Publication	Score
GameSpy	2.5/5
GamesRadar+	2/5
GameZone	5.5/10
IGN	5.9/10
Nintendojo	6.6/10

Time Ace received mixed reviews from critics upon release. On Metacritic, the game holds a score of 52/100 based on 19 reviews, indicating "mixed or average reviews".
