= Heavy Metal: F.A.K.K. 2 =

2000 video game

- Developer: Ritual Entertainment
- Publishers: WW: Gathering of Developers; EU: Take-Two Interactive
- Engine: id Tech 3
- Platforms: Windows, Mac OS, Linux
- Release: Windows: NA: August 1, 2000; EU: September 22, 2000; Mac OS: NA: October 30, 2000; Linux: NA: November 14, 2001
- Genres: Third-person shooter, action-adventure
- Mode: Single-player

Heavy Metal: F.A.K.K. 2 is a third-person shooter video game developed by Ritual Entertainment and released for Microsoft Windows in 2000. The sequel to the Heavy Metal 2000 animated film, it stars Julie in her quest to save her home planet of Eden from GITH, an ancient entity seeking to conquer the universe. Using a variety of weapons, Julie must fight off GITH's forces while at the same time uncovering a secret hidden deep within the planet.

F.A.K.K. 2 allows players to pair up and use two weapons at the same time depending on the situation. Players can block enemy attacks and execute powerful combo moves to deal deadly blows to their enemies. The game uses the Quake III Arena engine (modified with Ritual's ÜberTools) and combines action with puzzle-solving. The game was ported to Linux by Loki Software, who had previously ported Quake III Arena to Linux.

== Gameplay ==
The game contains various references to Goddess-cults. Much of the imagery surrounding GITH satirizes ad campaigns (the Recruiter who spawns Swarmers in the game periodically exhorts his victims in a cheery voice to 'Join us' and claims to promote 'Peace' and 'Love'). The Fleshbinders are cyborgs who communicate by radio and have various weapons integral to their bodies. Furthermore, if Julie wounds any Eden citizen she automatically fails in her mission. The game is somewhat more narrative-driven and less strident than some of Heavy Metal's other creations or associated works.

The heroine, Julie, was inspired by Julie Strain, who provided the voice for the heroine in the film and game.

== Plot ==
F.A.K.K. 2 takes place 30 years after the events of Heavy Metal 2000.

F.A.K.K. 2 stands for "Federation-Assigned Ketogenic Killzone to the second level", and is the alias both of the heroine, Julie, and also her homeworld. Before the game begins, we are told that Julie has previously killed a tyrant and "would-be God" named Lord Tyler (during the events of Heavy Metal 2000), and brought the remnant of her people to a planet called Eden. The people of Eden have made a startling discovery: the waters of the planet grant an eternal life to those who drink it, and they have restored ti-rural paradise, pasturing 'creepers' (large bull-like creatures) and peacefully going about their business.

This planet is camouflaged by a F.A.K.K. 2 beacon and made to look like a biohazard-strewn wasteland in the hope that it will remain hidden from any threat. However, a creature named Gith, who appears only as a disembodied cybernetic head, runs a hyper-corporation called GITH Industries whose "employees" are little more than slaves. He scavenges the universe in a ship composed of three-quarters of a planet, and is headed for a place called Na'ChThraThull, or the "place of the soft machines", which turns out to be Eden.

Julie resides in the town of Eden with her sister Kerrie, who is pregnant. She interacts with various citizens, including her brother-in-law, Germain St. Germain. Peace is suddenly disturbed by the appearance of hostile insect-like creatures called Vymishes. Julie springs into combat, killing many of the creatures and saving a pregnant creeper in the process. She also kills a Vymish Mama, a queen-like Vymish. Afterward, Julie heads into town and meets Otto, the town's gunsmith, who she gives a glowing green asteroid to for examination. Another asteroid knocks out the shield, and Julie, accompanied by Jared and Eon, is tasked with resetting the shield generator. Underground, Julie's accomplices are killed by creatures called Grawlix, and she is forced to continue alone. She eventually resets the shield generator, but is too late to discover that GITH has arrived, and he teleports troops in to destroy the generator.

Julie returns to town to find it under siege by GITH's forces. Many citizens are dead, while others are hypnotized. Julie finds Otto, who has recovered a mysterious object from the asteroid. It turns out to be a message for Julie from the "Belphigoreans", warning her that Gith is seeking the "Heart of the We". Otto tells Julie about the Heart of the We, and tasks her with finding a native of Eden named Gruff. Julie leaves the besieged Eden, then journeys through the Mooagly swamps to find Gruff, who unlocks the path to the Temple of the We for her. She then overcomes the four challenges of the We before entering the final temple where the Heart of the We is kept. However, GITH is waiting for her, and he steals the Heart and uses it to bring Lord Tyler back to life, so he could have his revenge on Julie. However, Julie fights and kills Lord Tyler and wins the Heart, banishing GITH. She returns to town only to find out that her pregnant sister is kidnapped by GITH, who returns in a giant space station.

== Reception ==
Reception

Aggregate score
Aggregator	Score
Metacritic	78/100

Review scores
Publication	Score
AllGame	3.5/5
CNET Gamecenter	9/10
Computer Games Strategy Plus	4/5
Computer Gaming World	3.5/5
Edge	7/10
Eurogamer	7/10
Game Informer	6.75/10
GameRevolution	B+
GameSpot	6.7/10
GameSpy	84%
IGN	8/10
MacLife	(Mac) "F.A."
Next Generation	3/5
PC Gamer (US)	90%

The game received "generally favorable reviews" according to the review aggregation website Metacritic. Jim Preston of NextGen said of the game and its protagonist, "While beautiful to look at and fun to play with, she's not ready for a serious commitment."

GamePro said that the game "will give you a good dose of fun while you're playing, although it is a bit short and there isn't any multiplayer to extend the game value. Still, the graphics and level design make for some satisfying eye candy, and the gameplay strikes a sweet balance between the typical run and gun shooters, 3D platformers, and action adventures." (Note: GamePro gave the game two 4.5/5 scores for graphics and fun factor, 3/5 for sound, and 4/5 for control.) GameZone gave the game nine out of ten, saying, "In-game cinematics, challenging puzzles, plenty of weapons, hordes of bad guys, sprawling landscapes, and beautiful women, what more could you want?"

The game sold 44,000 units in the U.S. by October 2001.

Game designer Tom Mustaine tweeted in July 2015 that he had been trying to get F.A.K.K. 2 re-released for years but was unable to do so due to copyright issues.
