= Warsow (video game) =

- Developer: Warsow Team
- Publisher: Chasseur de Bots
- Engine: Qfusion
- Platforms: Microsoft Windows, macOS, Linux
- Release: 28 July 2012 (version 1.0); 8 June 2014 (version 1.51); 30 November 2015 (version 2.0); 28 March 2016 (version 2.1); 21 December 2017 (version 2.1.2)
- Genre: First-person shooter
- Modes: Single-player, multiplayer

Warsow, also stylized as War§ow, is an open source first-person shooter video game.

== Development ==
Warsow was first publicly released on 8 June 2005 as an alpha version. The stable version 1.0 was released on 28 July 2012, after 7 years of development.

Warsow's codebase is free and open source software, distributed under the terms of the GPLv2 license; it is built upon Qfusion, an advanced modification of the Quake II engine. The artwork and other media were originally licensed under the proprietary Warsow Content License, which allowed the contributors of this media to use the work in a "personal portfolio" but not in any other game. Some assets were later released under the Creative Commons License Attribution-ShareAlike 4.0 International license, while others are under the non-free license CC-BY-ND.

Warsow is loosely based on the E-novel Chasseur de bots by Fabrice Demurger. The novel is the basis of the game's cyberpunk visual style, which is achieved by combining cel-shaded cartoon-like graphics with dark, flashy and dirty textures. Since visual clarity is important in maintaining competitive gameplay, Warsow tries to keep effects minimalistic, clear and visible.

The game was released on GOG.com on 18 October 2012. Warsow was submitted to Steam Greenlight on 9 February 2013, and was greenlit on 18 September.

At the end of 2016, the former main developer of Warsow posted: "2.6 this weekend". As of December 2025 version 2.6 of the game has still not been released.

The game was later forked under the title of Warfork, and is being actively developed as of April 2024 by a different development team.

== Gameplay ==
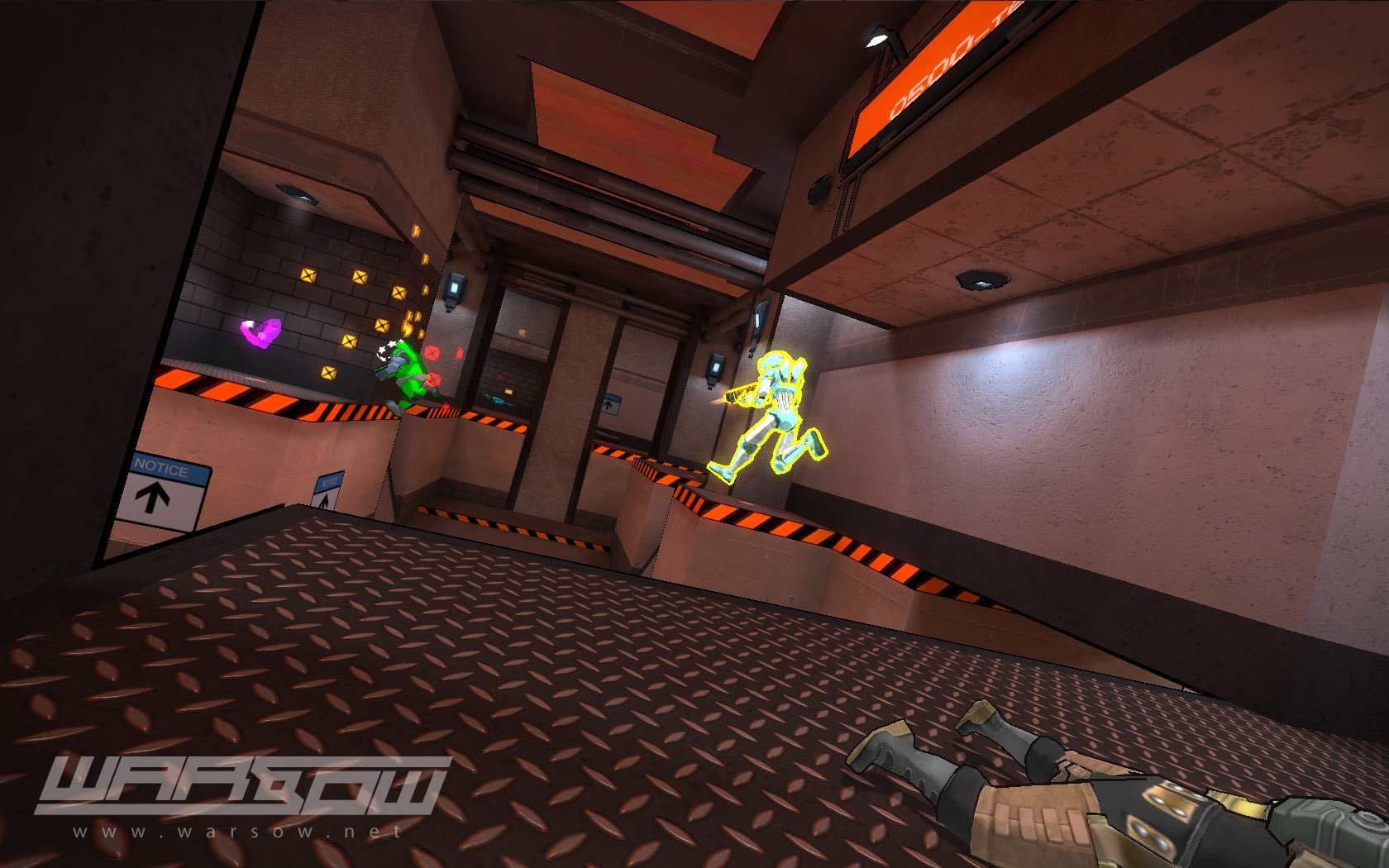
A screenshot showing Warsow's cel-shaded visual style

The competitive gameplay of Warsow focuses heavily on movement and trickjumps. Many of the tricks in Warsow originate from the Quake series, including circle-jumping, bunny hopping, strafe-jumping, double jumping, ramp-sliding, and rocket jumping, but Warsow also gives players the ability to dash, dodge or wall jump, tricks that were originally possible in Urban Terror. It uses a separate button for most of the special movements, making it easier to use them while doing other things at the same time. The various movement tricks combine to add an extra dimension to the gameplay; as the player's proficiency at moving increases, they can collect health, armor and weapons more quickly, and to overpower less capable enemies. The variety and flexibility of the physics have spawned an entire community dedicated to competing on the various Race maps that the game offers.

== Reception ==
=== Media coverage ===
Warsow was mentioned on the Australian television show Good Game on 14 April 2008 in a segment listing the best free to play games available. Warsow was reviewed with 8 of 10 by Linux Format in August 2011.

=== Competitive play ===
Warsow has been accepted as a competition-worthy game by several large online leagues such as the Electronic Sports League and ClanBase. In addition to acceptance by large leagues, many specialized Warsow cups have emerged. Well-known examples are Bamboocha, a Europe-based Warsow Duel Tourney, and ESW: Warsow, a Japanese Warsow cup. In 2007, several LAN tournaments featuring Warsow have emerged such as Crossfire Devotii Challenge 3, Warsow.nl LAN, and E-Sport Stadium 2007.

Additionally, Warsow has been featured on the German TV-channel GIGA Television several times, namely in GIGA eSports and its sub-shows Skill Sunday and Free For All and the Pay TV IPTV station GIGA 2, also produced by Turtle Entertainment.

== See also ==
- List of open source games
- List of free and open-source software packages
