= Nightlife.ca =

Canadian publisher

- Editor: Martine Desjardins
- Categories: Lifestyle magazine, culture, art, music, design entertainment and outings
- Frequency: Monthly
- Founded: 1999
- Company: NEWAD
- Country: Canada
- Language: French/English
- Website: Nightlife.ca
- ISSN: 1488-3910

Nightlife.ca publishes articles, reports, reviews and cultural information on outings, music, fashion, design, art, culture and entertainment. Each month, it publishes guides to living in Montreal in four different platforms: magazine, newsletter, website and social media.

The magazine is distributed in more than 40,000 copies (CCAB). The newsletter is sent twice a week to more than 20,000 subscribers and the website has 400,000 monthly page views.

Nightlife.ca has over 75 full and part-time employees and is a division of NEWAD.

== Staff ==
- Founder: Marc Pelletier
- Co-Founder: Nathalie Langlois
- Editor: Martine Desjardins
- Music editor: Olivier Lalande
- Urban culture editor: Michael-Oliver Harding
