= Alien Arena =

2004 video game

- Developers: COR Entertainment, LLC
- Engine: CRX Engine (Quake II engine with ODE)
- Platforms: Microsoft Windows, OS X, Linux, FreeBSD
- Release: October 2004
- Genre: First-person shooter
- Modes: Single-player, multiplayer

Alien Arena (initially CodeRED: Alien Arena) is an open-source, stand-alone first-person shooter video game. Begun by COR Entertainment in 2004, the game combines a 1950s-era sci-fi atmosphere with gameplay similar to the Quake, Doom, and Unreal Tournament series. Alien Arena focuses mainly on online multiplayer action, although it does contain single-player matches against bots.

Alien Arena has been released for Microsoft Windows, OS X, Linux, and FreeBSD. While the game's content is proprietary freeware, prohibiting commercial re-sale, the CRX engine is open source. In 2013 the assets license was loosened somewhat, which allowed the game package to be included in certain Linux distributions, such as Fedora, Debian and Ubuntu.

Since July 2023, Alien Arena is available on the Linux App Store Flathub. Since August 2023, Alien Arena is also available for free on the indie games website itch.io.

== Gameplay ==
The game features an internal server browser for finding other players online, and the external Galaxy program performs the same function without having to launch the game, akin to The All-Seeing Eye. It also serves as an IRC client for chat between players. The game uses modified Quake II physics. Most Quake II trickjumps, such as strafejumping, will work in Alien Arena. However, dodging, which is not present in Quake II, has also been added to the game.

== Development ==
Although it had been in development since 2003, Alien Arena was first released as a beta in August 2004, with the title CodeRED: Alien Arena. The first stable version was released in October. Two single-player, campaign-style games, CodeRED: Battle for Earth and CodeRED: Martian Chronicles, were released during 2003. Following these games, Alien Arena received greater development focus. The final upgrade to the two single-player games was made available on February 18, 2005. The "CodeRED" title continued to be used until Alien Arena 2006 was released in November 2005, promoted as a "sequel" to the old CodeRED version.

In September 2012, Alien Arena was also made available as an online version through Roozz. By installing a small plugin, players can play the game in any browser on the Windows operating system.

=== Game engine ===
The game is powered by the Quake II-based CRX game engine, which has been rewritten to include support for such features as 32-bit high-resolution textures, 3D models used as architecture in maps, GLSL per-pixel lighting effects, parallax mapping, normal mapping, ragdoll physics using the Open Dynamics Engine, server-side antilag code, shaders (GLSL and rscript), textured particles, semi-true reflective water with per-pixel distortion shaders, reflective surfaces on entities, light bloom, real-time shadows, overbright bits, real-time vertex lighting, and other graphical effects, all of which can be turned on or off in the menu. As of CRX version 7.30, OpenAL is used for sound on all platforms. Physics support was added in version 7.50 using the Open Dynamics Engine.

== Reception ==
Alien Arena has been compared to Quake III and Unreal Tournament, and is considered one of the best free first-person shooters. GameSpot noted the use of 1960s-style sci-fi imagery and good selection of weapons and maps in 2008. In 2008 APCMag.com named Alien Arena among the Top 5 best (free) open source games. In a 2009 review of Linux Format Alien Arena was rated 8/10. Alien Arena was selected in February 2014 as "HotPick" by Linux Format.

== Alien Arena: Warriors of Mars ==
On November 3, 2017, COR Entertainment released Alien Arena: Warriors of Mars on Steam for Windows and Linux platforms.

== See also ==
- First-person shooter
- List of freeware first-person shooters
- List of open source games
