= UFO: Alien Invasion =

Open-source strategy video game

- Developer: UFO: Alien Invasion Team
- Engine: Quake II engine
- Platforms: Linux, FreeBSD, OpenBSD, Windows, AmigaOS 4, Mac OS X, Android
- Release: Version 2.5; 28 June 2014; 12 years ago
- Genres: Real-time strategy, turn-based tactics
- Modes: Single-player, multiplayer

UFO: Alien Invasion is a strategy video game in which the player fights aliens that are trying to take control of the Earth. The game was heavily influenced by the X-COM series, especially UFO: Enemy Unknown.

It is based on a heavily modified Quake II engine, and runs on Linux, FreeBSD, OpenBSD, Microsoft Windows, AmigaOS 4, and Mac OS X for both PowerPC and Intel Macs. There is also a version for Android, published on Android Market.

== Gameplay ==
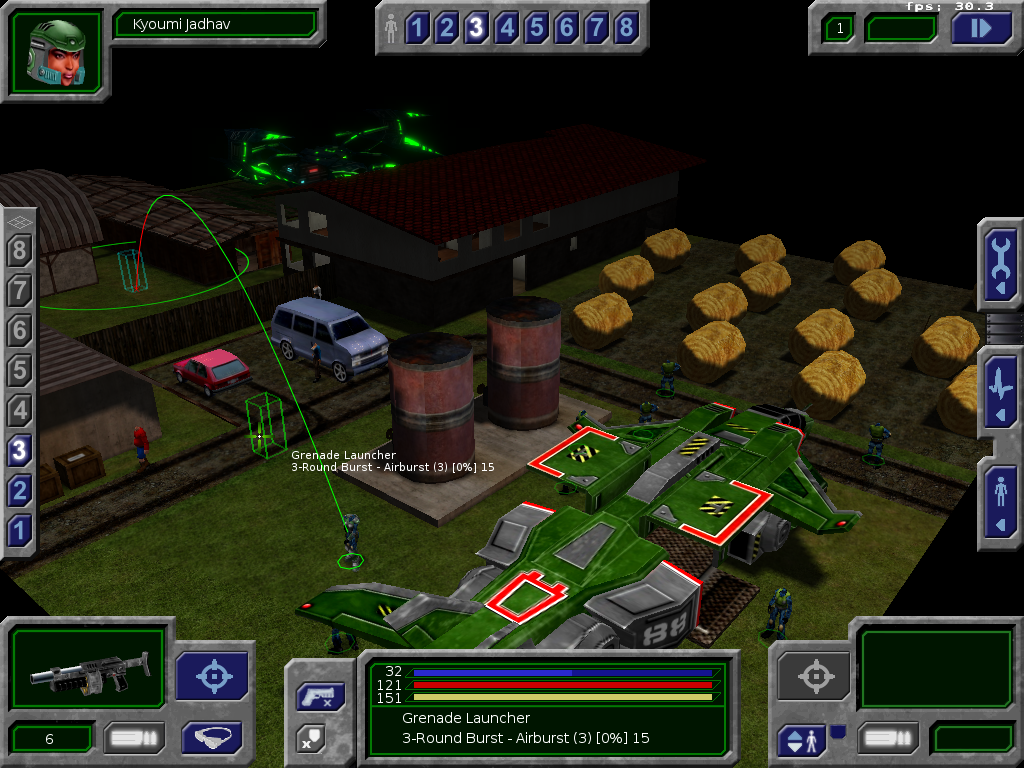
Tactical mode screenshot

The game takes inspiration from the X-COM series by Mythos Games and MicroProse. However, it is neither a sequel nor a remake of any X-COM or other commercial title: "What we as a team wanted to make is a brand new experience that tries to surpass the quality of games from 1992, rather than simply recreate them with flashier graphics." UFO: Alien Invasion is a squad-based tactical strategy game in the tradition of the X-COM series of games (the player controls a secret organization charged with defending Earth from a brutal alien enemy). The game aims to combine military realism with hard science-fiction and the weirdness of an alien invasion and the turn-based system is supposed to give the player pin-point control of the squad while maintaining a sense of pace and danger.

Like the original X-COM games, UFO:AI has two main modes of play: Geoscape mode and Battlescape mode.

=== Geoscape mode ===
Geoscape mode deals with base management and strategy in pausable realtime.

The player directs the activities and finances of PHALANX, controlling bases, installations, aircraft and squads of armed-response troops. Once researched, new technologies may be used in battle against the aliens. Interceptor aircraft can be launched to shoot down UFOs and dispatch dropships in response to alien activity across the globe. The player can build, buy, produce, and sell anything available, as long as technology level and budget allow it. Geoscape allows the player to accelerate or slow the passage of time, automatically pausing whenever an important event occurs. Research will progress and items will be produced as time passes. The player can build additional facilities (provided they have enough base space) and hire employees (provided they have enough living space) to increase the speed of production, research, or to replace soldiers lost in combat. All items in the game, ranging from weaponry to crashed alien ships take up space and need storage facilities. The player receives money from supporting countries (based on effectiveness at dealing with aliens in their area) monthly, but the majority of the money comes from selling loot like alien weaponry or materials collected from successful tactical missions.

=== Battlescape mode ===
In Battlescape mode, the player takes command of a squad of soldiers in missions to combat the aliens wherever they might appear. The player uses only the squad assigned to deal with this mission (as of 2.5, the maximum number of player-controlled actors is 12, though dropships restrict this away from base defenses to 8).

Battlescape features a turn-based system, where the human team and the aliens take turns to make moves. Civilians and other bystanders may be found during the mission, either being targeted by the aliens, or just getting in the way while the troops try to protect them. During the player's turn troops can be ordered to move around, fire their weapons, throw grenades or use other equipment. Each soldier gets a certain amount of Time Units (TUs), representing the total time they have to act during the current turn. All actions in Battlescape require Time Units to perform and once a soldier is out of Time Units, the soldier cannot do anything more until the next turn. Both aliens and humans can reserve TUs for reaction fire, however, and if the actor sees an enemy perform actions with equal or greater TU cost, during their turn, they will fire. Therefore, soldiers armed with pistols and other weapons with low TU costs are often able to get the first shot on an enemy armed with a heavier and deadlier weapon. Saving the game is not allowed in Battlescape, though the player can retry a mission from a Geoscape savestate.

There are many tiers of weapons, such as explosives, projectiles, lasers, plasma, particle beams, and EM guns, each with their strengths and weaknesses (examples being the high accuracy of lasers, but relatively low damage output, or the high damage of particle beams, but low rates of fire and high recoil). Unlike X-COM and many similar games, there is no one "super weapon" that the player rushes to and then arms every single soldier with as soon as they can but should rather keep a healthy, balanced arsenal to be effective at different ranges and amounts of cover. An unusual feature for a turn-based, tile-based game is that instead of purely-abstract die rolls, attacks are resolved using Quake's physics simulation, with grenades bouncing off geometry, bullets damaging based on line-of-sight from barrel nose to body part, the influence of randomness confined to firing cones of diameter and weighting predetermined by nonrandom circumstances.

== Development ==
Main theme
The main theme of the game, composed by Manuel "Vanethian" Marino

Work on its fork of the Quake II engine was initially shared with Quake2World (now Quetoo). This engine is free software, licensed under the GNU General Public License. Development is coordinated through SourceForge.net, and the first version was released on 30 December 2003.

Since the end of 2012, UFO:AI's artwork is only licensed under various open source/open content licenses (mostly CC BY-SA 3.0 and public domain), which makes the game fully free and open source software and Debian's DFSG compliant, which allows its inclusion into Linux distributions.

As of 2025, version 2.5 is the latest stable build (released June 28, 2014), while unstable versions of 2.6 were released until the nightly buildbot broke in 2020, so later revisions must be manually compiled from source.

== Reception ==
UFO:AI was nominated for "Best project for Gamers" in the SourceForge 2007 and 2008 Community Choice Awards. In 2008 APCMag.com named UFO: Alien Invasion among the Top 5 best (free) open source games. Linux Game News named it the Best Open Source Game in the Turn-Based category in September 2012 and it was positively noted by Linux Journal. Between 2006 and May 2017 UFO:AI was downloaded from Sourceforge over 1.7 million times.
