= Sin (video game) =

1998 video game

- North American cover art
- Developers: Original; Ritual Entertainment; Hyperion Entertainment (Linux); Reloaded; Nightdive Studios
- Publishers: Original; Activision; Reloaded; Atari
- Director: Joseph Selinske
- Producers: Harry A. Miller IV; Sean Dunn; John Tam
- Designers: Richard Gray; Matthias Worch
- Programmers: Scott Alden; Mark Dochtermann; Jim Dosé
- Artist: Michael Hadwin
- Writer: Marc Saltzman
- Composer: Zak Belica
- Engine: Original; Quake II engine Reloaded; KEX Engine
- Platforms: Windows; Linux; Classic Mac OS; Reloaded; Playstation 5; Xbox Series X/S; Nintendo Switch; Nintendo Switch 2
- Release: Windows; NA: November 5, 1998; EU: 1998; Linux; EU: November 2000; Classic Mac OS; NA: December 12, 2000
- Genre: First-person shooter
- Modes: Single-player, multiplayer

Sin is a 1998 first-person shooter video game developed by Ritual Entertainment and published by Activision. It uses a modified version of the Quake II engine. Sin is set in the dystopian future of 2037, where John Blade, a commander in a security force named HardCorps in the megacity of Freeport, is tasked to rid the city of a recreational drug that may be tied to the rival biotechnology megacorporation, SinTek.

Sin was released to generally positive reviews, with praise going towards its level design and premise, but criticism for technical issues that resulted from a rushed release. It sold poorly as a result of competition with Half-Life.

Nightdive Studios acquired the rights to Sin in 2020, and in March 18, 2020 republished the game, along with the Wages of Sin expansion pack, as Sin: Gold. In September 2020, the studio announced plans to release a remastered version, titled Sin: Reloaded, originally for a 2021 release but later scheduled for and released on September 24, 2026.

== Gameplay ==
Sin introduced some new features to the first-person shooter genre, such as the ability to knock the weapon out of an opponent's hand and to take area-specific damage from enemies. Although driveable vehicles did not play a big part in the game, there are some sections and levels which require the player to drive certain vehicles, including an all-terrain vehicle, a patrol boat, a forklift, and a helicopter. There are three different types of body armor – for the legs, for the torso and for the head, with each of them depleting separately according to where the player is hit.

Computer terminals can be manipulated through a command prompt. Many levels have multiple ways in which to complete them, and actions can trigger changes in future levels. Some of these actions can force the player to go through an entirely different set of levels.

The enemies can run for cover, call for reinforcements, locate the player, and respond to specific scripts.

== Plot ==
=== Setting ===
In the near future of 2037, the police force collapsed due to corruption and ineffectiveness against the rising tide of crime. Private security companies have taken the police's place, with some of them patrolling the streets like the former police, some in charge of protecting their employer's assets. The protagonist of the game, Colonel John R. ("Rusty") Blade, is the commander of one of the largest security forces in the city of Freeport, HardCorps. Prior to the beginning of the game, Blade is working to rid the streets of a potent new recreational drug named U4, which is rapidly gaining popularity in Freeport and is rumored to be able to cause genetic mutations to its users.

One of the companies that employs its own armed security forces is SinTEK, a large multinational biotechnology corporation specializing in medical and chemical research. The company is owned by Elexis Sinclaire, who took control of SinTEK following the disappearance of her father, Dr. Thrall Sinclaire, the company's founder.

Throughout the missions, Blade is aided via radio link by a computer expert working at HardCorps: JC, a skilled hacker, capable of breaking into even the tightest of networks. In fact, Blade had first found out about JC when investigating a cracker who had broken into the HardCorps system. After tracking down the hacker, Blade, recognizing the perpetrator's talents, decided to make him a job offer at HardCorps instead of arresting him. Thus, JC became one of the HardCorps most valuable assets and the only one able to assist them in hacking-based missions.

=== Story ===
John Blade responds to a full-scale bank heist and hostage situation perpetrated by the well-known Freeport criminal boss Antonio Mancini. The bank robbery was funded by Elexis Sinclaire, who in fact only wanted Mancini to steal a safety deposit box from the bank's vault. When she learns that he launched a full-scale bank heist instead, she injects him with concentrated U4 and turns him into a mutant, sending him after Blade. John manages to defeat the huge creature and afterwards learns that it was, in fact, Mancini himself. Blade also finds out that the substance found in Mancini's body after his death is only manufactured by one company: SinTEK. All these unavoidable facts force Blade to embark on an investigation into SinTEK's vast industrial area located in the outskirts of Freeport.

Later, Blade learns that Elexis Sinclaire's main goal is to contaminate the Freeport water system with vast quantities of U4, turning all of the city's inhabitants into mutants. He manages to thwart that plan, but it turns out to be just a diversion because, in the meantime, SinTEK's troops steal nuclear warheads from a U.S. military base. Elexis threatens to fill them with U4 and launch them at specific targets, turning the entire world's population into mutants. As Blade becomes aware of that, he heads to SinTEK's main base in order to stop Sinclaire. However, once Blade defeats the SinTEK's security and mutants at the base, he reaches Sinclaire, only for her to escape by transferring her entire body into a rocket that launches itself into the sky, splits and spreads everywhere. Sinclaire disappears through the rockets, JC is unable to locate them, and in Blade's fury at the escape, he smashes a button, causing the nuclear missiles to abort their launch.

== Development ==
Development started in 1997, on the Quake engine. When the Quake II engine was completed some months later, the developers switched to that engine.

A skeletal animation system was used for the characters.

The game demo was found to have a CIH virus infection in one of its mirror links. Activision had advised players only to download the game demo from their website. Due to the amount of patches which made the game more CPU-intensive, primary Amiga developer and later AmigaOS developer Hyperion Entertainment had to eventually cancel the AmigaOS version due to the lack of hardware at the time.

According to Robert M. Atkins, who served as the game's "design and marketing lead", Ritual Entertainment's relationship with Activision had deteriorated to the point where the lack of testing allowed the golden master to ship with a game-breaking bug where the first boss of the game was disabled.

Voice actress Hannah Logan, who voiced Elexis, thought she did it well as she could do "a really low" voice and "do sexy vixens pretty well and it comes pretty easily." Logan commented on Elexis and Blade: "Love and hate are different sides of the same coin; I think they are in 'love' with hating each other. Passion, pain, pleasure, winning, it's all the same in their cat and mouse game. ... I think Elexis is very much in touch with her 'feminine' side, but uses it in a masculine way, as a weapon. A bimbo is, ultimately, a victim. Elexis knows exactly what she is doing - she uses her sensuality to win, not that it always works, but it is definitely a major piece of ammo in her arsenal."

== Reception ==
Reception

Aggregate score
Aggregator	Score
GameRankings	72%

Review scores
Publication	Score
AllGame	4.5/5
CNET Gamecenter	7/10
Computer Games Strategy Plus	3/5
Computer Gaming World	2.5/5
Edge	8/10
Game Informer	8.5/10
GamePro	2.5/5
GameRevolution	B−
GameSpot	7.7/10
Hyper	89/100
IGN	7/10
Next Generation	4/5
PC Accelerator	8/10 (TOT) 5/10
PC Gamer (US)	91%
The Cincinnati Enquirer	2/4

Sin received above-average reviews, according to the review aggregation website GameRankings. While PC Zone gave the game a "Classic" award, praising its inventive level design and engaging plot, most other publications did not have such a glowing view towards it. Next Generation said, "while we feel the game may be a little light in the originality department, it certainly shines where it counts – gameplay – and [is] definitely worth your time."

One common complaint was the long load times, which measured in the minutes between each level, death, or quickload. With later patches, the long load times were greatly shortened, although compatibility with old save games was lost, forcing players to play through the game from the beginning or use cheats to progress to their previous point in the game. Another major concern was the abundance of bugs and glitches littered throughout the game. Some of the more widely reported bugs include a total lack of sound in the game, an end of chapter boss which could not move, a level on one path through the game not being finishable and general game crashes. Although these bugs were quickly patched up, the damage of the negative publicity had already been done, especially with the majority of the press reviewing the unpatched version. The patch was exceptionally large; at the time it was normal to expect a game patch file to be up to 5 MB in size, whereas Sin's first patch was over 31 MB. This was at a time when a substantial fraction of internet access was via dial-up, causing Activision to take the unusual step of offering to send CDs containing the patch to any owners of the game who did not have sufficient bandwidth to download it from the Internet. A likely explanation for the multitude of bugs is that the game may have been rushed to meet the 1998 Christmas season, possibly as an attempt to beat Half-Life to market.

Mark Asher of CNET Gamecenter wrote, "Sin had a good first month, but then tailed off sharply." Combined with the failure of competitors Shogo: Mobile Armor Division and Blood II: The Chosen, its performance led him to speculate that the first-person shooter genre's market size was smaller than commonly believed, as the "only FPS game that has done really well [over the Christmas 1998 period] is Half-Life". However, BBC News' Alfred Hermida reported that the game had achieved "decent success" over the holiday shopping season, and wrote that he expected a sequel to emerge as a result.

The villain Elexis Sinclaire was received mostly very positively. According to Story-Driven Character Design, the "beautiful, sexy" Elexis Sinclair was in fact the main selling point of the first game. PC Ultra included her among the three best elements of the game "definitely the most innovative opponent seen in the latest first-person shooters." The character has also been often compared to Lara Croft from Tomb Raider, due to both characters being seen as sex symbols in gaming. A 1999 article about female video game characters in Polish magazine Gambler opined that Elexis was a "tremendous" challenger for Lara, as she was "even better built, with even greater bust and with a beauty mark like Cindy Crawford." However, Phaedra Boinodiris from WomenGamers.com, talking to GamesRadar in 2007, used Elexis as an example of game characters "sexualized to the point of deformity" as she looked "like she crawled out of an S&M club."

The game sold 350,000 units worldwide.

== Sequels and other media ==
A mission pack was released for the game in 1999 by 2015, titled Sin Mission Pack: Wages of Sin. The player reprises the role of John Blade, and the story picks up after the conclusion of the main game, pitting the player against Gianni Manero, a notorious crime boss looking to take over Freeport city.

In 2000, ADV Films released a 60-minute anime film Sin: The Movie. Although loosely based on the game, with similar characters and plot elements, there are some differences. For example, one of major characters from the game is killed off in the first few moments of the film; also, it takes place in the 2070s, whereas the games take place in the late 2030s.

A sequel, Sin Episodes: Emergence, was made by Ritual and was intended to be released episodically over Steam network. The only episode, titled "Emergence", was released on May 10, 2006.

An alternate reality game based in the Sin universe was launched in 2005 to promote the announcement of Sin Episodes: Emergence. Various cryptic puzzles could be found on the website, and solving these would lead to new pieces of media and art. However, support for this piece of viral marketing by Ritual Entertainment did not last, although it has been claimed by Ritual that the final puzzles still remained unsolved.

Sin was re-released on the Steam platform on April 5, 2006, bundled together with Sin Episodes: Emergence. This version of Sin (version 1.12) includes fixes for audio and video playback problems, as well as integration with the Steam multiplayer server browser. It was reissued, along with its expansion pack Sin Mission Pack: Wages of Sin, on GOG.com on January 30, 2014, DRM-free and fixed for modern hardware.

Nightdive Studios, a team focused on bringing classic PC games to modern systems, acquired the rights to Sin in January 2020. On March 18, 2020, Nightdive re-released Sin on Steam and GOG as Sin Gold, an updated version of the game provided for free to accounts that already owned Sin. Sin Gold incorporates the Wages of Sin expansion pack, adds support for modern resolutions, restores the original game assets, and fixes many bugs.

Additionally, alongside the Gold edition, Nightdive announced plans for a remastered version of Sin to run on their KEX Engine, scheduled for release in 2021. It was announced during 3D Realms’ Realms Deep digital event that the remastered version would be called Sin: Reloaded and that it would be released in 2021. After an extended delay, Sin: Reloaded was released on September 24, 2026.

At Realms Deep 2022, an announcement for the game Phantom Fury, a sequel to Ion Fury, was shown. Close to the end, John Blade makes an appearance, and HardCorps is mentioned briefly, implying that the two franchises are connected.
