= Sin Episodes: Emergence =

2006 video game

- Boxart of the European retail release, showing Jessica Cannon in the foreground and John Blade in the background.
- Developer: Ritual Entertainment
- Publishers: Ritual Entertainment; Nightdive Studios
- Designer: Shawn Ketcherside
- Programmer: Ken Harward
- Artist: Robert M. Atkins
- Writer: Shawn Ketcherside
- Composer: Zak Belica
- Engine: Source
- Platform: Microsoft Windows
- Release: May 10, 2006
- Genre: First-person shooter
- Modes: Single-player, multiplayer

Sin Episodes: Emergence is a 2006 first-person shooter developed and published by Ritual Entertainment. It is the first game in a planned series of episodic games for Windows that would have expanded upon the 1998 computer game Sin. A total of nine episodes were planned with only the first one released. It is powered by the Source game engine, the first episode "Emergence" was the first computer game by a major developer to both be produced episodically and delivered over the Internet without the intervention of a publisher. This was accomplished through Valve's Steam content delivery system.

In 2007, Ritual was acquired by casual game developer MumboJumbo, stalling the franchise and leaving the future of the series uncertain. With the sale of Ritual to MumboJumbo and departure of several employees, all future development of Sin Episodes appears to be delayed indefinitely, if not entirely canceled. MumboJumbo has already tasked Ritual to develop "high-quality casual content."

== Gameplay ==
Three Mercenaries, two with the Assault Rifle, one with the Scattergun. The closest one, in helmet, is a heavy version

Normal single player story mode features a dynamic difficulty engine called Personal Challenge System, which gradually makes various aspects of the game harder or easier depending on the player's performance statistics. When starting a new game, the player can choose how much the difficulty is allowed to increase and how quickly it is allowed to decrease. Additionally, the player can enable the HardCORPS mode where all game saving is disabled, so that dying or quitting resets all progress.

Arena Mode is a single player mode and was designed to run a contest at E3 2006 as part of a promotion alongside Vigor Gaming. In this high score mode the objective is to survive as long as possible among the steadily spawning and increasing enemies. There are time limits to the maps and it is possible to survive an entire round. The scoring system is also tied to the Personal Challenge System which runs at a much higher rate than in the main game. The challenge level changes every few seconds depending on the player's performance and the higher the challenge, the higher the rate of points that are accumulated. This mode was introduced into the game on June 26, 2006, with four maps available. An update was released on July 18, 2006, which included three further maps.

== Plot ==
Freeport City is a bustling, futuristic megacity with a population of 27,000,000 and described as a mix of New York, San Francisco, and Tokyo. Areas that are featured in Emergence include the Freeport Docks, Sintek Supremacy Tower, and Radek's hidden drugs lab on board a beached, derelict oil tanker.

=== Characters ===
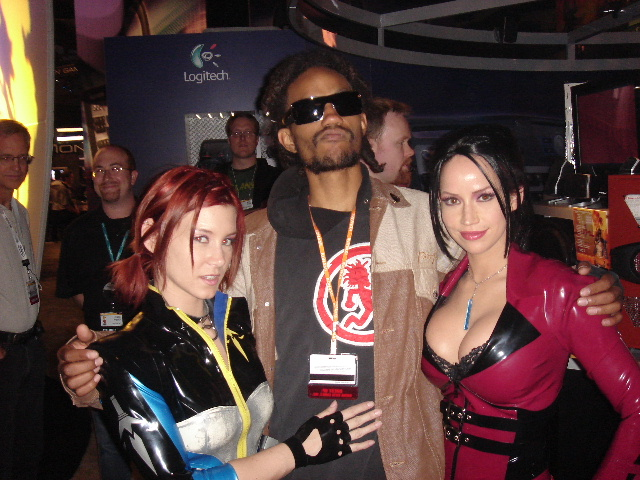
Models Cindy Synnett dressed as Jessica Cannon (left) and Bianca Beauchamp dressed as Elexis Sinclaire (right) at E3 2006

- Colonel John R. Blade (player): Colonel Blade is the leader of HardCORPS and is "obsessed" with bringing Elexis to justice.
- Elexis Sinclaire: Elexis is the CEO of SinTEK Industries and wants to speed up human evolution. To do this, she has made a mutagenic drug called "U4". In 2010, UGO featured her among the 50 best girls in video games ("charming, brilliant, and an absolute fox with nigh-impossible proportions").
- JC Armack: "A HardCorps hacker with a secret to keep" Jessica calls him "Skeeve".
- Jessica Cannon: The newest addition to Blade's core team at HardCORPS, Jessica is able to infiltrate most secure lockups with ease. She is voiced by Halo voice-actress Jen Taylor.
- Viktor Radek: Viktor Radek leads the Cartel, and is suspected of helping Elexis with U4 shipping. He is voiced by actor David Scully.

== Development ==
Ritual's original intention was to release an episode every six months that would cost US$19.95 and take around four to six hours to complete. A total of nine episodes were envisioned. Although originally released as a single-player game, various multiplayer modes were planned including co-operative and team based modes.

One of Ritual's main design goals with Sin Episodes was to offer interactivity, character-driven gameplay, emergent AI, and a plot reflecting the choices made by players through an opt-in statistics system that aggregates play data to a database: the intention that future episodes would thus depend on the choices that are made by each player.

Sin Episodes is built on the Source engine with additional technology added by Ritual.

- Community-driven outcomes: Ritual is considering using the trends of players to decide the plot development of the game in future episodes, a concept only possible with episodic development. If the majority of players make the same decision when faced with a choice, future episodes can be steered towards that outcome. Ritual explains, "if a feature is well-received by gamers, we might expand its role in the game, whereas aspects that aren't liked can be changed or phased out completely." At the same time they said, "we understand that it may be frustrating to not see 'your' outcome become a reality, so we're still determining the extent to which this feature will be implemented."
- Multiple-material surfaces: The Source engine does not natively support multiple materials on a prop—in other words, a model can only be made out of one thing. If an object such as a vehicle includes glass it will behave like the metal covering the body, and if you add armour to a character it will behave like flesh, unless you set the entire character to be metal. Ritual has added technology to alleviate this and have different material types on the same model.
- Dynamic difficulty: Dubbed the Personal Challenge System, Sin Episodes adapts itself to the player's skill level and varies the skill, numbers and toughness of enemies faced in accordance the player's performance to ensure a suitable level of challenge as well as to help pace the player through the game, ensuring an even game length across all skill levels. Indeed, Ritual claims that a proficient FPS player and a brand new FPS player started at the same time and, despite their widely different level of ability, finished within a small range of time of each other. However, a bug present on release in the dynamic difficulty system caused the system to never ease up on players making it overly challenging and unforgiving. An update released through Steam on May 17, 2006, resolved this problem.

== Reception ==
Reception

Aggregate score
Aggregator	Score
Metacritic	75/100

Review scores
Publication	Score
Eurogamer	7/10
GameSpot	7.3/10
GamesRadar+	4/5
IGN	8.0/10
PC Gamer (US)	78/100

Sin Episodes: Emergence received generally favorable reviews and currently holds the score of 75 on Metacritic. As of January 27, 2007, the game had sold 150,000 units, enough to recoup development costs but not enough to fund a sequel.
