= Ritual Entertainment =

Former video game developer

- Formerly: Hipnotic Interactive (1996–1997)
- Type: Subsidiary
- Industry: Video games
- Founded: August 12, 1996
- Founders: Robert Atkins; Mark Dochtermann; Jim Dosé; Richard Gray; Michael Hadwin; Harry Miller; Tom Mustaine
- Defunct: January 24, 2007
- Fate: Acquired by and folded into MumboJumbo, assets later acquired by iplay.com
- Headquarters: Dallas, Texas, U.S.
- Products: SiN series
- Website: ritual.com (archived)

Ritual Entertainment was an American video game developer established in 1996 by Robert Atkins, Mark Dochtermann, Jim Dosé, Richard 'Levelord' Gray, Michael Hadwin, Harry Miller, and Tom Mustaine. Based in Dallas, Texas, Ritual Entertainment was formerly known as Hipnotic Interactive, during which period it began development of its signature video game SiN.

== History ==
Members of the Ritual Entertainment development team have contributed assets to other games such as American McGee's Alice, Medal of Honor: Airborne, Tomb Raider: Legend, and 25 to Life, and are also the creators of "Übertools" for id Tech 3, which has been licensed for a number of other games.

Shortly after signing Hipnotic, publisher Activision claimed that Hipnotic had been at the core of the Duke Nukem 3D development team. Duke Nukem 3D developer 3D Realms vigorously denied this, stating that only five members of Hipnotic Interactive were former staff of 3D Realms, and of these five only three had a significant role in making Duke Nukem 3D.

In late 1997, Hipnotic changed its name to Ritual Entertainment in order to avoid a trademark conflict with another video-game developer, Hypnotix.

On January 24, 2007, developer MumboJumbo announced the acquisition of Ritual Entertainment. With this acquisition, Ritual's focus on traditional action-oriented games was changed to casual games, essentially "stalling" Ritual's latest game series, Sin Episodes: Emergence, after releasing only one episode out of a planned nine.

The purchase followed months of departures of several key employees, including chief executive officer Steve Nix, who became director of business development at id Software, vice president and co-founder Tom Mustaine, who left to found Escalation Studios. Several months after the acquisition, community relations manager Steve Hessel left the company to join Splash Damage.

Prior to the announcement, on December 6, 2006, Ritual announced the appointment of Ken Harward as the company's new studio director.

Following the company's closure, many of the developers have left to other companies such as id Software, Gearbox Software, Escalation Studios, and the now-defunct Nerve Software and Paradigm Entertainment.

== Games developed ==
Year	Title	Platform(s)						Notes
Year	Title	Windows	Linux	macOS	PS2	Xbox	Dreamcast	
1997	Quake Mission Pack No. 1: Scourge of Armagon	Yes	Yes	Yes	No	No	Commercial homebrew released in Russia only	Expansion pack
1998	SiN	Yes	Yes	Yes	No	No	No	Linux version ported by Hyperion Entertainment
2000	Heavy Metal: F.A.K.K. 2	Yes	Yes	Yes	No	No	No	Linux version ported by Loki Software, Mac OS Classic version ported by Contraband Entertainment, Mac OS X version ported by The Omni Group
2000	Blair Witch Volume III: The Elly Kedward Tale	Yes	No	No	No	No	No	—N/a
2003	Star Trek: Elite Force II	Yes	No	Yes	No	No	No	—N/a
2003	Legacy of Kain: Defiance	Yes	No	No	Yes	Yes	No	External collaboration with Crystal Dynamics
2004	Counter-Strike: Condition Zero	Yes	Yes	Yes	No	Yes	No	Ritual Entertainment worked on the game in 2002 after development was transferred from Gearbox Software and before continued development was transferred to Turtle Rock Studios in mid-2003. Ritual's contribution included Deleted Scenes and the port to Xbox.
2004	Delta Force: Black Hawk Down: Team Sabre	Yes	No	No	No	No	No	Expansion pack
2006	Sin Episodes: Emergence	Yes	No	No	No	No	No	Only one episode, "Emergence", was released
2006	25 to Life	Yes	No	No	Yes	Yes	No	External collaboration with Avalanche Software, cinematics

=== Unreleased ===
- The Lord of the Rings: The Two Towers (PC) – canceled
- SiN II publisher demo (2003, PC) – Ritual Entertainment made a game demo to show potential publishers.
- Legacy of Kain: The Dark Prophecy (2004) – canceled
- SiN Episode 2 – canceled
- Quake 4: Awakening – unreleased expansion pack for Quake 4
