= List of cancelled PlayStation 3 games =

The PlayStation 3 is a video game console released by Sony in 2006. The follow-up to their extremely successful PlayStation 2, the console initially struggled due to its high price point and the difficulty of developing for its unique system architecture. These factors, combined with increased budget and scope involved with the move into high-definition video game development, led to the cancellation of games. This list documents games that were confirmed for the PlayStation 3 at some point, but did not end up being released for it in any capacity.

== Games ==
There are currently 134 games on this list. (Note: This number is always up to date by this script.)

List of cancelled PlayStation 3 games
Title(s)	Notes/Reasons	Developer	Publisher
2 Days to Vegas	A game in which the player character traveled between multiple American cities to reach Las Vegas began development in 2003 and was announced in 2005, planned to release first on Xbox 360 and PC before coming to PlayStation 3 later. Though no new media of the game was shown after 2008, developer Steel Monkeys continued to assert it was in development, though the remainder of the console generation passed without the game being released.	Steel Monkeys	
Aero-Cross	As part of Namco Generations, a line of modern remakes of classic Namco arcade games, a revival of the arcade game Metro-Cross (1985) was announced in 2010 for release on PlayStation 3 and Xbox 360. However, Namco remained silent for some time regarding the game's progress until 2012, when it was announced that Aero-Cross had been cancelled and there would be no further Namco Generations games.	Namco Bandai Games	Namco Bandai Games
Afterfall: Insanity	A port of the game was planned for PlayStation 3 and Xbox 360, but never released.	Intoxicate Studios	Nicolas Entertainment Group
The Agency: Covert Ops	Initially announced in 2007, the MMO shooting game The Agency: Covert Ops was cancelled following the closure of its developer, SOE Seattle.	SOE Seattle	Sony Online Entertainment
Agent	Initially teased in 2007 and announced in 2009, the stealth action game Agent was a source of much speculation, with Rockstar Games not providing any details beyond its title. Development extended beyond the lifespan of the PlayStation 3, and the trademark was eventually fully abandoned in 2018. According to former Rockstar employees, the game was cancelled as a result of members of the development team being reassigned to work on Grand Theft Auto V.	Rockstar North	Rockstar Games
Animal Wars	Prior to the launch of the PlayStation 3, Julian Eggebrecht of Factor 5 made a pitch to Sony for Animal Wars, a World War I-inspired tactics game featuring anthropomorphic animal characters as combatants. Sony approved the pitch, and it began development under a small team while the bulk of the company focused on the game that would become Lair (2007). In 2006, due to Lair's troubled development and Sony's marketing team becoming uncomfortable with the concept of animals shooting each other in a dark and violent setting, Animal Wars was cancelled and its team was laid off.	Factor 5	Sony Computer Entertainment
Ashes Cricket 2013	Originally released on PC to scathing reviews, the game was shortly after pulled from Steam, and planned console versions for PlayStation 3, Xbox 360, and Wii U were cancelled.	Trickstar Games	505 Games
The Avengers	A first-person brawler video game set to be released in 2012 to coincide with the release of the 2012 film of the same name was announced for many platforms, PlayStation 3 included. However, THQ's financial difficulties at the time led to multiple games being delayed or cancelled, and with this project being tied to the timing of the film's release, it was ultimately scrapped and not released on any platforms.	Blue Tongue Entertainment	THQ
Batman: The Dark Knight	Beginning development prior to principal photography for the film The Dark Knight, developer Pandemic Studios experienced several technical difficulties resulting from the games' assets being incompatible with its chosen game engine. As a result, the game missed the film's release window, and the ongoing technical issues resulted in the decision to cancel production, with Electronic Arts losing the Batman license and Pandemic being shut down shortly thereafter.	Pandemic Studios	Electronic Arts
Beautiful Katamari	While initially reported as coming to both PlayStation 3 and Xbox 360, only the Xbox 360 version released in 2007, making it the first Katamari game to not be released on a PlayStation system.	Namco Bandai Games	Namco Bandai Games
Beyond Good and Evil 2	Announced in 2008 as a sequel to the original Beyond Good and Evil (2003) in development for the Xbox 360 and PlayStation 3 platforms. As of 2026, the game is still in-development and unreleased on any platform, though the developers announced that development had moved on to more powerful hardware, as both of its original platforms were deemed too under-powered for their ambitious plans for the game.	Ubisoft Montpellier	Ubisoft
Blue Steel (Superman)	A Superman game in development for the Wii, PlayStation 3, and Xbox 360 platforms in 2008. Initially intended as a tie-in to a proposed Superman Returns film sequel, the game had a troubled development period and had to be retooled when said film sequel was cancelled. In 2009, both Brash Entertainment and Factor 5 were impacted by the Great Recession and closed down, ending the game's development.	Factor 5	Brash Entertainment
Bomberman Live: Battlefest	Versions for PlayStation 3, Xbox 360, and Wii were announced, but only the Xbox 360 version was released.	Hudson Soft	Hudson Soft
Bonk: Brink of Extinction	A downloadable revival of the Bonk series was planned for release on PlayStation 3, Xbox 360, and Wii, but was cancelled in 2011 when Hudson Soft was closed down.	Pi Studios	Hudson Soft
Brothers in Arms: Furious 4	A new entry in the Brothers in Arms series was announced at E3 2011, and would have been an over-the-top take on World War II shooting games with four player cooperative play. Developer Gearbox Software later decided that the game would not be a good fit for the Brothers in Arms series, converting the project into an original IP. Furious 4 was ultimately cancelled, though elements of the gameplay would later be utilized in Battleborn (2016).	Gearbox Software	Ubisoft
Capsized	A PlayStation 3 port was intended to be released after the Xbox 360 version in 2013, but failed to materialize.	Alientrap	
Untitled Castlevania game	A 3D entry in the Castlevania franchise was initially announced at Tokyo Game Show in 2008 for the PlayStation 3 and Xbox 360, which was implied to feature Alucard as its main protagonist. However, the game was never released.	Konami	Konami
Cipher Complex	First announced in 2006 as Edge of Reality's first attempt to create their own IP after many years of creating licensed games or ports for other companies. The game was described as a new sort of stealth-based game for the PlayStation 3 and Xbox 360, but the game never materialized and Edge of Reality eventually went out of business.	Edge of Reality	Sega
The City of Metronome	The 3D puzzle platformer The City of Metronome was announced at E3 2005 for then-next generation consoles. The game struggled to find a publisher, and was ultimately placed on indefinite hold in 2007.	Tarsier Studios	
The Chronicles of Narnia: The Voyage of the Dawn Treader	A video game adaptation of The Chronicles of Narnia: The Voyage of the Dawn Treader was in development, but never released.	Nihilistic Software	
Coded Arms: Assault	A PlayStation 3 sequel to Coded Arms (2005) was announced at E3 2006. Konami later announced that they no longer had plans to release the game in any form; a sequel would not be released until Coded Arms: Contagion (2007) for PlayStation Portable.	Konami	Konami
Crash Landed	A reboot of the Crash Bandicoot series, developed by Radical Entertainment, and published by Activision for the PlayStation 3, Xbox 360, Wii, and Nintendo DS. After two years of development, Activision ceased development by laying off the development team in charge of the project at Radical Entertainment.	Radical Entertainment	Activision
Dancing Eyes	As part of Namco Generations, a line of modern remakes of classic Namco arcade games, a revival of the arcade game Dancing Eyes (1996) was announced in 2011 for release on PlayStation 3. However, Namco remained silent for some time regarding the game's progress until 2012, when it was announced that Dancing Eyes had been cancelled.	Namco Bandai Games	Namco Bandai Games
The Dark Eye: Demonicon	Versions for the PlayStation 3 and Xbox 360 were announced, planned for release after the PC version, but these console ports failed to materialize.	Noumena Studios	Kalypso Media
Devil's Third	Initially beginning as an Xbox 360 exclusive to be published by Microsoft Game Studios, the partnership fell through and THQ picked up the game, planning to release it on Xbox 360, PlayStation 3, and PC. These plans were dropped as a result of THQ's bankruptcy, and the game would eventually be published by Nintendo in 2016 as a Wii U exclusive.	Valhalla Game Studios	THQ
Dirty Harry	A video game continuing the story of the 1971 film Dirty Harry was announced in 2005, and was set to feature Clint Eastwood reprising his role as Harry Callahan. While planned to launch on PlayStation 3 and Xbox 360 in 2007, the project was cancelled that year due to development issues.	The Collective	Warner Bros. Interactive
Disaster Report 4	The fourth entry in the Disaster Report series was originally to be developed and published by Irem and released in March 2011, but was delayed before being cancelled as a result of the 2011 Tōhoku earthquake and tsunami. Members of the development team later formed a new company, Granzella, who acquired the rights to Disaster Report in 2014 and resumed development of the game, releasing it for PlayStation 4 in 2018.	Irem	Irem
Dreamcast Collection	A retail listing for PlayStation 3 and Xbox 360 versions of the Dreamcast Collection was first discovered in late 2010. The compilation was only released for Xbox 360, though the individual games were already available for separate digital purchase on PlayStation 3.	Sega	Sega
Dying Light	The game was initially announced in 2013 for PlayStation 3, PlayStation 4, Xbox 360, Xbox One, and PC. The PS3 and 360 versions were later cancelled due to Techland determining that they were not powerful enough to run the game.	Techland	Warner Bros. Interactive Entertainment
Earth No More	Earth No More was a first person shooter set in England, with the player characters dealing with an environmental apocalypse. Initially announced in 2008, the game was never released due to financial difficulties at 3D Realms.	Recoil Games	3D Realms
Eight Days	The action game Eight Days was to feature dual protagonists traveling across eight states over the course of eight days, with the system's real-time clock affecting gameplay. In 2008, it was reported that the game was being put on hold, alongside The Getaway 3, to focus on other first party PlayStation games. While Sony claimed in 2009 that Eight Days and The Getaway 3 were not cancelled, neither game ever saw release.	London Studio	Sony Computer Entertainment Europe
Elveon	The high fantasy RPG Elveon was announced in 2005, but its developer suffered financial problems and was forced to shut down in 2008. Though Elveon was said to be transferred to another developer, it was never completed.	10tacle Studios	
Endless Saga	The MMORPG Endless Saga was announced in 2005 for PlayStation 3 and PC, only to be cancelled in favor of Webzen focusing on other titles in development.	Webzen	Webzen
Epic Mickey	Development for the game was originally started as a PlayStation 3, Xbox 360, and PC release. The rise of the popularity of Nintendo's Wii platform lead to Disney reps asking if a Wii version could be developed too. When developers expressed concern with getting a Wii version up and running as well due to its very different hardware, after further review, they felt a Wii release was most important, and cancelled all other versions before releasing the game on the Wii in 2010.	Junction Point Studios	Disney Interactive Studios
Eternal Light	The cooperative action game Eternal Light, originally announced in 2007 under the codename "Project Witches", was planned for release in 2011, but never released due to developer Revistronic's bankruptcy in 2011.	Revistronic	
Eyedentify	A game that used the PlayStation Eye to interface with a team of operatives was demonstrated at E3 2005, but was not subsequently mentioned again.	London Studio	Sony Computer Entertainment
Faith and a .45	In 2008, Deadline Games announced a cooperative shooter starring a Bonnie and Clyde style pair of outlaws during the Great Depression. While the game received positive press, Deadline were to unable to find a publisher, and the company filed for bankruptcy in 2009.	Deadline Games	
Fallen Frontier	Fallen frontier was a digital-only game being developed for Xbox 360, PlayStation 3 and PC by Moonshot games, a studio founded by former members of Bungie. While the game was positively received by players at trade shows, the company struggled to find a publisher due to changes in the market, and the game was cancelled in 2013.	Moonshot Games	
F.E.A.R. Files	A standalone compilation release of the Perseus Mandate and Extraction Point expansions for F.E.A.R. (2005) was planned for release on Xbox 360 and PlayStation 3 in 2007, though only the Xbox version saw release.	TimeGate Studios	Vivendi Games
Final Fantasy XIV	When Final Fantasy XIV (2010) first launched on Windows, it was heavily criticized by players and press outlets for its poor gameplay and unfinished state. As a result, a planned PlayStation 3 port was delayed while Square worked to fix these issues. Ultimately, this original version never released on PS3, as the decision was made to completely rebuild the game from scratch with a new story and mechanics. When this new game was launched in 2013, initially subtitled as A Realm Reborn, it was released simultaneously on Windows and PS3.	Square Enix	Square Enix
Final Fantasy Versus XIII	Announced in 2006 as part of the Fabula Nova Crystallis Final Fantasy series, Final Fantasy Versus XIII was planned as a PlayStation 3 exclusive. As a result of slow development and gradual expansion of the game's scope, plans for the PS3 version were abandoned due to the system approaching the end of its life cycle, and development shifted to the next generation of consoles, ultimately releasing on PlayStation 4 and Xbox One as Final Fantasy XV (2016).	Square Enix	Square Enix
Fortress	Fortress was the codename for a planned spinoff in the Final Fantasy series, intended as a sequel to the events of Final Fantasy XII (2006). While production began in 2009, Square Enix expressed dissatisfaction with the game's art style and withheld milestone payments to developer Grin throughout development. As a result of this, combined with lower-than-expected sales from the company's other games released that year, Grin suffered heavy financial losses and the company was forced to shut down six months into the development of Fortress.	Grin	Square Enix
Frame City Killer	Frame City Killer was an action game in which players controlled an assassin in a near future setting attempting to take down a drug kingpin. While originally intended to release early in 2006, the game's release date slipped to later in the year before disappearing altogether.	Namco Bandai Games	Namco Bandai Games
Frontlines: Fuel of War	Originally intended to release alongside the Xbox 360 and Windows versions in 2008, the PlayStation 3 version was cancelled due to development difficulties.	Kaos Studios	THQ
A Game of Dwarves	The game was originally planned for release in 2012 on PlayStation 3 and PC, but only the PC version was released.	Zeal Game Studio	Paradox Interactive
The Getaway 3	A new entry in Sony's The Getaway series was announced in 2005. In 2008, it was reported that the game was being put on hold, alongside Eight Days, to focus on other first party PlayStation games. While Sony claimed in 2009 that Eight Days and The Getaway 3 were not cancelled, neither game ever saw release.	Team Soho / London Studio	Sony Computer Entertainment
GlowTag	GlowTag was intended as a video-free party game using the PlayStation Move controller, in which players would attempt to tag one another by touching each other's controllers. While announced in 2013 as a downloadable game for PlayStation 3, PlayStation 4, PC and Mac, the game was never released.	Greenfly Studios	
Gotham by Gaslight	A video game adaptation of Gotham by Gaslight, an alternate universe Batman story set in the 1800s, began development at Day 1 Studios, but was cancelled after publisher THQ failed to acquire the license to use the Batman IP. Early concept art and video footage later surfaced in 2012.	Day 1 Studios	THQ
Gravité	Production of the gravity-based action game began in 2008, and utilized the PlayStation 3 Sixaxis controller. In 2009, after seeing an early version of the PlayStation Vita and being impressed with its gyroscope technology, director Keiichiro Toyama decided to cancel the PS3 version and shift development to the Vita, where the game released as Gravity Rush (2012).	Japan Studio	Sony Computer Entertainment
Guillermo del Toro's Sundown	Announced in E3 2006, Sundown was a post-apocalyptic zombie game similar to Left 4 Dead, developed in collaboration with filmmaker Guillermo del Toro. However, del Toro departed the project later that year, and the game was never released.	Terminal Reality	Ubisoft
Guns Up!	Originally announced for the Vita, PlayStation 3, and PlayStation 4, the Vita and PS3 versions were cancelled to help the team focus on being able to release the PS4 version. Difficulty in getting it to run on the Vita's weaker hardware was also cited as a reason for its cancellation.	Valkyrie Entertainment	Sony Interactive Entertainment
Harker	A video game based on Bram Stoker's Dracula. Announced in 2007, the game was placed on hiatus, and later cancelled, so the team could focus on developing Silent Hill: Homecoming (2008) instead.	Double Helix Games	Konami
Heat	A video game sequel to the 1995 film Heat was announced in 2006. While some pre-production work was done, and the company entered into negotiations for the film's cast to reprise their roles, the game never entered full production, as Gearbox Software was already busy with Borderlands and Aliens: Colonial Marines and could not fully commit to a new project.	Gearbox Software	Titan Productions
Heavenly Sword 2	Following the release of Heavenly Sword (2007), original developer Ninja Theory chose not to work on a sequel in favor of developing a new game, Enslaved: Odyssey to the West. SCE Studio Cambridge began work on the game in their place, but the project was ultimately cancelled due to Sony no longer seeing it as commercially viable. Concept art of the game later surfaced in 2012.	SCE Studio Cambridge	Sony Computer Entertainment
Hei$t	An open world video game about a group of criminals performing elaborate thefts was announced in 2007 for PlayStation 3, Xbox 360, and PC. However, technical issues with the PS3 version combined with a strained relationship between its developer and publisher ultimately led to the game's cancellation.	inXile Entertainment	Codemasters
Highlander: The Game	A video game based on the Highlander franchise was announced in 2008. However, the game was officially cancelled in 2010.	WideScreen Games	Eidos Interactive
Hour of Victory	A PlayStation 3 port was scheduled to be released alongside the Xbox 360 version, but failed to materialize.	N-Fusion Interactive	Midway Games
Indiana Jones and the Staff of Kings	A video game in the Indiana Jones franchise was in development for the PlayStation 3 between 2004 and 2009. The plan had been to create a high budget version of the game for the PlayStation 3, Xbox 360, and PC platforms as a collaboration between LucasArts and Bethesda Softworks, and outsource different low-budget versions for weaker platforms such as the Wii and PlayStation 2 to smaller developers. Development issues lead to many delays and a full reboot of the project, and the lack of progress, combined with the company's fear of being unable to compete with the critically acclaimed Uncharted: Drake's Fortune (2007), lead to the eventual cancellation of the high-end versions of the game, while the low-end budget releases ended up being the only ones to release.	Bethesda Softworks	LucasArts
inSANE	The survival horror game inSANE was announced in 2010, to be developed in collaboration with film director Guillermo del Toro, planned for release in 2010. In 2012, shortly before going out of business, THQ announced the cancellation of inSANE, with the game's IP rights transferring to del Toro.	Volition / THQ	THQ
Interstellar Marines	Initially announced to be coming to PlayStation 3, Xbox 360, and PC, only the PC version was released in 2013.	Zero Point Software	Zero Point Software
Killing Day	A first-person shooter announced by Ubisoft as a showcase of what was possible with the then-new PlayStation 3 and Xbox 360 hardware. First announced and shown in video form at E3 2005, Ubisoft went quiet on the project shortly afterwards, and it never materialized in any capacity. The game was cancelled midway through development, though patent renewals for the name still occurred well after the fact in 2009 and 2013.	Ubisoft	Ubisoft
Kingdom Under Fire II	Initially announced for Xbox 360 in 2009, followed by the announcement of a PlayStation 3 version the following year, the game underwent a long and protracted development period that lasted beyond the lifespan of both systems, ultimately releasing only on Windows in 2019.	Blueside, Phantagram	Gameforge
Kurayami	The thriller game Kurayami was planned for release on PlayStation 3, and underwent several revisions during development. After Electronic Arts agreed to publish the game, despite it being nearly completed, they requested that the game's story and mechanics be completely overhauled. As a result, the game was cancelled and the work done was repurposed to become Shadows of the Damned (2011). Earlier drafts of Kurayami's story and concepts were later used as the basis for the game Black Knight Sword (2012) and the manga Kurayami Dance.	Grasshopper Manufacture	Electronic Arts
The Last Guardian	Director Fumito Ueda began concepting ideas for The Last Guardian shortly after the release of the developer's previous game, Shadow of the Colossus (2005), though full production did not begin until 2007. While originally planned to have a shorter development time, the small Team Ico had difficulty achieving acceptable performance on PlayStation 3 hardware. In 2012, Sony made the decision to shift development to the upcoming PlayStation 4, while Ueda and multiple other members of the team left Sony, forcing other studios to finish development of the game. After multiple delays, it was finally released in 2016.	Team Ico	Sony Computer Entertainment
The Last Remnant	Originally slated for release on Xbox 360, PlayStation 3, and PC, the 360 and PC versions released first with no date given for the PS3 version's release. Square Enix later stated that the release was unlikely, believing the PS3 version would not be profitable due to its long delay and the weaker sales of the other versions.	Square Enix	Square Enix
Legacy of Kain: Dead Sun	A sixth entry in the Legacy of Kain series began development for PlayStation 3 and Xbox 360, but was cancelled in 2013 during the early phases of production. Work done on the game's multiplayer mode was later repurposed and converted into a free-to-play multiplayer game, Nosgoth, which entered an open beta phase in 2015 before being shut down in 2016. The existence of Dead Sun was later revealed through footage that leaked in 2015.	Climax Studios	Square Enix
LittleBigPlanet Hub	A smaller free-to-play entry in the LittleBigPlanet series was announced in 2013, intended to feature a limited suite of creation tools and the ability to play a small selection of levels. Following its announcement, no other mention of the game was made, though beta footage was leaked onto the internet in 2024.	Media Molecule	Sony Computer Entertainment
The Lord of the Rings: The White Council	Announced in 2006 for the PlayStation 3 and Xbox 360 as Electronic Arts' answer to Skyrim utilizing the AI from The Sims's games. However, it was cancelled in the following year, with EA reportedly unhappy with initial progress with the game. EA partnered with Pandemic Studios to create The Lord of the Rings: Conquest (2009) instead.	EA Redwood Shores	Electronic Arts
Lords of the Fallen	Initially announced to be released in 2013 for PlayStation 3 Xbox 360, and PC, the game was heavily overhauled and it was decided to move to more powerful hardware, with the console versions releasing on PlayStation 4 and Xbox One in 2014.	Deck13 Interactive, CI Games	CI Games
Mad Max	A video game adaptation of the Mad Max franchise was announced at E3 2013, and was set to release the following year on PlayStation 3, PlayStation 4, PC, Xbox 360, and Xbox One. Following a delay, it was announced in May 2015 that the ports for the two older systems had been cancelled due to hardware limitations; the other versions would be released later that year.	Avalanche Studios	Warner Bros. Interactive Entertainment
Magical Drop V	Ports of Magical Drop V (2012) were announced for Xbox 360 and PlayStation 3, but never released.	Golgoth Studio	UTV Ignition Entertainment
Makai Wars	Initially teased in Makai Kingdom: Chronicles of the Sacred Tome, Makai Wars was announced in 2004 to be releasing on the PlayStation Portable, with a PlayStation 3 version announced the following year. Following the announcement, Nippon Ichi Software did not comment further on the game's development, and it spent over a decade being treated as vaporware. The game ultimately released as a free-to-play mobile title in 2018.	Nippon Ichi Software	Nippon Ichi Software
Marvel Chaos	An intended follow-up to Marvel Nemesis: Rise of the Imperfects (2005) was in development by EA Chicago for the Xbox 360 and PlayStation 3. The studio was dissolved in November 2007, and the game and series were canceled in January 2008 when Electronic Arts changed its portfolio strategy and terminated its partnership with Marvel.	EA Chicago	Electronic Arts
Mega Man Universe	A 2.5D entry in the Mega Man series was announced in 2010 for digital release on PlayStation 3 and Xbox 360, functioning as both a remake of Mega Man 2 (1988) and a creation suite that would allow players to customize their own characters and levels. Following the departure of Mega Man series producer Keiji Inafune later that year, news on the game went silent until March 2011, when it was officially cancelled. In a subsequent interview, Capcom's Christian Svensson explained that while Universe was "pretty far in production", the quality of the game did not meet the company's standards, leading to the decision to cancel the game.	Capcom	Capcom
Metro 2033	The game was initially announced as coming to PlayStation 3 and PC under the name Metro 2033: The Last Refuge. Following THQ becoming the publisher for the game, the decision was made to cancel the PS3 version in favor of an Xbox 360 port.	4A Games	THQ
MilitAnt	Originally announced for PlayStation 4, PlayStation 3, PlayStation Vita and PC, only the PS4 and PC versions were released.	Xibalba Studios	Xibalba Studios
Monster Hunter Tri	Initially announced as a PlayStation 3 exclusive, development later shifted to the Wii due to the high development costs for HD consoles.	Capcom	Capcom
Mortal Kombat X	Initially announced alongside versions for Xbox One, PlayStation 4, and PC, the PlayStation 3 and Xbox 360 versions were delayed past the other versions' release due to development difficulties. Eventually, it was announced that the two versions had been cancelled due to NetherRealm's inability to get the game running at acceptable quality on the older consoles.	NetherRealm Studios	Warner Bros. Interactive Entertainment
Mr. T: The Videogame	In 2009, ZootFly announced that they were planning to release a series of video games based on the Mr. T graphic novels, the first of which would be an action adventure game featuring Mr. T and Will Wright battling Nazis. However, no Mr. T games from ZootFly ever materialized.	ZootFly	
NBA Elite 11	Following several releases in the NBA Live series, EA Sports attempted to rebrand the series as NBA Elite, with the title being announced for the Xbox 360, PlayStation 3, and iOS. However, it suffered heavy development troubles, and after delaying the release, the decision was made to cancel it entirely a week before its intended street date, with subsequent games returning to the NBA Live name. Despite the cancellation, some PlayStation 3 copies had already been shipped to stores and have since become rare collector's items. Only the iOS mobile version of the game ever officially released.	EA Canada	EA Sports
NBA Live 07	Originally announced as a PlayStation 3 launch title, the PS3 version was cancelled in favor of focusing on development of NBA Street Homecourt (2007).	EA Canada	EA Sports
NBA Live 13	Following the cancellation of NBA Elite 11, EA spent two years preparing to relaunch the NBA Live series, announcing NBA Live 13 at E3 2012. Months later, EA announced the game had been cancelled, feeling that the game's quality was not sufficient and deciding to focus on NBA Live 14 as the return for the series instead.	EA Tiburon	EA Sports
Nexuiz	Released for Xbox 360 and PC in 2012, with a PlayStation 3 port scheduled for release later that year, the PS3 version was never released, presumably due to THQ's financial difficulties and impending closure.	IllFonic	THQ
Nioh	Originally announced as a PlayStation 3 exclusive in 2005 and intended for release the following year, the game underwent a very slow development period that extended past the end of the system's life, ultimately releasing on PlayStation 4 in 2017.	Team Ninja	Koei Tecmo
Oil Rush	Originally released on PC and mobile platforms, the game was also intended to later release as a downloadable PS3 title, but this version never materialized.	UNIGINE Holding S.à r.l.	UNIGINE Holding S.à r.l.
Omikron: Karma	A sequel to The Nomad Soul (1999) was planned for release on PlayStation 3, Xbox 360, and PC, but was cancelled in favor of focusing on Heavy Rain (2010).	Quantic Dream	
The Outsider	First announced in 2005 as a showpiece of what was possible with the then-upcoming PlayStation 3 and Xbox 360 hardware, the game experienced a protracted 5–6 years of development time, followed by years of limbo status, before it was declared "stopped" and "probably gone for good" by a head developer in 2014. The game centered around a CIA Agent who was wrongly accused of a crime, and his efforts as a fugitive to clear his name. While no official reason was given for its cancellation, reports indicated that the developers may have struggled with the game's open ended nature, as the game was to present the player with many ways paths and endings through the game. They struggled to find a publisher for the game as well.	Frontier Developments	
Pirates of the Caribbean: Armada of the Damned	An action RPG set in the world of the Pirates of the Caribbean films was announced in 2009 for Xbox 360, PlayStation 3, and PC. Despite positive pre-release reception, developer Propaganda games experienced a restructuring that saw the game's development team laid off in 2010.	Propaganda Games	Disney Interactive Studios
Possession	Possession was a real-time strategy game in which players controlled a zombie who amassed an army of other zombies to take down the corporation responsible for his transformation. The game was put on indefinite hold in 2006 due to the developer's inability to secure a publishing deal.	Blitz Games / Volatile Games	
Postal III	Postal III was initially announced for release on Windows and Xbox 360, with a PlayStation 3 version also being seriously considered by the developers. However, the game was only released for Windows in 2011.	Running with Scissors	Akella
Prey 2	A sequel to Prey (2006) was announced shortly after the first game's release, though substantial work would not begun until 2009 when original publisher 3D Realms transferred the rights to the property to Zenimax Media. The game was re-announced by Bethesda Softworks in 2011, though original developer Human Head Studios ceased working on the project later that year for unspecified reasons. Following several years of rumors about the project's status, the game was formally cancelled in 2014. A new Prey game would not be released until the series reboot in 2017.	Human Head Studios	Bethesda Softworks
Project CARS	Originally announced for the PlayStation 3, Xbox 360, Wii U, and Windows, the PS3 and 360 versions were cancelled in favor of PlayStation 4 and Xbox One versions, while the Wii U version was cancelled.	Slightly Mad Studios	Namco Bandai Games
QuickDraw	Quick Draw was intended as a video-free party game using the PlayStation Move controller, in which players would compete to perform a quick draw with their controller to win a duel. While announced in 2013 as a downloadable game for PlayStation 3, PlayStation 4, PC and Mac, the game was never released.	Greenfly Studios	
Rat Race	The episodic comedy adventure game Rat Race was planned for digital release via PlayStation Network, featuring writing and voice-over by comedian Victor Varnado. The player controlled an office employee trying to get through their day as things go wrong around them. The game was ultimately cancelled due to development issues and Sony's dissatisfaction with the game's quality.	Super-Ego Games	Sony Computer Entertainment
Recoil: Retrograd	Initially announced in 2006 under the title Urban Mysteries, Recoil: Retrograd was an action game in which the player was able to go back and time to prevent a dystopia by defeating "chrono assassins", with their actions in the past affecting the world of the present. Though intended to release in 2010, the game was quietly cancelled, presumably due to being unable to find a publisher.	ZeitGuyz	
Reich	The first person shooter Reich began development at Ignition Entertainment's Florida studio, which was closed in 2010 after US$20 million had already been spent on the project. Development shifted to the publisher's Texas-based UTV True Games studio, only for the company to be liquidated in 2012.	Ignition Florida, UTV True Games	UTV Ignition Games
Ride to Hell: Route 666	Shortly before the release of Ride to Hell: Retribution (2013), the downloadable spinoff Ride to Hell: Route 666 was announced to be releasing on PlayStation 3, Xbox 360, and PC later that year, and would allow players to participate in strategy-based battles between biker gangs. When Retribution released, it received extremely negative reviews and was labeled one of the worst video games of all time, leading Deep Silver to cancel all other Ride to Hell projects.	Black Forest Games	Deep Silver
The Ripper / Blood Dust	A single-player video game that reimagined real-life serial killer Jack the Ripper as an antihero whose victims were actually vampires began development in 2008. At Electronic Arts' behest, the team later added a multiplayer mode that pit teams of Freemasons, police, and vampires against each other. Due to the game's ballooning budget, technical issues resulting from a shift to the Frostbite engine, and marketing having difficulty finding a way to promote the game, EA canceled Ripper in 2011 before it was ever announced. An attempt was made to convert the multiplayer mode into a standalone game, titled Blood Dust, but this was also cancelled.	Visceral Games	Electronic Arts
Rock Band: Japan	A spin-off of the Rock Band series targeted at the Japanese market was announced in 2008, intended to primarily feature J-pop music. The project was later cancelled in 2010, with Harmonix citing the difficulty of licensing Japanese music artists, the cost of shipping instrument controllers overseas, and the limited space available in most Japanese homes.	Harmonix Music Systems / Q Entertainment	
Sacrilegium	Originally announced as a survival horror game coming to the PlayStation 3, Wii U, Xbox 360, and PC platforms, the game never released in any capacity.	Reality Pump Studios	TopWare Interactive
Saint's Row	Following its original Xbox 360 release, a PlayStation 3 port of Saint's Row (2006) was cancelled in favor of focusing on launching Saints Row 2 (2008) on both systems.	Volition	THQ
Scivelation	Originally announced for PC, Xbox 360 and PlayStation 3, the game entered development hell that extended beyond the lifespan of both consoles.	Black Wing Foundation	TopWare Interactive
Scratch: The Ultimate DJ	Scratch: The Ultimate DJ, a rhythm game which utilized a turntable controller, was announced in 2008. In 2009, Activision purchased the game's developer, 7 Studios, leading publisher Genius Products to file a lawsuit against Activision and 7 Studios, claiming the purchase was meant to force a delay of Scratch and ensure that Activision's similar game DJ Hero (2009) would be released first. Following a legal battle, all source code related to Scratch was returned to Genius, and Bedlam Games took over the game's development. In 2010, it was announced that the game would also be coming to Windows and mobile platforms. However, no versions of the game ever saw release.	7 Studios / Commotion Interactive / Bedlam Games	Genius Products, Genco Media
Severity	An Esports-focused first person shooter was announced in 2006, to be developed in collaboration with John Romero and the Cyberathlete Professional League, and would feature cross-platform play between Xbox 360, PlayStation 3, and PC. While planned to launch in 2007, the game failed to materialize.	Escalation Studios	Cyberathlete Professional League
ShadowClan	ShadowClan was a stealth action game set in New York City, with the player controlling a ninja who battles gangs warring for territory, assisted by AI-controlled characters. Conceived by film director John Woo, Woo later dropped out of the project, and Titan Productions failed to find anyone to replace him in the role.	Tiger Hill Entertainment	Titan Productions
Shantae: Half-Genie Hero	Following a successful Kickstarter campaign in 2013, development began on a fourth entry in the Shantae series for PlayStation 3, PlayStation Vita, PlayStation 4, Xbox 360, Xbox One, Wii U, and Windows. In August 2016, it was confirmed that the 360 and PS3 versions had been cancelled, while the other announced ports all released in December of that year. Wayforward noted that less than 1% of Kickstarter backers cited 360 and PS3 as their preferred console in surveys, and felt this low demand would not justify the time and cost needed to develop these versions.	WayForward	WayForward
Shaq Fu: A Legend Reborn	A sequel to Shaq Fu (1994) was crowdfunded via Indiegogo in 2014, with plans to release the finished game for PC, PlayStation 3, PlayStation 4, Xbox 360, Xbox One, and Wii U. In 2018, it was announced that the PS3, 360, and Wii U versions had been cancelled, while the remaining versions were released later that year.	Saber Interactive, Big Deez Productions	Mad Dog Games
Siralim	While the monster-taming RPG Siralim (2016) was initially announced to be releasing on PlayStation 4, PlayStation 3, and PlayStation Vita, the PS3 version was cancelled during development.	Thylacine Studios	Thylacine Studios
Six Days in Fallujah	First announced in 2009, the game was met with significant criticism and controversy given its subject matter and tone. As a result, Konami chose to no longer publish the game in 2010, with Atomic Games declaring bankruptcy the following year after being unable to find a new publisher. In 2021, it was announced that development had restarted under Highwire Games, and the game eventually received an early access release in 2023 for PlayStation 4, PlayStation 5, Xbox One, Xbox Series X/S, and PC.	Atomic Games	Konami
Snapshot	Just prior to its PC release in 2012, versions for the Vita and PlayStation 3 were announced for release by the end of the year, though neither PlayStation version ever materialized.	Retro Affect	Retro Affect
Star Wars: Battlefront III	Following the release of Star Wars: Battlefront II (2005), Free Radical Design was contracted to develop a third entry in the series, with a focus on seamless movement from ground based combat to space battles. However, a change in leadership at LucasArts led to the publisher becoming dissatisfied with the project and withholding payments for six months, eventually resulting in the game's cancellation and Free Radical entering bankruptcy. A prototype for Xbox 360 was leaked in 2016, while a near-final Wii build of the game was uncovered in 2024.	Free Radical Design	LucasArts
Steambot Chronicles 2	A sequel to Steambot Chronicles (2005) was initially announced for PlayStation 2 in 2006 before shifting development to PlayStation 3 the following year. After missing a planned 2008 release date, no new updates on the game emerged until 2011, when it was announced that the game had been cancelled following the 2011 Tōhoku earthquake and tsunami.	Irem	
Talisman	A video game version of the Games Workshop board game Talisman was announced in 2007, to be published by Capcom. The following year, Capcom announced that the game had been cancelled due to a "misfire" early in development, determining that the cost of finding a new developer for the project would outweigh the expected returns.	Big Rooster	Capcom
Tekken X Street Fighter	Announced in 2010 alongside the Capcom-developed Street Fighter X Tekken (2012), which featured characters from the Street Fighter and Tekken franchises in Street Fighter-based 2D battles, Tekken X Street Fighter was Namco Bandai's take on the crossover and would have featured 3D Tekken-style gameplay. However, the game entered development hell that extended beyond the lifespan of the PlayStation 3; to date, the project has been on hold since 2016, with no indication that it will be released.	Namco Bandai Games	Namco Bandai Games
Theseis	Announced at E3 2005 for PlayStation 3, Xbox 360, and PC, developer Track7 games confirmed the following year that the PS3 version had been cancelled due to the high costs of developing for the system, with focus being placed on finishing the 360 and PC versions. However, these ports were also never released, likely due to being unable to find a publisher.	Track7 Games	
They	Following the announcement of the horror first person shooter They in 2007, developer Metropolis Software was acquired by CD Projekt, which moved the team off of They in favor of working on The Witcher, with They ultimately going unreleased.	Metropolis Software	
This Is Vegas	An open world video game centered around the activities in Las Vegas. Announced in 2008, it was cancelled in 2010 after Midway Games went bankrupt and their assets were acquired by Warner Bros. Interactive Entertainment. No official reason was given, but the game's budget up to that point was already at US$50 million, a massive number for a game at that time.	Surreal Software	Midway Games/Warner Bros.
TimeSplitters 4	A fourth entry in the TimeSplitters series was announced in 2008 for release on PlayStation 3 following several years of rumors. However, the project ultimately fizzled out after the game failed to find a publisher, due to both the poor reception of Free Radical Design's previous game Haze (2008) and publishers' unsureness of how to market the game. Following Free Radical's closure in 2014, the studio was re-established in 2021 under the Embracer Group and once again began work on a new TimeSplitters game, but this too was cancelled in 2023 after Embracer closed the studio down. A prototype of the PlayStation 3 version was later discovered in 2024.	Free Radical Design	Crytek
TimeO	TimeO was an action game following two New Yorkers trapped in a parallel shadow version of the city. The game was built using work originally done for a Ghostbusters prototype, which had been cancelled due to ZootFly not acquiring the license. Following the game's initial announcement, little news on the game surfaced over the following year, with the game itself ultimately never materializing	ZootFly	
TMNT	A PlayStation 3 version of TMNT (2007) was shown at press events, but never released.	Ubisoft Montreal	Ubisoft
To End All Wars	A first person shooter set during World War I was announced in 2007, but never materialized.	Kuju Entertainment	
Tom Clancy's Rainbow 6: Patriots	A new entry in the Tom Clancy's Rainbow Six series was announced in 2011 for Xbox 360, PlayStation 3, and PC via a trailer with pre-rendered target footage. In 2013, it was announced that the game had shifted to the next generation of consoles, though the project experienced several issues in the transition and needed to be rebooted. By 2014, it had been confirmed that Patriots had been cancelled and that the series would be rebooted with Tom Clancy's Rainbow Six: Siege (2015).	Ubisoft	Ubisoft
Until Dawn	Development began on the PlayStation 3, with a planned release year of 2013, and was initially designed around the use of the PlayStation Move accessory. The decision was later made to retool the game and expand its scope by shifting development to the PlayStation 4, where it released in 2015.	Supermassive Games	Sony Computer Entertainment
Voltage	The racing game Voltage was scheduled for release on PlayStation 3, Xbox 360, and PC in 2008, but never materialized.	IBA	
The Wall	The Wall, a shooter set in a dystopian future, was first announced in 2006 for PlayStation 3 and Xbox 360, but failed to materialize.	World Forge / Burut CT	
WarDevil / Project Kane	Originally announced as WarDevil in 2004 for the PlayStation 3, an Xbox 360 version was later announced as well. The game was planned to be similar in concept to the Dynasty Warriors by Digi-Guys, a newly created developer subsidiary by publisher Ignition Entertainment. The game went through a lengthy and difficult seven year development period, including a brief rebrand/reworking of the game as Project Kane to salvage work done on it, but it was ultimately cancelled, with Ignition going out of business shortly afterwards.	Digi-Guys	Ignition Entertainment
Warrior's Lair	Originally announced as Ruin by Sony at E3 2011 as a cross-platform PlayStation 3 and Vita game due out in 2012. The game was heavily promoted across 2011, with outlets such as IGN being given access to playable builds of the game, but the status on the game went quiet moving into 2012, where it missed E3 2012 and its release year entirely. By July 2013, the game was announced to be cancelled on both platforms.	Idol Minds	Sony Computer Entertainment
The Witcher: Rise of the White Wolf	A port of The Witcher (2007) was announced for PlayStation 3 and Xbox 360 in 2008, and would feature various enhancements compared to the PC original. In 2009, developer Widescreen games announced they had put the project on hold due to payments from publisher CD Projekt being late. CD Project responded that the late payments had been due to Widescreen missing deadlines and the port's lackluster quality, and that they had terminated their relationship.	Widescreen Games	CD Projekt
Wonder Flick	A cross-platform JRPG announced for iOS, Android, Nintendo 3DS, Xbox One, PlayStation 3, PlayStation 4, PlayStation Vita, and Wii U. The game was intended to support cross-saving, allowing the player to save progress on one platform and pick up where they left off on another. Gameplay also occurred on two separate screens, whether it be on dual screen platforms like Wii U and 3DS, or through other means like remote play. While the mobile versions released in early 2014 in Japan, it suffered from a troubled launch and short lifespan, being shut down just a year later, leading to the cancellation of all console versions.	Level-5	Level-5
World in Conflict: Soviet Assault	Following the release World in Conflict (2007) on PC, the Soviet Assault expansion pack was announced, along with standalone ports for PlayStation 3 and Xbox 360. The project was cancelled following the merger of Activision and Vivendi Universal, only for Ubisoft to acquire the rights to the franchise. While the PC expansion was released in 2009, Ubisoft decided not to release the console ports.	Massive Entertainment	Ubisoft
WWE Brawl	A new WWE wrestling game, WWE Brawl, was announced in 2011 for release on PlayStation 3, Xbox 360, and Wii. Unlike THQ's annual WWE releases, Brawl was a spin-off intended to be a more fast-paced party fighting game akin to Super Smash Bros. or Power Stone. However, the game was never released, presumably due to THQ's financial difficulties at the time. In 2024, a prototype of a previously unknown Nintendo 3DS version was found and shared online.	THQ	THQ
WWE Smackdown vs Raw 2007	While announced for PlayStation 3 alongside other versions of the game, the decision was made to cancel the port due to its rate of development, which would have seen it released well after the other versions; the series would come to PlayStation 3 a year later with WWE Smackdown vs Raw 2008.	Yuke's	THQ
Zombies!!!	A video game adaptation of the board game Zombies!!! was announced in 2008 for digital release on Xbox 360 and PS3. However, publisher Twilight Creations later announced the next year that Big Rooster would no longer be working on the game and that they were seeking a new developer. The game was ultimately released only on Windows Phone in 2011, developed by Babaroga.	Big Rooster	Twilight Creations Inc.
Zoombies: Animales de la Muerte	First announced exclusively for WiiWare in 2008, this version was cancelled in 2011 when the developers failed to keep the game within the WiiWare size limits. While PlayStation 3 and Xbox 360 versions were announced as replacements, those too were cancelled, and the game only saw release for iOS mobile devices in 2013.	High Voltage Software	MTV Games
