= List of cancelled Xbox 360 games =

The Xbox 360 is a video game console released by Microsoft in 2005. It was their second console, following the original Xbox's 2001 release. The platform was a success, and went on to being the best selling Western-developed console to date, with rich software support from third party game publishers. Despite this, factors like increased budget and scope involved with the move into high-definition video game development lead to the cancellation of games. This list documents games that were confirmed for the Xbox 360 at some point, but did not end up being released for it in any capacity.

== Games ==
There are currently 104 games on this list. (Note: This number is always up to date by this script.)

List of cancelled Xbox 360 games
Title(s)	Notes/Reasons	Developer	Publisher
2 Days to Vegas	A game in which the player character traveled between multiple American cities to reach Las Vegas began development in 2003 and was announced in 2005, planned to release first on Xbox 360 and PC before coming to PlayStation 3 later. Though no new media of the game was shown after 2008, developer Steel Monkeys continued to assert it was in development, though the remainder of the console generation passed without the game being released.	Steel Monkeys	
Aero-Cross	As part of Namco Generations, a line of modern remakes of classic Namco arcade games, a revival of the arcade game Metro-Cross (1985) was announced in 2010 for release on PlayStation 3 and Xbox 360. However, Namco remained silent for some time regarding the game's progress until 2012, when it was announced that Aero-Cross had been cancelled and there would be no further Namco Generations games.	Namco Bandai Games	Namco Bandai Games
Afterfall: Insanity	A version of the 2011 Windows release was planned for PlayStation 3 and Xbox 360, but never released.	Intoxicate Studios	Nicolas Entertainment Group
Alhambra	A video game adaption of the Alhambra board game was announced for the Xbox 360 in 2006, but was cancelled due to "unforeseen circumstances" by 2008.	Microsoft	Microsoft
Ashes Cricket 2013	Originally released on PC to scathing reviews, the game was shortly after pulled from Steam, and planned console versions for Wii U, PlayStation 3, and Xbox 360 were cancelled.	Trickstar Games	505 Games
The Avengers	A first-person brawler video game set to be released in 2012 to coincide with the release of the 2012 film of the same name was announced for many platforms, Xbox 360 included. However, THQ's financial difficulties at the time led to multiple games being delayed or cancelled, and with this project being tied to the timing of the film's release, it was ultimately scrapped and not released on any platforms.	Blue Tongue Entertainment	THQ
Banjo-Kazooie remake	Prior to developing Banjo-Kazooie: Nuts & Bolts (2008), members of Rare's team proposed creating a remake of the original Banjo-Kazooie (1998) where the characters became aware they were in a remake and were repeating actions they had already done in the original game, which in effect would lead to characters acting differently, with the remake eventually branching off into very different events from the original game. The idea was rejected by management due to fears of how the game would be perceived; concurrently worrying that some would be unhappy that it wasn't completely a new game, while others would never play far enough to realize how much it differed from the original game.	Rare	Microsoft
Beyond Good and Evil 2	Announced in 2008 as a sequel to the original Beyond Good and Evil (2003) in development for the Xbox 360 and PlayStation 3 platforms. As of 2024, the game is still in-development and unreleased on any platform, though the developers announced that development had moved on to more powerful hardware, as both of its original platforms were deemed too under-powered for their ambitious plans for the game.	Ubisoft Montpellier	Ubisoft
Black Widow	An action game in which players battled aliens using a giant spider mech capable of climbing most objects and surfaces. The game never moved beyond the prototype phase, but the Black Widow itself was planned to be reused in Kameo 2, which was also never released. While not officially announced prior to its cancellation, the game's existence was publicly revealed through a retrospective documentary featuring concept art and development footage, released as a bonus feature in Rare's anniversary compilation game Rare Replay (2015).	Rare	Microsoft
Blue Steel (Superman)	A Superman game in development for the Wii, PlayStation 3, and Xbox 360 platforms in 2008. Initially intended as a tie-in to a proposed Superman Returns film sequel, the game had a troubled development period and had to be retooled when said film sequel was cancelled. In 2009, both Brash Entertainment and Factor 5 were impacted by the Great Recession and closed down, ending the game's development.	Factor 5	Brash Entertainment
Bonk: Brink of Extinction	A downloadable revival of the Bonk series was planned for release on PlayStation 3, Xbox 360, and Wii, but was cancelled in 2011 when Hudson Soft was closed down.	Pi Studios	Hudson Soft
Brothers in Arms: Furious 4	A new entry in the Brothers in Arms series was announced at E3 2011, and would have been an over-the-top take on World War II shooting games with four player cooperative play. Developer Gearbox Software later decided that the game would not be a good fit for the Brothers in Arms series, converting the project into an original IP. Furious 4 was ultimately cancelled, though elements of the gameplay would later be utilized in Battleborn (2016).	Gearbox Software	Ubisoft
Call of Duty: Devil's Brigade	A Call of Duty entry by Underground Development was cancelled after nine months of development in March 2008. While no one reason lead to its cancellation, the massive success of Infinity Ward's Call of Duty: Modern Warfare, the Activision Blizzard merger, and Underground Development's closure shortly afterwards all complicated plans for its release.	Underground Development	Activision
Cipher Complex	First announced in 2006 as Edge of Reality's first attempt to create their own IP after many years of creating licensed games or ports for other companies. The game was described as a new sort of stealth-based game for the Xbox 360 and PlayStation 3, but the game never materialized and Edge of Reality eventually went out of business.	Edge of Reality	Sega
The City of Metronome	The 3D puzzle platformer The City of Metronome was announced at E3 2005 for then-next generation consoles. The game struggled to find a publisher, and was ultimately placed on indefinite hold in 2007.	Tarsier Studios	
The Dark Eye: Demonicon	Versions for the PlayStation 3 and Xbox 360 were announced, planned for release after the PC version, but these console ports failed to materialize.	Noumena Studios	Kalypso Media
Dead or Alive: Code Chronos	Announced by Team Ninja head Tomonobu Itagaki in 2005 as a prequel game to the Dead or Alive series that explored the origin stories of characters Kasumi and Ayane. Itagaki left the company in 2008, and the new lead, Yousuke Hayashi announced in 2010 that the team had ceased work on the project five years prior. Formal development had not started, and they had only created a basic framework for its design prior to its cancellation.	Team Ninja	Tecmo
Deer Hunter Tournament	The game was announced by Atari for release on PC and Xbox 360 in June 2008, but only the PC version was released.	Southlogic Studios	Atari
Devil's Third	Initially beginning as an Xbox 360 exclusive to be published by Microsoft Game Studios, the partnership fell through and THQ picked up the game, planning to release it on Xbox 360, PlayStation 3, and PC. These plans were dropped as a result of THQ's bankruptcy, and the game would eventually be published by Nintendo in 2016 as a Wii U exclusive.	Valhalla Game Studios	THQ
Dirty Harry	A video game continuing the story of the 1971 film Dirty Harry was announced in 2005, and was set to feature Clint Eastwood reprising his role as Harry Callahan. While planned to launch on PlayStation 3 and Xbox 360 in 2007, the project was cancelled that year due to development issues.	The Collective	Warner Bros. Interactive
Division 9	A first-person shooter game announced for the Xbox 360 and PC platforms. The game involved survival horror elements where the player would have to avoid zombies, with gameplay similar to the Left 4 Dead series. The game was cancelled due to a lack of faith in the popularity of its premise.	Irrational Games	Take Two Interactive
Earth No More	Earth No More was a first person shooter set in England, with the player characters dealing with an environmental apocalypse. Initially announced in 2008, the game was never released due to financial difficulties at 3D Realms.	Recoil Games	3D Realms
Elveon	The high fantasy RPG Elveon was announced in 2005, but its developer suffered financial problems and was forced to shut down in 2008. Though Elveon was said to be transferred to another developer, it was never completed.	10tacle Studios	
Epic Mickey	Development for the game was originally started as a PlayStation 3, PC, and Xbox 360 release. The rise of the popularity of Nintendo's Wii platform lead to Disney reps asking if a Wii version could be developed too. When developers expressed concern with getting a Wii version up and running as well due to its very different hardware, after further review, they felt a Wii release was most important, and cancelled all other versions before releasing the game on the Wii in 2010.	Junction Point Studios	Disney Interactive Studios
Eternal Light	The cooperative action game Eternal Light, originally announced in 2007 under the codename "Project Witches", was planned for release in 2011, but never released due to developer Revistronic's bankruptcy in 2011.	Revistronic	
Faith and a .45	In 2008, Deadline Games announced a cooperative shooter starring a Bonnie and Clyde style pair of outlaws during the Great Depression. However, they were to unable to find a publisher, and the company filed for bankruptcy in 2009.	Deadline Games	
Fallen Frontier	Fallen Frontier was a digital-only game being developed for Xbox 360, PlayStation 3 and PC by Moonshot games, a studio founded by former members of Bungie. While the game was positively received by players at trade shows, the company struggled to find a publisher due to changes in the market, and the game was cancelled in 2013.	Moonshot Games	
The Fast and the Furriest	A proposed racing video game by Rare for the Xbox 360 as a spiritual successor to Diddy Kong Racing (1997). The game would have featured various playable characters from other Rare games, such as Joanna Dark and Banjo & Kazooie, and would have allowed players to customize their vehicles and alter the track during a race. While concept art and assets were created, the game never entered full production. While not officially announced prior to its cancellation, the game's existence was publicly revealed through a retrospective documentary featuring concept art and development footage, released as a bonus feature in Rare's anniversary compilation game Rare Replay (2015).	Rare	Microsoft
Fortress	Fortress was the codename for a planned spinoff in the Final Fantasy series, intended as a sequel to the events of Final Fantasy XII (2006). While production began in 2009, Square Enix expressed dissatisfaction with the game's art style and withheld milestone payments to developer Grin throughout development. As a result of this, combined with lower-than-expected sales from the company's other games released that year, Grin suffered heavy financial losses and the company was forced to shut down six months into the development of Fortress.	Grin	Square Enix
Frame City Killer	Frame City Killer was an action game in which players controlled an assassin in a near future setting attempting to take down a drug kingpin. While originally intended to release early in 2006, the game's release date slipped to later in the year before disappearing altogether.	Namco Bandai Games	Namco Bandai Games
GoldenEye 007	In 2008, Rare and 4J Studios spent several months developing a remaster of GoldenEye 007 (1997) for Xbox Live Arcade, which would include online multiplayer and the ability to toggle between the original and updated graphics. While the remaster was only months away from completion, the project was halted after Rare owner Microsoft, original publisher Nintendo, then-current James Bond publisher Activision, and James Bond rights holders Eon Productions and MGM could not come to a licensing agreement. An unrelated remake, GoldenEye 007 Reloaded, was released by Activision for 360 in 2011, while a separate remaster of the original by Code Mystics would be released for Xbox One in 2022. In 2021, the near final build of the 360 remaster was leaked online.	Rare, 4J Studios	Microsoft
Gotham by Gaslight	A video game adaptation of Gotham by Gaslight, an alternate universe Batman story set in the 1800s, began development at Day 1 Studios, but was cancelled after publisher THQ failed to acquire the license to use the Batman IP. Early concept art and video footage later surfaced in 2012.	Day 1 Studios	THQ
Guillermo del Toro's Sundown	Announced in E3 2006, Sundown was a post-apocalyptic zombie game similar to Left 4 Dead, developed in collaboration with filmmaker Guillermo del Toro. However, del Toro departed the project later that year, and the game was never released.	Terminal Reality	Ubisoft
Gun Loco	A third-person shooter in which players control inmates on a distant prison planet was announced in 2010 for release the following year. In 2011, the game was cancelled without explanation.	Square-Enix	Square-Enix
Untitled Halo MMO / Project Titan	An entry in the Halo franchise that would have played as a massively multiplayer online game was in development for the Xbox 360. While never officially announced, many details were leaked in 2008, and reported upon by the video game press after the fact. The game was reportedly in development across 2006 and 2007. The game was prototyped, but only screenshots of gameplay were leaked onto the internet. The game was confirmed as cancelled by 2008, and Ensemble closed down the following year.	Ensemble Studios	Microsoft
Halo Mega Bloks	In 2013, development began on a Halo game based around the Mega Bloks construction toyline, under the codename Haggar. The game would have been a more family friendly take on Halo, with many comparing the gameplay and tone to TT Games' Lego video games. While the project was cancelled before being announced, its existence would become known in 2017 when prototype footage was uploaded to YouTube.	n-Space	Microsoft
Harker	A video game based on Bram Stoker's Dracula. Announced in 2007, the game was placed on hiatus, and later cancelled, so the team could focus on developing Silent Hill: Homecoming (2008) instead.	Double Helix Games	Konami
Heat	A video game sequel to the 1995 film Heat was announced in 2006. While some pre-production work was done, and the company entered into negotiations for the film's cast to reprise their roles, the game never entered full production, as Gearbox Software was already busy with Borderlands and Aliens: Colonial Marines and could not fully commit to a new project.	Gearbox Software	Titan Productions
Hei$t	An open world video game about a group of criminals performing elaborate thefts was announced in 2007 for PlayStation 3, Xbox 360, and PC. However, technical issues with the PS3 version combined with a strained relationship between its developer and publisher ultimately led to the game's cancellation.	inXile Entertainment	Codemasters
Highlander: The Game	A video game based on the Highlander franchise was announced in 2008. However, the game was officially cancelled in 2010.	WideScreen Games	Eidos Interactive
Indiana Jones and the Staff of Kings	A video game in the Indiana Jones franchise was in development for the Xbox 360 for 5 years between 2004 and 2009. The plan had been to create a high budget version of the game for the Xbox 360, PlayStation 3, and PC platforms as a collaboration between LucasArts and Bethesda Softworks, and outsource different low-budget versions for weaker platforms such as the Wii and PlayStation 2 to smaller developers. Development issues lead to many delays and a full reboot of the project, and the lack of progress, combined with the company's fear of being unable to compete with the critically acclaimed Uncharted: Drake's Fortune (2007), lead to the eventual cancellation of the high-end versions of the game, while the low-end budget releases ended up being the only ones to release.	Bethesda Softworks	LucasArts
inSANE	The survival horror game inSANE was announced in 2010, to be developed in collaboration with film director Guillermo del Toro, planned for release in 2010. In 2012, shortly before going out of business, THQ announced the cancellation of inSANE, with the game's IP rights transferring to del Toro.	Volition / THQ	THQ
Interstellar Marines	Initially announced to be coming to PlayStation 3, Xbox 360, and PC, only the PC version was released in 2013.	Zero Point Software	Zero Point Software
Kameo 2	A sequel to Kameo (2005) was in development by Rare for the Xbox 360 following the completion of the original title. The title would have featured a darker fantasy world, now upgraded with industrial revolution-era technology. A playable prototype was created, but the game was ultimately cancelled for undisclosed reasons. While not officially announced prior to its cancellation, the game's existence was publicly revealed through a retrospective documentary featuring concept art and development footage, released as a bonus feature in Rare's anniversary compilation game Rare Replay (2015).	Rare	Microsoft
Killing Day	A first-person shooter announced by Ubisoft as a showcase of what was possible with the then-new Xbox 360 and PlayStation 3 hardware. First announced and shown in video form at E3 2005, Ubisoft went quiet on the project shortly afterwards, and it never materialized in a capacity. The game was cancelled midway through development, though patent renewals for the name still occurred well after the fact in 2009 and 2013.	Ubisoft	Ubisoft
Kingdom Under Fire II	Initially announced for Xbox 360 in 2009, followed by the announcement of a PlayStation 3 version the following year, the game underwent a long and protracted development period that lasted beyond the lifespan of both systems, ultimately releasing only on Windows in 2019.	Blueside, Phantagram	Gameforge
Legacy of Kain: Dead Sun	A sixth entry in the Legacy of Kain series began development for PlayStation 3 and Xbox 360, but was cancelled in 2013 during the early phases of production. Work done on the game's multiplayer mode was later repurposed and converted into a free-to-play multiplayer game, Nosgoth, which entered an open beta phase in 2015 before being shut down in 2016. The existence of Dead Sun was later revealed through footage that leaked in 2015.	Climax Studios	Square Enix
The Lord of the Rings: The White Council	Announced in 2006 for the Xbox 360 and PlayStation 3 as Electronic Art's answer to Skyrim utilizing the AI from The Sims's games. However, it was cancelled in the following year, with EA reportedly unhappy with initial progress with the game. EA partnered with Pandemic Studios to create The Lord of the Rings: Conquest (2009) instead.	EA Redwood Shores	Electronic Arts
Lords of the Fallen	Initially announced to be released in 2013 for PlayStation 3 Xbox 360, and PC, the game was heavily overhauled and it was decided to move to more powerful hardware, with the console versions releasing on PlayStation 4 and Xbox One in 2014.	Deck13 Interactive, CI Games	CI Games
Mad Max	A video game adaptation of the Mad Max franchise was announced at E3 2013, and was set to release the following year on PlayStation 3, PlayStation 4, PC, Xbox 360, and Xbox One. Following a delay, it was announced in May 2015 that the ports for the two older systems had been cancelled due to hardware limitations; the other versions would be released later that year.	Avalanche Studios	Warner Bros. Interactive Entertainment
Magical Drop V	Ports of Magical Drop V (2012) were announced for Xbox 360 and PlayStation 3, but never released.	Golgoth Studio	UTV Ignition Entertainment
Marvel Chaos	An intended follow-up to Marvel Nemesis: Rise of the Imperfects (2005) was in development by EA Chicago for the Xbox 360 and PlayStation 3. The studio was dissolved in November 2007, and the game and series were canceled in January 2008 when Electronic Arts changed its portfolio strategy and terminated its partnership with Marvel.	EA Chicago	Electronic Arts
Matter	Matter was announced at Microsoft's E3 2012 conference, only to be cancelled about a year later. Matter would have used the Kinect peripheral and been set in a universe similar to that of Tron, with futuristic, industrial graphics, and featured small, metallic balls as the main characters. Originally, filmmaker Gore Verbinski, director of Pirates of the Caribbean and Rango, was attached to the project.	Blind Wink Games	Microsoft Game Studios
Mega Man Universe	A 2.5D entry in the Mega Man series was announced in 2010 for digital release on Xbox 360 and PlayStation 3, functioning as both a remake of Mega Man 2 (1988) and a creation suite that would allow players to customize their own characters and levels. Following the departure of Mega Man series producer Keiji Inafune later that year, news on the game went silent until March 2011, when it was officially cancelled. In a subsequent interview, Capcom's Christian Svensson explained that while Universe was "pretty far in production", the quality of the game did not meet the company's standards, leading to the decision to cancel the game.	Capcom	Capcom
Metal Gear Solid 4: Guns of the Patriots	In 2023, former Kojima Productions producer Ryan Payton stated that a separate team in Konami's R&D department had produced a port of Metal Gear Solid 4 for the Xbox 360 that was "running beautifully and smoothly." Despite this, a version for the console was rejected due to the game's significant memory requirements for its time, which would've necessitated releasing the 360 version on multiple HD DVD discs. Only the PlayStation 3's Blu-ray format was at capacity to fully store the eventual 50GB game data on a single, dual-layered disc. Director Hideo Kojima previously alluded to file size issues when explaining why Metal Gear Solid: The Legacy Collection, which included it, would not receive a 360 version upon its release in 2013. It would not receive a release on Xbox platforms until 2026, as part of Metal Gear Solid: Master Collection Vol. 2 for the Xbox Series X/S.	Kojima Productions	Konami
Mortal Kombat X	Initially announced alongside versions for Xbox One, PlayStation 4, and PC, the Xbox 360 and PlayStation 3 versions were delayed past the other versions' release due to development difficulties. Eventually, it was announced that the two versions had been cancelled due to NetherRealm's inability to get the game running at acceptable quality on the older consoles.	NetherRealm Studios	Warner Bros. Interactive Entertainment
Mr. T: The Videogame	In 2009, ZootFly announced that they were planning to release a series of video games based on the Mr. T graphic novels, the first of which would be an action adventure game featuring Mr. T and Will Wright battling Nazis. However, no Mr. T games from ZootFly ever materialized.	ZootFly	
NBA Elite 11	Following several releases in the NBA Live series, EA Sports attempted to rebrand the series as NBA Elite, with the title being announced for the Xbox 360, PlayStation 3, and iOS. However, it suffered heavy development troubles, and after delaying the release, the decision was made to cancel it entirely a week before its intended street date, with subsequent games returning to the NBA Live name. Despite the cancellation, some PlayStation 3 copies had already been shipped to stores and have since become rare collector's items. Only the iOS mobile version of the game ever officially released.	EA Canada	EA Sports
NBA Live 13	Following the cancellation of NBA Elite 11, EA spent two years preparing to relaunch the NBA Live series, announcing NBA Live 13 at E3 2012. Months later, EA announced the game had been cancelled, feeling that the game's quality was not sufficient and deciding to focus on NBA Live 14 as the return for the series instead.	EA Tiburon	EA Sports
Necessary Force	A new IP announced in 2009 to help set apart the financially struggling Midway Games from other video game companies during the Great Recession. The game was to combine aspects of Grand Theft Auto's open world with element of film noir. However, Warner Bros buyout of Midway resulted in the company's closure and the game's ultimate cancellation.	Midway Studios Newcastle	Midway Games
Omikron: Karma	A sequel to The Nomad Soul (1999) was planned for release on PlayStation 3, Xbox 360, and PC, but was cancelled in favor of focusing on Heavy Rain (2010).	Quantic Dream	
The Outsider	First announced in 2005 as a showpiece of what was possible with the then-upcoming Xbox 360 and PlayStation 3 hardware, the game experienced a protracted 5–6 years of development time, followed by years of limbo status, before it was declared "stopped" and "probably gone for good" by a head developer in 2014. It was centered around a CIA Agent who was wrongly accused of a crime, and his efforts as a fugitive to clear his name. While no official reason was given for its cancellation, reports indicated that the developers may have struggled with the game's open ended nature, as the game was to present the player with many ways paths and endings through the game. They struggled to find a publisher for the game as well.	Frontier Developments	
Perfect Dark Core / Perfect Dark Vengeance	Following the release of Perfect Dark Zero (2005), Rare began development on two other entries in the Perfect Dark series, known as Perfect Dark Core and Perfect Dark Vengeance. Set years after the events of Perfect Dark (2000), the two games would have formed both halves of a single overarching narrative, with the two games planned to be developed and released back-to-back, reducing downtime between releases and allowing Vengeance to be developed more efficiently by reusing technology and assets from Core. However, Microsoft ultimately declined to approve the project, due to the poor sales of Perfect Dark Zero and the belief that the games' sci-fi shooter genre overlapped too much with their already active Halo and Gears of War franchises.	Rare	Microsoft
Pirates of the Caribbean: Armada of the Damned	An action RPG set in the world of the Pirates of the Caribbean films was announced in 2009 for Xbox 360, PlayStation 3, and PC. Despite positive pre-release reception, developer Propaganda games experienced a restructuring that saw the game's development team laid off in 2010.	Propaganda Games	Disney Interactive Studios
Possession	Possession was a real-time strategy game in which players controlled a zombie who amassed an army of other zombies to take down the corporation responsible for his transformation. The game was put on indefinite hold in 2006 due to the developer's inability to secure a publishing deal.	Blitz Games / Volatile Games	
Postal III	Postal III was initially announced for release on Windows and Xbox 360; however, the game was only released for Windows in 2011.	Running with Scissors	Akella
Prey 2	A sequel to Prey (2006) was announced shortly after the first game's release, though substantial work would not begun until 2009 when original publisher 3D Realms transferred the rights to the property to Zenimax Media. The game was re-announced by Bethesda Softworks in 2011, though original developer Human Head Studios ceased working on the project later that year for unspecified reasons. Following several years of rumors about the project's status, the game was formally cancelled in 2014. A new Prey game would not be released until the series reboot in 2017.	Human Head Studios	Bethesda Softworks
Project CARS	Originally announced for the Xbox 360, Wii U, PlayStation 3, and Windows, the PS3 and 360 versions were cancelled in favor of PlayStation 4 and Xbox One versions, while the Wii U version was cancelled.	Slightly Mad Studios	Bandai Namco
Recoil: Retrograd	Initially announced in 2006 under the title Urban Mysteries, Recoil: Retrograd was an action game in which the player was able to go back and time to prevent a dystopia by defeating "chrono assassins", with their actions in the past affecting the world of the present. Though intended to release in 2010, the game was quietly cancelled, presumably due to being unable to find a publisher.	ZeitGuyz	
Ride to Hell: Route 666	Shortly before the release of Ride to Hell: Retribution (2013), the downloadable spinoff Ride to Hell: Route 666 was announced to be releasing on PlayStation 3, Xbox 360, and PC later that year, and would allow players to participate in strategy-based battles between biker gangs. When Retribution released, it received extremely negative reviews and was labeled one of the worst video games of all time, leading Deep Silver to cancel all other Ride to Hell projects.	Black Forest Games	Deep Silver
Untitled Road Rash reboot	A reboot of the franchise was announce in 2006 — the first new entry in 16 years — for the Xbox 360. The game never materialized, though some early concept art for the game leaked onto the internet in the following years.	Electronic Arts	Electronic Arts
Sabreman Stampede	Announced at E3 2001 as Donkey Kong Racing, a GameCube sequel to Diddy Kong Racing (1997), the game was cancelled in 2002 when developer Rare was bought by Microsoft, making them lose access to Nintendo's Donkey Kong IP. Rare briefly attempted to rework the game on Xbox and later Xbox 360 as Sabreman Stampede, utilizing their Sabreman IP in place of Donkey Kong, but this game was also cancelled.	Rare	Microsoft
Sacrilegium	Originally announced as a survival horror game coming to the Xbox 360, Wii U, PlayStation 3, and PC platforms, the game never released in any capacity.	Reality Pump Studios	TopWare Interactive
Scivelation	Originally announced for PC, Xbox 360 and PlayStation 3, the game entered development hell that extended beyond the lifespan of both consoles.	Black Wing Foundation	TopWare Interactive
Scratch: The Ultimate DJ	Scratch: The Ultimate DJ, a rhythm game which utilized a turntable controller, was announced in 2008. In 2009, Activision purchased the game's developer, 7 Studios, leading publisher Genius Products to file a lawsuit against Activision and 7 Studios, claiming the purchase was meant to force a delay of Scratch and ensure that Activision's similar game DJ Hero (2009) would be released first. Following a legal battle, all source code related to Scratch was returned to Genius, and Bedlam Games took over the game's development. In 2010, it was announced that the game would also be coming to Windows and mobile platforms. However, no versions of the game ever saw release.	7 Studios / Commotion Interactive / Bedlam Games	Genius Products, Genco Media
Severity	An Esports-focused first person shooter was announced in 2006, to be developed in collaboration with John Romero and the Cyberathlete Professional League, and would feature cross-platform play between Xbox 360, PlayStation 3, and PC. While planned to launch in 2007, the game failed to materialize.	Escalation Studios	Cyberathlete Professional League
ShadowClan	ShadowClan was a stealth action game set in New York City, with the player controlling a ninja who battles gangs warring for territory, assisted by AI-controlled characters. Conceived by film director John Woo, Woo later dropped out of the project, and Titan Productions failed to find anyone to replace him in the role.	Tiger Hill Entertainment	Titan Productions
Shantae: Half-Genie Hero	Following a successful Kickstarter campaign in 2013, development began on a fourth entry in the Shantae series for Xbox 360, Xbox One, PlayStation 3, PlayStation Vita, PlayStation 4, Wii U, and Windows. In August 2016, it was confirmed that the 360 and PS3 versions had been cancelled, while the other announced ports all released in December of that year. Wayforward noted that less than 1% of Kickstarter backers cited 360 and PS3 as their preferred console in surveys, and felt this low demand would not justify the time and cost needed to develop these versions.	WayForward	WayForward
Shaq Fu: A Legend Reborn	A sequel to Shaq Fu (1994) was crowdfunded via Indiegogo in 2014, with plans to release the finished game for PC, PlayStation 3, PlayStation 4, Xbox 360, Xbox One, and Wii U. In 2018, it was announced that the PS3, 360, and Wii U versions had been cancelled, while the remaining versions were released later that year.	Saber Interactive, Big Deez Productions	Mad Dog Games
Six Days in Fallujah	First announced in 2009, the game was met with significant criticism and controversy given its subject matter and tone. As a result, Konami chose to no longer publish the game in 2010, with Atomic Games declaring bankruptcy the following year after being unable to find a new publisher. In 2021, it was announced that development had restarted under Highwire Games, and the game eventually received an early access release in 2023 for PlayStation 4, PlayStation 5, Xbox One, Xbox Series X/S, and PC.	Atomic Games	Konami
The Sopranos: Road to Respect	Originally announced in May 2006 for the PlayStation 2 and Xbox 360, the latter version was cancelled 2 months later. Publisher THQ cited the fact that the developer "7 Studios" was stretched too thin to focus on a more advanced Xbox 360 version, so it was scrapped in favor of concentrating on releasing the standard PS2 version, which released as scheduled in November of the same year.	7 Studios	THQ
SpongeBob SquarePants and the Nicktoons: Gravjet Racing	This game was being worked on throughout 2009. It was a racing game that was to feature characters from Nicktoons such as SpongeBob SquarePants and The Ren & Stimpy Show. The game was complete but was ultimately cancelled due to financial issues. A build dating to November 28, 2009 was found and uploaded to the Internet Archive in 2024.	Santa Cruz Games	MTV Games
Star Wars: Battlefront III	Following the release of Star Wars: Battlefront II (2005), Free Radical Design was contracted to develop a third entry in the series, with a focus on seamless movement from ground based combat to space battles. However, a change in leadership at LucasArts led to the publisher becoming dissatisfied with the project and withholding payments for six months, eventually resulting in the game's cancellation and Free Radical entering bankruptcy. A prototype for Xbox 360 was leaked in 2016, while a near-final Wii build of the game was uncovered in 2024.	Free Radical Design	LucasArts
Star Wars: First Assault	A first person shooter set in the Star Wars universe, the game was one of multiple Star Wars projects cancelled in 2013 as a result of LucasArts shutting down following Disney's purchase of LucasFilm. Pre-release builds later began circulating online, with fans attempting to independently restore the game.	LucasArts	LucasArts
Star Wars Rogue Squadron: X-Wing vs. Tie Fighter	After the cancellation of the Star Wars: Rogue Squadron compilation for the original Xbox, the team moved on to creating a new title in the series as a launch title for the Xbox 360. The title would have emphasized online multiplayer, a first for the series. However, publisher LucasArts was concerned about the financial risk of creating a launch title, and cancelled the game.	Factor 5	LucasArts
Stormlands / Defiance	The game was never announced publicly during its extensive development period, but rather detailed by Eurogamer well after the fact in 2017. Development started in 2006 on the Xbox 360 as a third person action role playing game in the vein of Fallout: New Vegas running on the Dungeon Siege 3 game engine. The team created a pitch demo on the 360 that managed to greenlight the project with Microsoft, but the game would experience years of revisions and changes at the request of Microsoft. As the game shifted to being an Xbox One launch title, complications of scope and technology accumulated, and Microsoft eventually cancelled the game in 2012. Some work on the game was salvaged to be used in their future PC release Tyranny (2016).	Obsidian Entertainment	Microsoft
Sundown	A survival horror game set in a post-apocalyptic world, with players gathering weapons and supplies during the day and having to defend themselves from infected mutants at night. A prototype was produced during a company game jam, but the project ultimately did not enter full production. While not officially announced prior to its cancellation, the game's existence was publicly revealed through a retrospective documentary featuring concept art and development footage, released as a bonus feature in Rare's anniversary compilation game Rare Replay (2015).	Rare	Microsoft
Tailwind	A flight-based game in which players control a courier piloting an aircraft to make deliveries, using their money earned to purchase new aircraft and access new contracts. The game never moved beyond the prototype phase. While not officially announced prior to its cancellation, the game's existence was publicly revealed through a retrospective documentary featuring concept art and development footage, released as a bonus feature in Rare's anniversary compilation game Rare Replay (2015).	Rare	Microsoft
Talisman	A video game version of the Games Workshop board game Talisman was announced in 2007, to be published by Capcom. The following year, Capcom announced that the game had been cancelled due to a "misfire" early in development, determining that the cost of finding a new developer for the project would outweigh the expected returns.	Big Rooster	Capcom
Tekken X Street Fighter	Announced in 2010 alongside the Capcom-developed Street Fighter X Tekken (2012), which featured characters from the Street Fighter and Tekken franchises in Street Fighter-based 2D battles, Tekken X Street Fighter was Bandai Namco's take on the crossover and would have featured 3D Tekken-style gameplay. However, the game entered development hell that extended beyond the lifespan of the Xbox 360; to date, the project has been on hold since 2016, with no indication that it will be released.	Bandai Namco	Bandai Namco
Theseis	Announced at E3 2005 for PlayStation 3, Xbox 360, and PC, developer Track7 games confirmed the following year that the PS3 version had been cancelled due to the high costs of developing for the system, with focus being placed on finishing the 360 and PC versions. However, these ports were also never released, likely due to being unable to find a publisher.	Track7 Games	
They	Following the announcement of the horror first person shooter They in 2007, developer Metropolis Software was acquired by CD Projekt, which moved the team off of They in favor of working on The Witcher, with They ultimately going unreleased.	Metropolis Software	
This Is Vegas	An open world video game centered around the activities in Las Vegas. Announced in 2008, it was cancelled in 2010 after Midway Games went bankrupt and their assets were acquired by Warner Bros. Interactive Entertainment. No official reason was given, but the game's budget up to that point was already at US$50 million, a massive amount for a game at that time.	Surreal Software	Midway Games/Warner Bros.
TimeO	TimeO was an action game following two New Yorkers trapped in a parallel shadow version of the city. The game was built using work originally done for a Ghostbusters prototype, which had been cancelled due to ZootFly not acquiring the license. Following the game's initial announcement, little news on the game surfaced over the following year, with the game itself ultimately never materializing	ZootFly	
To End All Wars	A first person shooter set during World War I was announced in 2007, but never materialized.	Kuju Entertainment	
Tom Clancy's Rainbow 6: Patriots	A new entry in the Tom Clancy's Rainbow Six series was announced in 2011 for Xbox 360, PlayStation 3, and PC via a trailer with pre-rendered target footage. In 2013, it was announced that the game had shifted to the next generation of consoles, though the project experienced several issues in the transition and needed to be rebooted. By 2014, it had been confirmed that Patriots had been cancelled and that the series would be rebooted with Tom Clancy's Rainbow Six: Siege (2015).	Ubisoft	Ubisoft
Voltage	The racing game Voltage was scheduled for release on PlayStation 3, Xbox 360, and PC in 2008, but never materialized.	IBA	
The Wall	The Wall, a shooter set in a dystopian future, was first announced in 2006 for PlayStation 3 and Xbox 360, but failed to materialize.	World Forge / Burut CT	
WarDevil / Project Kane	Originally announced as WarDevil in 2004 for the PlayStation 3, an Xbox 360 version was later announced as well. The game was planned to be similar in concept to the Dynasty Warriors by Digi-Guys, a newly created developer subsidiary by publisher Ignition Entertainment. The game went through a lengthy and difficult 7 year development period, including a brief rebrand/reworking of the game as Project Kane to salvage work done on it, but it was ultimately cancelled, with Ignition going out of business shortly afterwards.	Digi-Guys	Ignition Entertainment
The Witcher: Rise of the White Wolf	A port of The Witcher (2007) was announced for PlayStation 3 and Xbox 360 in 2008, and would feature various enhancements compared to the PC original. In 2009, developer Widescreen games announced they had put the project on hold due to payments from publisher CD Projekt being late. CD Project responded that the late payments had been due to Widescreen missing deadlines and the port's lackluster quality, and that they had terminated their relationship.	Widescreen Games	CD Projekt
World in Conflict: Soviet Assault	Following the release World of Conflict (2007) on PC, the Soviet Assault expansion pack was announced, along with standalone ports for PlayStation 3 and Xbox 360. The project was cancelled following the merger of Activision and Vivendi Universal, only for Ubisoft to acquire the rights to the franchise. While the PC expansion was released in 2009, Ubisoft decided not to release the console ports.	Massive Entertainment	Ubisoft
WWE Brawl	A new WWE wrestling game, WWE Brawl, was announced in 2011 for release on Xbox 360, PlayStation 3, and Wii. Unlike THQ's annual WWE releases, Brawl was a spin-off intended to be a more fast paced party fighting game akin to Super Smash Bros. or Power Stone. However, the game was never released, presumably due to THQ's financial difficulties at the time. In 2024, a prototype of a previously-unknown Nintendo 3DS version was found and shared online.	THQ	THQ
Zombies!!!	A video game adaptation of the board game Zombies!!! was announced in 2008 for digital release on Xbox 360 and PS3. However, publisher Twilight Creations later announced the next year that Big Rooster would no longer be working on the game and that they were seeking a new developer. The game was ultimately released only on Windows Phone in 2011, developed by Babaroga.	Big Rooster	Twilight Creations Inc.
Zoombies: Animales de la Muerte	First announced exclusively for WiiWare in 2008, this version was cancelled in 2011 when the developers failed to keep the game within the WiiWare size limits. While PlayStation 3 and Xbox 360 versions were announced as replacements, those too were cancelled, and the game only saw release for iOS mobile devices in 2013.	High Voltage Software	MTV Games
