= 8 Days =

8 Days or Eight Days may refer to:

- 8 Days (magazine), a Singaporean weekly
- 8 Days, a CD given away with the album Variations on a Dream by The Pineapple Thief
- Eight Days, an unreleased video game for the PlayStation 3
- Eight Days, Assassination Attempts against King Jeongjo, a 2007 South Korean TV series
- "Eight Days", a song by Pitchshifter from PSI
- Eight Days: A Story of Haiti, a picture book by Edwidge Danticat
- 8 Days, A 2015 suspense movie
- 8 Days, A 2019 German miniseries

== See also ==
- Eight Days a Week (disambiguation)
- Hanukkah, a celebration surrounding 8 days of candles
