= White Council (disambiguation) =

The White Council is a group of Eldar Lords and Wizards in J. R. R. Tolkien's Middle-earth.

White Council may also refer to:

- The Lord of the Rings: The White Council, an unreleased role-playing video game
- White Citizens' Council, an American white supremacist organization
- The White Council, the governing body of the Wizard community in The Dresden Files
