= Rat race (disambiguation) =

A rat race is an endless, self-defeating pursuit.

Rat race may also refer to:

== Film and television ==
- The Rat Race, a 1960 film directed by Robert Mulligan starring Tony Curtis and Debbie Reynolds
- Rat Race (film), a 2001 comedy film directed by Jerry Zucker
- Rat Race, a 2011 Indian documentary film by Miriam Chandy Menacherry
- "Rat Race" (Elementary), a 2012 television episode
- Rat Race (The Price Is Right), a pricing game on the TV show The Price Is Right

== Music ==
- Rat Race (album), by Child's Play, 1990
- The Rat Race Blues a 1960 jazz album by Gigi Gryce
- "Rat Race" (The Specials song), 1980
- "Rat Race" (Enter Shikari song), 2013
- "Rat Race", a song by Bob Marley & The Wailers from Rastaman Vibration, 1976
- "Rat Race", a song by Moka Only from I'm Delighted, 2016
- "Rat Race", a song by Skindred from Roots Rock Riot, 2007
- "Rat Race", a song by the UK Subs, from Brand New Age, 1980
- "Rat Race", a song by The Drifters
- "Rat Race", a song by Baha Men

== Other uses ==
- Rat Race (video game), a cancelled Sony game
- Ratrace (game), a board game published in 1967
- The Rat Race (novel), a 1950 science fiction novel by Jay Franklin
- Who He? a 1953 novel by Alfred Bester also published as The Rat Race
- Rat-race coupler, a type of radio-frequency coupler
