= The Agency: Covert Ops =

Cancelled video game

The Agency
- Developer: SOE Seattle
- Publisher: Sony Online Entertainment
- Engine: Unreal Engine 3
- Platforms: PlayStation 3, Microsoft Windows
- Release: Cancelled
- Genres: MMO shooter, stealth
- Mode: Multiplayer

The Agency was a cancelled spy-themed MMO shooter video game developed by Sony Online Entertainment studios in Seattle for Microsoft Windows and PlayStation 3. On March 31, 2011, production was discontinued after the closure of SOE's Seattle studio.

== Gameplay ==
In-game screenshot of The Agency

The game was to feature first-person shooter-style gun fighting, with the ability to switch between third and first person views, with some driving and other vehicular segments as well. Skill would be the primary determining factor in the success of the player, though some role-playing video game elements would come into play as well. It has been mentioned that one shot to the head would instantly kill any player, suggesting it would be a somewhat realistic shooter. The game would also include relevant subgames and minigames, among them casino games such as Texas hold 'em, which could be played for fun or could be used to initiate instance missions, such as losing or winning enough games to draw the attention of an NPC.

Upon starting the game the player would have the opportunity to join one of two agencies, which would determine the style of missions they would receive during gameplay.

- The United Network of Intelligence and Tactical Experts (U.N.I.T.E) are the world's most elite secret agents. They are the forefront of the fight against terrorism, corruption, and rogue states around the globe. U.N.I.T.E. agents are deadly specialists in stealth and subterfuge, with access to technology the public has never seen before.
- The Paramilitary Global Operations Network (ParaGON) is one of the largest private armies in the world, serving clients both upstanding and unsavory. ParaGON's efficient, honorable, and often unconventional mercenaries can be found putting duct tape and high explosives to new and exciting uses on every continent.

There was little released on the storyline, although it was hinted that there would be one that ties together all of the agencies within the game.

In an interview on All Games Interactive, the developers stated that the title would be primarily a shooter where a headshot is still a headshot, but other enhancements would be unlocked by the player depending on what they accomplish in the game. However, unlike other titles in which low level players have little to no chance in finishing off a high level veteran, it is possible to do so in the game. Although the high level player would take out many of the low level players in the example, they would "look cool" while doing so based on the skills and options that they have purchased in developing their character, but would eventually die. PvP would also be introduced as an option for players, not as a requirement for play. The user interface would be streamlined in comparison to most massively multiplayer online games, operating more like that of a shooter game to increase ease of interaction in the environment and streamline the combat and inventory processes.

Players would also be able to switch roles depending on what gear their avatar decides to wear. Players inclined to pursue an assault class will simply need to wear assault-type equipment, stealth players will wear stealthy equipment, and so on, negating the need to create a new character type every time they wish to experiment with a different play style. The amount of gear and costumes that each player will have access to will grow as they accomplish tasks within the game, allowing for more options. There will also be a firing range-type environment available for players to test weapons and gadgets.

The world is not a seamless environment encompassing the globe. The environment of the game is being developed around a hub and spoke system where public areas can branch off into other public zones or private areas. Players would be able to encounter other players in public areas who can join them as part of a team to help complete objectives for an assigned mission. Most of the title would be focused on player missions that can be tackled solo or with up to three other members as a team during a mission. This number can increase to eight players during what have been called "crossover" missions, up to thirty two players in any area during PvP battles. Players will also be able to walk to destinations close to them, but will be able to take trains, planes, or other means of transportation to get to far off locations such as other cities or areas.

Ground, water, and air challenges with vehicles were also being planned to be part of the title. Mission types would include assault, patrol, delivery, cross-over objectives, assassination, and others inspired by many sources such as spy films. Mini-games such as casino style gambling would also be present. Missions would be divided into "short" missions that would take 10–15 minutes to complete, "medium-length" missions of approximately 30–60 minutes, and "set pieces" that would sometimes take well over an hour to complete.

The concept of Operatives was meant to be a key feature in The Agency: Covert Ops. Players would complete missions to acquire new Operatives. Different types of Operatives would supply the player with anything from in-mission hints to advanced vehicles. Operatives can also initiate instance missions, by calling for help when they are in trouble. Better players would be rewarded with access to the better Operatives to add to their teams, making those players even stronger. Operatives will be stylistically represented as trading cards, which can be sold, auctioned, traded and given to friends and other players.

Once players have achieved a certain level of prestige in the game they would be able to create or join "networks" with other players. In terms of functionality, networks are similar to guilds in other MMOs. Networks in The Agency: Covert Ops would have access to special network missions that would pit rival player teams against each other in a competition to complete a common objective first. In an interview with AGI, the developers have stated that those clan-like groupings would also be called 'joint agencies'.

The Black Market would have allowed players to browse through collections of high-tech weapons, surveillance equipment, and home decor.

== Development ==
The developers stated in an interview with All Games Interactive that 30 frames-per-second was their minimum target frame rate. They also stated that they would attempt to develop the title in order to use all of the available resolution capabilities present in the PS3. Voice communication was also a feature to be used in the title and the PS3 hard drive would feature heavily in their ability to deliver content to the player.

On March 31, 2011, Sony Online Entertainment announced that it was closing its Seattle, Tucson, and Denver studios, and cancelling the release of the game as a result.

=== Facebook application ===
The Agency: Covert Ops had its own Facebook application, which was launched in May 2010. It included missions, mini-games and the ability to share achievements with Facebook friends. The game was taken offline shortly after The Agency: Covert Ops's cancellation.
