= Eight Days a Week (disambiguation) =

"Eight Days a Week" is a song by The Beatles.

Eight Days a Week may also refer to:

- The Beatles: Eight Days a Week, a 2016 documentary about the touring days of the Beatles by Ron Howard
- Eight Days a Week (film), a 1997 comedy film by Michael Davis
- Eight Days a Week, a 1980s UK music discussion TV programme presented by Robin Denselow
- Eight Days a Week, an unaired American TV series starring Christina Milian
- "Eight Days a Week", a 1993–1994 column for the New York Observer by Larry Doyle
