= Snapshot (video game) =

2012 video game

- Developers: Retro Affect, Kyle Pulver, Dave Carrigg
- Composer: Wil Whitlark
- Platforms: Windows, Mac OS X, Linux
- Release: WW: 30 August 2012
- Genre: Platform
- Mode: Single-player

Snapshot is a platform game developed by Retro Affect and released on 30 August 2012 for Microsoft Windows and Mac OS X.

== Gameplay ==
The player controls a character with fairly standard 2-D controls: left, right, duck, and jump. The player also controls a camera viewfinder, the Snapshot of the title, with the mouse. When a snapshot is taken of an in-game object, it disappears from the gameworld and is stored on the camera; the stored images can then be pasted into new parts of the gameworld to overcome an obstacle. The objects and elements that can be captured have a wide range of different properties or utilities, such as elephants that serve as walking springboards or gusts of wind that can push the player across long gaps.

In addition to completing the individual levels, there are also awards given for collecting all stars in a level, beating time challenges and taking snapshots of specific items in a level and retaining them until the level is exited.

== Development ==
Snapshot was created and the second project by a Tempe, Arizona-based developer Kyle Pulver who developed the game together with Peter Jones and Dave Carrigg of Retro Affect. Versions for the PlayStation Vita and PlayStation 3 were announced, but never materialized.

== Reception ==
The game was favorably received by the critics. It holds a score of 74/100 on Metacritic review score aggregator.
