= The Dark Eye: Demonicon =

2013 video game

- Developer: Noumena Studios
- Publisher: Kalypso Media
- Series: The Dark Eye
- Engine: Vision
- Platform: Microsoft Windows
- Release: WW: 25 October 2013
- Genre: Action role-playing
- Mode: Single-player

The Dark Eye: Demonicon (German: Das Schwarze Auge: Demonicon) is a 2013 action role-playing game developed by Noumena Studios and published by Kalypso Media for Microsoft Windows. It features the original ruleset and game world of The Dark Eye series.

== Development ==
It was originally developed by Silver Style Studio for the publisher TGC. However, TGC went into administration in summer 2010 and publisher Kalypso Media bought the IP and took over 17 developers of the Silver Style Studio and founded the third inhouse Kalypso development studio named Noumena Studios. The team now has 45-50 developers (Source Kalypso Media) and the game was released in 2013. The game was originally in development for Xbox 360 and PlayStation 3 as well, but after the release of PC version, no news of console ports were announced.

== Setting ==
Two decades before the story began, Borbarad, a powerful evil mage, swept eastern Aventuria with undead and corruption. Borbarad fell during battle and his Demon Crown, the symbol of his rule, shattered. The so-called Shadow Lands arose from his dominion. Various warlords fought for the Shadowlands until warriors of the goddess Rondra rid the city of Warunk of necromancers.

"Father", Fergolosh and Parel formed a mercenary team together, the Cloverleaf. However, father left because of Azaril, the High Prophetess of Borbarad Church. Azaril wanted to create a powerful being and bring it under her control. To do this, she needed the help of a demon, Zhulgaroth. However, the demon demanded something in return. Azaril was to offer the demon seven newborns, the so-called Awakened, to whom Zhulgaroth would bestow powerful powers, the so-called "Gifts". After awakening the gifts of the awakened, they will be compelled to kill one another; all gifts will be focused on one person who will be the first paladin, this should able Azaril to control the paladin. Zhulgaroth should get the remaining six souls in return.

Azaril chose seven virgins and two men to beget these children. Father was one of these men, he sired three of them, the other named Seghal sired the remaining four. At the ceremony, all seven were born at the same time and Zhulgaroth bestowed the gifts on them. However, father stole two babies at the ceremony, one of which was his own son, Cairon, and the second baby was a daughter of Seghal, Calandra. In addition, he took Cairon's mother with him. Azaril was too weakened by the demon's summoning to stop them. Azaril had to create seven seals of protection from Zhulgaroth to protect herself from the demon's warth.

Father raised the two children and did everything in his power to hide them from Azaril an borboradians. He also tried to prevent the gifts from awakening. This happens either when two Awakened blood mixes or they engage in intercourse. Both children grew up without knowledge of their origins or their powers. Father, along with Cairon and Calandra, who are now adults, arrive in the city of Warunk as refugees. What happened to Cairon's mother is not properly explained but she died shortly after escaping with father. A plague is raging in the refugee camp, killing many people. The Warunkers cordon off the city to prevent the plague from spreading. The three are stuck in the refugee camp when Falk, a powerful Rondrian, wants to marry Calandra and give them citizenship.

== Plot ==
Calandra notices at night that people are always being kidnapped by someone in the Moloch Mountain. Calandra decides to follow the man and free the kidnapped. However, she does not tell this to her father or Cairon. When the two notice that she has disappeared and they are informed that she has descended into the Moloch Mountain, they fear that she is trying to avoid marrying Falk. Father, who recently lost a leg, cannot follow her, so Cairon descends the Moloch mountain alone. He finds Calandra, but both are injured in a fight. They bandage each other's wounds, which Father has always strictly forbidden, and their blood mixes. The gifts awaken and both can cast magic from now on. They eventually fight their way to the kidnapper, who turns out to be a cannibal and is in the process of eating a kidnapped man. Cairon defeats the cannibal. The player has the choice to kill him or let him go. If he is killed, the remaining prisoners die, as the prison can no longer be opened due to a magic seal. If he is allowed to leave, he will release the captives and disappear.

Cairon and Calandra return to the refugee camp. They both have feelings for each other and Calandra asks Cairon to stop the wedding. Falk appears at the refugee camp and Cairon insists in front of him that the wedding be called off. Falk then says that Cairon should let off steam in the city and gives him a permit with which he can enter the city at least temporarily. Cairon searches for a way to gain citizenship for himself and his family without Calandra having to marry Falk. Fergolosh, the captain of the city guard, and Parel, leader of a gang of smugglers, can make this possible for him. However, both want Cairon to persuade a brothel in which a necromancer is up to no good to submit to the control of either the City Guard or the Cartel. Cairon finds the necromancer in the brothel and kills him. The owner wants Cairon to decide who to join. Both options have pros and cons for the city.

As a result, Cairon and his family received the citizenship of Fergolosh or Parel. Both ask Cairon to accept another assignment. A mage should place himself in the care of either the city guard or the cartel. Both sides want to prevent the other from exploiting the magician's knowledge. After deciding who to entrust the mage to, either the cartel will attack the Guards Armory or Cairon will attack it himself. After completing this task, a summoner will attack the refugee camp and turn almost everyone into undead. The summoner wants to summon a creature to attack the city. Cairon seems to stop him at first and the summoner disappears.

Little by little, Cairon find out during the tasks that are given to him that Falk wants to overthrow the head of the Rondrians and take his place. To do this, the summoner should summon a powerful demon, which Falk would have killed. The demon is summoned, but Falk arrives too late and Cairon kills the demon. So that Falk doesn't look completely inglorious, he arrests the conjurer. Falk then wants the wedding between him and Calandra to take place immediately. Cairon confronts Falk in the church and prevents the wedding. Falk's mysterious mother turns out to be Azaril, who wants to awaken Falk's gift by marrying and sleeping with Calandra. Trusting that Falk will kill Cairon soon, Azaril makes a pact with Calandra that if she goes with her, nothing will happen to Cairon and father. Calandra agrees despite Cairon's protests. Azaril and Calandra leave town while Cairon and Father are imprisoned. Cairon breaks out of prison and kills Falk in single combat. Falk's gift then passes to Cairon, making him stronger.

Cairon picks up the trail of Calandra and Azaril and heads to Talonmoor. An alleged healer led a group of sick people from the refugee camp to Talonmoor shortly before the undead rampaged in Warunk. In the town of Farnfeld in Talonmoor he gets the information that this healer whose name is Ghamat talked to Azaril and Calandra. Cairon finds out that instead of being cured of the plague as promised, the sick are thrown into a pit and there, according to Farnfeld residents, they die and find their salvation. However, the bodies fall into a tunnel and come out not far from town, undead. Ghamat forces her to search an ancient race's dig site for an artifact that promises a cure for the plague, but not for those who have already turned undead. Cairon eventually kills Ghamat and his power passes to him. He then has the option of continuing the excavations and not giving up the search for this artefact, or He can tell the residents of Ghamat's deeds.

Cairon return to Warunk where Cassio, Cairon's birth sister, who is also an Awakened, awaits him. Together with Cairon, she would like to abolish the obligation to kill. To do this, she wants to summon Zhulgaroth and force him to break it up. To do this, some ingredients must be obtained and someone related by blood to the summoner must willingly sacrifice themselves for the summoning. After Azaril shows up and captures Father, Cassio begins fighting Cairon. When Cairon mortally wounds Cassio, Azaril leaves Warunk with Father. With the last of her strength, she reveals to him that after Azaril captured father, she is the only blood relative left to sacrifice herself, and that's why she started the fight. Had she won, she hoped Cairon would have had the same will. Cassio dies shortly after.

Zhulgaroth tells Cairon of the seven seals that must be broken to end the compulsion to kill. These are in the monastery where he was born. Zhulgaroth takes him to the monastery through a portal. There, Cairon meets Calandra, who became Azaril's apprentice, killed the last two Awakened in the process, learned from her but secretly worked against her. Calandra wants to start a new church and get rid of Azaril. Cairon meets Seghal Monastery, who helps him to free father in the monastery. He and his father finally tell him the complete story of his origins, birth and gifts. When all seven gifts have passed to an Awakened, the "First Paladin" is born, which is said to be in bondage to Azaril, unless one breaks the seven seals,

Calandra wants Cairon to determine the church's new sacraments, such as whether marriage should be allowed. After choosing all the sacraments and destroying six of the seven seals, he encounters Azaril. She herself guards the final seal. Cairon defeat her in single combat and has the option of killing or sparing her. Calandra's gift is the ability to create portals, with which a demon can also get from the sphere of demons into the sphere in which the inhabitants of Dere are located. Calandra opens a gate to Zhulgaroth's Sphere in Moloch Mountain to destroy him. However, Cairon recognizes that Zhulgaroth had planned this from the beginning in order to travel into Dere and destroy everything there.

Only the First Paladin has the power to prevent him from transgressing the spheres. The player now has the option to sacrifice either Calandra or Cairon. One of them transfers its gifts to the other, who then becomes the first paladin, who throws themselves against Zhulgaroth and prevents him from traveling through the spheres. The paladin, and thus the chosen person dies. The other person leaves the Molchen Mountain unharmed. Later material released for The Dark Eye series reveal that canonically it was Cairon who made the sacrifice.

== Gameplay ==
In Demonicon, the player controls their character directly from a third-person perspective . It is not possible to choose a specific class such as mage, warrior or similar. Instead, they are free to choose all skills, which they can develop according to their own ideas in battles and missions, as is usual in role-playing games, by collecting a kind of experience points, called adventure points and gift points in the game. With adventure points the player can increase Cairon's attributes, talents and weapon skills. With gift points his spells. level upsas usual in other role-playing games, where the player could distribute their points. By default, quests and quest chains can be solved in very different ways. Applying Cairon's talents, such as persuasion, will result in additional walkthroughs or endings in quests. The rewards vary depending on the walkthrough.

=== Skills ===
==== Attributes ====
There are five attributes that can be increased with Adventure Points, or AP for short. These attributes each have two sub-attributes. If the player increases the main attribute, they increase the two sub-attributes at the same time. However, increasing only one sub-attribute does not change the other sub-attribute.

- Physical Strength: Determines the amount of the damage bonus and the attack value
- Agility: Determines parry value and chance to land critical hits.
- Constitution: Determines resistance to wounds, poisoning, burns and life energy
- Courage: Determines stamina, the amount of regeneration of stamina and essence
- Will : Determines Attack and Parry values

In addition, life energy, endurance and essence can be increased separately.

==== Talents ====
There are four talents in total, each with two sub-talents that increase in the same way as the attributes.

- Wisdom: Affects Tales and Legends and Herblore. With sagas and legends, special information about the game world can be obtained or new conversation options can be unlocked. Herblore can be used to collect rare plants needed to brew potions.
- Intuition: Affects Acuity and Healing. With the sensory acuity, traps could be discovered and hiding places tracked down. Heal increases the effects of potions and life regeneration. Likewise, NPCs that are intended for it can be healed.
- Charisma: Affects persuasion and bargaining. Other conversation options or quest progressions can be unlocked with persuasion. With haggling, traders lower their prices and buy the player's goods at higher ones.
- Sleight of Hand: Affects Lockpicking and Blacksmithing. Chests can be opened with lock picking. Blacksmith can disarm traps and operate gates and levers.

Each sub-talent can be boosted by equipment.

==== Weapon skills ====
Weapon skills can be used to perform special maneuvers that consume stamina. There are four weapon skill trees in total, some of which are intertwined: bladed weapons, slashing weapons, parrying, and dodging. Each maneuver also offers two optimization variants, both of which can be selected, for example that a maneuver consumes less stamina and also causes more damage.

==== Spells ====
The player has the opportunity to choose new spells from four spell trees by awarding gift points. However, these are not branched like some weapon skills. However, like weapon skills, each spell has two tweak variants, both of which can be chosen. The Spell Trees consist of Ice Spells, Fire Spells, Disease Spells, and Demonic Aura Spells.

== Reception ==
Reception

Aggregate score
Aggregator	Score
Metacritic	61/100

The game received mostly mediocre reviews at release, scoring 61 out of 100 on Metacritic, based on 12 reviews.
