= Cipher Complex =

- Developer: Edge of Reality
- Publisher: Sega
- Composer: Front 242
- Platforms: Microsoft Windows, PlayStation 3, Xbox 360
- Release: Cancelled
- Genres: Stealth, action
- Modes: Single-player, multiplayer

Cipher Complex is a cancelled stealth action video game that was being developed for the Microsoft Windows, PlayStation 3 and Xbox 360 systems by Edge of Reality.

== Development ==
The game was first announced in June 2006, by which time it was reported to already have been in production and self-funded for two years; the title was then signed with Sega in 2007, but in July 2009 it was reported to be cancelled.

== Gameplay ==
Edge of Reality was hoping to "revolutionize" the stealth action genre.

In June 2010, gameplay footage of a level from Cipher Complex was leaked online via Dailymotion, depicting the player character (Cipher) infiltrating a steel mill in China, under orders to extract a General who is being held hostage; in addition, short clips of gameplay can be seen on Edge of Reality's official homepage. An "in-game screenshot" of the steel mill level, as well as some concept art, textures and logos from the game have also been posted to Picasa by the lead environment artist, who has since clarified that it is a demo level. Part of an early cinematic as well as some character animations were again posted via Dailymotion in March 2011. Gameplay from an unreleased demo and testing environment was published by the Hard4Games channel on YouTube in April 2018.

== Plot ==
The official storyline, as quoted from the game's original press release, is as follows:

U.S. surveillance satellites detect activity onboard the decommissioned Soviet Bargration Missile Defense Station 4 off the east coast of Siberia. When the Russians deny the U.S. access to the facility, Department of Defense strategists suggest that a small, plausibly deniable reconnaissance mission be sent in to investigate. The Defense Threat Reduction Agency is given the go-ahead for operation BLACKOUT, the insertion of a single expert Operator on Russian WMDs and launch facilities. Lt. Col. John Sullivan, callsign: Cipher is air dropped in, and what was supposed to be primarily a reconnaissance mission becomes a race against a terrorist threat; one with implications that will shake the foundations of American democracy and freedoms.
