= ZootFly =

Slovenian video game developer

- Type: Defunct (acquisition)
- Industry: Video games
- Founded: Ljubljana, Slovenia (2002)
- Headquarters: Ljubljana, Slovenia
- Key people: Boštjan Troha, Founder/CEO; Denis Rožaj, Founder/COO; Tibor Klajnscek, Technical Director
- Number of employees: 65 on-site + 150-off site

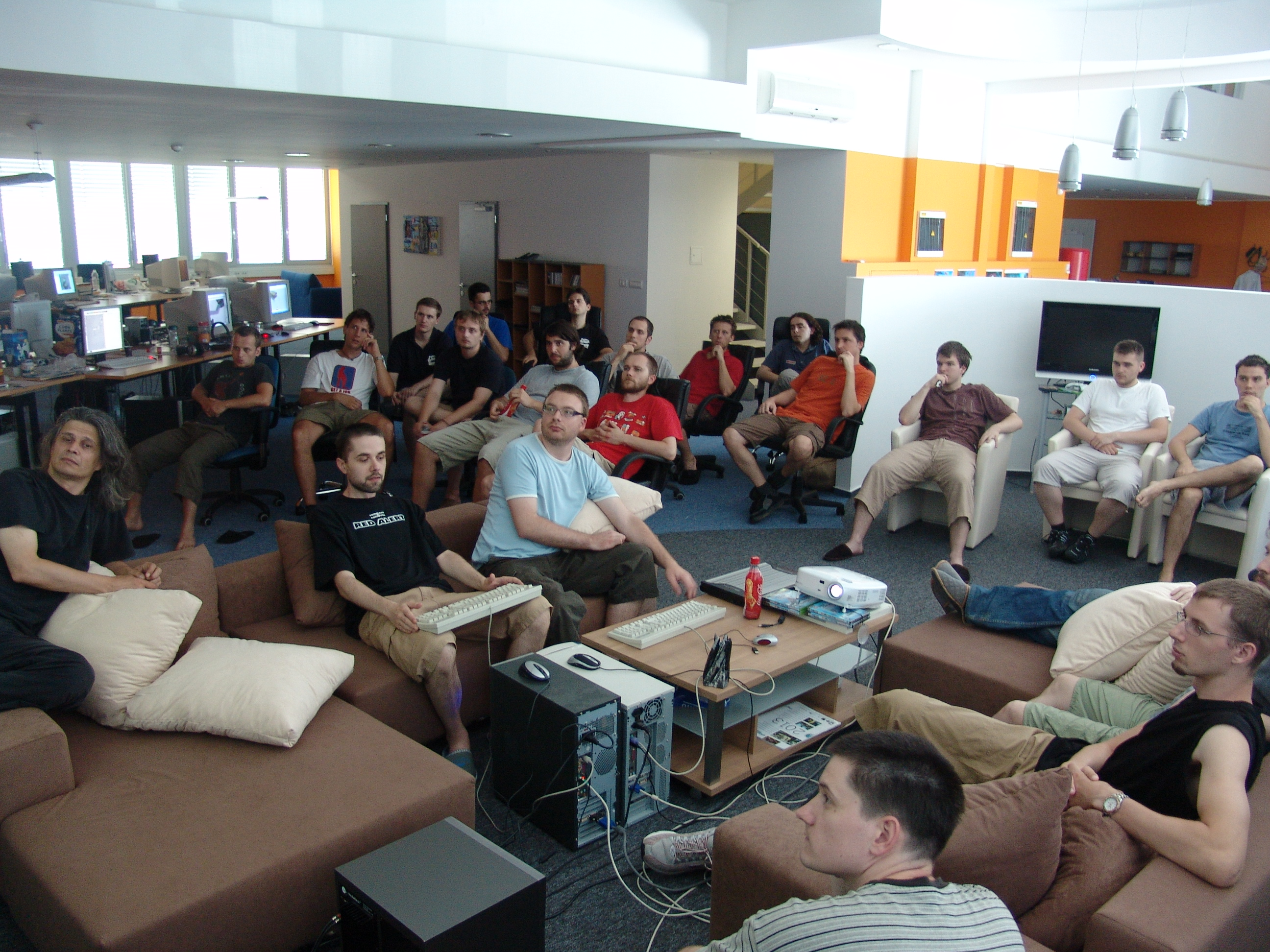
A brainstorming session of the ZootFly core team in 2005.

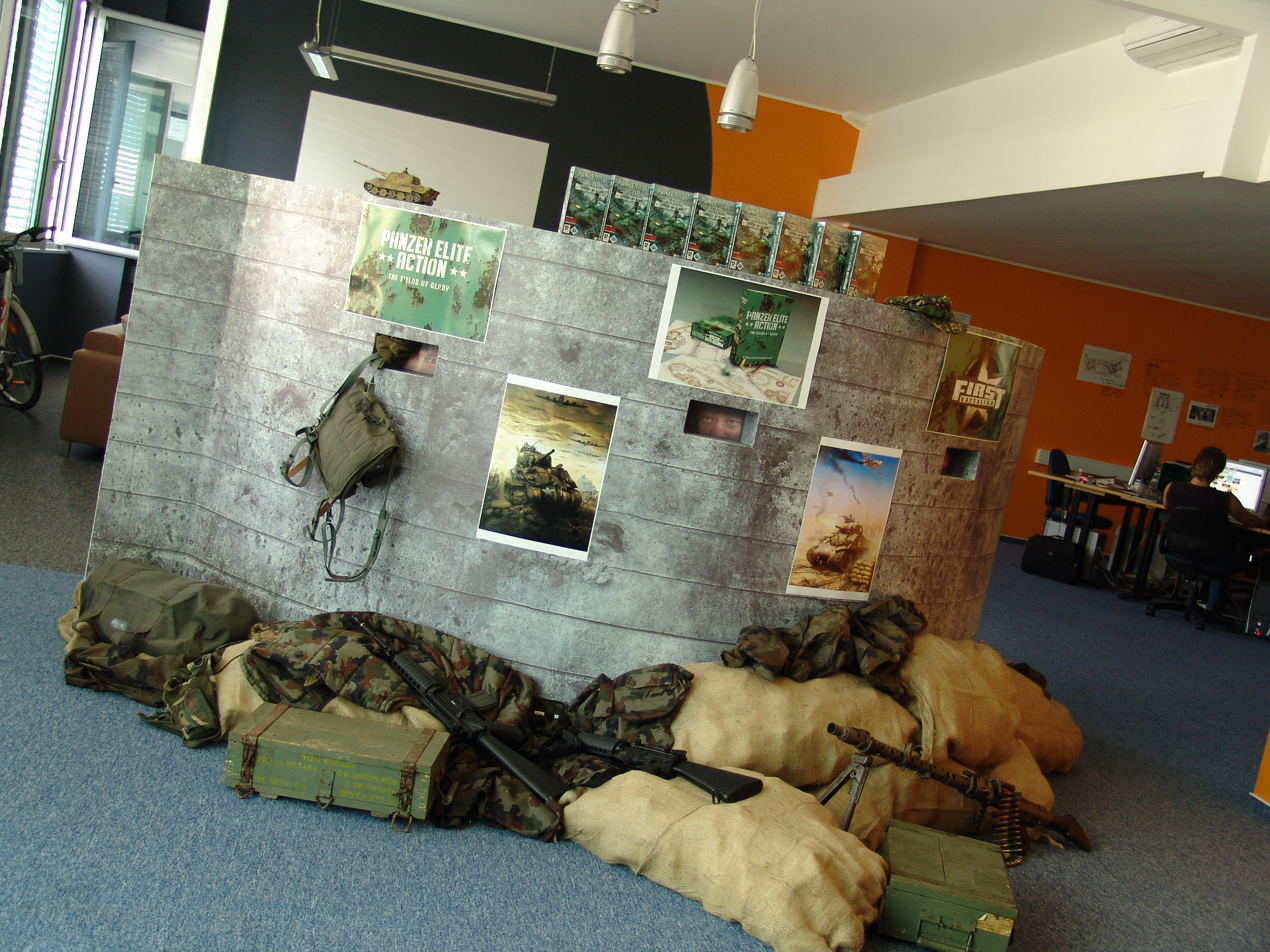
This WW2 pillbox at the ZootFly HQ is a tribute to Panzer Elite Action.

ZootFly was a Slovenian video game developer specializing in the development of action adventure games for the Xbox, Xbox 360, PS3 and PC. ZootFly was a member studio of the International Game Developers Association (IGDA).

The studio's most successful game was Marlow Briggs and the Mask of Death which made $45 million in revenue and has a score of 91% on Steam.

ZootFly was acquired in 2013 by a casino equipment manufacturer Interblock.

ZootFly headquarters in Ljubljana

== History ==
ZootFly was founded in December 2002 in Ljubljana, Slovenia by industry veterans Boštjan Troha, Denis Rožaj and David Pangerl.

In 2003 Horizonte, an independent Central European venture capital firm (founded in 1985) bought 40% of the company.

In 2013 ZootFly was acquired by millionaire Joc Pečečnik who merged the studio with Interblock, one of the leading makers of luxury casino and gaming products, for an undisclosed sum. The studio kickstarted the development of casino entertainment products with advanced technologies, such as holographic imaging, virtual reality and facial and emotional recognition utilizing ZootFly's earlier research on psychometrics.

== Research ==
ZootFly experimented extensively with the possibilities of reading and interpreting players' inputs and adapting the gameplay experience accordingly based on specific psychological profiles extrapolated via psychometrics. According to ZootFly, users' inputs reveal comprehensive information about them—reactions in tight situations, how they use resources, how they interact and communicate, how they deal with challenges, keypress sequences, mouse movement jerkiness, actions performed when entering a new space: i.e. whether they go in the middle of the room and look around or explore details first, the average speed of their movements, etc. Zoofly researched building psychological profiles of players using their inputs and adapting the game accordingly. For example, a game could have three distinctively different conclusions and the psychometrics engine would pick the right one for the player. The goal was to avoid unwanted endings, as the game would hopefully have enough feedback to deliver what the player wanted. The immediate reactions of the game would work on positive feedback. If the player were cerebral, they would receive more cerebral challenges; if violent, more violence. Immediate responses could improve the usability/learning curves as well. For example, if the player were to quick-save often, the game might be too difficult, and if they were to not discover many rooms in a time period, they might be lost and need additional stimuli to proceed. If they were too fast and the game was not fun any-more, they might require more interesting obstacles.

A psychometrics engine would change gameplay subtly to provide entertainment without frustration, automatically tailored to the specific player. Additionally, ZootFly experimented with mood changes induced by infra-sound. They employed barely audible sound (low frequency) effects to invoke deep and subconscious feelings. For example, when the engine interpreted a player as passive, the aural stimuli would make them more aggressive.

== Video games ==
=== Hollow ===
ZootFly's first game, never published, was Hollow. In it, players would assume the role of an expelled US journalist named Tyler Kilmore, who, upon returning to the disco-totalitarian state of Centrope reunites with his fiancée and finds himself being arrested for her murder. The game would feature four distinct environments, ranging from a disco-totalitarian metropolis to a decaying underworld. Each mission in the game would end with a movie-style action sequence showing the player's best moments.

=== Panzer Elite Action: Fields of Glory ===
Developed for PC and the Xbox for JoWood Productions, Panzer Elite Action follows the story of three tank commanders and their crew. The German commander, encouraged by easy successes in Poland and France, moves on to the Eastern Front and the brink of victory with the taking of Stalingrad. Players meet the Russian commander in desperate straits as he helps defend Stalingrad, and follow him as the tide turns against the Germans and he joins the massive battle of Kursk. The American commander enters the war at the Normandy Beachhead on D-Day. After the struggle for the Bocage, he defends against the German outbreak at the Battle of the Bulge, and then drives on to the victorious crossing of the Rhine.

=== First Battalion ===
First Battalion is a North American version of Panzer Elite Action: Fields of Glory. The game was published by DreamCatcher Interactive.

=== Panzer Elite Action: Dunes of War ===
An extension of the original Panzer Elite Action, Panzer Elite Action: Dunes of War follows the story of two tank commanders and their crews through their harrowing North Africa battle campaigns. The German commander, called in to help the Italian army, moves from the European theatre to the dunes of Sahara, while the American commander enters the war on the African beaches of the Mediterranean.

=== Toy Wars ===
Announced on 19 January 2007, Toy Wars is a small downloadable game in the early prototype stages as of 2007, for Windows, XBLA, and EDI.

=== Prison Break: The Conspiracy ===
Prison Break: The Conspiracy is an action-adventure video game based on the first season of the Fox Network television series Prison Break, released for Microsoft Windows, Xbox 360 and PlayStation 3.

The release had been set for 19 March 2010 in Germany and 26 March 2010 in the United Kingdom and Europe, and 30 March 2010 in North America. The game had been in development for PlayStation 3, Xbox 360 and PC for release in February 2009, but was canceled when Brash Entertainment closed down. However, ZootFly continued the development and self-funded the project for 13 months. Once the game was polished and nearly finished, it was picked up by publisher Deep Silver.

=== The Expendables 2 Videogame ===
Game made by ZootFly studio in short time for Ubisoft. Released in August 2012. Metacritics ranking on Xbox 360 version is 32.

=== Narco Terror ===
A top-down shoot 'em up video game released for Windows, Xbox 360 and PlayStation 3, borrowing gameplay elements from The Expendables 2 video game. The team was able to correct past issues from their prior work to improve upon for Narco Terror. Released in July 2013. (Ref. that this game really exists and is theirs http://zootfly.com/?game=narco-terror; steam page https://web.archive.org/web/20141220195633/http://store.steampowered.com/app/225180/)

=== Marlow Briggs and the Mask of Death ===
Marlow Briggs and the Mask of Death is an action-adventure video game (co-developed with Microsoft Studios) published by 505 Games and released on 20 September 2013. It is available for Microsoft Windows and Xbox Live Arcade download for Xbox 360. The game is inspired by blockbuster action films and features a main character who is bound to an ancient Mayan Death Mask "who's had no-one to talk to for 2000 years".

Marlow Briggs and the Mask of Death grossed $45 million worldwide on a $5 million budget.

=== Past development ===
In January 2007 ZootFly placed several trailers on YouTube showing an early playable version of a game based on the Ghostbusters franchise for the Xbox 360. Soon after it became clear that ZootFly had not secured the license to make such a game and that the development team had already been shifted to work on TimeO, a title with many similarities. Even the game footage trailers posted to YouTube were removed after Sony Pictures Entertainment requested their deletion because of their unlicensed nature. While ZootFly's title had died early in development, it helped spur interest in a game based on the Ghostbusters franchise and a licensed game, already under development at Terminal Reality, was bolstered by ZootFly's failed title. Mark Randel, co-founder and head of Terminal Reality, was interviewed by Official Xbox Magazine and in that interview stated that "What Zootfly did for us, inadvertently, is help sell the concept. When their footage came out, we were close to our green-light meeting, and when the executives saw the reaction from the fans, they immediately knew, 'Hey, Ghostbusters is going to be a big hit – we need to put this game into production.'"

TimeO, another title developed by the same team as ZootFly's Ghostbusters game, dropped off the radar for several years. First announced soon after the Ghostbusters prototype, it went months with little in the way of press coverage after the first flurries of activity related to its announcement. The original official web site (www.timeogame.com) went over a year without being updated before disappearing completely. Later, a few video game news originations released articles in May 2008 disclosing that Brash Entertainment was the publisher of the title, but Brash Entertainment has since shut down operations. Assumed to be without a publisher and stuck in development hell TimeO later reappeared on ZootFly's main website with a new trailer and fresh screen shots but no information on its potential release date or publisher. Although the website doesn't list dates this information appears to be from late 2010 or early 2011, much more recent than the last batch of media from 2008.
