= Elveon =

Cancelled video game

- Developer: 10tacle Studios
- Engine: Unreal Engine 3 SpeedTree (foliage)
- Platforms: Microsoft Windows, PlayStation 3, Xbox 360
- Release: Cancelled
- Genres: Action, role-playing video game
- Modes: Single-player, multiplayer

Elveon was a video game in development for Microsoft Windows, PlayStation 3 and Xbox 360. The status of the project is now unknown, as the original development team went out of business and no known updates to the games have been released in several years.

Originally developed by 10Tacle studios in Bratislava, Slovakia; financial difficulties of the 10Tacle group lead to the closure of its Bratislava studios, the game was expected to be finished by an English studio (Climax) in co-operation with 10Tacle. In 2008 with the transfer of development the game was stated as being for the PS3 and Xbox 360. A PC version is not being developed.

(About 10Tacle): ... the company has decided to close its Bratislava site, which has been responsible for the Elveon production up till now. The tasks for the finalization of production have already been assigned to other locations and the cooperation partner Climax Group in Portsmouth, England. The restructuring process will continue in full swing; the new cost and efficiency-optimized structure should be ready by no later than the summer of 2008.

Gameplay videos and previews show the game to be a third person viewpoint combat game set in a high fantasy universe; the game is primarily single-player, though basic multiplayer options have been promised; such as one on one battles.

The April 2008 update of the Climax Group website a new Xbox 360 / PlayStation 3 unnamed fantasy project has been unveiled, assumed to be the continuation of the project as the small image released for it shows a resemblance with Elveon, although no official statement has been released yet.

== About the game; story, universe and history ==
In the game world "Elveon" means "The book of elves", which tells the story of an Elvish civilization in the world of Naon: The gods have left the world of Naon leaving the Neamas (elves) there alone. The game was to follow the story of an elvish warrior:

The profound saga tells of the rise of the heroic Elvish culture from the perspective of an experienced elite warrior. Following his destiny he attempts to change his people's fate drastically by freeing the forgotten city of Nimathar, the portal to the realm of the Gods. A task normally reserved for the Gods themselves!

== Cancellation ==
This project has officially been cancelled due to uncertain difficulties, as mentioned by a designer of the game.

== Revival ==
In 2015, former 10Tacle employees announced acquisition of the Elveon trademark, licences and assets, bound to the game Elveon. They started to develop the game on Unreal Engine 4 technology. More information can be found on elveonthegame.com. However, that website went down sometime in 2017 and the third attempt at this game's development is likely cancelled.
