= Brothers in Arms: Furious 4 =

2015 video game

- Developer: Gearbox Software
- Series: Brothers in Arms
- Engine: Unreal Engine 3
- Platforms: Microsoft Windows, PlayStation 3, Xbox 360
- Release: Cancelled
- Genre: First-person shooter
- Modes: Single-player, multiplayer

Brothers in Arms: Furious 4, later called Furious 4, was a first-person shooter video game which was being developed by Gearbox Software. It was unveiled by Ubisoft at their E3 2011 conference. Originally set to be published by Ubisoft and be part of the Brothers in Arms series, the title eventually became an independent intellectual property for Gearbox Software. The project was ultimately cancelled by Gearbox in July 2015, with many of the gameplay elements transferred to another project, Battleborn.

== Plot ==
Following its unveiling at E3 2011, Brothers in Arms: Furious 4 has presented itself as a casualized sequel to the Brothers in Arms titles, taking a different approach to its World War II subject matter. Instead of portraying a realistic take on war focusing on Staff Sgt. Matt Baker of the 101st Airborne Division, Furious 4 would follow four new characters of an unnamed unit on a fictional romp through Germany after Hitler.

The four protagonists are Chok, a Native American soldier who uses hatchets to dispatch enemies; Montana, a large lumberjack turned Nazi slayer who wields a machine gun; Crockett, a Texas native who uses a cattle iron to brand fallen enemies; and Stitch, a mentally unstable Irishman who shocks enemies with a custom made taser.

== Development ==
Furious 4 was announced at Ubisoft's E3 2011 press conference, originally scheduled to be released in the first half of 2012. Ubisoft abandoned the trademarks for Furious 4 in May 2012. The rights to both Furious 4 and the Brothers in Arms series belong to Gearbox Software. Originally known as Brothers in Arms: Furious 4, Gearbox Software president Randy Pitchford stated that Furious 4 would not be part of the Brothers in Arms series and will become a new intellectual property due to negative fan reception in Penny Arcade Expo. He declared that the game has been undergoing some drastic changes.

Pitchford had stated in 2013 that a new entry in the Brothers in Arms series will arrive in the future, but Gearbox will hold off on making an announcement on the game until the time is appropriate. In a 2014 interview with Polygon, Pitchford explained about the decision to turn Furious 4 into a new intellectual property, saying that after plenty of internal discussion, the studio came to the conclusion that "Furious 4 just wasn't right for Brothers in Arms". He said this led to a decision that Brothers in Arms did deserve a new game which they had been working on for a while and it would be announced when they feel it is the right time to do so.

Pitchford revealed that Furious 4 "is not a thing anymore". Many elements of the game were inherited by and transferred to Battleborn, which is a new intellectual property from Gearbox. The company announced that they were working on a new "authentic" Brothers in Arms video game, and was seeking additional help from external developers. Currently, no news about new game from Brothers in Arms series came afterwards.

== Reception ==
While the announcement CGI trailer garnered comparisons to Quentin Tarantino's Inglourious Basterds, previews of Gearbox's E3 gameplay demo describe the game as a combination of the studio's previous game Borderlands and Bulletstorm by People Can Fly and Epic Games. However, Arthur Gies from IGN was uneasy about the game for being non-contextual, as it does not possess the historical accuracy Brothers in Arms is known for.
