= Eight Days =

Cancelled video game

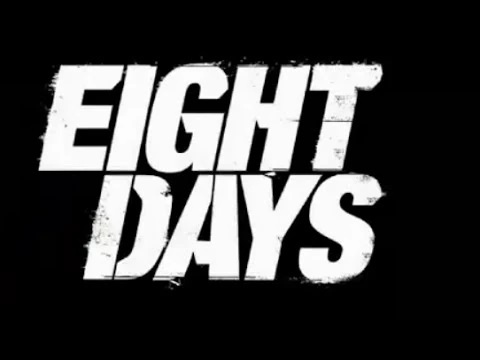
- Developer: London Studio
- Publisher: Sony Computer Entertainment
- Platform: PlayStation 3
- Release: Cancelled
- Genre: Action
- Mode: Single-player

Eight Days is an unreleased action video game that was being developed by London Studio and published by Sony Computer Entertainment for the PlayStation 3. The game was reported to have been cancelled on 4 June 2008, but was later revealed in October 2009 that the game was merely on hold. Although a portion of the game was used in a tech demo at E3 in 2005, the game was first announced at Sony's E3 2006 press conference.

== Gameplay ==
The game was to be set over the course of eight days, and to be set in eight different states, which would have made it the largest game map at the time. The game would have also included a real life clock. If the game was being played at night, it would be night in the game. The player would be able to choose between two characters, one "good" and one "bad". In the "bad" character's storyline, he attempts to get revenge on a mob syndicate. The other storyline would follow the "good" character, a detective searching for the same mob syndicate, after he kidnaps his son. The two characters end up crossing paths, and eventually work together.

== Development and history ==
=== Development ===
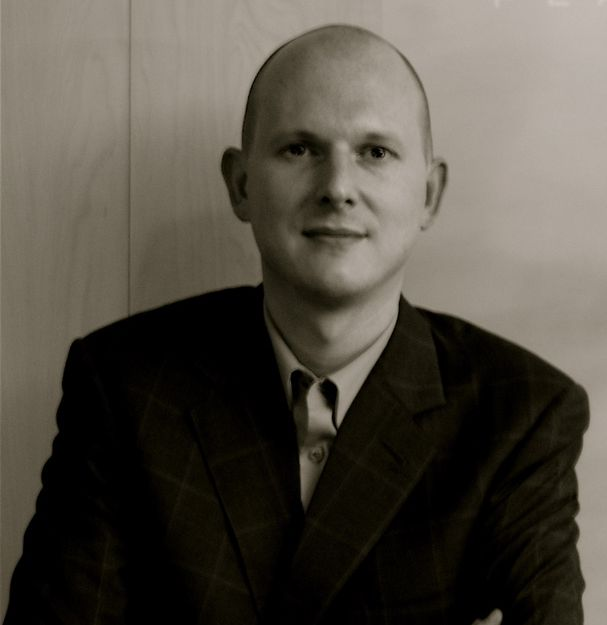
Phil Harrison stated that the tech demo of a gas station shown at E3 2005 was gameplay of an unannounced game.

Eight Days was being developed by London Studio. The game had a team of 63 development members, which would have been expanded to 80, with an additional 40 outsourced workers. After the production of Eight Days was completed, a bulk of the development team was to begin working on development of the next iteration of The Getaway. Eight Days senior producer Phil James explained in an interview with The Guardian: "The idea is to have two pre-production teams and one production team, which flips onto whatever product, at that point of time, is ready to have that team working on it".

=== Trailer ===
A scene from Eight Days was first shown as an unnamed tech demo during Sony's E3 2005 press conference. The scene showed a gas station exploding. It was used to demonstrate how the PS3's Cell processor would handle visual effects and physics. In March 2006, the game was then shown at SCE's platform keynote as a demo entitled "PlayStation 3: Beyond the Box". The demo was of a car getting shot at and then exploding. After the bullets hit the engine of the car, the car exploded, causing the wheels to fall off.

Eight Days was officially announced in a trailer that was played during Sony's E3 2006 press conference. The trailer began with a scene of two men staring at guns inside the trunk of a car. The trailer then cuts to a group of people standing in the Arizona desert. It then cuts to a scene in which passengers in two separate sports cars are shooting at each other. After being shot at, one of the cars flips over, destroying it. The other car arrives at the spot where the group of people were standing. They then engage in a gun battle with the two men from the first scene. The fight continues, and eventually the two men run off as a tanker truck slides and crashes into a diner, causing an explosion. The trailer then cuts to the logo of the game. A final scene after the logo is displayed shows one of the men picking up a lighter from the body of a dead enemy. He then flicks open the lighter and drops it in the gasoline from the tanker. As he walks away an explosion occurs.

There was discussion in whether the trailer featured actually in-game footage. Several scenes from the trailer included a full HUD, suggesting that the footage was of real-time gameplay. Patrick Klepek from 1UP.com referred to the footage as having "almost too much polish" compared to other games that were shown. Alex Navarro from GameSpot also questioned the footage: "Certain sequences included a full HUD, but even then, is it too good to be true?". Mike Jackson from CVG UK considered the footage to be "blatantly pretend in-game CGI".

== Cancellation ==
On 4 June 2008 Sony Computer Entertainment announced that Eight Days, along with The Getaway 3, had been cancelled. Sony released a statement on the cancellation: "This decision was made following an internal review of all games and it was deemed that with the incredibly strong list of exclusive first party titles coming up both this year and in the near future, resource should be reallocated to enhance those projects closer to completion". Two weeks after the cancellation of Eight Days, President of Sony Computer Entertainment, Shuhei Yoshida said that the lack of an online mode in Eight Days was "part of the consideration" to cancel the game. He also stated that the cancellation of Eight Days was not because it was failing in production, but because Sony is increasingly moving towards online-supported games, and Eight Days did not fit that overall strategy. However, in October 2009, it was confirmed that the game had not been cancelled, but merely put 'on hold'. The game was implied to have been cancelled according to an ex-developer of London Studio, but he also says that Eight Days was still in the pre-production phase at the time and hadn't reached full production.
