= ShadowClan (video game) =

Cancelled video game

- Developer: Tiger Hill Entertainment
- Platforms: PlayStation 3, Xbox 360
- Release: Cancelled
- Modes: Single-player, multiplayer

ShadowClan is a cancelled video game for the PlayStation 3 and Xbox 360 consoles. It would have been a single-player offline game with an online multiplayer option. The game was to be set in modern-day New York City, where gangs fight for territory. In the single-player game, the player controls a ninja who must use stealth and violence to overcome other gangs, the player is joined by allies who are controlled by artificial intelligence. The online component would have allowed players to create their own ninja clans to battle with rival players.

== Development ==
ShadowClan was originally being developed by Tiger Hill Entertainment, a production company started in 2003 in conjunction with Sega. Tiger Hill was headed by film director John Woo and producers Terence Chang and Brad Foxhoven, who also produced Stranglehold. Tiger Hill had five video games in development, but after Woo decided to focus his shift to films, Tiger Hill abandoned the project. Together with comic book writer David Wohl Foxhoven started a new company called Titan Productions. Titan took over ShadowClan and were looking for a new director for the project. Titan hoped to turn the video game also into a film.
