= Fallen Frontier =

- Developer: Moonshot Games
- Platforms: XBLA, PSN, Microsoft Windows
- Release: Cancelled
- Genres: Shooter, side-scroller

Fallen Frontier was a video game being developed by Moonshot Games for XBLA, PSN, and Microsoft Windows. The 2D side-scrolling shooter demoed at PAX East 2011 is the first game announced by Moonshot Games, which was formed in 2009 by former Bungie employees. However, the game was announced as cancelled in January 2013.
