= Scivelation =

Unreleased video game

- Developer(s): Black Wing Foundation
- Publisher(s): TopWare Interactive
- Engine: Unreal Engine 3
- Platform(s): Microsoft Windows; PlayStation 4 Xbox One
- Genre(s): Action-adventure, third-person shooter
- Mode(s): Single-player

Scivelation (previously known as Salvation) is a third-person shooter video game being developed by Ukrainian developer Black Wing Foundation for Microsoft Windows, Xbox One and PlayStation 4.

== Development ==
The game was initially known as Salvation and was being developed using the Source Engine for PC and Xbox 360. A teaser trailer of this version was released in 2008. In October 2009, it was announced that a publisher has been found and the game was reintroduced as Scivelation, running on the Unreal Engine 3 and being developed for PC, Xbox 360 and PlayStation 3.

Later, it was cancelled, but development restarted in 2013 for the same platforms. In early 2014, the PlayStation 3 and Xbox 360 versions were cancelled and replaced with the new PlayStation 4 and Xbox One versions.

The game was originally planned to be released in 2016, however, this has been continuously delayed and as of 2025, publisher TopWare has yet to announce a release date.
