= Interstellar Marines =

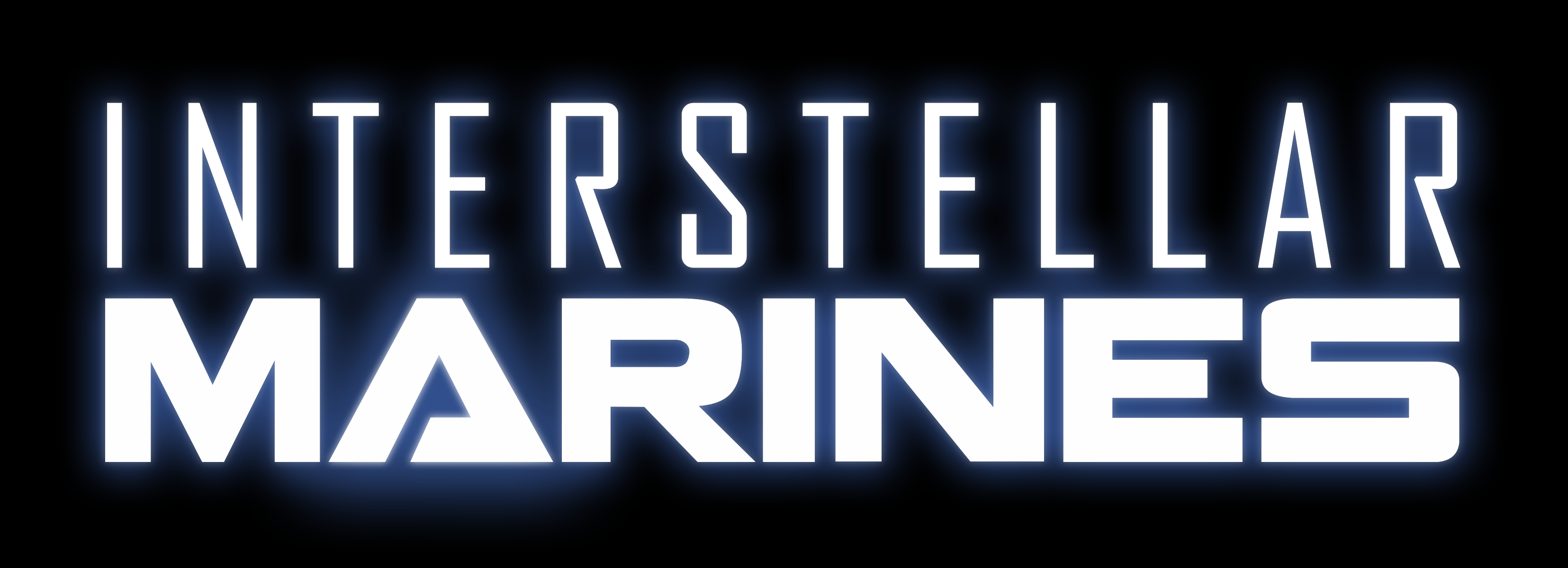
- Developer: Zero Point Software
- Publisher: Zero Point Software
- Director: Kim Haar Jørgensen
- Producers: Tanner Baggett, Paul Allen (formerly)
- Writers: Kim Haar Jørgensen, Jacob Smith (story)
- Composer: Nicolai Grønborg
- Engine: Unity 5
- Platforms: Microsoft Windows, macOS, Linux
- Release: July 2, 2013 (Early Access)
- Genres: First-person shooter, Action role-playing, Tactical shooter
- Modes: Single-player, multiplayer

Interstellar Marines is a discontinued science fiction first-person shooter video game that was developed by indie studio Zero Point Software until 2019. It was added to Steam Greenlight on September 3, 2012 and later released on Steam Early Access on July 2, 2013.

Interstellar Marines was being developed in four acts, formerly planned as individual titles. The first act, code-named "Prologue", was in development and took place in a future military training facility that staged multiplayer, single-player, and cooperative training scenarios. Multiplayer was the first feature of Prologue to be built, doubling as both a tech foundation for future co-op missions and as a playable Early Access release on Steam. The first co-op mission, titled The NeuroGen Incident, was released on September 26, 2014 which built much of the technology needed for intended future co-op campaigns.

The three envisioned acts after Prologue, collectively titled the "Trilogy", would have been narrative-driven campaigns spanning a continuous story arc set in "a realistic and unpredictable future where first contact with another sentient species is slowly becoming reality." The campaigns would have supported single-player and up to four players in drop-in/drop-out co-op. Zero Point Software claims that their co-op campaign would have featured tactical game-play, role-playing elements, open-ended level design, and a compelling sci-fi storyline. It claims to pay homage to old-school tactical first person shooters like Rainbow Six 3: Raven Shield and cites System Shock 2 and Deus Ex for their action RPG elements and open-ended levels, as well as Half-Life for its first person narrative-driven storytelling.

== Gameplay ==
The player controls an individual Marine from a first person perspective with functions for walking, running, jumping, crouching, peeking over cover, leaning, sprinting, and sliding. The Marine suite has regenerative armor and the Marine will be disabled when the armor is fully damaged. The Marine's suit also measures oxygen saturation levels, which increase due to activity and affect the player's aim stability as the level increases. The Marine has three weapons available, a pistol, submachine gun, and assault rifle. The SMG and AR can have a suppressor attached and have three fire modes, semi-auto, burst, and full-auto, while the pistol only fires in semi-auto mode. Each weapon features a tactical flashlight and a laser sight. Game modes feature PvE and PvP encounters. In PvE, players fight against several types of Combat Training Robots (CTRs), androids which can carry weapons or can charge at the player with a weaponless melee attack. All modes allow reviving fallen teammates, within a time limit, at the location where they fell.

The single-player and co-op content consists of campaign-style missions, Elimination challenges, and Survival challenges. Missions require following waypoints to objectives, which can include routing power or finding key cards to unlock sections of a map, while eliminating enemy CTRs. Elimination challenges require eliminating all CTRs on a map and Survival challenges require activating power nodes around a map while eliminating or avoiding spawning CTRs. If a fallen teammate is not revived within a time limit, they will respawn at a checkpoint or will be locked out of a mission once available respawns have been depleted.

Some of the PvP modes offered are Deathmatch, Team Deathmatch, Team Domination, and Deadlock. These modes all share the same map pool and players have infinite ammo allowing unlimited weapon reloads. In team-based modes, if a player is not revived, they will respawn at a spawn point automatically. Team Domination is a king of the hill mode with a moving capture zone. Each team starts with 1000 points. Teams deplete points from the opposing team by having more players than the opponent within the designated zone. The dominating team depletes points each second for each player within the zone more than the opponent. The losing team is the team that reaches 0 points first or the team with the least points after 10 minutes have elapsed. Deadlock is a team-based territory capture mode. A Deadlock match consists of multiple rounds on one map. To win a map, a team must win the first 3 rounds or otherwise win 2 rounds in a row. The first team to eliminate all players or to capture all seven capture zones at once wins the round. Fallen players who are not revived in time will enter a respawn queue and will respawn automatically after 2 minutes, but will be respawned earlier if a teammate captures a capture zone. The round ends after 10 minutes if no team has secured a win.

Wargames is a family of PvP game modes supporting up to 64 players and offering survival sandbox gameplay. It's mainly defined by 2 specific modes: Hell Week (battle royale), and Scavenge (with unlimited respawns). Wargames consists of 9 connected maps, each representing a different environment. Wargames is the only mode where players have limited ammo. Players start with only a loaded pistol and must scavenge weapons, ammo, and Combat Points from crates scattered across the maps. Any player can revive any other player and a player drops everything they had collected when killed. CTRs patrol the maps and will also drop points and weapons when killed. Drop crates with a large number of Combats Points are deployed to designated zones at regular intervals. Teams can be formed and disbanded at will over the course of the match, with up to 4 players per team all sharing Combat Points. The player or team with the most Combat Points at the end of a match (usually spanning 55 minutes) wins.

=== Demos ===
Prior to releasing on Steam's Early Access, Zero Point Software released playable demos in order to demonstrate how development was progressing. Four demos were released on their website:

- The Vault was an in-game showroom of some of the main characters and equipment that would have been in the game.
- Bullseye was a shooting range minigame where the player could complete objectives and unlock more powerful weapons as the player progress.
- Running Man set the player against waves of attacking android training machines and allowed players to move around and experience combat game-play.
- Deadlock was the last demo to be released and was the precursor to the version of Interstellar Marines released on Steam Early Access.

== Development ==
Development of Interstellar Marines began in May, 2005 under the working title Project IM. It was announced in November, 2005 and was described by the developers as "a AAA, FPS, sci-fi, action and adventure game." It was initially planned for release on Microsoft Windows, PlayStation 3 and Xbox 360, with the game being built using Epic Games' Unreal Engine. A demo was completed in 2007 and Zero Point Software met with publishers at GDC in 2008, but, during the 2008 financial crisis, investors later pulled out. Development restarted with the Unity game engine in 2009.

The game was initially funded by player pre-orders and an external investor. This mitigated the need for publisher backing whilst attempting to produce a game of higher quality than is typically released by independent developers. Zero Point Software called their early crowdfunding model "AAA Indie". Players would pre-order the game while it was still in early development and gain access to demos or the current game build in its entirety. Interstellar Marines was greenlit through Steam Greenlight on September 3, 2012. The game's release on Steam Early Access on July 2, 2013 almost completely superseded the initial crowdfunding model.

In October, 2012, Zero Point Software attempted a Kickstarter campaign with a $600,000 funding goal by November 28, 2012. Their campaign failed to meet its goal, with only $157,906 pledged from 3,823 backers.

Between the Steam release in 2013 and the end of 2015, Zero Point Software released 24 major game updates for Interstellar Marines. On January 7, 2016, it was announced that Early Access game sales could no longer support the game's development and that the paid development team had been let go. The original game director continued working on the game in spare time, with help from volunteers who enabled the release of several updates.
