= Theseis =

Cancelled video game

- Theseis logo.
- Developer: Track7 Games
- Producer: Kyriakos Raptopoulos
- Programmers: George Markou, Michael Georgoulopoulos, John Tsiombikas, Kostas Michalopoulos, Ioannis Makris
- Engine: Proprietary
- Platforms: Xbox 360, Microsoft Windows
- Release: Cancelled
- Genre: Action-adventure
- Mode: Single-player

Theseis was a third-person action-adventure video game developed by Greek indie development team Track7 Games. Development began in 2004, and the game was planned for release on the Xbox 360 and PC in early 2008. The game would be set in modern-day Athens and star a duo of paranormal investigators caught between mundane and supernatural worlds. The game would have featured a cast of characters from Greek mythology, while the plot would have players follow clues in search of a long-lost ancient artifact that could spell disaster for the entire human race.

Despite garnering a lot of interest by both local and international media, Theseis languished in development hell for almost half a decade, before being unceremoniously cancelled in August 2009 due to a shortage in funds.

== Gameplay ==
Theseis was presented in third-person perspective, with the camera trailing behind the character. Players would take control of one of two playable characters, named Andronicos and Phoebe. Character movement in the game would include real time activities such as running, jumping, and climbing, allowing for complex interactions with the environment, while elements of stealth gameplay would also be incorporated. The game would feature no gunplay and subsequently, the player would not be able to kill enemies. The main focus of the gameplay would rather be on the player having to solve a variety of puzzles, requiring the player to combine objects, abilities and items of their inventory in order to make progress.

Both characters were planned to acquire a special ability as the game progressed. Andronicos' True Sight would give players the ability to see and interact with items from the ancient world. Phoebe's ability would allow the player to automatically decipher ancient symbols, hieroglyphics and mechanisms pivotal to the solving of environmental puzzles.

Theseis would also feature an inventory system that would allow players to examine and manipulate found objects through a 3D interface. Players would be able to combine objects through this interface in order to craft new items and solve puzzles.

== Plot ==
Andronicos Kalogirou, a paranormal investigator with a small office in the historic center of Athens, is a man devoted to science, waging an ongoing war against superstition. He diligently works to uncover the truth behind paranormal phenomena, determined to prove that anything supernatural has a logical explanation, and can be attributed to drunken fantasies and uneducated hysteria. On the other hand, Phoebe, Andronicos' adopted sister, is a fervent believer of the supernatural.

Upon learning that their father Costas has gone missing, and is presumed dead, the duo embarks on a quest to uncover an ancient conspiracy kept hidden throughout the ages through stealth and murder. Throughout their journey, they uncover a hidden network of caves beneath Athens, crawling with remnants and treasures of a long lost era. Their travels will take them to other locations of myth and legend, like Crete and Delphi, and encounter a number of colorful characters, from other explorers to beggars to actual mythological creatures and characters. They soon find themselves tracking down a long lost artifact, a source of immense power lay dormant, with the potential to either ascend, or doom the entire human race.

== Development and cancellation ==
Theseis began development in 2004, and was originally intended to be a point and click adventure game, with strong similarities to Syberia. After the assembly of a small team and with funding provided by Track7 Games Founder and CEO Kyriakos Raptopoulos, eight months of the development effort were put into a promotional cinematic that was unveiled at E3 2005. Along with Darkfall, Theseis was considered a strong prospect for the Greek video gaming industry, due to its high production values and ambitious scope similar to that of big-budget productions. The game was planned for release for PC and next-generation consoles, and while the PC and Xbox 360 versions of the game were confirmed, a PlayStation 3 version was eventually dropped.

Following the game's reveal, and fueled by the positive feedback from E3, Track7 made radical changes to the original design, departing from the original point ‘n click format and turn Theseis into an action-adventure game more similar to Tomb Raider: Legend. The decision was made to unveil the new direction the game was taking at E3 2006, this time with a playable demo. The game had a successful showing, featuring top notch graphics and responsive platforming controls, eliciting positive reaction from the press and attracting several top publishers.

Despite these early milestones however, development on Theseis began facing a series of issues during the next two years, as the development team faced problems with the proprietary engine it had developed for the E3 demo, and had to resort to a clean re-write; leadership roles were redistributed among staff members to keep up with other obligations (such as the lead programmer departing the company for the duration of a year to serve in the military); the game's script had to be re-written to match the story to the concept the game was marketed as; and financial issues began setting in, leading to large stretches of delayed payroll and the departure of several staff members, who opted to take legal action against Track7. As disappointment began setting in, the team was reduced to just 7 people, mostly artists, who kept the company afloat until August 2009. Eventually, the costs to salvage the project with the people remaining were deemed too high, and the whole project was cancelled as a result.
