= Earth No More =

- Developer: Radar Group
- Engine: Unreal Engine 3
- Platforms: Microsoft Windows, PlayStation 3, Xbox 360
- Release: Cancelled
- Genre: First-person shooter
- Modes: Single-player, multiplayer

Earth No More is a cancelled first-person shooter video game that was supposed to be produced by Radar Group (formerly by 3D Realms).

== Setting ==
Earth No More opens in a small New England town quarantined due to a mysterious outbreak. Poisonous red vines have been spreading quickly (similar to the red weed in The War of the Worlds) simultaneously strangling and terra-forming the environment. The main character is at the town with the four other characters that he will team up with.

== Development ==
Earth No More was scheduled to be released in 2009 for Microsoft Windows, PlayStation 3 and Xbox 360 video game consoles by the Finnish developer Recoil Games. The release was postponed indefinitely in 2009 due to 3D Realms' financial reasons and their layoffs, and in February 2011 Recoil Games told the Finnish financial newspaper Kauppalehti that they are no longer involved in the project. In the Radar Group website, the developer of the game is listed as "unannounced".

In June 2012 Earth No More appeared on several websites including Gambitious, Symbid and Impact Crowd, all of which are websites dedicated to projects being invested in by people in the game industry. A description of Earth No More by 3D Realms was: Mankind's relentless destruction of Earth awakens a biological response from deep within the planet's crust that threatens an environmental apocalypse. This signaled the rumored revival of Earth No More under 3D Realms' helm with rumors circulating the internet about a Summer 2012 announcement of the title, but nothing was ever released.

=== Controversy ===
In February 2008 Edge reported that 3D Realms was being sued by Cinemagraphix Entertainment for stealing the idea of the Earth No More video game. Cinemagraphix claimed that they had pitched the idea in 2005 to various game developers including 3D Realms. Cinemagraphix complaints accuse the defendants (3D Realms), of copyright infringement, unlawful competition, misappropriation, unfair business practices, unjust enrichment, conspiracy and other claims. They said that 3D Realms had not just stolen the name but the premise and concept art as well, stating that their concept and the in-development shooter are "virtually identical in substance".
