= Sundown (video game) =

Unreleased video game

- Developer: Terminal Reality
- Publisher: Ubisoft
- Engine: Gamebryo
- Platforms: PlayStation 3, Xbox 360
- Release: Unreleased
- Genres: Action, survival horror
- Mode: Single-player

Sundown (also known as Guillermo del Toro's Sundown) is an unreleased video game that was under development by Terminal Reality for the PlayStation 3 and Xbox 360. Not much is known about the game, except that film director Guillermo del Toro was co-developing the game, and it would take place in a world where the players would have to survive an apocalypse while fighting against zombies. According to del Toro, the game would have been similar to Left 4 Dead.

Events in the game ratchet up the terror and game opportunities as the game goes from the calm hours before the first outbreak to the worst moments in these characters' lives.

The game fell into difficulties and was postponed for some time, but according to a 2006 article on Joystiq.com, it was cancelled in favor of two new projects.
