= The Lord of the Rings: The White Council =

- Developer(s): EA Redwood Shores
- Publisher(s): Electronic Arts
- Platform(s): PlayStation 3, Xbox 360, Microsoft Windows
- Genre(s): Role-playing video game
- Mode(s): Single player, Multiplayer

The Lord of the Rings: The White Council is an unreleased role-playing video game that started development at EA Redwood Shores and targeted Microsoft Windows, PlayStation 3 and Xbox 360, intending to be the first Middle-earth game to release on the PlayStation 3. It was to be based on the high fantasy novel The Lord of the Rings by J. R. R. Tolkien, however on February 2, 2007, EA announced that the game had been put on an indefinite hiatus, and to date no further information has been released.

== Development ==
Project Gray Company was the game's working title, which was to be a new offering in EA’s series of videogames inspired by Tolkien’s books and Jackson’s film adaptations. Initial details were limited about the game, but the official site contained art, pictures of the team working on this game, forums, a wallpaper, and a designer's diary feature (which included, at first, only humorous "behind-the-scenes" videos which purported to share design details but which were "accidentally" out-of-focus or otherwise unintelligible). The website also contained a letter from the game's executive producer Steve Gray:

The action takes place in a massive open world where you can go anywhere you want, and the characters in this world are powered by an incredible simulation AI based on the same technology used by the makers of The Sims 3. The story of the game is built around a series of Story Quests. You can choose to follow specific Story Quests, embark on a range of other types of quests, or set off on your own adventures in the massive open world environment.

Included with the July 13, 2006 announcement was the information that since EA held the game development licenses to both Tolkien’s books and the New Line film trilogy, the game was to be based on both, like The Battle for Middle-earth II. Players were to be given the option to choose to play as either a Man, a Dwarf, an Elf or a Hobbit. The ultimate aim of the game was to become a hero allied with the White Council. The game was originally to be released late in 2007 on the PlayStation 3, Xbox 360 and PC. On February 2, 2007, however, it was announced that the game had been delayed indefinitely. This was said to be due to management problems. EA worked with Pandemic Studios to create The Lord of the Rings: Conquest instead on the same platforms, plus the Nintendo DS.
