= Mikolai Stroinski =

Polish composer (born 1979)

- Born: Mikołaj Stroiński; 3 June 1979 (age 47); Nairobi, Kenya
- Origin: Los Angeles, California, US
- Genres: Film music; television music; video game music; soundtrack
- Occupations: Composer, music producer
- Years active: 2004–present
- Website: mikolaistroinski.com

Mikolai Stroinski (or Mikołaj Stroiński, Polish pronunciation: [miˈkɔwaj strɔˈiɲskʲi]; born 3 June 1979) is a Polish film, television, and video game composer. He is best known for composing music for The Witcher 3: Wild Hunt, The Witcher 3: Blood and Wine, Thronebreaker: The Witcher Tales, The Vanishing of Ethan Carter, Age of Empires IV, Metamorphosis, Diablo Immortal, and Nobody Wants to Die. His work has received international recognition through awards from the Society of Composers & Lyricists, the Game Audio Network Guild, Digital Dragons, D.I.C.E and IGN the Canadian Game Awards, and other organizations.

== Life and career ==
He comes from a musical family. His father, Wojciech Stroiński, was a trumpeter and pianist in the Royal Rag Jazz Band in Poland (1969–1981). Mikolai was born in Nairobi, Kenya, and grew up in Warsaw and Zalesie Górne near the Polish capital. He graduated from the Karol Szymanowski Academy of Music in Katowice and the Berklee College of Music (2001) in Boston (2004), where he studied film scoring and jazz piano under Ray Santisi.

== Career ==
=== Early work ===
After graduating from Berklee College of Music, Stroinski settled in Los Angeles and established a music production studio. During the early stages of his career he composed and produced music for American television networks including CBS, NBC, ABC, FOX, Discovery Channel, History Channel, TLC, Spike TV, Lifetime, Animal Planet, and the CW. His music was used in numerous reality, documentary, and entertainment programs, including The Apprentice, Survivor, Kitchen Nightmares, Hell's Kitchen, Big Brother, Pawn Stars, and America's Next Top Model. He worked with David Vanacore for those shows.

He also worked on film and television productions in both Europe and North America, composing scores for feature films, documentaries, and television dramas. Among his early projects were Wonderful Summer, Modjeska – Woman Triumphant, Hired Gun, Paradoks, Bez Tajemnic (the Polish adaptation of ''In Treatment''), and Zbrodnia.

=== Video game music ===
Stroinski's international profile increased substantially through his work in the video game industry. His score for The Vanishing of Ethan Carter (2014) received critical acclaim and established him as one of the leading composers working in narrative-driven games.

In 2015 he served as one of the principal composers of The Witcher 3: Wild Hunt, collaborating with Marcin Przybyłowicz and contributing several of the game's best-known musical themes. He later composed music for the acclaimed expansion Blood and Wine (2016), helping shape the musical identity of the duchy of Toussaint. The soundtrack received widespread praise and contributed to the game's numerous industry awards.

Following the success of The Witcher 3, Stroiński composed music for a diverse range of titles, including GWENT, Thronebreaker: The Witcher Tales, Sniper Ghost Warrior 3, Bee Simulator, Metamorphosis, Chernobylite, Age of Empires IV, Diablo Immortal, and Nobody Wants to Die. His work is characterized by the integration of orchestral writing, ethnic instrumentation, electronic textures, and thematic storytelling.

In the 2020s he continued to compose for major international productions, including Riot Games' League of Legends, Blizzard Entertainment's Diablo Immortal, and Rebel Wolves' The Blood of Dawnwalker.

=== Animation ===
Animation has become a focus of Stroinski's career. He has composed scores for animated feature films including Diplodocus (released in the United States as The Green Dinosaur), The Boy at the Edge of the World, and Wonderland, starring Mads Mikkelsen. He is also composing the score for the upcoming Moss, which is currently in production.

=== Film and television ===
Alongside his game work, Stroinski has an active career in film and television. His credits include documentary, dramatic, and animated productions such as Over the Limit, Dangerous Words from the Fearless, The Liberator, Queen, Diplodocus, and The Boy at the Edge of the World. His music has been featured in productions distributed by Netflix and other international broadcasters.

== Musical style and influences ==
Stroinski's compositions frequently combine large-scale orchestral writing with folk, jazz, electronic, and world-music influences. Critics have noted his ability to create highly atmospheric musical environments that support narrative storytelling while maintaining strong melodic identities. His work often emphasizes cultural specificity, particularly in historical and fantasy settings, while employing contemporary production techniques.

His scores for The Witcher series are particularly noted for their use of Slavic musical influences and regional instrumentation, while later projects such as Age of Empires IV and Diablo Immortal demonstrate a broader global and historical palette.

== Selected works ==
=== Video games ===
Year	Game	Developer
2014	MouseCraft	Crunching Koalas
2014	The Vanishing of Ethan Carter	The Astronauts
2014	The Witcher Adventure Game	CD Projekt Red, Can Explode Games
2015	The Witcher 3: Wild Hunt	CD Projekt Red
2017	Sniper Ghost Warrior 3	CI Games
2017	Gwent: The Witcher Card Game	CD Projekt Red
2018	Thronebreaker: The Witcher Tales	CD Projekt Red
2018	Kursk	Jujubee
2018	Attack of the Earthlings	Team Junkfish
2018	Detached: Non-VR Edition	Anshar Studios
2019	Bee Simulator	Varsav Game Studios
2019	Sniper Ghost Warrior Contracts	CI Games
2020	Metamorphosis	Ovid Works
2021	Chernobylite	The Farm 51
2021	Age of Empires IV	Relic Entertainment, World's Edge
2022	Diablo Immortal	Blizzard Entertainment, NetEase
2024	Nobody Wants to Die	Critical Hit Games
2025	Assassin's Creed Jade	Ubisoft
2026	The Blood of Dawnwalker	Rebel Wolves, Bandai Namco Entertainment

=== Television ===
- Breakthrough with Tony Robbins (2010)
- Baby Boomer Bunnies (2011)
- Paradoks (2012)
- Without Secrets (2012–2013)
- Zbrodnia (2014–2015)
- Kaprys losu (2016)
- The Liberator (2020)
- Capelli Code (2021)
- Queen (2022)

=== Film ===
- Hired Gun (2009)
- Modjeska – Woman Triumphant (2009)
- Wonderful Summer (2010)
- Marchewkowe pole (2016)
- Over the Limit (2017)
- Dangerous Words from the Fearless (2017)
- Diplo: The Mighty Dinosaur (2024)
- The Boy at the Edge of the World (2025)

== Awards and nominations ==
Year	Result	Award	Category	Work	Ref.
2014	Won	Annual Game Music Awards	Best Score Orchestral / Cinematic; Outstanding Contribution – Newcomer of the Year	The Vanishing of Ethan Carter	
2015	Nominated	18th Annual D.I.C.E. Awards	Outstanding Achievement in Original Music Composition	The Vanishing of Ethan Carter	
2015	Nominated	Game Developers Choice Awards	Best Audio	The Vanishing of Ethan Carter	
2015	Nominated	Hollywood Music in Media Awards	Best Original Score – Video Game	The Vanishing of Ethan Carter	
2015	Nominated	Hollywood Music in Media Awards	Best Original Score – Video Game	The Witcher 3: Wild Hunt	
2015	Won	NAVGTR Awards	Original Dramatic Score, Franchise	The Witcher 3: Wild Hunt	
2015	Won	Best of IGN	Best Original Music	The Witcher 3: Wild Hunt	
2015	Nominated	The Game Awards	Best Score / Soundtrack	The Witcher 3: Wild Hunt	
2015	Won	PlayStation.Blog Game of the Year Awards	Best Soundtrack	The Witcher 3: Wild Hunt	
2015	Won	Global Game Awards	Best Audio	The Witcher 3: Wild Hunt	
2019	Won	Digital Dragons Awards	Best Game Soundtrack	Thronebreaker: The Witcher Tales	
2020	Won	Music+Sound Awards	Best Original Composition in Gaming	Bee Simulator	
2020	Nominated	Game Audio Network Guild Awards	Best Original Instrumental; Best Music in a Casual Game; Best Original Soundtrack Album	Bee Simulator	
2020	Won	Game Audio Network Guild Awards	Best Music for an Indie Game	Bee Simulator	
2021	Nominated	Game Audio Network Guild Awards	Best Music for an Indie Game	Metamorphosis	
2021	Nominated	Game Audio Network Guild Awards	Music of the Year	Metamorphosis	
2021	Won	Society of Composers & Lyricists	Outstanding Original Score for Interactive Media	Metamorphosis	
2022	Won	Canadian Game Awards	Best Score / Soundtrack	Age of Empires IV	
