= Sniper Ghost Warrior Contracts =

2019 tactical shooter game by CI Games

- North American cover art
- Developer: CI Games
- Publisher: CI Games
- Director: Martin Mark
- Producer: Karol Banaśkiewicz
- Designers: Daniel Sławiński; Jakub Przeździecki; Hubert Gubrynowicz
- Programmers: Nobert Siebor; Jarosłow Zakrzewski
- Artist: Jerzy Rogalski
- Writers: Magdalena Podczasi; Piotr Pacynko; Maria Piątkowska; Justin Villers; Jon Sloan
- Composer: Mikolai Stroinski
- Series: Sniper: Ghost Warrior
- Engine: CryEngine
- Platforms: Microsoft Windows; PlayStation 4; Xbox One
- Release: WW: 22 November 2019
- Genres: Tactical shooter, stealth
- Modes: Single-player, multiplayer

Sniper Ghost Warrior Contracts is a tactical shooter stealth video game developed and published by CI Games. It is the fifth entry of the Sniper: Ghost Warrior series and the sequel to Sniper Ghost Warrior 3. The game was released worldwide on 22 November 2019 for Microsoft Windows, PlayStation 4 and Xbox One. It received fairly positive reviews from critics, with some reviewers calling it an improvement over its predecessors. A sequel titled Sniper Ghost Warrior Contracts 2 was released in 2021.

== Gameplay ==
A screenshot showing the game at dawn

Unlike its predecessor Sniper Ghost Warrior 3, Sniper Ghost Warrior Contracts uses mission-based gameplay, instead of focusing on open world format. The game offers five sizable maps, allowing players to complete a total of 25 missions with open-ended contracts.

The game features a skill tree, redesigned from Sniper Ghost Warrior 3, that contains four tiers, which can be unlocked tier-by-tier by spending money. It features new "contract tokens", that come from main objectives, "challenge tokens" that can be acquired by accomplishing extra challenges, and "intel tokens" are collectables or bounties, with all of them being a must in getting access to higher tier skills and great damage weapons and loadouts.

== Plot ==
Siberia has claimed its independence after a war with Russia and Mongolia. Nergui Kurchatov, Siberia's prime minister, is skeptical of the people's hope for a fair distribution of wealth, and soon becomes an autocratic ruler. In the face of corruption and abuse of power of the new government, an armed opposition is established, called the Siberian Wolves.

A sniper mercenary, codenamed "Seeker", is sent on a series of dangerous missions by a mysterious sponsor codenamed "Handler", who is contracted to progressively eliminate members of Siberia's elite: General Dimitri Ivanovski; the CEO of an oil company, Igor Sekhov, and his wife Olga Kurchatova (sister of Nergui Kurchatov). Also included are a duo of crime lords: Sasha Petroshenko of the Yakutz clan, and Agvan Dorgev of West Siberian Syndicate; as well as a scientist seeking to genetically modify the Siberian people, Anatashia Elikanova, and her father, Zelik Elikanov, and finally Nergui Kurchatov himself as the last contract.

== Development ==
Sniper Ghost Warrior Contracts is developed by CI Games, which is the developer of the Sniper: Ghost Warrior series. It focuses on several smaller sandboxes instead of an open world map, after the CEO of CI Games Marek Tymiński admitted "big mistake" in chasing AAA with Sniper Ghost Warrior 3. The game was announced in August 2018, and received its first gameplay during E3 2019.

Sniper Ghost Warrior Contracts uses the CryEngine video game engine by Crytek, which is the same engine of Sniper: Ghost Warrior 2 and Sniper Ghost Warrior 3.

== Release ==
Sniper Ghost Warrior Contracts was released worldwide for Microsoft Windows, PlayStation 4 and Xbox One on 22 November 2019, when the game was only single-player mode available. A multiplayer mode was later added into the game in March 2020.

== Reception ==
Reception

Aggregate score
Aggregator	Score
Metacritic	PC: 71/100; PS4: 65/100; XONE: 67/100

Review scores
Publication	Score
GameStar	70/100
IGN	7.3/10
Jeuxvideo.com	15/20

Sniper Ghost Warrior Contracts received "mixed or average" reviews, according to review aggregator Metacritic.

David Jagneaux of IGN rated the game 7.3/10, praising the game's atmosphere and the number of gadgets available to use, but felt the size of the maps hindered the player. Daniel Weissenberger of GameCritics.com wrote the game "gets so much right" but thought its most notable flaw was the limited use of gadgets such as the mask and drone.

GameStar enjoyed the sniper simulation; they wrote it is neither too easy, nor too difficult. They complimented the sound design and array of gadgets. Also, they appreciated there are many possible solutions in the game. However, they criticized the plot as insignificant and the "all-powerful" artificial intelligence. They ultimately scored the game 70 out of 100.

Eurogamer Italia gave a score of 7/10, commenting the game was good for players who wanted a sniping game, but thought that when it comes to being a full-fledged first-person shooter, there were better options available on the market. GamerSky recommended the game, writing it was the first time the series showed an "impressive sniper experience." However, they criticized the story as forgettable and a number of bugs.

Jeux Video praises "very gripping" atmosphere, making the player "often have the impression of believing to be in a good old spy movie", while noting that "this feeling is broken by artificial intelligence that would have deserved better treatment". A far as the graphics are concerned, according to JeuxVideo "without reaching heights, the title is doing pretty well". The sound effects and the music are also praised by Jeux Video.

=== Sales ===
The PlayStation 4 version of Sniper Ghost Warrior Contracts was the thirteenth bestselling retail game during its first week of release in Japan, with 4,608 physical copies being sold. The game has sold 250,000 copies as of January 2020, with CI Games expected to see the sale number climb up to 600,000–700,000.
