= Lords of the Fallen (2023 video game) =

Action role-playing game by CI Games

- Developer: Hexworks
- Publisher: CI Games
- Director: Cezar Virtosu
- Series: Lords of the Fallen
- Engine: Unreal Engine 5
- Platforms: PlayStation 5; Windows; Xbox Series X/S
- Release: 13 October 2023
- Genre: Action role-playing
- Modes: Single-player, multiplayer

Lords of the Fallen is an action role-playing video game developed by Hexworks and published by CI Games. A reboot to the 2014 video game of the same name, the game was released for PlayStation 5, Windows, and Xbox Series X/S on 13 October 2023. It received mixed reviews from critics and sold over one million units in the first ten days since release.

== Gameplay ==
Lords of the Fallen is an action role-playing video game played from a third-person perspective. Like its predecessor, players can use melee weapons and magic to defeat enemies, and the gameplay adapts elements from soulsborne games. The game's campaign can be completed cooperatively with another player. The game features a player-versus-player multiplayer mode similar to invasions in Elden Ring.

At the beginning of the game, players can create and customize their own player avatar, and choose from one of nine character classes with their own equipment and attributes. Several game modifiers can also be selected to alter the game's properties, such as randomized enemies or pre-upgraded loot. Before finishing character creation, players may choose between the standard Legacy Mode or more difficult Veteran mode.

The game is set in an interconnected world, one that is several times bigger than the original 2014 game. Two distinct worlds are layered on top of each other. The world of Axiom is the realm of the living and players can use a magical lantern to access the world of Umbral, the realm of the dead. Despite sharing the same physical space, an inaccessible area in one realm may be reached by visiting the other realm. When the player is killed the first time in Axiom, they will be transported to the Umbral (for a second chance), until they can return to the realm of the living at set locations. However, if the player is killed again in the Umbral, they will respawn back in Axiom at their last save point and lose all their unspent experience points. These lost experience points, called Vigor, can only be reclaimed by returning to the location of their characters death. Checkpoints in each region are sparse, though if they choose to, players can craft their own checkpoints using materials collected from Umbral monsters. At checkpoints, known as Vestiges, players may leave the Umbral, level up their characters attributes, access multiplayer features, or fast-travel to a previously unlocked Vestige.

Combat in Lords of the Fallen can be close range with melee weapons or long range with spells or ranged weapons. Enemy attacks can be avoided by blocking with a shield or dodging. Spells consume mana to produce a variety of effects such as enhancing weapons, restoring hit points, or damaging enemies. The player can equip a weapon in each hand, and can equip one ranged option; Catalysts for using spells, ranged weapons, or throwables. The player can also swap from their ranged option to their magical lamp to see into the Umbral from Axiom, solve puzzles in the Umbral, and "soulflay" enemies among other utilities. Upon taking damage, players can regain any hit points lost by attacking enemies, but the opportunity ends the next time they take damage, similar to the Rally mechanic in Bloodborne. Enemies can be staggered after enough hits or attacks parried, letting the player perform a critical hit on the enemy.

Lords of the Fallen has a multiplayer system that allows players to be beckoned for cooperative play or invaded for player-versus-player (PvP) play through the internet. At a Vestige, players may beckon another player into their world to aid them with enemies or bosses. Players may also beckon another player for shared cooperation if both players have defeated a similar amount of bosses. Through shared cooperation, each player shares the same world state and any progression, items, and Vigor is kept by both players. With the Friend Pass, a player without the game may play entirely for free in a shared cooperation world with a host who owns a copy of the game. Players can also invade other online player's worlds to duel them, and invasions can be enabled or disabled in the settings.

== Plot ==
After eons under the rule of Adyr, the dark god of the demonic Rhogar, the followers of Orius the radiance god rose against him. Unable to kill Adyr, they instead seal him away in another realm and defeat the Rhogar. One of Orius' warriors, Judge Cleric, then established the order of the Hallowed Sentinels to watch over five magic beacons in the land of Mournstead to prevent Adyr from reviving. Over the ages, however, the once-righteous Sentinels become corrupted and tyrannical themselves.

Over a thousand years after Adyr's defeat, his return comes nearer as the beacons become tainted by his influence, and the Rhogar begin to infest the land again. A sect of the Sentinels, the Dark Crusaders, acquires a powerful artifact to try to prevent this: the Umbral Lamp. It possesses the power to resurrect its user, allowing travel between the realms of the living (Axiom) and the dead (Umbral), as well as pulling souls out of enemies and activate fragments of past events called Stigmas. However, when its previous bearer is killed, it comes into the possession of the player character: the Lamp Bearer. Exacter Dunmire, head of the Crusaders, recruits them to travel across Mournstead and cleanse the beacons with the Lamp, using it to absorb Adyr's essence at each one.

Each beacon is guarded by formidable enemies and each must be defeated to progress to the respective beacon, but the Bearer does not need to immediately interact with them. The expansive world is filled with dangerous animals, monsters, demons, cults, and even the corrupted forces of the Sentinels. Enemies and allies can be made throughout the journey, with some of the latter potentially turning against the Bearer based on their decisions. The beacon within the Empyrean, the Sentinel's headquarters, is guarded by Judge Cleric herself; partway through the battle, she is revealed to be entirely corrupted, just like the rest of the order. Once known as Iselle, she was a warrior priestess of Adyr before betraying him to side with Orius.

There are three endings the Bearer can achieve depending on choices made:

- "Radiant": If the Bearer has used the Lamp to cleanse at least one of the beacons, they can invade Bramis Castle and enter the Rhogar realm to face Adyr. The dark god attempts to reason that humanity needs a god to guide them; however, unlike Orius and the Sentinels, he offers humanity a choice and the truth. Nevertheless, the Bearer subdues Adyr and uses the Lamp to absorb his essence. The Bearer is obliterated in the process while Orius rains beams of radiance to purge all who have transgressed in his eyes, with no sin going unpunished.
- "Inferno": instead of cleansing the beacons, the Bearer can use an item called the Rune of Adyr to break them. After defeating Judge Cleric, the Bearer can enter her dream as Iselle and allow Adyr to possess her body, granting him a vessel and vengeance on her for betraying him. Ruling the world once more, the dark god makes the Bearer one of his Rhogar lords.
- "Umbral": rather than side with either god, the Bearer can enter the Umbral and locate a dark priest named Molhu, the creator of the Lamp, and gain access to an area called the Mother's Lull. From there, the Bearer sacrifices a number of important persons to meet the Putrid Mother, an unspeaking, god-like eldritch being. The creature devours the Bearer's essence, using it to shatter the veil between Axiom and the Umbral so it can start consuming all of creation, sparing nothing.

== Development and release ==
In December 2014, Tomasz Gop, the executive producer of Lords of the Fallen (2014), confirmed the development of a sequel, Lords of the Fallen 2. In May 2015, CI Games announced that the game would be released in 2017, and confirmed that Deck13 Interactive, the lead developer of the first game, would not be involved. Gop revealed in 2017 that the game spent two years on concept stage, and that CI Games has significantly downsized the development team and reduced the scope of the game following the disappointing release of Sniper: Ghost Warrior 3. CI Games announced that Defiant Studios will lead the game's development in 2018, and that they would restart the game's development from scratch. However, CI Games terminated its contract with Defiant one year later, as it deemed their works on the game "inadequate". CI Games then founded Hexworks in 2020, led by Saul Gascon, executive producer, and Cezar Virtosu, creative director, to work on the game. Lords of the Fallen was developed using Unreal Engine 5. The game cost $66.2 million to develop, market and produce the physical edition.

The game was revealed by CI Games during Gamescom 2022 as The Lords of the Fallen. It was then rebranded as simply Lords of the Fallen in March 2023. Virtosu revealed that the game was once named Lords of the Fallen: The Dark Crusade, though the studio dropped this name for not reflecting the game's status as a reboot of the series. Hexworks had high ambitions for the game, with Virtosu adding that the studio set out to be "the second reference [after FromSoftware]" for the Soulsborne genre by making "Dark Souls 4.5". It was released for PlayStation 5, Windows, and Xbox Series X/S on 13 October 2023.

A major set of patches was released to the base game in April 2025, called "version 2". It included improved cooperative play, quality-of-life improvements to reduce difficulty, a character creator, redone audio cues, and more tutorial and guidance features.

== Reception ==
Reception

Aggregate score
Aggregator	Score
Metacritic	(PC) 75/100 (PS5) 70/100 (XSXS) 77/100

Review scores
Publication	Score
Eurogamer	2/5
Famitsu	32/40
Game Informer	6/10
GameSpot	5/10
GamesRadar+	3.5/5
GameStar	85/100
Hardcore Gamer	3.5/5
IGN	8/10
PC Gamer (US)	79/100
PCGamesN	7/10
Push Square	7/10
Shacknews	9/10
VideoGamer.com	8/10

Lords of the Fallen received "generally favorable" reviews for the PC version from critics, while the PS5 version received "mixed or average" reviews, according to review aggregator website Metacritic. In Japan, four critics from Famitsu gave the game a total score of 32 out of 40.

The GamesRadar reviewer does not see "any relatable characters to latch onto", and the game's world seems for him to be "stuck somewhere between Blasphemous and all the black-mana cards from Magic: The Gathering". He writes the game's greatest strength is probably combat and that it is a nice feel to hit a blow. The reviewer describes the system of two worlds as "clever stuff that's implemented well". As far as performance is concerned, the reviewer wrote that "even on a robust desktop" he was forced to "turn down the graphics fairly significantly". He sums up, that the game's "clear aspirations to be Dark Souls 4 might have been a little ambitious". GameStar's reviewer, on the other hand, feels that the possibility of opening a window to the world of the dead alone makes "a harmonious world design".

PC Gamer's reviewer also likes the idea of the lamp used to cross between two worlds, even though he feels that "Hexworks could've done more with the concept". He also writes that using the lamp did not give performance problems, and the game generally ran smoothly. He likes different effects of using different weapons. According to the PC Gamer's reviewer, the magic system is "a genuine improvement over other soulslikes in almost every way". The reviewer claims the combat system "shines in the game's duels against humanoid bosses". He considers fights with the bosses to be fair, but the rest to be too difficult.

By January 2025, the game had been played by over 4 million players.

=== Sales ===
Lords of the Fallen sold over one million units in the first ten days since release. As of March 2026, the game has been sold over 2.5 million copies.

== Sequel ==
A sequel, Lords of the Fallen II, is scheduled to be released in 2027.
