= Crime Lab: Body of Evidence =

2010 video game

- European cover art
- Developer: City Interactive
- Publisher: City Interactive
- Platform: Nintendo DS
- Release: EU: October 1, 2010; NA: November 2, 2010
- Genre: Adventure
- Mode: Single-player

Crime Lab: Body of Evidence is a 2010 video game developed and published by City Interactive for the Nintendo DS. It is part of the Art of Murder series.

== Gameplay ==
The game centers around FBI agent Nicole Bonnet, who is assigned to investigate a serial killer that leaves a playing card at each crime scene. There are over 300 puzzles to solve. In addition to the main story mode, there is the minigames mode that contains all the minigames unlocked in the story mode, and crime scenes mode that involves finding hidden objects in a map. The game uses a point-and-click interface that is controlled with the stylus. Optionally, the d-pad can be used. The game is one of the few DS retail games that uses the DSi's camera in gameplay. For example, some sections require the player to turn a handle or wipe a dirty screen using the camera.

== Reception ==
Reception

Aggregate score
Aggregator	Score
Metacritic	53/100

Review scores
Publication	Score
Adventure Gamers	2/5
GameZone	4/10
Nintendo Life	7/10
Pocket Gamer	6/10
Just Adventure	A−

Adventure Gamers concluded: "[...] Crime Lab: Body of Evidence just isn't much fun, with its poorly constructed adventure elements and eye-rolling storyline." Pocket Gamer described the minigames as "a curious mix of average, baffling and plain tedious." The plot was said to contain "a pleasing amount of twists and turns". The game was recommended to fans of CSI. Just Adventure said the game "offers a lot of bang for your gaming buck". Nintendo Life wrote: "Overall, while it does have its flaws and the gameplay itself isn't terribly exciting, City Interactive have done well to create an enjoyable adventure game with Crime Lab: Body Of Evidence." GameZone said: "[...] the weak writing and otherwise plodding gameplay make it a mystery not worth tackling."
