= Art of murder =

Art of murder may refer to:

- "On Murder Considered as one of the Fine Arts", an 1854 essay by Thomas de Quincey
- Art of Murder, a video game series

== See also ==
- Thy Art Is Murder', Australian deathcore band
