= Metamorphosis (2020 video game) =

2020 adventure video game

- Developer: Ovid Works
- Publisher: All in! Games
- Composers: Garry Schyman; Mikolai Stroinski
- Platforms: PC; PlayStation 4; Xbox One; Nintendo Switch
- Release: 12 August 2020
- Genre: Adventure
- Mode: Single-player

Metamorphosis is an adventure video game with platforming elements, inspired by the imagination of Franz Kafka. The game was developed by Ovid Works and published by All in! Games on August 12, 2020. Metamorphosis is available on PC (Steam and GOG), PS4, Xbox One, and Nintendo Switch.

== Development ==
The game is based on Franz Kafka's literary work, including The Metamorphosis (1915) and The Trial (1925).

== Gameplay ==
The game is a first-person puzzle platformer in which players take the role of Gregor, a man who awakens after a hangover to find that he has been transformed into an insect. The game's setting is loosely based in the early 20th century. Gregor also learns that his friend Joseph has been arrested for unknown reasons.

== Reception ==
The game had a mixed critical reception. It currently has a score of 69 on Metacritic indicating "mixed or average" reviews. Fellow review aggregator OpenCritic assessed that the game received fair approval, being recommended by 48% of critics. Ewan Wilson of NME described the game's surreal atmosphere and focus on absurd bureaucracy to Terry Gilliam's 1985 film Brazil. Christopher Byrd, in a review for the Washington Post, described the game's humor and writing as a highpoint, but criticized the stiff character animations. Lara Arlotta of Eurogamer praised the game's use of Kafka's work, but criticized its technical flaws and lack of replay value. Alex Santa Maria of Screen Rant awarded the game 3 out of 5 stars, with praise for its visual design and gameplay but criticism for its story.

In 2021 the composers of the music for the game, Garry Schyman and Mikolai Stroinski, received the Society of Composers & Lyricists Award for Outstanding Original Score for Interactive Media, and two nominations for the Game Audio Network Guild Awards for Music of the Year and Best Music for an Indie Game. They employed expressionist techniques in their score, introducing twelve-tone rows, Sprechstimme vocal technique (singing-speaking hybrid) and angular melodies.
