= Age of Empires IV =

2021 video game

- Developers: Relic Entertainment; World's Edge
- Publisher: Xbox Game Studios
- Directors: Adam Isgreen; Quinn Duffy
- Producers: Michael Mann; Greg Wilson
- Designers: Christopher M. Rubyor; Michael Conkin; James Agay
- Programmers: Joel Pritchett; Wilfried Schmidt; Lawrence Ward
- Artists: Han Randhawa; Zach Schläppi; Roland Longpre; Brent Breedveld
- Writers: Noble Smith; Philippe Boulle
- Composers: Tilman Sillescu; Alexander Röder; Henning Nugel; Armin Haas; Mikolai Stroinski; Christian Wirtz; Nicolai Patricio; Dominik Morgenroth
- Series: Age of Empires
- Engine: Essence Engine 5.0
- Platforms: Windows; Xbox One; Xbox Series X/S; PlayStation 5
- Release: Windows; October 28, 2021; Xbox One, Series X/S; August 22, 2023; PlayStation 5; November 4, 2025
- Genre: Real-time strategy
- Modes: Single-player, multiplayer

Age of Empires IV is a 2021 real-time strategy video game developed by Relic Entertainment in partnership with World's Edge and published by Xbox Game Studios. It is the fourth installment of the Age of Empires series, the second set during the Middle Ages after Age of Empires II, and the first installment not developed by Ensemble Studios. The game was released on October 28, 2021 for Windows, August 22, 2023 for Xbox One and Xbox Series X/S, and on November 4, 2025 for PlayStation 5.

== Gameplay ==
=== Setting ===
The developer team states that the game is set during the Early Middle Ages to the early Renaissance, with the earliest appearance of any civilization being in the year 750. Gameplay is mostly similar to that of Age of Empires II.

=== Civilizations ===
There are 25 civilizations available in the game, with ten being available with the purchase of the base game, known as Age of Empires IV: Anniversary Edition, and six with The Sultans Ascend expansion, with four of the expansion civilizations being "variant civilizations" that are changed versions of other previously released civilizations. Two variant civilizations were added with Knights of Cross and Rose expansion, and four more were added with Dynasties of the East expansion. A variant civilization was added with Yue Fei's Legacy expansion. Two civilizations were added with Raiders of the North expansion.

There were eight civilizations available at the original release of the game. Two civilizations, the Ottomans and Malians, were added on 25 October 2022, a year after release, for free.

Civilizations in Age of Empires IV
Base roster	DLC
Abbasid Dynasty; Chinese; Delhi Sultanate; English; French; Holy Roman Empire; Mongols; Rus; Anniversary Update: Ottomans; Malians	The Sultans Ascend: Byzantines; Japanese; Variant civilizations: Ayyubids; Jeanne d'Arc; Order of the Dragon; Zhu Xi's Legacy; Knights of Cross and Rose: Variant civilizations: Knights Templar; House of Lancaster; Dynasties of the East: Variant civilizations: Golden Horde; Macedonian Dynasty; Sengoku Daimyo; Tughlaq Dynasty; Yue Fei's Legacy: Variant civilization: Jin Dynasty; Raiders of the North: Vikings; Scots

=== Campaigns ===
The game has seven single-player campaigns (two available with DLC):

- The Rise of a King (exclusive to console versions): a tutorial campaign, focusing on the basics of the game (1047–1066)
- The Normans: about the Norman conquest of England and conflicts of subsequent English kings (1066–1217)
- The Hundred Years War: a conflict between England and France (1351–1450)
- The Rise of Moscow: about the rise of Grand Duchy of Moscow amongst other Rus' principalities, Lithuania and the Tatars (1238–1552)
- The Mongol Empire: expansion of one of the largest empires of all time (1223–1273)
- The Sultans Ascend: Crusades from the perspective of the Muslims (1111–1426) - available with the DLC
- Yue Fei's Legacy: about the Jin–Song wars (1127–1140) - available with the DLC

=== Ages ===
The game features four Ages, the same as those in Age of Empires II — Dark Age, Feudal Age, Castle Age, and Imperial Age. Advancing through Ages does not happen at the Town Center (except for Knights Templar) but by constructing Landmarks.

=== Buildings ===
Most civilizations have the same roster of buildings:

- Economic - Farm, House, Lumber Camp, Mill, Mining Camp, Market, Town Center
- Military - Archery Range, Barracks, Dock, Siege Workshop, Stable
- Technology - Blacksmith, University/Madrasa
- Defensive - Keep, Outpost, Palisade Wall, Palisade Gate, Stone Wall, Stone Wall Gate, Stone Wall Tower
- Religious - Monastery, Mosque, Prayer Tent
- Wonder

Civilizations have replacement buildings which fill the same role differently and are available to only that civilization. They may also have unique buildings.

==== Landmarks ====
In addition, every civilization with the exception of the Abbasid Dynasty, Ayyubids, Golden Horde, and Knights Templar have four landmarks (the starting town center plus one each in Feudal, Castle, and Imperial Ages). Each landmark constructed to advance to the next age is special in its own way and is chosen from a selection of two.

The Chinese and Zhu Xi's Legacy are unique in that they can build both of their landmarks to enable a Dynasty. The Abbasid Dynasty, Ayyubids, and Golden Horde can build a single landmark, the House of Wisdom or Golden Tent respectively, with advancement to the next age being researched in through that landmark building. Knights Templar are also unique in having only a single landmark, the starting town center, being the only civilization to advance to the next age via researching it in their starting town center.

== Development ==
On August 21, 2017, Microsoft announced Age of Empires IV, developed by Relic Entertainment. Microsoft's Executive Vice-president of Gaming, Phil Spencer, confirmed on June 11, 2019, that Age of Empires IV was still in development, with more information coming later in 2019. On November 14, 2019, gameplay footage of Age of Empires IV was shown at the X019 event. It showed medieval warfare between English and Mongol forces. On March 16, 2021, the fan preview was released, showing more detailed gameplay and also including the two other known civilizations, the Chinese and the Delhi Sultanate. Microsoft announced at E3 2021 that the game will be released on Game Pass for PC on October 28, 2021. The game released on October 28, 2021, having been developed using the Essence Engine.

== Soundtrack ==
The game's voiceovers were recorded using historical pronunciation of each language. In-game music was written by Dynamedion composers Tilman Sillescu (main theme, menu music, trailers, Mongols, Holy Roman Empire), Alexander Röder (Chinese, English, Ottomans), Henning Nugel (Rus', Abbasid, Malians, Byzantines), Armin Haas (Delhi Sultanate, Malians), Christian Wirtz (Ottomans, Byzantines), Nicolai Patricio (Japanese), Dominik Morgenroth (Japanese) and also Mikolai Stroinski (French). The soundtrack is also available as part of the additional content of the Digital Deluxe Edition on Steam.

== Expansions ==
Release timeline Age of Empires IV release history
2022	One-Year Anniversary
2023	The Sultans Ascend
2024
2025	Knights of Cross and Rose
2025	Dynasties of the East
2026	Yue Fei’s Legacy
2026	Raiders of the North

The game received a free expansion with its one-year anniversary update on 25 October 2022, which added two new civilizations, the Ottomans and Malians.

A second expansion, titled The Sultans Ascend, was released on 14 November 2023, including two new civilizations, the Byzantines and Japanese, in addition to four variant civilizations which feature Jeanne d'Arc, the Order of the Dragon, Zhu Xi, and the Ayyubids, and a new 8-mission campaign.

A third expansion, titled Knights of Cross and Rose, was released on 8 April 2025, including two new variant civilizations, namely Knights Templar and House of Lancaster, and a new singleplayer game mode Historical Battles.

A fourth expansion, titled Dynasties of the East, was released on 4 November 2025, including four new variant civilizations, namely Golden Horde, Macedonian Dynasty, Sengoku Daimyo and Tughlaq Dynasty, and a new roguelite singleplayer game mode The Crucible.

A fifth expansion, titled Yue Fei’s Legacy, was released on 7 May 2026, including a new variant civilization, the Jin Dynasty, and a new 8 mission campaign.

A sixth expansion, titled Raiders of the North, was released on 29 October 2026, featuring two new civilizations, the Vikings and Scots, and four new missions.

== Reception ==
Reception

Aggregate scores
Aggregator	Score
Metacritic	81/100
OpenCritic	82% recommend

Review scores
Publication	Score
Eurogamer	Recommended
Game Informer	8.25/10
GameRevolution	7.5/10
GameSpot	7/10
GamesRadar+	5/5
Hardcore Gamer	4/5
IGN	8/10
PC Gamer (US)	77/100
PCGamesN	8/10

The game received "generally favorable reviews" according to review aggregator Metacritic. Fellow review aggregator OpenCritic assessed that the game received strong approval, being recommended by 82% of critics.

IGN summed up their review by saying "Age of Empires 4 is an enjoyable RTS throwback that often plays it too safe, but excels when it doesn't." Rachel Weber of GamesRadar+ praised the variety of the civilizations, writing, "each has been meticulously designed to offer different gameplay experiences". Game Informer liked the history videos between missions, but criticized how the game didn't seem to innovate on the formula of its predecessor, feeling that Age of Empires IV "lacks any ambition to even gently jostle the standards set by Age of Empires II decades earlier". Hayes Madsen of CGMagazine summed up his 10/10 review by saying "Age of Empires IV is a bold and ambitious evolution of the series, and quite likely one of the best RTS games ever made."

The Washington Post enjoyed the campaign balancing describing it as how "Every battle feels like it could tip any way at any moment" and that there was a "magic to this design". VG247 felt that the game's commitment to historical accuracy set it apart from its strategy game peers "making Age of Empires 4 more than just another medieval combat simulator". PCGamesN's Ian Boudreau praised the Art of War tutorials, saying they were "hugely helpful for new players who want to understand the nuts and bolts of successful economy management".

Robert Zak of PC Gamer felt the distinct civilizations were the fourth entry's greatest triumph, calling "the visual and strategic" variety "one of the most significant evolutions in the series". He criticized how he felt the game whitewashed history, saying its "squeaky-clean presentation skirts around the ickier parts of history". Polygon felt the simplifications from Age of Empire II's mechanics benefited the game, saying that the changes led "its complications [to] come more from decision-making and strategy than from the minute details of mechanical plays". Darryn Bonthuys of GameSpot called the game "satisfying", praising the historically educational campaign as well as the uniqueness of the factions. He criticized the dated visuals and the lack of innovation regarding the standard Age of Empires formula, saying that the game "rarely ventures out of its comfort zone".

=== Awards and accolades ===
Age of Empires IV won the award for "Best Sim/Strategy Game" at The Game Awards 2021. It also won the award for "Strategy/Simulation Game of the Year" at the 25th Annual D.I.C.E. Awards.
