= Art of Murder: Cards of Destiny =

2010 video game

- Developer: City Interactive
- Publisher: City Interactive
- Director: Robert Ożóg
- Designers: Łukasz Pisarek; Robert Ożóg
- Programmer: Arkadiusz Sito
- Writer: Łukasz Pisarek
- Series: Art of Murder
- Platform: Windows
- Release: USA: February 23, 2010; UK: March 26, 2010
- Genre: Adventure
- Mode: Single-player

Art of Murder: Cards of Destiny (Polish: Art of Murder: Karty Przeznaczenia), also known as Art of Murder 3, is an adventure game developed and published by City Interactive in February 2010 and is the third installment in the Art of Murder series.

== Gameplay ==
Gameplay

The gameplay of Art of Murder 3, just like its predecessor, is linear, its in 3-D and have a third-person perspective. The player moves the character by clicking on locations shown in the main display; the scene will only crossfade when a character is finished with all the actions on the screen. Players can interact with specific objects on screens by clicking or dragging them, and NPCs. The player can use an in-game hint system, which is located on the bottom left corner of a screen (in a shape of question mark). The items are carried by the player, and can be combined with other items, when its possible. Unlike the previous version of the game, the player can rotate an object inside their inventory. The items return to their original position when dropped. The game has interactive cutscenes which will show up after a player will be done with the location, and before moving to a next one. To complete the game, the player must explore real life locations, such as the Bronx and Manhattan. The game is non-violent, however, the player can die in it. Before they die, the game saves their progress automatically, which means that if they die, they can start from their last save. Some game stages have a time limit as well, which, if they aren't completed, is punishable by the death of the player's character.

== Release ==
The release was originally scheluded for November 2009. The game was eventually released on February 23, 2010.

== Reception ==
Art of Murder: Cards of Destiny received average reviews, and holds an average of 57/100 on aggregate website Metacritic.

The game received 4.0 from GameZone, which mentioned that "looking at Wikipedia's 'wet paint' sign is more fun than listening to an atrocious dialogue."
