= Enemy Front =

2014 video game

- Developer: CI Games
- Publisher: CI Games
- Composers: Cris Velasco; Sean Hathaway
- Engine: CryEngine 3
- Platforms: Microsoft Windows, PlayStation 3, Xbox 360
- Release: NA: June 10, 2014; AU: June 12, 2014; EU: June 13, 2014
- Genre: First-person shooter
- Modes: Single-player, multiplayer

Enemy Front is a World War II-themed first-person shooter video game developed and published by CI Games for Microsoft Windows, PlayStation 3 and Xbox 360. The game was first announced in 2011 and was released in June 2014.

== Gameplay ==
Robert Hawkins is an American war correspondent who is caught up with various Resistance groups across Europe during the Second World War. Along the way he finds help in the form of a Norwegian commando, a German SOE agent, a femme fatale French Resistance fighter, and the Polish Home Army. The game is played through his flashbacks and will include real historical events, some of it highlighting Nazi atrocities committed in Europe. It also visits theatres of war, such as German-occupied Poland and Norway, which have remained largely untouched by mainstream western media and especially other World War II first-person shooters. The game has a large amount of focus put on the Warsaw Uprising, with almost half of the levels featuring it.

Text from the official website describes the game:

"...the first truly modern WW2 FPS, featuring stunning visuals, open-ended levels and a richly interactive combat experience that breaks out of the standard model of highly linear scripted FPS experiences, giving the player full freedom to own their playing style. Intense Combat, Sniping, Stealth and Sabotage – all are viable approaches for the player, maximizing player engagement and replayability. Against the visceral backdrop of breathtaking European locales, the player takes on the role of American war correspondent Robert Hawkins, as he fights hand in hand with Resistance Fighters opposing the Nazi juggernaut in France, Germany, Norway, and during the Warsaw Uprising."

== Multiplayer ==
The game features three modes – Deathmatch, Team Deathmatch and Radio Transmission. Originally, Stuart Black served as creative director of the game. During his tenure, the team was only focused on a single multiplayer mode called "Conquest", which they previewed. Conquest was a team based multiplayer mode where two teams work against one another to capture points in a corridor-like level.

== Development ==
The game was developed by Polish studio CI Games. It has had a long development cycle, first being announced in 2011. The game was originally set to be released in late 2012, but then delayed to early 2013. It moved to late 2013, then to spring 2014, before being released on June 10 in the United States, June 12 in Australia, and on June 13 in Europe. From its inception, Enemy Front has had many features added and cut, the most notable cuts being a large level based on the evacuation at Dunkirk, the removal of a customisable health system which allowed the player to choose between regenerating health or medical packs distributed around levels and the removal of the Lanchester submachine gun featured in several trailers and other promotional material, being touted as one of the game's "signature weapons". Stuart Black was the original producer/creative director of the game. The executive producer is now Steve Hart.

== Reception ==
Reception

Aggregate score
| Aggregator | Score |
|---|---|
| Metacritic | 55/100 |

Review scores
| Publication | Score |
|---|---|
| Eurogamer | 2/10 |
| GameSpot | 5/10 |
| IGN | 4.7/10 |

Enemy Front received mixed to negative reviews from critics, according to review aggregator Metacritic. It received a score of 5/10 from GameSpot and 4.7/10 from IGN, both criticizing the poor AI and stealth, but praising the graphics, multiplayer and sniper sections. Eurogamer gave Enemy Front a 2/10, saying there were simply too many flaws to overlook.
