= SAS: Secure Tomorrow =

2008 video game

- Developer: City Interactive
- Publisher: City Interactive
- Platform: Microsoft Windows
- Release: USA: September 30, 2008; RUS: December 25, 2008
- Genre: Tactical first-person shooter
- Modes: Single-player, multiplayer

SAS: Secure Tomorrow is a tactical first-person shooter video game for Microsoft Windows, developed and published by Polish company City Interactive in 2008.

== Storyline ==
The player is in command of two SAS units, the main goal of which is to secure the British government from terrorist threat. Meanwhile, a notorious criminal and leader of a terrorist group, escapes with his rescuers from a high security prison. The SAS team is on their toes, and in hot pursuit, to bring him and other terrorists to justice. The SAS team is chasing the fugitives in London, Iceland, and finally in an underground nuclear reactor, and rescuing hostages on the way.

== Reception ==
The game received middling reviews from such gaming sites as: IGN, who gave the game a score of 6.0 and quoted that the game is too easy, because it lacks variety of levels (12 in total).
