= Chronicles of Mystery: The Scorpio Ritual =

2008 video game

- Developer: City Interactive
- Publisher: City Interactive
- Series: Chronicles of Mystery
- Platform: Windows
- Release: USA: November 10, 2008; EU: November 11, 2008
- Genre: Adventure
- Mode: Single-player

Chronicles of Mystery: The Scorpio Ritual (Polish: Chronicles of Mystery: Rytuał Skorpiona) is a third-person adventure game for Windows, developed and published by City Interactive in 2008. It was followed by Chronicles of Mystery: The Tree of Life.

== Gameplay ==
Visual style and game interface

The gameplay of The Scorpio Ritual is linear, its in 3-D and in third-person perspective. The player moves the character by clicking on locations shown in the main display; the scene will only crossfade when a character is finished with all the actions on the screen. Players can interact with specific objects on screens by clicking or dragging them, and NPCs. The player can use an in-game hint system, which is located on the bottom left corner of a screen (in a shape of a magnifying glass). The items are carried by the player, some of which could be read, such as the book on Malta. The items return to their original position when dropped. The game have interactive cutscenes which will show up after a player will be done with the location, and before moving to a next one. To complete the game, the player must explore real life locations, such as; Malta, Gozo, Istanbul, and Vatican. The game is non-violent, has no "sudden death" moments, and is played on its own pace, since there is no time limit either.

== Plot ==
The game begins with Sylvie Leroux writing an article in Paris, and seeing a vision of Knights Templar. A person on the phone informs her that her uncle, an archaeologist, have gone missing. Sylvie packs up a suitcase and travels to Malta, not finding her uncle in his home. Then she travels to the archaeological site in Gozo, where, she believes, she might find her uncle. Upon entering the site, she discovered that the police have taken control of the site. Not only did they took control of the site, but they managed to take her uncle's house under control as well. She creates a fake ID and presents herself as a reporter. By chance, she finds 4 photographs with cubical-shaped stones on them, and two photos with Maltese shroud. She suspects that her uncle's disappearance has something to do with this. When she comes back from Gozo, Sylvie finds out that her uncle's house has been ransacked, but nothing is stolen. She also finds a note to James, that explains the breakup of Templars and Hospitallers. She then travels from Malta to Istanbul, Turkey, where she enters into an art gallery and talks to the art gallery director about the stones. But the gallery manager was a suspicious and unfriendly person, so she left. Sylvie is desperate to get the stones, that she suspects are located somewhere in the gallery. She sneaks through backyard into an attic, in which she finds boxes in which she suspects located the illegal merchandise, including the stones, of which photographs she has. She opens the boxes. In one of them she finds the Maltese shroud, and in the other she finds 4 cubical stones. But, as she was about to put them into her pocket, somebody hit her. The only thing she remembers is that the gallery manager was scolding her for something, and that the guards then kick her outside. She then travels to Vatican. The game ends with Sylvie's uncle being killed by trying to break up a gun fight, between James, and inspector Gronc, over the illumination beliefs.

== Reception ==
Reception

Aggregate score
Aggregator	Score
Metacritic	62%

The game received a rating of 3.7 (out of 5) from CheatCode Central, mentioning variety of environments, but at the same time lack of time being spent in a particular location, quoting: "The Scorpio Ritual features a large variety of locations and large environments, but each is still reasonably contained." A 7.0 from GameZone quoting next: "This is one of the nicest looking adventure games I’ve seen." And 7.5 from IGN, saying in its closing comments: "The Scorpio Ritual left me with nothing but a stunned expression and a heartache the like of which I haven't felt since 2007's Culpa Innata."

== Sources ==
- Chronicles of Mystery: The Scorpio Ritual on iWin
- Chronicles of Mystery: The Scorpio Ritual on Adventuregamers.com
