= Thronebreaker: The Witcher Tales =

2018 video game

- Developer: CD Projekt Red
- Publisher: CD Projekt
- Director: Mateusz Tomaszkiewicz
- Writer: Jakub Szamałek
- Composers: Marcin Przybyłowicz; Mikolai Stroinski; Piotr Adamczyk
- Series: The Witcher
- Engine: Unity
- Platforms: Windows; PlayStation 4; Xbox One; Nintendo Switch; iOS; Android
- Release: Windows; 23 October 2018; PlayStation 4, Xbox One; 4 December 2018; Nintendo Switch; 28 January 2020; iOS; 9 July 2020; Android; 17 June 2021
- Genres: Role-playing, digital card game
- Mode: Single-player

Thronebreaker: The Witcher Tales (Polish: Wojna Krwi: Wiedźmińskie Opowieści, meaning "War of Blood: The Witcher Tales") is a role-playing video game developed by CD Projekt Red. It is a spin-off of The Witcher video game franchise, and acts as the standalone single-player component for Gwent: The Witcher Card Game. Thronebreaker was released in October 2018 for Windows, on 4 December 2018 for PlayStation 4 and Xbox One, in January 2020 for Nintendo Switch, and in July 2020 for iOS, with the Android version released on 17 June 2021.

== Gameplay ==
In Thronebreaker's 30-hour-long campaign, the player takes the control of Queen Meve, the ruler of Lyria and Rivia, during the events of The Witcher books that precede The Witcher video game. As the leader of one of the northern kingdoms, Meve leads a small opposition force who must battle and build alliances to take the north back. The game has a system of choices and consequences that will shift the story (fully voice acted and narrated by an entity called Storyteller) in a different direction or affect the gameplay.

The game world consists of five regions never explored in The Witcher game franchise before: Rivia, Lyria, Angren, Mahakam and Lower Aedirn. Exploration happens across a number of large maps with an isometric perspective similar to Baldur's Gate. Queen Meve's army is represented by a customizable deck of cards and combat takes place in matches similar to "Gwent" with a few differences.

Each player takes a turn to play a single card from their hand, or pass and end their turn. Different cards have different values, some have special abilities that interact in many ways. Whoever has the highest total value on the board after both players hit pass wins the round. After a single round, all played cards are discarded and new cards are drawn instead. The goal is to win two of the three rounds.

Maintaining alliances is crucial to the gameplay. The hero cards are present only as long as allies are with Meve and will leave the deck as soon as they depart the party.

== Synopsis ==
=== Setting and characters ===
Set in the fantasy world of The Witcher, the game takes place entirely within the Continent, a northern region in the setting based on Slavonic mythology. The player takes the role of Queen Meve, widow and sole ruler of the sister nations of Lyria and Rivia, who finds her realms invaded by the armies of Nilfgaard, an imperialist nation from the south, in the onset of an enormous military conflict known as the "Great War", or the second Northern War. At the start of the game, not yet fully recovered from the previous Northern War are the Northern Kingdoms, these including Temeria, Redania, and Lyria and Rivia's neighbors, Kaedwen and Aedirn. Other locations visited in the game include the Dwarf kingdom of Mahakam and the swamp region of Angren.

Meve (Lucy Black), who rose to power after the death of her husband King Reginald, is considered an upstart ruler with little experience in governance but respected for her warrior spirit and skill in martial combat and battlefield tactics. At court, she is accompanied by her lieutenant Reynard Odo (Chris Porter), chief advisor Count Caldwell (Nigel Betts), and oldest son, Prince Villem (Matthew Durkan). Other characters that feature in the game include the thief Gascon (Liam Garrigan), the commander of the Nilfgaardian forces in the region Duke Ardal aep Dahy (Anthony Howell), King Demavend III of Aedirn (Ronan Vibert), and Clan-Chief Brouver Hoog of Mahakam (David Rintoul).

=== Plot ===
Returning from a summit of Northern rulers to debate on how to deal with the matter of Nilfgaard's aggression, Meve reaches Lyria after a long travel. She is met by Count Caldwell, who informs her that the nearby towns have been terrorized by a notorious bandit named Gascon. Meve defeats Gascon in battle and captures him alive, only to receive the news that the armies of Nilfgaard have crossed the river Yaruga and begun another invasion of the North. Meve immediately convenes a council of Rivian and Lyrian nobles to decide how to respond. Though favoring open warfare, Meve is overruled by Caldwell, who reveals that the aristocracy have reached an agreement with Duke Ardal aep Dahy for Rivia's and Lyria's immediate surrender. When Meve refuses, Caldwell has Meve arrested and detained, replacing her with her eldest son Prince Villem as the regent. Meve and the loyal captain Reynard are thrown in the dungeons, where Meve is unexpectedly freed by Gascon. The three flee Lyria and make way for Aedirn.

In Aedirn, Meve encounters the Aedirnian captain Black Rayla (Caroline Catz), and rescues her from the elven rebels known as the Scoia'tael, as well as the sorceress Isbel of Hagge (Susan Brown). They find Demavend under siege and assist in his escape from Aedirn, but with the Aedirnian forces defeated by Nilfgaard, Meve did not get the military support she had hoped for. Instead, Demavend advises her to travel to the Dwarf kingdom of Mahakam and gives her a leaden ring that will guarantee an audience with the Dwarf ruler, the Clan-Chief Brouver Hoog. In Mahakam, Meve encounters the Dwarf explorer Gabor Zigrin (Gordon Cooper) and gnomish inventor Barnabas Beckenbauer (Matthew Gravelle). Meve is granted her audience with Brouver, who at first rejects her pleas for assistance against Nilfgaard, but changes his mind after they are attacked by Scoia'tael and enlists a small company of Dwarf warriors for her aid.

Now with a sizable force of Lyrian loyalists, Gascon's marauders, and Dwarf warriors, Meve decides to strike at Nilfgaard directly and attack the forces commanded by Caldwell, currently garrisoned in the lowland county of Angren. In the swamps, Meve discovers the truth that both her chief advisors, Reynard and Gascon, are both traitors who have betrayed her to Nilfgaard: Reynard has been in secret correspondence with now-King Villem hoping to reconcile the two, while Gascon has been hoping to trade Meve's life for his own freedom. Both claim to be truly loyal to her; Meve can forgive or banish either or both. After reaching and killing Caldwell, Meve flees deeper into the swamp to avoid Nilfgaardian reinforcements, and enters the realm of a dangerous monster known as Gernichora, whom she kills. Unable to find an alternate way out of the swamp, Meve is forced to fight the reinforcing Nilfgaardian army in a hopeless frontal assault. During the battle, Meve receives the unexpected help of the witcher Geralt (Doug Cockle), who had also been attempting to find an escape from the swamps. The Nilfgaardian army is defeated, and after their victory Meve knights Geralt, thus granting him his "of Rivia" title.

Meve returns to Rivia as a liberator, meets with King Villem to discuss a possible parlay, and can either forgive him and thus gain him as an ally and heir, refuse to forgive him and maintain him as an enemy, or violate the terms of their meeting and have him captured and kept as a prisoner. Marching on to Rivia Castle, where Ardal is garrisoned with his army, Meve at first intends to lay siege to the keep but then learns from aep Dahy that another Nilfgaardian army is reinforcing and imminent. Meve realizes her only chance of victory is to storm the castle. Either Reynard or Gascon goes on a suicide mission to infiltrate the keep and open the gate and dies in the attempt, or Villem if he was allowed to leave the meeting as an enemy will sacrifice himself to open the gate, and Meve's army enters and defeats Ardal's force, though the Duke himself escapes. Meve is restored to rule over Rivia and Lyria, marking the turn of the tide of war against Nilfgaard.

Returning to Aedirn, Meve meets with Demavend and King Henselt of Kaedwen, preparing to face Ardal's army and decide the fate of the Northern Realms. Unexpectedly capturing a small Nilfgaardian force led by a man named Caldwyn, Meve discovers that Caldwyn is a messenger sent by the Emperor of Nilfgaard, Emhyr var Emreis, with secret orders forcing aep Dahy to poison himself as punishment for his failure to conquer the North. Meve allows Caldwyn to proceed with his mission, resulting in the death of Duke Ardal aep Dahy, and then the three rulers crush the Nilfgaardian army in Aedirn, thus ending the war. The narrator of the story, a man called the Storyteller, is then revealed to be Borch Three Jackdaws (Timothy Watson), who finishes the tale by recounting the fates of Meve and all of her companions gained throughout this journey.

== Release ==
Thronebreaker was initially conceived as a single-player campaign expansion for Gwent: The Witcher Card Game, but repurposed as a standalone game in August 2018. It was released on 23 October 2018 for Windows and on 4 December 2018 for PlayStation 4 and Xbox One. A Nintendo Switch version was released on 28 January 2020. An iOS version was released on 9 July 2020, with an Android version originally scheduled for release later in 2020, An Android version was planned for release later in 2020, but the actual release was pushed to June 17, 2021.

== Reception ==
Reception

Aggregate score
Aggregator	Score
Metacritic	PC: 85/100; PS4: 80/100; XONE: 85/100; NS: 84/100 iOS: 80/100

Review scores
Publication	Score
Game Informer	8.5/10
GameSpot	9/10
GamesRadar+	5/5
IGN	9.4/10
PC Gamer (US)	81/100
TouchArcade	4/5
The Games Machine	9.2/10
Slant Magazine	4/5

Thronebreaker: The Witcher Tales received "generally favorable" reviews, according to review aggregator Metacritic.

The game did not meet the sales expectations of CD Projekt Red because of GOG.com's small audience at the time.

=== Accolades ===
Year	Award	Category	Nominee(s)	Result	Ref.
2018	Global Game Awards	Best Story	Thronebreaker: The Witcher Tales	Won	
2018	IGN's Best of 2018	Best PC Game of 2018 (People's Choice)	Thronebreaker: The Witcher Tales	Won	
2018	IGN's Best of 2018	Best Strategy Game	Thronebreaker: The Witcher Tales	Nominated	
2018	SA Gamer Awards	Best Puzzle	Thronebreaker: The Witcher Tales	Won	
2018	Unity Awards	Best Desktop / Console Game	Thronebreaker: The Witcher Tales	Nominated	
2018	PC World Editor's Choice Awards	Best Game of the Year	Thronebreaker: The Witcher Tales	Nominated	
2018	PC World Editor's Choice Awards	Best Single Player	Thronebreaker: The Witcher Tales	Won	
2019	New York Game Awards	Herman Melville Award for Best Writing	Thronebreaker: The Witcher Tales	Nominated	
2019	Game Informer's Best of 2018	Biggest Surprise	Thronebreaker: The Witcher Tales	Won	
2019	RPG France Awards	RPG éditeur	Thronebreaker: The Witcher Tales	Won	
2019	Deutscher Computerspielpreis	Audience Award	Thronebreaker: The Witcher Tales	Won	
2019	Digital Dragons Awards	Best Polish Game	Thronebreaker: The Witcher Tales	Nominated	
2019	Digital Dragons Awards	Best Polish Game Design	Thronebreaker: The Witcher Tales	Nominated	
2019	Digital Dragons Awards	Best Polish Game Art	Thronebreaker: The Witcher Tales	Nominated	
2019	Digital Dragons Awards	Best Polish Game Soundtrack	Marcin Przybyłowicz, Mikolai Stroinski and Piotr Adamczyk	Won	
2019	Central & Eastern European Game Awards	Best Narrative	Thronebreaker: The Witcher Tales	Won	
