= Chronicles of Mystery: The Tree of Life =

2009 video game

- Chronicles of Mystery The Tree of Life cover
- Developer: City Interactive
- Publisher: City Interactive
- Producer: Artur Falkowski
- Designers: Łukasz Pisarek; Danuta Sienkowska
- Writer: Łukasz Pisarek
- Series: Chronicles of Mystery
- Platform: Windows
- Release: USA: December 10, 2009; EU: November, 2010
- Genre: Adventure
- Mode: Single-player

Chronicles of Mystery: The Tree of Life (Polish: Chronicles of Mystery: Drzewo Życia) is the second game in the series of adventure games for PC, after Chronicles of Mystery: The Scorpio Ritual. The game was developed and published by City Interactive in 2009.

== Gameplay ==
Visual style and game interface

The gameplay of The Tree of Life is linear, its in 3-D and in third-person perspective. The player moves the character by clicking on locations shown in the main display; the scene will only crossfade when a character is finished with all the actions on the screen. Players can interact with specific objects on screens by clicking or dragging them, and NPCs. The player can use an in-game hint system, which is located on the bottom left corner of the screen (in a shape of a magnifying glass). The items are carried by the player, the items return to their original position when dropped. The game has interactive cutscenes which will show up after a player is done with the location, and before moving to a next one. To complete the game, the player must explore real life locations, such as; Venice, Brittany, Cairo and Gibraltar. The game is largely nonviolent with unlimited time to solve the puzzles; and although the protagonist Sylvie Leroux does not engage in violence herself, there is however one scene in the game in which she must trap an assassin within a given time limit or else she will be slain by a poisoned dart.

== Plot ==
The game starts off with people wearing masks gathering to discuss an assassination, who will carry it out, and who will be the victim. As they conclude, Marcel, one of the owners of a castle is the target. The leader of the assassination ring, shoots a poison dart at Marcel, who falls, as soon as he receives it. His wife who was with him saw him falling, but didn't know how it happened. Meantime, our heroine, Sylvie Leroux turns out to be in the same city where the assassination took place, and begins to investigate. The owner of the castle tells her that Marcel died after an accident, caused probably by love, a heart attack, as his wife, Claire, describes it. But Sylvie has her own take on it. The investigation leads her from Brittany to Venice, Cairo, and Gibraltar.

=== Brittany ===
Sylvie Leroux starts her investigation in Brittany, which was a stop-by city. Her real destination was Venice, where she was scheduled to carry on a lecture about her book, "The Scorpio Ritual". In Brittany she finds a chest that was a key part in "Mary Celeste" mystery. Also, she finds notes about a strange collector nicknamed "Saint-Germain", who is also a count of some kind.

=== Venice ===
When she arrived to Venice she meets a gondolier, but right in front of her eyes he was assassinated by a masked figure. Sylvie finds a chronometer, and a coin (a murder mark), next to the body. She thoroughly examines the chronometer and finds out that it dates to 1872, the year that "Mary Celeste" sunk. Due to the murder the lecture was canceled, but she managed to sign the book and give it to a couple of carnival-goers, which she met outside, who wanted to come for a lecture and book signing. After she left them she saw the same figure on the bridge, (the same figure that killed Marcel), and got terrified. She avoided the confrontation with him by traveling on a gondola, under the darkness and a flare, which she made to distract the figure. After a successful distraction, she manages to flee the place unnoticed.

She lands her gondola at a garden which is a property of that mysterious collector. The collector and Sylvie introduce each other, and then Sylvie gives him her find, the chronometer. She mentions of a date of sinking to him which is on the chronometer. Saint-Germain then wants Sylvie to bring him the chest, but she can't do it because it is a property of a museum now. After an argument they came to a deal: She will work for him, and she will get more than a half objects that they will excavate together. However it seems they are not alone, three times the Count hesitates, believing he heard something, and on the third occasion, the masked figure from the bridge pops up at the window. Saint-Germain mentioned something about a collector in Cairo, who is specializes in Atlantis. He doesn't remember his name due to amnesia, that was caused by an accident. Sylvie takes a flight to Cairo, in search of that collector.

=== Cairo ===
As soon as she arrives to Cairo, she gets robbed at the airport. And, without passport, she have a hard time finding a proper hotel. She finds one that is owned by 11-year-old boy, Ali. The boy, generously enough, lends her a room for free. She agrees with it, and puts her copy of a jug piece and map behind a mirror. After that she leaves on an adventure to find a collector. She finds an antiquarian, not a collector. She talks with him. The antiquarian tells her that he got a scarf on his neck, and that it covered in blood, he wants you to wash it. Sylvie takes the scarf, picks a lemon from a tree, by using a camel and a whip, and goes back to the room. In there she washes the scarf. It turned out that the scarf carries sinking date (1872) of Mary Celeste. Besides the date it also carries the map and a tree of life emblem. She then returns the scarf to antiquarian. She also goes to a cafe, which is not far away from her room. In there she talks to the cafe keeper, who tells her that is a woman who wants to talk to her. Sylvie agrees and go into a room behind a curtain. There, she meets a woman of middle-eastern nationality, named Fatima. Fatima suggests to play a game, after which, if Sylvie wins, Fatima will tell her about the jug and collector. Sylvie wins, and received a response about a collector. It turns out that the collector is her husband! She also says that she can't talk much because somebody is watching them. Sylvie returns to a hotel room and found Fatima in there. Sylvie wanted to barricade the door because she is afraid that Fatima would be killed, but there was no point in it. Both ladies fall asleep, but Sylvie was awoken by Saint-Germain, who told her that Fatima is dead. Sylvie started to ask questions, but count Saint-Germain tells her to ask all of it later, instead, pack your stuff and travel with me to Gibraltar, on his yacht.

=== Gibraltar ===
In the yacht Sylvie got an impression that it might be him who kills people in front of her. Considering that the count mentions to her that he took the jug from Fatima when she died, even though his idea was to buy it from her. Since Fatima is dead, he decided to obtain jug for free. Sylvie gets nervous, and, while the count is asleep, or at least she thinks that, after having added some sleeping pills in his tea, dials police over a dispatcher. She knocks on the count's door after it, and it turns out that he is not asleep. Suddenly, Sylvie remembers that the count mentioned about a gun that he apparently keeps in his room. Sylvie needs to distract him somehow. So, she goes to a control panel, and changes the course. After that, she awakens the count. While the count was messing with the controls, Sylvie snuck in and got a gun. After that she went to the control panel, and, by gun pointing at the count asked him to raise with hands up. After a brief discussion it turned out that he did not kill anybody, and he wasn't using Sylvie for an item gain (chronometer, chest, map, jug). As soon as the yacht was parked in Gibraltar, the police arrested the count.

While he was interrogated by police, Sylvie tried to convince the cops that she made a mistake. The cops wouldn't let her leave with him. She remembered though, that the count had plenty of medications on his yacht, without which he won't survive even a minute in a cell, if he would be put in there. While she was looking for a medication, an intruder snicked into Saint-Germain's room. Sylvie sees a cane on the opposite side of the door, and locks the intruder in, by using it and a tie it with the rope, on the door. After that she alarms the police by running into a police department. In there, she gives a medication to an officer, which turned out to be unnecessary, because the count got cleared out of any wrongdoing. She also mentions about intruder, on which police got "enlighted", considering how rare crime is happening on the island.

The cops told Sylvie to wait for them with the count, because they need to give them the release papers. While police is trying to get the thug out of the yachts room, Sylvie suggests the count to leave with her. The count is willing to do that, so they flee. While they were on the run, they saw the face of intruder, who was walking in handcuffs, with a cop from each side. The intruder was the same masked man that Sylvie saw in Venice, and the same one that was "spying" on her in Cairo. But where would they go? Every door on the island is locked!

Sylvie remembers that on the evening the count got arrested, she went to the cemetery, to look for the grave of a captain Benjamin Briggs. Before going in, she saw a woman walking out of the same gate she was about to enter. She enters a police station, and, while they are absent, uses a fishing poll to get a parcel, which is laying on the other side of the table. The parcel, as it turned out was sent to that woman, address of whom was provided below. She copies the address into her diary, and goes to it.

Unfortunately, the passage to a house is being guarded by a bulldog. Of course, she doesn't want to jump over the fence, fearing that the dog would attack her. So, she thought of an idea, she decides to uses canned meat that she borrowed from the yacht while searching for counts medication. She throws opened canned meat over one side of the fence, while running and jumping over the other side. After she jumps over, she shuts the gate and locks it with a big ring, by putting it over the handles. As soon as the gate gets secured, she knocks on the woman's door. The woman opens the door, and introduces herself. Sarah is her name. After introduction Sylvie asks her about the map, which count Saint-Germain mentioned that she have. Sarah didn't deny that. Sarah told Sylvie her version of Briggs story, Sylvie then, told her her version, and as a result they forget about the map. Sarah mentions about an airship in a hangar, which she would like to sell to the count for $1,000,000. The count asks Sylvie to run to the yacht and open the safe, in which he keeps his fortune. Sylvie takes the money from the safe, and returns to the hangar, where Sarah and count Saint-Germain are waiting for her. As soon as she is paid off, she and the count are bound to an island on which the Tree of Life is believed to be growing. The island is located in a Bermuda Triangle.

=== Island ===
They landed in a jungle of an island. There they met a local tribes man, who told them where to find the tree. But he warned them of danger of not enough juice that you can make out of fruits that the tree can provide, variety of which are limited. They started making a juice out of collected fruits, but before they finished with it, they got apprehended by the just-came-in a man and a woman. It turned out they were the same people that were behind the assassinations of so many people! The man and a woman introduce themselves as Beta and Alpha, and called the count Omega. They explained that they are the descendants of Benjamin Briggs. Not only that, but all three of them (Alpha, Beta, and Omega), served on the same ship, the day it got sunk. They claim that they are the survivors of the sinking of "Mary Celeste" in 1872! Not only that, but it turns out that the trio is also the keepers of the tree, and call themselves The Tree of Life Brotherhood. They wanted Sylvie to join, but she of course, doesn't believe it, and get very suspicious about the whole story. The count commands her then to finish making the elixir of life out of the fruit from the tree. She obeys, otherwise she has no options. As soon she finishes with it, Alpha and Beta put her and the count into a big cage, that was used by natives to keep their prisoners. They called out the native and ask him to free them. He agrees to free them on one condition: They will protect the tree from destruction. The count mentions that he left the gun on the airship, and Sylvie is getting it. After they found a gun, they returned to the potion maker, and caught their enemies by surprise. Alpha and Beta were about to drink a potion when they get distracted by sudden appearance of Sylvie and Omega. A problem arises that there is only enough of the potion for 2 people and that the law of the brotherhood says that those who do not get the potion must die so as not to reveal the secret to the outside world. The game ends with an apparent betrayal of trust by the count who chooses Beta over Sylvie, in the final cut scene while the count is still arguing with Alpha over who gets the potion, Sylvie destroys the vessel that creates the potion, thus ending the matter once and for all. None of the characters are killed, but none of them get what they longed for the most: Immortality. Which is believed to be given by a Tree of Life. Sylvie walks away from a scene into a mist...

== Reception ==
The game received a 68 from six critical reviews on Metacritic, signaling mixed or average opinions. The game received a score of 8.0 from Worthplaying: writing, "...and while the dialogue is not the best, the overall plot is quite intriguing". The game also received a 5.0 score from GameZone, commenting on the great soundtrack, but mentioning of the improvements quoting, "The game could’ve benefited from the game’s various exotic locations and interesting “Fountain of Youth' premise. Unfortunately, the weak script and lacking puzzles make this an adventure that is ultimately hard to recommend."

== Sources ==
- Chronicles of Mystery: The Tree of Life on GameBorder
- Chronicles of Mystery: The Tree of Life Trailer
