= Sniper: Ghost Warrior (video game) =

2010 video game

- North American cover art
- Developer: City Interactive
- Publisher: City Interactive
- Director: Michał Sokolski
- Producers: Łukasz Janczuk; Mikołaj Pawłowski; Michał Sroczyński
- Designers: Paweł Pieńkowski; Kamil Włodarek; Patryk Duch
- Programmer: Krzysztof Jakubowski
- Artist: Damian Zieliński
- Writer: Brian Shields
- Composers: Max Lade; Matias Puumala; Gerhard Daum
- Series: Sniper: Ghost Warrior
- Engine: Chrome Engine 4
- Platforms: Windows, Xbox 360, PlayStation 3
- Release: Windows & Xbox 360: NA: 29 June 2010; EU: 2 July 2010; AU: 22 July 2010; PlayStation 3: AU: 5 June 2011; EU: 6 June 2011; NA: 28 June 2011
- Genres: Tactical shooter, stealth
- Modes: Single-player, multiplayer

Sniper: Ghost Warrior is a 2010 tactical shooter video game developed and published by City Interactive for Microsoft Windows, Xbox 360 and PlayStation 3. It is the second entry in the Sniper: Ghost Warrior series and is the sequel to Sniper: Art of Victory.

The game is based on the role of the military sniper. The player takes on the role of an elite sniper team sent into a hostile area in an attempt to help the rebels of Isla Trueno, a fictitious Latin American country, fight against the force who has toppled their government in a coup d'état.

== Gameplay ==
The game is a tactical shooter played from a first-person perspective. As the title suggests, a large portion of the game consists of stealth, staking out targets and firing sniper rifles. As is the case with Sniper Elite, the game incorporates the element of realistic ballistics. Bullet trajectories are subject to wind strength, gravity, breathing and flight time, all of which players must account for when taking shots. To simplify this procedure, easier difficulty settings contain indicators that highlight enemies and show precisely where a bullet will hit.

The main weapons used in the game are silenced pistols, knives and various types of sniper rifles. In missions that are played with characters who are not snipers, the stealth aspect is dropped in favor of faster-paced "run and gun" scenarios. An exception to this are spotting missions, in which the primary objective consists of marking targets for a computer-controlled sniper character.

Most of the game takes place in a dense jungle environment. Waypoint overlays at all times display the correct routes through the areas players must traverse. While these routes need not be followed exactly, the level design usually ensures an overall linear path due to obstacle placement and invisible walls. Many waypoints trigger scripted mission events, and some waypoints act as checkpoints, which automatically save the game.

The single player campaign of Sniper: Ghost Warrior is made up of four separate acts, each of which deals with a different conflict. All acts are split up into various missions, which usually depict the same event from different points of view. For example, in one segment players may be participating in an infantry assault on an enemy camp, while the next segment has them assuming the role of a supporting sniper who backs up the assault. There is downloadable content available for the title that seamlessly continues the story line with three additional campaign missions and a challenge mission following those.

== Plot ==
In the game, players take the role of various characters for different missions. Among them are a sniper, Sergeant Tyler "Razor Six-Four" Wells, for long range missions and stealth assignments, a Delta Force operator, Private Anderson, as well as a rebel leader, El Tejon, for missions involving direct firefights. The main plot involves a highly trained special ops unit that is sent into the fictional country of Isla Trueno, whose democratic government has been overthrown by a hostile force.

Undercover CIA Agent Mike Rodriguez infiltrates the entourage of General Vasquez in order to set up a shot for the sniper-spotter team Alpha Nine. Killing the general would put an end to the regime on Isla Trueno. During the assassination attempt, Agent Rodriguez is compromised and captured, and General Vasquez escapes. After a series of missions, the assault team Delta Three, supported by sniper unit Razor Six Four, manages to free Agent Rodriguez from an enemy camp.

With Vasquez on the loose, Delta Three and Razor Six-Four are sent to set up an air strike on a cocaine plantation. After the successful destruction of the plantation, the evacuation chopper comes under attack and has to leave. Razor Six Four makes his way through enemy territory in order to reach the new evacuation point from where he is extracted.

Agent Rodriguez teams up with Sergeant Tyler Wells to steal plans of a nuclear warhead from an enemy camp. The mission is a success, but Agent Rodriguez turns out to be a traitor. He takes the data and leaves Sergeant Wells to be shot by the enemy. A rebel leader called El Tejon rescues Sergeant Wells, who then tracks down Rodriguez, kills him and retrieves the data.

Because the data files are incomplete, the Alpha Nine sniper-spotter team steals the rest of the data from the enemy. Together with Razor Six Four, Alpha Nine then eliminates Ernesto Salazar, General Vasquez' advisor. Decryption of the stolen data uncovers the location of a secret uranium mine on Isla Trueno. Delta Three and Razor Six-Four enter the mine facilities in an enemy truck, free the civilian workers and destroy the compound. To fully dissolve the now weakened regime, a second attempt is made to kill General Vasquez. Razor Six-Four completes the assignment successfully, and the game ends the moment Vasquez is struck by the bullet.

== Development ==
The game engine renders dense jungles.

Sniper: Ghost Warrior takes advantage of the Chrome Engine, which had previously been used on Techland's Call of Juarez: Bound in Blood. The engine renders lush jungles with large draw distances. Several missions in the game take place during rainfall or nighttime, and various types of animals, such as crocodiles or cows, populate the tropical environment.

The artificial intelligence of enemies attempts to simulate a human field of vision. This allows players to crawl through tall grass or hide behind bush without being spotted.

== Reception ==
Reception

Aggregate score
Aggregator	Score
Metacritic	PC: 55/100; PS3: 53/100; X360: 45/100

Review scores
Publication	Score
GameRevolution	1/5
GameSpot	X360: 6.0/10; PC: 5.5/10
IGN	PC/X360: 5.0/10; PS3: 4.5/10
VideoGamer.com	3/10

Sniper: Ghost Warrior received "mixed or average" and "generally unfavorable" reviews, according to review aggregator website Metacritic.

GameSpot gave the Xbox 360 version a 6.0/10 and the PC version a 5.5/10, praising the game's visuals and satisfying sniper cams, but criticizing the game's absurd difficulty in some areas particularly the enemy AI "that ranges from mindless to so magical it can spot you instantly".

IGN gave the PC and Xbox 360 version a 5.0/10, praising the game's sniping mechanics but criticising the game's design and running-and-gunning scenarios. They gave the PlayStation 3 version a lower score of 4.5/10, stating that it looks and runs worse, and fails to address the hyper-linear level design that doomed the original release to the bargain bin.
