= Gwent: The Witcher Card Game =

2018 video game

- Developer: CD Projekt Red
- Publisher: CD Projekt
- Directors: Benjamin Lee; Katarzyna Redesiuk; Jason Slama; Vladimir Tortsov
- Designers: Michał Dobrowolski; Maciej Ostrowski
- Composers: Mikołaj Stroinski; Marcin Przybyłowicz
- Series: The Witcher
- Engine: Unity
- Platforms: Windows; PlayStation 4 (Note: Support discontinued in June 2020); Xbox One; iOS; Android; macOS
- Release: 23 October 2018: Windows; 23 October 2018; PlayStation 4, Xbox One; 4 December 2018; iOS; 29 October 2019; Android; 24 March 2020; macOS; 9 April 2021
- Genre: Collectible card game
- Modes: Single-player, multiplayer

Gwent: The Witcher Card Game (Note: Gwint: Wiedźmińska Gra Karciana in Polish) is a 2018 digital collectible card game by CD Projekt. It was released free-to-play first for Windows, PlayStation 4, and Xbox One in 2018, and for iOS in 2019, Android in 2020, and macOS in 2021. Gwent's name is derived from the card game of the same name featured in Andrzej Sapkowski's The Witcher novels and playable in The Witcher 3: Wild Hunt video game. A standalone single-player expansion, Gwent: Rogue Mage, released in 2022 to mixed reception.

== Gameplay ==
In-game screenshot, prior to the release of the Homecoming Update

Gwent is a turn-based card game between two players that can last two to three rounds. Players play one card each turn from a hand of 10 cards, chosen from a deck of 25. Each deck belongs to one of six factions that offer different play styles. In contrast to The Witcher 3: Wild Hunt's variation of Gwent, the Siege row is removed, leaving two rows where cards can be played: the Melee and Ranged rows.

The goal is to win two of three rounds by playing cards to gain points called "power" on the board. Each card has a certain power (which can be boosted or reduced), resulting in the player's points being the total of all of their cards. A player wins a round by having more points on board than their opponent. Each card can potentially have multiple special abilities, such as the ability to damage other units on deployment, boost other units' point value, spawn other units when given conditions are met, trigger an effect when destroyed, and lock another card's ability. Rounds end when either both players pass to the next round, or when both players run out of cards. The first to win two out of three rounds wins the game.

Each deck is built with a chosen faction combined with a unique leader ability. The deck will have a 150 Provision Limit plus the Provision the leader adds on. A minimum of 25 cards is required, with at least 13 of those being unit cards that are played on the field and have power (as opposed to special/artifact cards which are discarded upon use or remain on the field with no power). Each card has a Provision Cost, and only neutral cards and cards from the selected faction can be added to a deck. Decks are made up of bronze cards, which the player can have two copies of in their collection and deck, and gold cards, of which players can only own one copy.

Round wins go toward daily quests and Gwent's battle pass system, Journey. Rewards include crafting materials for cards and card packs, or "kegs," which can also be purchased through microtransactions. Each keg contains five cards, with the first four being of lower rarity and the fifth being of higher rarity and selected from a spread of three cards. Players can also craft the animated, or Premium, versions of their cards. Using the "Good Game" button after matches also rewards crafting materials. Players are also awarded currency which can unlock nodes in the Reward Book, which unlocks cosmetics like avatars and other crafting materials or currency for kegs.

The game features several modes of gameplay. Ranked Play matches players of similar rank and allows them to progress and regress through tiers, while Casual Play allows players to be matched against anyone without loss penalties. Ranked takes place across a month-long season where players aim to increase in rank for better end-of-season rewards. Player ranks work on a numerical system from 1-30, with a new player starting at rank 30. A player ranks up after accumulating 5 wins (or "Mosaic Pieces"), with a loss lowering the win counter by 1. Win streaks are available until rank 7. After ranking up from rank 1, players achieve 'Pro Rank', the entry point of Gwent Official Competitive Play, with invites to Gwent Open qualifiers for players in the top 64 of the Pro Rank Leaderboard. At the end of each monthly season, players de-rank by two from their current standing (ex. going from rank 7 to rank 9). This also applies for Pro Rank, where if players do not finish within the top 500, they will be reset to Rank 3 for the next season.

The level system works on a numerical scale of 1-60, with no effect on ranking or matchmaking. Players automatically "prestige" after reaching level 60, which grants them permanent account rewards such as guaranteeing a rare card within the first 4 cards of a keg. Players can currently level up to Prestige 10. Certain gamemodes are locked behind a level requirement, such as the rotating seasonal mode requiring level 10 to play.

Players are also assigned a matchmaking rating for each faction, which respectively increases or decreases as a player wins and loses games. When entering Pro Rank, this rating is set to a base of 2400 for all factions. A general matchmaking rating (used for leaderboard ranking) is then calculated from the average of their 4 best performing factions where they have played at least 25 matches for a faction to be considered at 100% of its rating, with the faction rating being used being their peak rating for that faction.

=== Thronebreaker ===
A standalone, single-player campaign mode, Thronebreaker: The Witcher Tales, was also released alongside Gwent. Combat in the video game Thronebreaker: The Witcher Tales is in the form of a card-battle game similar to Gwent, but slightly different. Owning Thronebreaker itself provides some premium cards in Gwent (which can be crafted regardless), and Gwent contains multiple Contracts with rewards varying from Reward Keys to cosmetics and titles based on Thronebreaker progress.

=== Rogue Mage ===
A single-player roguelike deck-building expansion titled Gwent: Rogue Mage was released for Windows, macOS, iOS, and Android on 7 July 2022. The game combines roguelike, deckbuilding, and strategy elements with the mechanics of Gwent card battles.

== Development and release ==
The game had an estimated 100 staff members working on it. Following an open beta release in May 2017, it was officially released for Windows in October 2018, and was released for PlayStation 4 and Xbox One on December 4, 2018.

Accompanying each monthly season comes a "Monthly Patch" where balance changes and potential additional cards are released, including outside of expansions.

In March 2019, CD Projekt Red announced that Gwent would be launching on mobile devices later that year. Jason Slama, the game's director, said that the team's vision for bringing the game to them combined the best they had to offer both in terms of "graphics and gameplay". It released for iOS on October 29, 2019 and Android on March 24, 2020.

Support for the PlayStation 4 and Xbox One versions of the game was ended in June 2020. This is largely believed to be due to the fact that the console version of Gwent made up 3% of total Gwent revenue according to CD Projekt's 2019 Financial Report. The ability to "copy" over account progress and cards with currencies was available for a 6 month period, but only to a GOG account with no progress in Gwent. It featured cross-platform play between the PC and console versions, although platform play between the console versions was not supported. In May 2020, the game was released on Steam. In April 2021, the game was released for Apple M1 Macs.

=== End of official support ===
CD Projekt Red announced that support for Gwent will wind down at the end of 2023. The team said that they were close to implementing every card idea that they had for the game, and felt it was best to shift to maintenance mode from 2024 on, with support from the community. Community supports entailing voting on up to 30 changes per month in various categories, with a patch automatically being produced. However, changes are only limited to card power and provision, with no ability to modify any card text, numbers within cards, nor card effects. Likewise, the community is unable to create any new cards.

Speculated reasons for end of support include the fact that the game had limited growth whilst balancing increasing complexity and lower development staffing, as the game lacked a rotation system, less cards were released through drops year-on-year and powercreep became a prevalent issue to ensure newer cards were viable (i.e. held up against all previous meta decks), despite efforts of Homecoming to try bring a more sustainable design space. Advertising for the game was present but limited, for example, no advertisement for standalone Gwent was shown in The Witcher 3 in menus, and the e-sports scene attracted lower funding after Season 1. Another avenue of possibly renewing interest was The Witcher IV, however at the time it was uncertain whether the game would feature any Gwent minigame or not. In general, CDPR has shifted their strategy to focusing entirely to their prime forte, RPGs, with an entire Witcher trilogy renewed alongside remakes and a sequel to Cyberpunk.

Gwent: Rogue Mage was a commercial flop but previously expected to be a major advertising draw into Gwent with the original codename 'Project Golden Nekker'. The game itself was intentionally not widely advertised whatsoever, due to the fact that internal playtesting revealed that prior Gwent experience was necessary to enjoy the game. However, Gwent players generally found it to be quite difficult until card combos are discovered, and then repetitive otherwise (with losing a single match failing the entire run), as well as the stark contrast to any other form of Gwent in the sense that there was no round system which plays a large strategic element in the definition of Gwent gameplay, which was removed as runs were intended to be quick. Thronebreaker: The Witcher Tales also did not do as well as commercially hoped, but had much more positive player reception (including those outside of Gwent experience), but fell within a completely different sub-genre (a narrative-driven experience contrasted to a roguelike that was intended to be more replayable) and came alongside Homecoming years prior.

As planned, official support for Gwent came to an end in October 2023. After laying off dozens of employees, CDPR released one final update with several card rebalances, including a system whereby the community will be able to maintain the balance of the game democratically.

== Esports ==
Esports in Gwent was a prominent focus of the game, with sizeable prize pools that were distributed among participants. The e-sports portion of the game was highly tied to the Ranked ladder, with players at Pro Rank, also known as rank 0, being eligible to participate. Notably, Pro Rank is the first stage of the game where match-making and progression is done solely on an Elo rating system/Matchmaking-rating system. With Esports tournaments mostly being organised through CDPR, the Esports scene of Gwent quickly ground to a halt after official support for the game ended.

The game has monthly themed seasons that rotate, and correspondingly reset the Ranked ladder. Gwent Opens were held every 3 seasons, drawing participants from the players who qualified each season. The winners of the preceding years' Gwent Opens were then invited to the Gwent Masters tournament, which was the only way to qualify aside from accumulating enough Crown Points from previous tournaments and the ladder.

The top 16 Ranked Ladder players were invited to the top 16 qualifier for that season, and if they fail to qualify, were then invited to the top 64 qualifier the following week. The top 16 qualifiers was a two-day event, the first day using a Double-Elimination format and the second day using a mix of Single-Elimination and Double-Elimination formats. The top 64 qualifier also occurred within a two-day period, but uses a Swiss-system tournament for the first day and a mix of Single-Elimination and Double-Elimination formats for the second day.

Gwent Open and Gwent Masters both used a Single-Elimination format. Similar to qualifiers, matches were usually played in a best-of-five format, and featured deck-banning for each series. Additionally, players were aware of whether they will be playing each match first or second, and could correspondingly queue appropriate decks.

== Reception ==
Reception

Aggregate score
| Aggregator | Score |
|---|---|
| Metacritic | PC: 80/100 |

Review scores
| Publication | Score |
|---|---|
| Game Informer | 8.5/10 |
| GameSpot | 8/10 |

Gwent was nominated for "Most Promising New eSports Game" at the 2019 SXSW Gaming Awards and for "Best Polish Game Art" at the 2019 Digital Dragons Awards.

Gwent was chosen as one of the best competitive games of 2020 in the Google Play Awards.

== Related games ==
A standalone physical card game of Gwent was included with a physical copy of the Witcher 3: The Wild Hunt videogame's Xbox One Collector's Edition of the video game (Northern Realms and Nilfgaardian Empire factions) and in "Hearts of Stone"physical expansion for PC/PS4 (Scoia'Tel and Monsters factions).

A full physical edition of Gwent, Gwent: The Legendary Card Game, has been released through No Loading Games and Hachette Boardgames in 2025.However the physical editions are based on the Witcher 3 iteration of Gwent, which was not balanced for competitive multiplayer play, as a result the set is accompanied by suggested alternative rules.

Since in the The Witcher 3: Wild Hunt, Gwent was a popular minigame, it has been confirmed to return in The Witcher IV. However, it is likely to be of simpler complexity than the standalone, akin to The Witcher 3 Gwent, to make the minigame digestible rather than overly-complex.
