= Lords of the Fallen II =

Upcoming action role-playing game by CI Games

- Developer: Hexworks
- Publisher: CI Games
- Series: Lords of the Fallen
- Engine: Unreal Engine 5
- Platforms: Nintendo Switch 2; PlayStation 5; Windows; Xbox Series X/S
- Release: Q1 2027
- Genre: Action role-playing
- Modes: Single-player, multiplayer

Lords of the Fallen II is an upcoming action role-playing video game developed by Hexworks and published by CI Games. As the third entry of the Lords of the Fallen series, it is a direct sequel to the 2023 reboot. The game is set to be released in Q1 2027 for Nintendo Switch 2, PlayStation 5, Windows and Xbox Series X/S.

== Development and release ==
The game was announced by CI Games at Gamescom Opening Night Live in 2025. It is developed with Unreal Engine 5. CI Games initially reached an agreement with Epic Games Store to publish the PC version exclusively, but a separation announcement in May 2026 meant the PC version would arrive on Steam and Epic Store simultaneously.

The game is set to be released on the PlayStation 5, Windows and Xbox Series X/S platforms. Nintendo Switch 2 would also be available for the first time in the series. Following the release of the game's second trailer, the game was slotted for a Q3/Q4 2026 release. Weeks later, it was announced that the game would be delayed to Q1 2027. This is intended to avoid the clash with some highly anticipated titles such as Grand Theft Auto VI.
