= Art of Murder: Hunt for the Puppeteer =

2009 video game

- Developer: City Interactive
- Publisher: City Interactive
- Series: Art of Murder
- Platform: Windows
- Release: USA: February 17, 2009; RUS: August 13, 2009
- Genre: Adventure
- Mode: Single-player

Art of Murder: Hunt for the Puppeteer (Polish: Art of Murder: Klątwa Lalkarza), also known as Art of Murder 2, is an adventure game developed and published by City Interactive and is the second installment in the Art of Murder series. Although it was published by City Interactive in 2008, the American version of the game was not published until 2009.

== Gameplay ==
Gameplay

Art of Murder 2 is a full 3-D adventure game played from a third-person perspective. Players move their character by clicking on locations shown in the main display, and each scene will only be finished when a character has completed all the actions on the screen. Players interact with NPCs as well as specific objects by clicking or dragging. An in-game hint system is located on the bottom left corner of the screen as a question mark. Items carried by players can be combined with additional items. Objects return to their original position whenever they are dropped. Interactive cut scenes are triggered once a player has completed location objectives.

To complete the game, the player explores real life locations such as Paris, New Orleans or Havana. Some game stages have a time limit that, if not completed is punishable by the character's death. If a character dies, the player's progress is saved automatically and the player may start over from their last save.

Art of Murder contains a range of mechanical and slider puzzles.

== Plot ==
=== New Orleans ===
The New Orleans location begins with a SWAT team arriving at a hangar on August 3, 2007 where they find a body hanging from hooks, devoid of blood. Concurrently, detective Nicole Bonnet receives a call informing her that the French police have found another body in Paris and she flies there.

When detective Bonnet arrives in Paris on August 15, a French police inspector explains the body was that of a female ballet dancer completely drained of blood. Additionally, a doll dressed in a French Revolution style dress was lying near the body.

Detective Bonnet investigates the scene and finds that the victim's name was Elizabeth Soapault. Soon after, another ballet dancer named Jacqueline Lorrein is murdered in room number 13 of a Montmartre apartment. The inspector tells Bonnet they have a witness report claiming an American named Jack Dupree rented the room. The witness claimed that she saw Dupree running in haste, dropping something into a grate.

The inspector gives Bonnet his business card while asking her to forget about the case. Arriving back at her hotel, the desk clerk hands her a letter from Jack Dupree stating he is innocent and wants to meet her in private at 11 p.m. at Pont des Invalides.

=== Pont des Invalides ===
Nicole accepts the invitation and drives to Pont des Invalides. There, she meets Jack, and he invites her to come to his apartment to show her his evidence to prove his innocence. While they are talking, a hooded teenager on a motorcycle passes by. He shoots at Jack, who has just mentioned to Nicole that someone wants to frame him. Nicole throws her laptop at the moving bike and knocks the gun out of the rider's hands. She picks it up and fires it at his back, but misses.

After this incident, she is confronted by the police, who bring her to Inspector Pety. The inspector orders her to leave France, assigning a fellow officer to accompany Nicole while she packs her bags. She and the police officer arrive at the hotel, and Nicole pretends to pack her belongings. She escapes through the hotel's back door, and puts a handkerchief in the police car's exhaust pipe.

=== Montmartre apartment ===
On August 16, 2007, Nicole goes to a Montmartre apartment, where she thinks she will find the evidence of Jack's innocence. Since she doesn't want to tamper with evidence, she decides to sneak into a room by going through a side window. In the apartment she finds a secret compartment, in which she finds a diary in a chest. The diary contains information on the framing. At this point, she hears someone enter the apartment. She hides in a closet and sees a man with a gun coming in. As soon he gets close enough, she jumps out and knocks him to the floor. Nicole jumps out of the window, with the man shooting at her back. After her flight, Nicole drives to a hotel, where she meets a man named Louis Carnot. He asks her about Jack and some documents. Nicole becomes very suspicious of him. After this, she travels to Moulin Rouge.

=== Moulin Rouge ===
Nicole arrives at Moulin Rouge the next day. As soon as she arrives, she goes to the backyard, and opens a hatch with a metal pole. She enters a dressing room, and opens the door with Jack's key, which she took from his desk in the apartment. In a dressing room, she finds a phone and reads a message about the next victim. After that, she snoops around the dressing room, where she finds aspirin. She overhears somebody talking, and leaves the building. Nicole runs outside and gets into her car, but is delayed by an unknown man in her car. He points a gun at her and forces her to drive to a hotel. In a hotel room, the man tells her that Jack Dupree has been killed, and that he wants the chest that Nicole took from a secret compartment in Jack's apartment.

She opens the chest with the key she got from a dressing room drawer. Inside, they find a diary and broken pieces of paper which, when combined, reveals half of a map. They set out to find the remaining half, using letters from a man named Marc Taine to Jack as a clue. In his house they find photos of victims, including planned ones. Nicole is shocked when she discovers that the murderer chose her to be his next target and already prepared a doll for her. Before she leaves, she finds Taine's frozen body in a freezer and has a confrontation with the killer. He kills her accomplice and she escapes to Spain.

=== Spain ===
In Spain, she returns the car to a mechanic and begins traveling on foot in search of an antiquarian. She finds a sclerotic 70-year-old man with considerable knowledge of antiques, who is also wanted by the killer. She wants him to go with her to Paris, where she assumes he will be safe. He tells Nicole that he has the killer's list, with full names, dating back to the French Revolution. However, he is killed before they can leave. Behind a safe in an antique showroom, she finds a secret compartment containing the list mentioned by the antiquarian. Nicole then travels to Marseille.

=== Marseille ===
When she arrives at Marseille, she goes through a gate behind the house in which Louis Carrot is living. She climbs the wall, and then opens a window in a basement by using a glass cutter. In the basement, she finds Jack Dupree tied and gagged. She takes the gag from his mouth, and asks him some questions. From him she learns that Louis Carrot is a puppeteer, and that Jack is an eyewitness to the second victim, Jacquiline, his mistress. He tells her that the killer let him live when he and Nicole were on a bridge. It was Louis that was on the motorcycle trying to eliminate Nicole from participating in the investigation. After the chat, she goes to the kitchen stove, under which she finds a coin and a key. She then goes upstairs to open one of the doors. She gets past the security guard by sneaking around him. As soon as she enters the room she locks the door, upon fear that the guard might hear her at any time. She goes to the fireplace, on top of which she finds a picture of the killer and Marc Taine. Nicole discovers that Louis is Marc Taine's brother. She then finds a secret compartment behind the bookcase, namely a door that leads to a room. Inside the room she finds the second fragment of the map. After that she runs to the door and tries to unlock it, but the key gets stuck. She then takes a statue that is standing on the fireplace, and wraps it into a map, both of which she then tosses out the window.

After that, she opens the door and sees the two guards with two dobermans. The guards start to interrogate her about her visit, and accuse her of sneaking in without an appointment, which she lied to them about. After not getting the information they want, the guards make a bet to each other: They will send the dogs to chase after Nicole, as she tries to climb over the wall. The chances that she will succeed, in the guards' opinion, are zero. She begins to run, picks up the statue from the ground, and jumps onto a rope. Nick, her coworker, that has just arrived, rescues her from behind the wall. Nick suggests her to fly to Havana, Cuba, where she will be safe, and she will find plenty of information on Marc Taine, who turns out to have ancestry in Cuba. Nick gives her the number which she'll need to call to arrange the flight. Nicole goes to a phone booth, calls the number given to her by Nick, and receives a call back confirming that her tickets for the flight are ordered, and that she will fly to Havana from Provence Airport.

=== Cuba ===
==== Havana ====
She arrives in Havana in the evening via rickshaw, where her first task is to meet an archivist. She finds a note on the door that reads: "Meet me at the cafe". She meets the archivist, an old man, and introduces herself. He asks her if she has any cigars, which she does not. She then goes to a hotel and finds a box of cigars in a broken elevator. She returns to the old man and gives him cigars and a lighter. The man then says that as soon as he finishes the cigar he will help her find the person she is looking for in the archives. At the archives, Nicole explains that she is looking for information on the Montoute family. The archivist tells her that he is being watched, and that he would like to have this discussion somewhere private. Nicole does not realize that since arriving in Cuba, she has been followed by a man in a blue shirt. The man tailing her enters the office. She tries to talk to him unsuccessfully, then traps him in an elevator. She returns to the archivist and receives files on Eduardo Montoute. The archivist replies that there is an estate that is located in Las Tunas, that is owned by one of Eduardo's living relatives. He lends her his car to help her investigate further.

==== Las Tunas ====
She arrives to Las Tunas on April 21, where she needs to find the relative. Unfortunately, the relative can't be found, and the secret compartment she found in the garden was looted. She goes out of estate and meets a mechanic with a rickshaw. The mechanic tells her that he is in need of a cap, since he lost the one he had. Nicole lends him a cap, and asks him about the estate. The mechanic replies that he knows nothing about it but if she wants to, she can ask a shaman under the name of Madame Budoe in the village. She pays a visit to Madame, but the lady that guards her tells her to wait till tomorrow, because Madame Budoe is busy with other clients. Nicole tells her that her case is urgent, and that she doesn't have time. The lady then makes a compromise: If Nicole will fix the fan, then she will let her in right away. Nicole fixes the fan, and the lady fulfills her promise as well. She then goes to the shaman. When she arrives there she sees an old woman sitting in a rocking chair and surrounded by jars which contain different plants. Nicole asks Madame for a piece of a map, to which Madame replies that she might have one. She also asks her about the relative, on which she gets the answer that the shaman is probably an ancestor to the estate. Madame Budoe tells her to collect for her some herbs and make a sacrifice to Lazarus. She collects the herbs, and brings them to Madame, in exchange for which she gets that last piece of map. While preparing the sacrifice she gets knocked out unconscious. While being in that state, Nicole sees the killer's face. After she gets up, she sees that the shaman lady has been hanged, and that a doll dressed in ancestral clothes is lying near her. Moreover, the streets are empty. She hops into her car and goes to Louis Carrot's estate. There she finds a note from Jack Dupree in the basement, telling her to go to the Montmarte cemetery.

=== Montmartre cemetery ===
At the cemetery, she overhears two thugs that interrogated Jack Dupree. She also hears the argument over the map and that one of the keys is in Jack Dupree's apartment. Nicole jumps onto her motorcycle and drives to Jack's apartment. She comes a bit late, as the thug is already there trying to break the door. She then goes downstairs and rings a bell, from which a woman's voice answers. She tells the woman to call the police, which she does. Soon, the thug is arrested, with Nicole free to go inside. In Dupree's apartment she finds a dagger that was well hidden behind a picture over a fireplace. After she takes the dagger, she jumps onto the motorcycle and pays a visit to the hotel on the way to the cemetery, where she picks up the box she found in Jack Dupree's apartment. She arrives to the cemetery and goes to the rest of the thugs unafraid. The apparent puppeteer tells her to open the grave in which he believes the treasures are being stored. Nicole demands the map, and, by placing the dagger and the key that she found in Jack's box on the map, opens the grave. As soon as she matches the dagger and the key, she gets the path on the map, which she gives to the killer. The killer, however, doesn't fulfill his promise, as he is afraid to trust her because she might turn him in to the police, even though he claimed that he was innocent. He leaves her with his accomplice, and takes Jack Dupree with him. As soon as he and Jack leave, Nicole starts a fight with the accomplice that results in him falling on the bricks near the asphalt and cracking his head. After that, she goes into the tomb. There she goes down by a rubber hose, after which she travels through an underground lake. She finds an open door and goes in it. The apparent killer turns his gun on her and fires it. Nicole falls on the ground unhurt, but her gun is by her side and not in her hands. She tries to grab the gun but the apparent killer warns her that if she does he will shoot Jack. Then, out of a blue, the real killer shows up. From him Nicole finds out that he was the one behind the murders of eight people, that he was a puppeteer she was looking for, and that he did it out of revenge that was 200 years in the making! After that dialogue the real killer's brother calls him a fool, provoking the killer and causing him to open fire, killing his brother and injuring Jack. Nicole, realizing that it's time to act, grabs the gun and fires it at the puppeteer, killing him. After that, she and Jack leave the tomb and go straight to the cafe.

== Reception ==
The game received a score of 56% from Metacritic, 60% from GameRankings, and a 2.5 from Adventure Gamers in which Andrea Morstabilini said: "Despite all these criticisms, however, Art of Murder 2 isn't a bad game: it has many faults, but none manage to ruin the experience entirely."
