= Sniper: Ghost Warrior =

Video game series

- Logo
- Genres: Tactical shooter, stealth
- Developer: CI Games
- Publisher: CI Games
- Platforms: Microsoft Windows; Xbox 360; PlayStation 3; PlayStation 4; Xbox One; Xbox Series X/S; PlayStation 5
- First release: Sniper: Art of Victory; 13 June 2008
- Latest release: Sniper Ghost Warrior Contracts 2; 4 June 2021

Sniper: Ghost Warrior is a series of tactical shooter stealth video games that are developed and published by City Interactive.

== Games ==
=== Sniper: Art of Victory (2008) ===
The first game of the series was released on 13 June 2008. The poor quality of the game led to negative reviews.

=== Sniper: Ghost Warrior (2010) ===
A sequel, titled Sniper: Ghost Warrior, was released on 29 June 2010 for Microsoft Windows, Xbox 360 and PlayStation 3.

=== Sniper: Ghost Warrior 2 (2013) ===
The third evolution of the series switched from Chrome Engine to CryEngine. It was released on 12 March 2013 for Microsoft Windows, PlayStation 3 and Xbox 360.

=== Sniper Ghost Warrior 3 (2017) ===
Sniper Ghost Warrior 3 was announced on 16 December 2014 and received its first gameplay during E3 2015. The game was aimed to have AAA production sale, and ultimately sold more than a million copies across Microsoft Windows, PlayStation 4 and Xbox One.

=== Sniper Ghost Warrior Contracts (2019) ===
CI Games announced Sniper Ghost Warrior Contracts in August 2018. It uses mission-based gameplay instead of the open-world format from the third installment. It was released on 22 November 2019.

=== Sniper Ghost Warrior Contracts 2 (2021) ===
Sniper Ghost Warrior Contracts 2 was released on 4 June 2021 for Microsoft Windows, PlayStation 4, Xbox One and Xbox Series X/S, and on 24 August 2021 for PlayStation 5.

== Reception ==
Aggregate review scores
Game	Metacritic
Sniper: Art of Victory	(PC) 36/100
Sniper: Ghost Warrior	(PC) 55/100 (PS3) 53/100 (X360) 45/100
Sniper: Ghost Warrior 2	(PC) 52/100 (PS3) 52/100 (X360) 52/100
Sniper Ghost Warrior 3	(PC) 59/100 (PS4) 55/100 (XONE) 57/100
Sniper Ghost Warrior Contracts	(PC) 71/100 (PS4) 65/100 (XONE) 67/100
Sniper Ghost Warrior Contracts 2	(PC) 73/100 (PS4) 68/100 (PS5) 81/100 (XSXS) 74/100

=== Sales ===
In January 2021, CI Games CEO Marek Tyminski confirmed that the Sniper: Ghost Warrior franchise had sold over eleven million copies.
