= Lords of the Fallen =

Action role-playing video game series

- logo of the series
- Genre: Action role-playing
- Developers: CI Games; Deck13; Hexworks
- Publisher: CI Games
- Platforms: Android; iOS; Nintendo Switch 2; PlayStation 4; PlayStation 5; Windows; Xbox One; Xbox Series X/S
- First release: Lords of the Fallen (2014); 28 October 2014
- Latest release: Lords of the Fallen (2023); 13 October 2023

Lords of the Fallen is an action role-playing video game series by CI Games. Two installments have been released, with an upcoming entry, Lords of the Fallen II, scheduled to be released in 2027.

== Games ==
=== Lords of the Fallen (2014) ===
The first entry of the series was developed by Deck13 and CI Games and was released in October 2014 for PlayStation 4, Xbox One and Windows. An additional mobile version was released on 9 February 2017 for iOS and Android, as a paid game with in-app purchases.

=== Lords of the Fallen (2023) ===
Lords of the Fallen was rebooted in 2023. It was released for PlayStation 5, Windows, and Xbox Series X/S on 13 October 2023.

=== Lords of the Fallen II (2027) ===
The third entry of the series, Lords of the Fallen II, is scheduled to be released for Nintendo Switch 2, PlayStation 5, Windows, and Xbox Series X/S in 2027.

== Reception ==
Aggregate review scores
Game	Metacritic
Lords of the Fallen	PC: 73/100; PS4: 68/100; XONE: 71/100 iOS: 56/100
Lords of the Fallen	PC: 75/100; PS5: 70/100; XSXS: 77/100

=== Sales ===
As of March 2026, the series has sold over 2.5 million copies.
