= Terrorist Takedown 2 =

2007 video game

- Developer: City Interactive
- Publisher: City Interactive
- Series: Terrorist Takedown
- Platform: Microsoft Windows
- Release: POL: December 4, 2007; WW: May 16, 2008
- Genre: First-person shooter
- Modes: Single-player, multiplayer

Terrorist Takedown 2 (also known as Terrorist Takedown 2: US Navy Seals) is a low-budget first-person shooter video game developed and published by City Interactive.

== Reception ==
Reception

Review score
Publication	Score
GameSpot	5.3/10 (PC)

The demo of the game, containing the first mission, gained brief but widespread popularity across Europe after being released as shareware.
