= Metamorphosis (video game) =

Upcoming horror video game

METAMORPHOSIS
- Developer: luxan
- Publishers: Top Hat Studios, Doyoyo Games
- Platform: Windows
- Genres: Action, horror
- Mode: Single-player

Metamorphosis (Stylised in all caps as METAMORPHOSIS) is an upcoming 2D horror action platformer game developed by luxan and published by Top Hat Studios and Doyoyo Games. The official trailer of the game was shown in April 2026.

== Gameplay ==
The player controls Aria, a "forsaken nun" exploring large areas facing and fighting different enemies and bosses in a high-risk combat. Many movement control techniques like double jumping and dashing are available from the start, unlike in other platformer games that often unlock them after reaching a certain progress in the game.

== Plot ==
The game is set in a future where "humanity has manufactured its own rapture", as the surface of the planet has collapsed due to war and decay. The protagonist - Aria, a nun branded a sinner - descends into the depths of the world, driven by guilt, faith, and "something she cannot escape", seeking salvation in the harsh, decaying world is full of atrocities and violence.

== Reception ==
Metamorphosis was praised for its "unrelenting cavalcade of body horror", that builds up "real scare", accompanied by good sound design. The game's graphic design was widely compared to games like Signalis and Blasphemous, and gameplay aspects noted as similar to Hollow Knight.
