= Art of Murder: FBI Confidential =

2008 video game

- Developer: City Interactive
- Publisher: City Interactive
- Platform: Windows
- Release: EU: May 16, 2008; NA: July 29, 2008; FRA: August 21, 2008; AU: November 6, 2008
- Genre: Adventure
- Mode: Single-player

Art of Murder: FBI Confidential (Polish: Art of Murder: Sztuka Zbrodni) is an adventure video game and the first in the Art of Murder series. Originally released by Polish developer City Interactive in 2008, the game has been released on Steam.

== Plot and gameplay ==
Gameplay

The game sees the player solve a series of murders through detective techniques.

== Development ==
The team, which had previously produced titles like Schizm, Sentinel: Descendants in Time, and Reah, announced the game on July 5, 2007.

== Critical reception ==
Reception

Aggregate score
Aggregator	Score
Metacritic	50/100

Review scores
Publication	Score
Adventure Gamers	3.5/5
Eurogamer	4/10
Gamezebo	3.5/5
GameZone	6/10
IGN	4.5/10
Jeuxvideo.com	8/20
PC Gamer (UK)	11%
PC Gamer (US)	57%

The game received "mixed" reviews according to the review aggregation website Metacritic.

IGN appreciated that the game didn't require moon logic. Adventure Gamers felt the title offered a detective experience without the painstaking realism of Police Quest or CSI. PC Gamer criticized the plot, writing, and voiceacting. Jeuxvideo.com found the game to be bland and generic.

== Sequels ==
Several sequels were released, all developed and published by City Interactive:

- Art of Murder: Hunt for the Puppeteer – (2009, Windows)
- Art of Murder: The Secret Files – (2009, Windows)
- Art of Murder: Cards of Destiny – (2010, Windows)
- Crime Lab: Body of Evidence – (2010, Nintendo DS)
- Art of Murder: Deadly Secrets – (2011, Windows)
