= Nobody Wants to Die =

2024 video game

- Developer: Critical Hit Games
- Publisher: Plaion
- Director: Grzegorz Goleń
- Producer: Artur Jaskólski
- Programmer: Andrzej Klimek
- Artists: Andrzej Marszalek; Krzysztof Kawa
- Writers: Marcin Grembowicz; Eliasz Waszczuk
- Composer: Mikołaj Stroiński
- Engine: Unreal Engine 5
- Platforms: PlayStation 5; Windows; Xbox Series X/S
- Release: 17 July 2024
- Genre: Adventure
- Mode: Single-player

Nobody Wants to Die is a 2024 adventure video game developed by Critical Hit Games and published by Plaion. It was released on 17 July 2024 for PlayStation 5, Windows and Xbox Series X/S.

== Gameplay ==
Nobody Wants to Die is an adventure game in a first-person perspective, in which players interact with other characters and investigate crime scenes to gather evidence. Players can interact with and question characters with a choice of multiple dialogue options. Investigation involves the use of several tools to locate items of evidence at a crime scene, including a Reconstructor to visualise recorded footage of events at a scene. Clues are depicted on an evidence board, with the game questioning players to make the correct inferences from items of evidence.

== Plot ==
=== Setting ===
The game is set in New York City in the year 2329, in a future where technology has developed a method to provide humans with eternal life by storing a person's consciousness in a memory bank and switching them between bodies via a miracle material called Ichorite. The player assumes the role of James Karra, a detective in the Mortality Department, who is investigating a series of murders perpetrated by a serial killer targeting the elite of the city. When Karra is instructed by his boss to report the latest murder as an accident, he decides to investigate further. The game features multiple endings based on player choices made throughout play.

=== Synopsis ===
After a botched investigation that left both detective James Karra and his partner Seth dead, James was transferred into new but low quality body while Seth was permanently killed due the destruction his Ichorite. As a result, James is suspended from the Mortality Department and put on leave, where he suffers from period "desynchronization" attacks, mental episodes that are residual side effects of repeated Ichorite transfers. In particular he is haunted by his deceased wife Rachel, who committed suicide several years earlier. He is then contacted by the Chief of Police, Steiner, who assigns him an off the books to investigate the apartment of Edward Green, a powerful figure among the country's elite. He is also assigned an assistant, Sara, to oversee his work.

Upon arriving at the apartment, James is shocked to discover Green apparently having hanged himself and his Ichorite rendered irrecoverable due to some kind of poison. Investigating the scene, he finds evidence suggesting that Green was in fact murdered. Instead of ruling Green's death as accidental as Steiner instructed, James reports it as a murder, causing him to be suspended again. As he contemplates the significance of Green's death, James witnesses a luxury blimp owned by one of Green's associates and prime suspect in his murder, Dimitri Kovolev, crash nearby. Seeing this as an opportunity to confront Kovolev, James boards the burning airship but is confused to find out Kovolev himself was responsible for the crash, killing all of the rich passengers aboard before blowing himself up with a suicide vest.

In light these new facts, James decides to reinvestigate Green's apartment, where he finds a secret entrance leading to an underground club where the rich and powerful could swap into other bodies to engage in drugs, orgies, and other forms of depravity without consequence. Like on the airship, James finds evidence that it was Green himself who murdered everybody in the club before hanging himself. Throughout the investigation, James is also taunted by a voice in his head called the Stranger, who claims responsibility for the deaths since the elite were planning to introduce more laws to the oppress the young so that their bodies can be "repossessed" to fuel the upper classes' demand for them.

James then visits Sara personally in order to go over the evidence, and is surprised to see her in an elderly body. Sara admits that she renting out her original body on the black market as a surrogate in order to earn enough money to free her lover Taylor from the memory bank. Upon reviewing the evidence, James and Sara realize the poison Green drank to destroy his Ichorite is the same that Rachel used in her suicide. James can then come to one of two conclusions: either the Stranger has been hijacking bodies through their Ichorite to carry out his murder spree, or Green and Kovolev both came to realize the flaws of Ichorite after experiencing increasingly more powerful desynchronization attacks and set about to destroy the system themselves.

Regardless of the conclusion, James travels to the site of Seth's death, where he relives the botched attempt to track down the dealer who sold Rachel the poison. James disobeyed orders and chased the dealer onto a train, which caused a chain reaction of events that resulted in the train derailing and crashing, killing everybody on board. James is finally forced to come to terms and admit his fault in the disaster.

Sara then warns James that riots have broken out all over the city to protest new body subscription laws the government announced. Sara's client, Jane Salma, is trapped in the midst of the riots and Sara pleads for Jack to protect Salma and her body. James heads to the scene, but is shot by Steiner for disobeying too many orders. He then encounters Salma, who begins shooting at him as well. At this point, multiple endings are possible based on the player's choices.

- If James believes the Stranger has possessed Salma's body, he has the option of shooting her or letting her go. Sara resolves to continue to find a way to save Taylor, while James succumbs to his wounds and his Ichorite is stored in the memory bank.
- If James believes Green is the true suspect, he manages to calm the panicked Salma down and guides her to safety. Realizing his steadily worsening desynchronization attacks make him a potential threat, he drinks the poison to destroy his Ichorite and leaps to his true death. Sara reveals that she successfully freed Taylor from the memory bank, while James' and Rachel's spirits reunite in the afterlife.

== Development and release ==
Nobody Wants to Die was developed by Polish Wrocław-based studio Critical Hit Games, a twenty-person team that began development of the game in 2018. Co-founder Grzegorz Goleń created the game's concept with art director Andrzej Marszałek in attempt to create a "visually spectacular narrative game", with the development team inspired by cyberpunk film Blade Runner and narrative games including What Remains of Edith Finch, Firewatch, and Observer. Development of Nobody Wants to Die originally began in Unreal Engine 4 but moved to Unreal Engine 5 midway through the development cycle. The development team experienced "stability issues" in moving from Unreal Engine 4. The game was announced in March 2024 with the release of a narrative trailer, and showcased at the Gamescom Future Games Show on 8 June. Nobody Wants to Die received a digital release for PlayStation 5, Windows and Xbox Series X/S on 17 July 2024.

== Reception ==
Reception

Aggregate score
Aggregator	Score
Metacritic	75%

Review scores
Publication	Score
Edge	6/10
Eurogamer	4/5 stars
Game Informer	8/10
IGN	7/10
Jeuxvideo.com	14/20
PC Games (DE)	9/10
PCGamesN	8/10
Push Square	7.4/10
RPGFan	80%
VideoGamer.com	8/10

According to review aggregator platform Metacritic, Nobody Wants to Die received "generally favorable" reviews, with German publication GamePro and a reader poll of Eurogamer citing the game as one of the best of 2024. Critics praised the game's narrative and worldbuilding, although critiqued its linearity and the simplicity of its puzzles.
