= Sniper: Art of Victory =

2008 video game

- North American cover art
- Developer: City Interactive
- Publisher: City Interactive
- Director: Michael Sokolski
- Producer: Michal Sroczynski
- Designer: Michal Sadowski
- Programmer: Marian Jarmoszko
- Artist: Maciek Matusik
- Series: Sniper: Ghost Warrior
- Engine: Chrome Engine 2
- Platform: Microsoft Windows
- Release: EU: 13 June 2008; NA: 3 October 2008
- Genre: Tactical shooter
- Mode: Single-player

Sniper: Art of Victory (Polish: Snajper: Sztuka Zwyciężania) is a 2008 tactical shooter video game developed and published by City Interactive for Microsoft Windows. Set during World War II, the player assumes the role of a sniper ally from the Red Army that takes part in operations in the Eastern Front and Italy. It is the first entry in the Sniper: Ghost Warrior series.

== Gameplay ==
Sniper: Art of Victory consists of a series of missions in which the player must complete a number of objectives to complete them successfully. Before starting each mission, the player can read the orders in the loading screen, and in some parts of the game, some cutscenes are used to display mission objectives.

During the game, the map is a very important tool that shows the location of objectives, points of interest, sniper location points and also shows if enemy units are on alert.

=== Features ===
The game uses an advanced ballistic system that takes into account wind, bullet drop, and breathing. When a headshot is made, the camera follows the bullet on its way to the target.

== Plot ==
Set during World War II, the player assumes the role of a sniper ally from the Red Army that takes part in operations in the Eastern Front and Italy.

== Reception ==
Reception

Aggregate score
Aggregator	Score
Metacritic	36/100

Review score
Publication	Score
IGN	3/10

Sniper: Art of Victory received "generally unfavourable" reviews according to review aggregator Metacritic.
