= Sniper Ghost Warrior 3 =

2017 video game

- North American cover art
- Developer: CI Games
- Publisher: CI Games
- Director: Paul B. Robinson
- Designers: Jess Lebow; Alek Sajnach; Tomasz Pruski
- Artist: Tomek Andrzejewski
- Composer: Mikolai Stroinski
- Series: Sniper: Ghost Warrior
- Engine: CryEngine
- Platforms: Microsoft Windows; PlayStation 4 Xbox One
- Release: 25 April 2017
- Genres: Tactical shooter, stealth
- Modes: Single-player, multiplayer

Sniper Ghost Warrior 3 is a tactical shooter video game developed and published by CI Games for Microsoft Windows, PlayStation 4 and Xbox One, and was released worldwide on 25 April 2017. It is the fourth entry in the Sniper: Ghost Warrior series and is the sequel to Sniper: Ghost Warrior 2, and is also the first game in the series to feature an open world environment. The game received average reviews upon release.

== Gameplay ==
Screenshot showing the game at night, and its rain effects

Similar to its predecessors, Sniper Ghost Warrior 3 is a first-person tactical shooter game. It is designed to be less linear than Ghost Warrior and Ghost Warrior 2, since the title is the first in the series to feature an open world environment, which can be freely explored by the player. The game's world is scattered with different activities and side missions which are known as "war crimes". These can be completed by the player if they are not playing the main missions. According to CI Games, the title is designed to be accessible for both players who are new to the franchise or the genre, while tactical enough for more hardcore players.

The game is based on three different pillars: target, execute, and survive. The player can use different approaches to complete missions and defeat enemies, as maps are now larger and more open-ended. For instance, the player can utilize stealth and melee combat to kill enemies, in gun and run style, or use the weapons or gadgets provided, like sniper rifles, to snipe enemies from a long distance.

The locations of the game's objectives are not shown on the mini-map provided to the player. The player is required to find them by completing intel-gathering missions. The player can also use a drone, which is one of the newest additions to the series and can be controlled by the player, to scan and survey the environment, and to detect enemies. The drone can also be used to hack enemies' electronic equipment and weapons, and to create distractions. However, there are risks when the player is using the drone, as enemies may become alerted when they spot it. As one of the game's core experiences is sniping, the accuracy of long-range shots is affected by various factors, such as calibration of the rifle's scope, weather, wind speed, distance, gravity, and the protagonist's breathing strength and rate. As a result, the player has to plan, adapt, and react to the game's environments to alter these factors.

Navigation is enhanced in Ghost Warrior 3. The player can carry out some "extreme navigation" movements, according to the game's developer, such as parkouring, climbing ledges and rappelling. The player can activate Scout Mode, which is an ability of the game's protagonist to highlight places of interest and detect explosives such as mines. The player can also make use of the mode to find a new sniping spot during missions. The game also focuses on realism; as a result, it also features a dynamic weather system and day-night cycle which affects the gameplay and enemy behavior. The player can make use of these situations to create tactical advantages.

In addition, the player can travel to the "safe house" where they can collect supplies and resources like first-aid kits and ammunition for weapons. These safe houses also act as fast travel points for the player for easy navigation of the world. In addition, the player can craft and modify their weapons and bullets. These upgrades can improve the weapons' efficiency and accuracy. When not playing missions, the player can interact with a neutral faction, which may or may not help the player in completing missions. Safehouse is a safe place where the player can choose equipment, sleep to a designated hour, craft, buy items in the shop and start missions. There are several safe houses on each map, and the player needs to discover them to be able to use them. There will be loot waiting or new weapons to equip in newly discovered safe houses. The player can fast-travel to safe houses from any place in the world (fast travel is disabled after entering a mission area).

After choosing a mission, its area will be visible on the map, and a GPS path will be displayed. Various points of interest, which the player discovered earlier, will also be checked on the map. The road to the mission area leads through open maps, where the player can encounter random events, points of interest, hunt for animals, etc. Which route the player chooses is up to them.

The player has their own car for exploration. It will be there whenever they exit a safehouse or travel to previously discovered fast travel points. The player can use it to quickly get across map areas. Enemies can also spot the player inside the vehicle, so being careful is still required.

== Plot ==
The player takes the role of U.S. Marine Captain Jonathan "Jon" North, who, along with his brother Robert, is sent to the Russian-Ukrainian border to destroy an abandoned stockpile of Soviet-era bio-weapons before they can be stolen by terrorists. The two succeed in their mission, but are ambushed by an unidentified group of special forces soldiers, led by a man named Vasilisk who plays a game of Russian roulette with Jon before knocking him out and capturing Robert.

Two years later, Jon is sent to Georgia to help destabilize the local Georgian separatist cells, who are reported to be receiving an abnormally high level of funding and resources. Jon accepted the assignment with the hidden agenda of locating his brother Robert, after hearing intelligence chatter placing him in the region. He is assisted by his JSOC handler Frank Simms, a Georgian ex-special forces sniper named Lydia with whom he was formerly in a romantic relationship, and Israeli Mossad agent Raquel, who is in the region looking to capture and recruit a Russian scientist named Sergei Flostov whom she believes is being held by the Separatists.

The Separatists are led by a pair of twins, Davit and Tomas, and a woman named Inna, whom Tomas is scheduled to marry. Jon infiltrates the wedding in hopes of gathering intel to help him assassinate Tomas later, but the wedding is interrupted when Tomas' bodyguard guns him down at the altar before being killed himself by an unseen sniper. Continuing other missions against the Separatists, Jon learns that events in Georgia are being manipulated by an international conspiracy known as the 23 Society, whose forces are equipped with high-tech experimental weaponry and led by a mysterious soldier with seemingly superhuman abilities known as Armazi.

In the process of destabilizing the Separatists, Jon is sent to kill a local crime lord doing business with the Separatists, who turns out to be Vasilisk, who is revealed as a member of the 23 Society. When confronted by Jon, Vasilisk once again plays a game of Russian roulette with him, which ends with Vasilisk shooting himself in the head before Jon can interrogate him.

Jon is eventually confronted by Armazi himself, who turns out to be Robert, who has been subjected to drug therapy, genetic engineering, and brainwashing to transform him into a supersoldier loyal to the 23 Society. Robert demonstrates his superhuman abilities to Jon before unsuccessfully attempting to recruit him into the 23 Society.

Later, Jon receives intel that the scientist Sergei Flostov is being held at a Separatist facility. Jon rescues Flostov, who states that he was forced by the 23 Society to help them create brainwashed, genetically modified super-soldiers. Flostov informs Jon that the 23 Society recently captured an American soldier and are going to execute him soon due to failing to brainwash him. Jon travels to the location where the captured soldier is being held and discovers it is Cole Anderson, the protagonist of the previous game. Cole, who was defeated in combat by Armazi and later mutilated by him beyond the point of recovery, reveals to Jon that Flostov is actually the leader of the 23 Society, and then asks Jon to leave behind his pistol so that he can end his own life and die with dignity, which he does as Jon leaves to pursue Flostov. Flostov contacts Jon over the radio and gloats about how the 23 Society killed Robert's wife Milla, then used her death to break his mind and brainwash him.

Jon saves one of the Separatist leaders, Inna, from an attack by 23 Society super-soldiers, and learns from her that the other remaining Separatist leader, Davit, is allied with the 23 Society and responsible for killing her fiancé Tomas. Jon kills Davit, and in exchange, Inna tells him where to find Flostov and Robert/Armazi, who are located at an old uranium mine where Flostov has set up a nuclear reactor to produce yellowcake uranium for the creation of nuclear weapons. As Jon infiltrates the mine fighting through mercenaries and 23 Society supersoldiers, the nuclear reactor becomes unstable. Jon confronts Flostov and Robert at the reactor, revealing to Robert that Flostov and the 23 Society killed his wife Milla, staging her death to make it look like she was killed in an American drone strike to turn him against his country. Upon learning how he had been brainwashed and manipulated, Robert kills Flostov, then locks himself in the reactor room to manually stop the meltdown in order to give Jon time to escape, dying of radiation poisoning in the process. Jon exfiltrates in a helicopter alongside Lydia and Raquel, vowing revenge against the remaining members of the 23 Society.

== Development ==
The game is developed by CI Games, which also developed the game's predecessors. While the previous games were not a critical success, the company considered the series a commercial success, the first two games of the franchise selling over 5.5 million copies collectively.

Announced on 16 December 2014 and regarded as "the best sniper experience for PC and next-gen consoles" by CI Games, the game's first gameplay footage was shown during E3 2015, while the first gameplay was uploaded to CI Games' YouTube channel on 22 July 2015.

The game was scheduled for the first half of 2016, however it was delayed due to ambitious plans (i.e. open world) and feedback received from the game's beta.

The game's budget and scale are significantly expanded and are larger than that of its predecessors, and the title is the first entry in the series to have a AAA production scale. The game's creative director is Paul B. Robinson, a military veteran who also has a 20-year career in game development. The lead narrative designer is Jess Lebow, who had worked on franchises like League of Legends, Guild Wars and Far Cry. According to CI Games, Sniper: Ghost Warrior 2 laid the foundation for the game's development.

== Reception ==
Reception

Aggregate score
| Aggregator | Score |
|---|---|
| Metacritic | PC: 59/100; PS4: 55/100; XONE: 57/100 |

Review scores
| Publication | Score |
|---|---|
| Destructoid | 3/10 |
| GameSpot | 5/10 |
| GameStar | 70/100 |
| IGN | 5.5/10 |
| Jeuxvideo.com | 14/20 |
| Push Square | 4/10 |
| The Guardian | 3/5 |

Sniper Ghost Warrior 3 received "mixed or average" reviews, according to review aggregator Metacritic.

JeuxActu wrote that good open world had not been accomplished due to budget. "Pockets of civilian life do their best to present the illusion of a living, breathing society, but their nonplussed reactions to a burly marine barging into their houses aren't exactly believable," wrote Richard Wakeling of GameSpot.

Caley Roark of IGN wondered why nothing in this game felt "novel or unique". Then Caley realized the game was a comeback to linear action games he had enjoyed on the original Xbox, even if disguised in open-world clothing. Caley wrote "Variety keeps these tight missions from getting repetitive". He thought AI to be mostly competent, it "offered a reasonable challenge" but did not cheat by finding him without reason. However, Caley Roark did not like the graphics of Sniper Ghost Warrior 3, called character models and textures "cartoonish". In the end, he gave the game a "mediocre" rating of 5.5.

PlayStation Universe gave a score of 7 and wrote: "this latest installment is the finest the series has seen to date, even if that might seem like faint praise to some" and "narrative of Sniper Ghost Warrior 3 pulls liberally from the pantheon of cheesy sniper and scout movies that have come and gone over the last twenty years".

Richard Wakeling of GameSpot also attributed the plot to B-movies: "Even the predictable, profanity-laden story is reminiscent of the type of gritty B-movies Steven Seagal is known for". Richard Wakeling gave the game a "mediocre" rating of 5, giving the article header "misses the mark". Wakeling agreed that open world and the connected increase of scale and flexibility of the game had been a good idea but still maintained that the game is "frequently disrupted by a myriad of flaws", such as the barrenness of the open-world environment and the multitude of technical and graphical performance glitches. Richard Wakeling noted that sniping in the game "is all about being cautious and taking a measured approach" which "offers a unique approach" which, in turn, makes Sniper Ghost Warrior 3 stand out from its contemporaries. However, he summed up by claiming "sniping is the winning card in its [Sniper Ghost Warrior 3] deck, but CI Games regularly plays other hands to the game's detriment".

Ray Porreca of Destructoid gave the game a "poor" rating of 3. Porreca called the game dull; a "boring open-world shooter stitched together with half-baked gameplay systems and incongruous storytelling". Porreca critiqued the game's open-world setting, calling it a "detriment to the game". Eurogamer's reviewer, however, wrote: "during the core loop of infiltration, sniping and exfiltration - the open-world shines."

Will Freeman from The Guardian seemed he couldn't make up his mind whether Sniper Ghost Warrior 3 manages to distinguish itself from other shooters. He writes "It's full of decent enough missions that often require a more tactical approach than those seen in more gung-ho shooters", however he writes "sniping gunplay doesn't quite do enough to make this feel distinct". Finally, he summed up: "with so many military shooters on offer, there is still not quite enough here to make it stand out". According to Freeman, the game's narrative is full of stereotypes, the setting too familiar, but the game is pretty.

Dan Thompson of Push Square agreed that the game's narrative had stereotypes, which he called "generic and boring". However, he appreciated the game's "fun gameplay mechanics". He also wrote that picking off enemies one by one through stealth "definitely feels as if you're a ghost". However, he was critical of the game's technical performance, writing: "The game is incredibly unoptimized, one of the worst we've seen this generation". He also complained the reviewers had gotten stuck in the environment with their vehicle "almost twice".

=== Sales ===
Sniper Ghost Warrior 3 sold over 1 million copies of the game across PC, PS4, and Xbox One in its first 10 months. CI Games CEO Marek Tyminski stated that the title had achieved a relatively successful outcome despite mediocre media reception. The game was the lead contributor to CI Games' €24 million in profits over the 2017 fiscal year.
