= Sniper: Ghost Warrior 2 =

2013 video game

- North American cover art
- Developer: City Interactive
- Publisher: City Interactive
- Series: Sniper: Ghost Warrior
- Engine: CryEngine 3
- Platforms: Microsoft Windows, PlayStation 3, Xbox 360
- Release: NA: 12 March 2013; EU: 15 March 2013; AU: 19 March 2013
- Genres: Tactical shooter, stealth
- Modes: Single-player, multiplayer

Sniper: Ghost Warrior 2 is a 2013 tactical shooter video game developed and published by City Interactive for Microsoft Windows, PlayStation 3 and Xbox 360. It is the third entry in the Sniper: Ghost Warrior series and is the sequel to Sniper: Ghost Warrior.

== Gameplay ==
Sniper: Ghost Warrior 2 is a tactical shooter that employs stealth, hand-to-hand assassinations and titular sniping techniques. Gameplay features realistic bullet physics that factors distance, wind, and bullet drop when sniping targets.

== Plot ==
The game starts with player taking control of U.S. Marine Captain Cole Anderson, in the Philippines, with CIA Officer Diaz making their way to an old Russian radar post to destroy it while working on a tip that some mercenaries had assembled there to broker a deal for a biological weapon. While Diaz destroys it, he overhears enemy radio chatter about the capture of a spy working for the PSC by the mercenaries. Diaz commands a team to rescue the operative while Anderson makes his way to provide covering fire from a cave overlooking the resort, where the soldier is being held captive and where the supposed deal is scheduled to take place. They save the soldier, however while monitoring the deal Anderson sees one of the dealers to be Merinov, an old aquantaince from his past, and subsequently the entire team is ambushed by an enemy sniper and everyone except Anderson is either killed or captured. Anderson heads to a village to intercept the transfer of the bio-weapon as well as his captured teammates. He manages to find Diaz and Gomez just as they are about to be executed, and when guards kill Gomez, Anderson intervenes to save Diaz. However, the bio-weapon is lost. Diaz links up with Anderson, while escaping from the pursuing mercenaries. After successfully escaping their pursuers Diaz remarks, "it's Sarajevo all over again".

Anderson has been sent to the brig for disobeying direct orders (rescuing his team-mates instead of securing the bio-agent WMD which was the primary objective). He remembers events in Sarajevo, 1993, where he and his spotter Carl Maddox were tasked to take pictures of genocide by Serbian forces led by Marko Vladić during the Bosnian War. They meet a Russian contact Merinov inside the city. After securing a strategic point and taking the pictures of the genocide, Maddox loses his cool unable to watch the atrocities further, and goes against orders to kill Vladić. Anderson reluctantly follows him. Merinov shows them a collapsed building overlooking Vladić's position. Merinov leaves to find transport for Maddox and Anderson while they ambush the Serbian Commander. Anderson shoots Vladić and they run to the extraction point. There Merinov betrays them to the Serbian forces and they are captured. Anderson escapes to stop Merinov from framing US forces for the genocide. Anderson finds out from command that Maddox is actually a traitor working with Merinov, who manipulated him to kill Vladić leaving his forces free to take part in gun running. He is ordered to kill Maddox instead of Merinov. Anderson shoots Maddox inside a moving jeep and keeps the shell casing of the bullet which he shot Maddox with.

Back in the prison, Diaz visits Cole, informing him that he has pulled in favours to get him out of the brig and back in action with him as they need him to kill Merinov who is ready to sell the bio-agent to a Fanatical Jihadi Warlord in Kashmir - a fallout of which could create a war between Pakistan and India and profit Merinov's gun running operation. Diaz and Anderson head to Tibet to assassinate Merinov and recover the WMD. On the way to the deal site they suffer an accident and lose their equipment. After recovering their equipment and escaping a collapsing caveway they finally reach the nest overlooking the ambush site. While aiming to shoot Merinov, Anderson sees Maddox, apparently having survived his shot coming out of the helicopter. Maddox notices them and alerts their own mercenary forces to the ambush. Anderson shoots and kills Merinov through the glass of the helicopter, causing it to crash. Maddox however survives and secures the bio-weapon and taunts Anderson to come after him. Diaz and Anderson go after Maddox which eventually leads to Anderson having a sniping duel with Maddox. Finally Anderson shoots and kills Maddox, securing the bio-weapon. Diaz asks him if he has anyone waiting for him back at home to which Anderson replies 'My rifle is my best friend, it is my life' and drops the shell he kept for 20 years.

== Release ==
The initial release was scheduled in August 2012 but Eurogamer revealed the game was pushed back to October, which was then pushed back again to January 2013 on 26 July 2012. The date was further pushed back to 12 March 2013.

Sniper: Ghost Warrior 2 was released in both the normal retail version and a limited "Bulletproof Steelbook Edition" that includes the soundtrack, a booklet of the history of sniping and extra downloadable content.

=== Downloadable content ===
==== Siberian Strike ====
The events in this downloadable content (DLC) serve as a prequel to the events in original game. The player once again assumes the role of Cole Anderson who has been inserted deep behind enemy lines in Siberia, to locate, secure any information, and if possible, extract a CIA mole who was planted to work in a top secret Russian research base in a potential development of a bio/chemical WMD. Because of the volatile nature of the assignment and due to the fact that it is a black operation, the player has no tactical support available, so all his decisions are solely at his own discretion.

== Reception ==
Reception

Aggregate score
Aggregator	Score
Metacritic	PC: 52/100; PS3: 52/100; X360: 52/100

Review scores
Publication	Score
Destructoid	3/10
Electronic Gaming Monthly	4/10
Eurogamer	6/10
Game Informer	5/10
GameSpot	7/10
GamesRadar+	2.5/5
IGN	5/10
PC Gamer (US)	49/100
Polygon	5/10
VideoGamer.com	3/10

Sniper: Ghost Warrior 2 received "mixed or average" reviews, according to review aggregator Metacritic.

Gameplanet's reviewer writes that the game is not as linear as other modern (i.e. in the game's time) shooters, and calls it "easily its greatest strength".

GameSpot praises the script, acting, graphics and sound: "A well-written, well-acted script give the game a great action-movie vibe, as do authentic-looking visuals and animations powered by the CryEngine 3. Excellent sound effects do a wonderful job of pulling you in. Weapon noises, the shouts of enemy voices, the far-off rattle of weapon fire in war-torn Sarajevo, and various atmospheric sounds like the background hum of the Philippine jungle are all handled extremely well and enhance the tension as you line up each careful shot."
