= CI Games =

Polish video game developer and publisher

CI Games S.A.
- Formerly: City Interactive Sp. z o.o.; (2002–2007); City Interactive S.A.; (2007–2013)
- Type: Public
- Traded as: WSE: CIGAMES
- Industry: Video games
- Predecessors: Lemon Interactive; We Open Eyes; Tatanka
- Founded: 2002; 24 years ago
- Headquarters: Warsaw, Poland
- Area served: Worldwide
- Key people: Marek Tymiński (CEO)
- Products: Sniper: Ghost Warrior; Lords of the Fallen
- Number of employees: 153 (2024)
- Subsidiaries: Hexworks
- Website: cigames.com

CI Games S.A. (formerly City Interactive S.A.) is a Polish video game developer and publisher based in Warsaw. Founded in 2002, originally as a budget-range game company, CI Games is best known for the Sniper: Ghost Warrior and Lords of the Fallen series.

== History ==
City Interactive was founded in 2002 through the merger of three video game companies: Lemon Interactive, We Open Eyes and Tatanka. The company originally acted as a developer and publisher of budget-range games. In 2007, City Interactive merged with Oni Games, a third-party publisher formed alongside City Interactive in 2002, and Detalion Art, an adventure game developer founded by Roland Pantoła, Maciej Miąsik, Danuta Sienkowska, Robert Ożóg, Łukasz Pisarek and Krzysztof Bar, when they left LK Avalon. Also in 2007, City Interactive undertook its initial public offering and became a public company listed on the Warsaw Stock Exchange.

In 2008, City Interactive dropped its budget-range operations, which it wished to underline with the subsequent release of Sniper: Ghost Warrior in 2010. In an interview with magazine MCV, the company stated that the success of the game led them to believe that they had made the right decisions in terms of strategy and product portfolio. By June 2011, City Interactive employed a total of 150 people in its headquarters in Warsaw, its development studios in Rzeszów, Katowice, Poznań and Guildford, and its publishing offices in Germany, the United Kingdom, Canada and the United States. In 2012, City Interactive's development team adopted the name "CI Games", and City Interactive changed its name entirely to CI Games in 2013.

In February 2018, CI Games shrunk its development staff to 30 people. According to chief executive officer Marek Tymiński, the measure had been taken due to many problems having occurred during the production of Sniper Ghost Warrior 3, even though the game itself had surpassed one million copies sold and had turned a profit for the company in the company's 2017 fiscal year by the time the decision was made. In January 2019, CI Games established a new publishing label, United Label, for independent games. United Label is to help fund indie developers in exchange for a share of the games' revenue.

From 2020 through to 2021, the number of CI Games employees increased significantly, with the current team now over 140 people and growing. Around eighty members of staff are directly involved in game production, with forty of those working on Sniper Ghost Warrior Contracts 2, fifty on Lords of the Fallen, and the remainder forming the QA department.

In January 2024, CI Games laid off 10% of its workforce. Lords of the Fallen developer Hexworks and Sniper Ghost Warrior developer Underdog were also affected. Another 30 employees were laid off in May 2024.

== Games ==
=== Games developed ===
Title	Release year
Alien Rage (formerly Alien Fear)	2013
Armed Forces Corp.	2009
Art of Murder: FBI Confidential	2008
Art of Murder 2: Hunt for the Puppeteer	2009
Art of Murder: The Secret Files	2010
Art of Murder 3: Cards of Destiny	2010
Art of Murder: Deadly Secrets	2011
Battlestrike: Force of Resistance (aka Mortyr III in Eastern Europe)	2008
Battlestrike: Road to Berlin (aka WWII: Battlestrike)	2005
Battlestrike: Shadow of Stalingrad (aka Battlestrike: Force of Resistance 2)	2009
Battlestrike: The Siege	2005
Beauty Factory	2007
Brain College: 3 Days ZOO Mystery	2009
Brain College: Aquatica: The sunken city	2009
Brain College: Ancient Quest of Saqqarah	2008
Brain College: Aztec Adventures	2006
Brain College: Blood Ties	2008
Brain College: Call of Atlantis	2008
Brain College: Chinese Temple	2006
Brain College: Coyote's Tales: Sisters of Fire and Water	2009
Brain College: El Dorado Quest	2008
Brain College: Herod's Lost Tomb	2008
Brain College: Lost City of Z	2009
Brain College: Magic Bootique	2009
Brain College: Pharaoh's Mystery	2009
Brain College: Stoneloops of Jurassica	2008
Brain College: The Mystery of the Mary Celeste	2009
Brain College: Tropical Lost Island	2009
Chicken Riot	2010
Chronicles of Mystery: Curse of the Ancient Temple	2009
Chronicles of Mystery: Secret of the Lost Kingdom	2011
Chronicles of Mystery: The Legend of the Sacred Treasure	2010
Chronicles of Mystery: The Scorpio Ritual	2008
Chronicles of Mystery: The Tree of Life	2009
Code of Honor: The French Foreign Legion	2007
Code of Honor 2: Conspiracy Island	2008
Code of Honor 3: Desperate Measures	2009
Combat Wings	2005
Combat Wings: Battle of Britain	2006
Combat Wings: Battle of the Pacific (aka World War II: Pacific Heroes)	2004
Combat Wings: Great Battles of WWII (aka Dogfight 1942)	2012
Combat Zone: Special Forces	2010
Cooking Academy	2008
Cooking Academy 2	2009
Crime Lab: Body of Evidence	2010
Enemy Front	2014
Farm Frenzy	2007
I Love Beauty: Hollywood Makeover	2009
I Love Beauty: Make Up Studio	2008
Jade Rousseau: The Fall of Sant Antonio	2010
Jet Storm: Modern Dogfights (aka Jetfighter 2015)	2005
Jewels of Atlantis	2006
Jewels of the Sahara	2014
Jewels of the Ages	2011
Jewels of Tropical Lost Island	2010
Logic Machines	2010
Lords of the Fallen (2014)	2014
Murder in Venice	2011
Operation Thunderstorm (aka Mortyr IV: Operation Thunderstorm)	2008
Party Designer	2009
Project Freedom (aka Space Interceptor or Starmageddon 2)	2004
Redneck Kentucky and the Next Generation Chickens	2007
Red Baron Ace of the Sky	2004
SAS: Secure Tomorrow	2008
Shutter Island	2010
Smash Up Derby	2003
Sniper: Art of Victory	2007
Sniper: Ghost Warrior	2010
Sniper: Ghost Warrior 2	2013
Sniper Ghost Warrior 3	2017
Sniper Ghost Warrior Contracts	2019
Sniper Ghost Warrior Contracts 2	2021
Sushi Academy	2009
Tank Combat	2007
The Chickenator	2003
The Hell in Vietnam	2007
The Royal Marines Commando	2008
Terrorist Takedown	2004
Terrorist Takedown: Covert Operations	2006
Terrorist Takedown: Payback	2005
Terrorist Takedown: War in Colombia	2006
Terrorist Takedown 2	2008
Terrorist Takedown 3	2010
Vampire Moon: The Mystery of the Hidden Sun	2010
Wings of Honour	2003
Wings of Honour: Battles of the Red Baron	2006
Wolfschanze II	2011
WWII: Pacific Heroes	2004

=== Games published ===
Title	Release year	Developer
Aggression: Reign Over Europe	2007	Lesta Studio
Airborne Troops	2004	Widescreen Games
Alarm for Cobra 11: Crash Time II	2007	Synetic
Alcatraz	2010	Silden
Apassionata	2009	B-Alive
Dark Sector (PC port)	2008	Digital Extremes
Dusk 12: Deadly Zone	2007	Orion Games
Farm Frenzy (Nintendo DSi Port)	2011	Alawar Entertainment
Heat Wave	2009	Nemesys Games
Hidden Target (aka Jonathan Kane: The Protector or The Mark 2)	2009	Gingerbread Studios
Lords of the Fallen	2023	Hexworks
MotorM4X: Offroad Extreme	2008	The Easy Company
Pirate Hunter	2009	ND games, D10 Soft
Pyroblazer	2008	Candella Studios, Eipix Entertainment
RTL Biathlon 2009	2008	49Games
RTL Winter Sports 2009	2008	49Games
SCAR (aka Squadra Corse Alfa Romeo)	2005	Milestone
Specnaz 2	2009	BYTE Software
Street Racer: Europe	2009	Team6 Game Studios
The History Channel: Great Battles of Rome	2007	Slitherine Software
TrackMania Turbo: Build to Race (Nintendo DS port)	2010	Firebrand Games
Ubersoldier II (aka Crimes of War)	2007	Burut Creative Team
Wolfschanze 1944	2011	Calaris
Lords of the Fallen II	2027	Hexworks
