= List of first-person shooters =

This is an index of notable commercial first-person shooter video games, sorted alphabetically by title. The developer, platform, and release date are provided where available. The table can be sorted by clicking on the small boxes next to the column headings.

A first-person shooter game should not be confused with a third-person shooter game, where the camera is positioned behind the player.

== Legend ==
Video game platforms
3DO	3DO	3DS	Nintendo 3DS, 3DS Virtual Console, iQue 3DS	AMI	Amiga
AMI32	Amiga CD32	AmiOS	AmigaOS family, including AmigaOS 4, AROS, and MorphOS	APPII	Apple II
ARC	Acorn Archimedes	Arcade	Arcade video game	ATR	Atari 8-bit computers
ATR26	Atari 2600, Atari 2800	ATRST	Atari ST, Atari Falcon	BSD	Berkeley Software Distribution, OpenBSD or FreeBSD
C64	Commodore 64	CPC	Amstrad CPC	DC	Dreamcast
DOS	PC DOS / MS-DOS, Windows 3.X	DRA	Dragon 32/64	DROID	Android
DS	Nintendo DS, DSiWare, iQue DS	FMT	FM Towns	FOS	Fire OS
GB	Game Boy	GBA	Game Boy Advance, iQue GBA	GCN	GameCube
GCOM	Game.com	GEN	Genesis / Mega Drive	GG	Game Gear
IBM	IBM PC, IBM PC compatible	iOS	iOS, iPhone, iPod, iPadOS, iPad, visionOS, Apple Vision Pro	JAG	Atari Jaguar
LIN	Linux, SteamOS	MAC	Classic Mac OS, 2001 and before	MOBI	Mobile phone
N64	Nintendo 64, iQue Player	NES	Nintendo Entertainment System / Famicom	NeXT	NeXT Computer
NGE	N-Gage	NS	Nintendo Switch	NS2	Nintendo Switch 2
ODY2	Magnavox Odyssey 2	OSX	macOS	PALM	Palm OS
PC88	PC-8800 series	PC98	PC-9800 series	PCE	TurboGrafx-16 / PC Engine
PDS1	Imlac PDS-1	Pippin	Apple Pippin	PLATO	PLATO
PS1	PlayStation 1	PS2	PlayStation 2	PS3	PlayStation 3
PS4	PlayStation 4	PS5	PlayStation 5	PSN	PlayStation Network
PSP	PlayStation Portable	PSV	PlayStation Vita	PSVR	Playstation VR, PlayStation VR2
S32X	32X	SAT	Sega Saturn	SCD	Sega CD / Mega-CD
SNES	Super NES / Super Famicom / Super Comboy	STAR	Xerox Star	TRS80	TRS-80
TZ	Tapwave Zodiac	UNIX	Unix	Wii	Wii, WiiWare, Wii Virtual Console
WiiU	Wii U, WiiU Virtual Console	WIN	Windows, all versions Windows 95 and up	XB360	Xbox 360, Xbox 360 Live Arcade
X68K	X68000	XB	Xbox, Xbox Live Arcade	XBO	Xbox One
XBX/S	Xbox Series X/S	ZX	ZX Spectrum		

== List ==
Initially items sorted alphabetically by "title". The table can be sorted by a different column via clicking on the small box next to column heading.

Title	Year	Platform(s)	Developer	Ref.
007 Legends	2012	WIN, PS3, XB360, WiiU	Eurocom	
007: Agent Under Fire	2001	PS2, XB, GCN	EA Redwood Shores, EA Canada	
007: Nightfire	2002	WIN, PS2, XB, GCN, GBA, OSX	Eurocom, Gearbox Software, JV Games	
007: Quantum of Solace	2008	WIN, PS3, XB360, Wii	Treyarch, Beenox	
007: The World Is Not Enough	2000	N64	Eurocom	
007: The World Is Not Enough	2000	PS1	Black Ops Entertainment	
7554	2011	WIN	Emobi Games	
Ace of Spades	2011	WIN	Ben Aksoy	
Alien Arena	2004	WIN, OSX, LIN, BSD	COR Entertainment	
Alien Breed 3D	1995	AMI, AMI32	Team17	
Alien Breed 3D II: The Killing Grounds	1996	AMI, AMI32	Team17	
Alien Rage	2013	WIN, PS3, XB360	CI Games	
Alien Trilogy	1996	PS1, SAT, DOS	Probe Entertainment	
Alien vs Predator	1994	JAG	Rebellion Developments	
Alien: Resurrection	2000	PS1	Argonaut Games	
Aliens versus Predator	1999	WIN, MAC, OSX	Rebellion Developments	
Aliens versus Predator 2	2001	WIN, OSX	Monolith Productions	
Aliens vs. Predator	2010	WIN, PS3, XB360	Rebellion Developments	
Aliens: Colonial Marines	2013	WIN, PS3, XB360	Gearbox Software	
Alliance of Valiant Arms	2007	WIN	Red Duck Inc.	
Alpha Prime	2006	WIN	Black Element Software	
America's Army	2002	WIN, LIN, OSX (dropped)	United States Army	
Amid Evil	2019	WIN	Indefatigable	
Apex Legends	2019	WIN, PS4, XBO, NS, PS5, XBX/S, iOS, DROID, NS2	Respawn Entertainment	
AquaNox	2001	WIN	Massive Development	
AquaNox 2: Revelation	2003	WIN	Massive Development	
Area 51	2005	WIN, PS2, XB	Midway Studios Austin	
Arma 2	2009	WIN	Bohemia Interactive	
Arma 2: Operation Arrowhead	2010	WIN	Bohemia Interactive	
Arma 3	2013	WIN, OSX, LIN	Bohemia Interactive	
Arma Reforger	2022	WIN, XBX/S, PS5	Bohemia Interactive	
Arma: Armed Assault	2006	WIN	Bohemia Interactive	
Arma: Cold War Assault	2011	WIN	Bohemia Interactive	
Armorines: Project S.W.A.R.M.	1999	N64, PS1	Acclaim Studios London	
Ashen	2004	NGE	Torus Games	
AssaultCube	2008	WIN, LIN, OSX, DROID	Rabid Viper Productions	
Atomfall	2025	WIN, PS4, PS5, XBO, XBX/S	Rebellion Developments	
Atomic Heart	2023	WIN, PS4, PS5, XBO, XBX/S	Mundfish	
Avatar: Frontiers of Pandora	2023	WIN, PS5, XBX/S	Massive Entertainment	
Back 4 Blood	2021	WIN, PS4, PS5, XBO, XBX/S	Turtle Rock Studios	
Back Track	1998	WIN, GBA	JV Games	
Ballistic: Ecks vs. Sever	2002	GBA	Crawfish Interactive	
Battle Frenzy	1994	GEN, SCD	Domark	
Battle: Los Angeles	2011	WIN, PS3, XB360	Saber Interactive	
Battleborn	2016	WIN, PS4, XBO	Gearbox Software	
Battlefield 1	2016	WIN, PS4, XBO	DICE	
Battlefield 1942	2002	WIN, OSX	Digital Illusions CE	
Battlefield 1943	2009	PS3, XB360	DICE	
Battlefield 2	2005	WIN	Digital Illusions CE	
Battlefield 2: Modern Combat	2005	PS2, XB, XB360	DICE	
Battlefield 2042	2021	WIN, PS4, PS5, XBO, XBX/S	DICE	
Battlefield 2142	2006	WIN, OSX	DICE	
Battlefield 3	2011	WIN, PS3, XB360	DICE	
Battlefield 4	2013	WIN, PS3, PS4, XB360, XBO	DICE	
Battlefield 6	2025	WIN, PS5, XBX/S	Battlefield Studios	
Battlefield Hardline	2015	WIN, PS3, PS4, XB360, XBO	Visceral Games	
Battlefield V	2018	WIN, PS4, XBO	DICE	
Battlefield Vietnam	2004	WIN	Digital Illusions Canada	
Battlefield: Bad Company	2008	PS3, XB360	DICE	
Battlefield: Bad Company 2	2010	WIN, PS3, XB360, iOS, DROID, FOS	DICE	
Battleship	2012	PS3, XB360	Double Helix Games	
Battlezone	1980	Arcade	Atari	
Bet On Soldier: Blood Sport	2005	WIN	Kylotonn	
Betrayer	2014	WIN	Blackpowder Games	
BioShock	2007	WIN, XB360, PS3, OSX, iOS, PS4, XBO, NS	Irrational Games	
BioShock 2	2010	WIN, PS3, XB360, OSX, PS4, XBO, NS	2K Marin	
BioShock 2: Minerva's Den	2010	PS3, XB360, WIN, OSX, PS4, XBO, NS	2K Marin	
BioShock Infinite	2013	WIN, PS3, XB360, OSX, LIN, PS4, XBO, NS	Irrational Games	
BioShock Infinite: Burial at Sea	2013	WIN, PS3, XB360, OSX, LIN, PS4, XBO, NS	Irrational Games	
Black	2006	PS2, XB	Criterion Games	
Black Mesa	2012	WIN, LIN	Crowbar Collective	
Blacklight: Retribution	2012	WIN, PS4	Zombie Studios	
Blacklight: Tango Down	2010	WIN, XB360, PS3	Zombie Studios	
BlackSite: Area 51	2007	WIN, PS3, XB360	Midway Studios Austin	
Blake Stone: Aliens of Gold	1993	DOS	JAM Productions	
Blake Stone: Planet Strike	1994	DOS	JAM Productions	
Blood	1997	DOS, WIN, PS4, PS5, XBO, XBX/S, NS, NS2	Monolith Productions	
Blood II: The Chosen	1998	WIN	Monolith Productions	
Blood II: The Chosen – The Nightmare Levels	1999	WIN	Monolith Productions	
Blood: Fresh Supply	2019	WIN	Nightdive Studios	
Blood: Plasma Pak	1997	DOS	Monolith Productions	
Bodycam	2024	WIN	Reissad Studio	
Bodycount	2011	PS3, XB360	Codemasters Guildford	
Boiling Point: Road to Hell	2005	WIN	Deep Shadows	
Borderlands	2009	WIN, PS3, XB360, OSX, PS4, XBO, NS	Gearbox Software	
Borderlands 2	2012	WIN, OSX, PS3, XB360, PSV, LIN, PS4, XBO, DROID, NS	Gearbox Software	
Borderlands 3	2019	WIN, PS4, XBO, OSX, PS5, XBX/S, NS	Gearbox Software	
Borderlands 4	2025	WIN, PS5, XBX/S	Gearbox Software	
Borderlands: The Pre-Sequel	2014	WIN, OSX, LIN, PS3, XB360, PS4, XBO, NS	2K Australia	
Boundary	2023	WIN	Studio Surgical Scalpels	
BRAHMA Force: The Assault on Beltlogger 9	1996	PS1	Genki	
Bram Stoker's Dracula	1993	DOS	TAG	
Breach	2011	WIN, XB360	Atomic Games	
Breakdown	2004	XB	Namco	
Breed	2004	WIN	Brat Designs	
Bright Memory	2019	iOS, DROID, WIN, XBX/S	FYQD Personal Studio	
Bright Memory: Infinite	2021	WIN, PS5, XBX/S, NS, iOS, DROID	FYQD Personal Studio	
Brink	2011	WIN, PS3, XB360	Splash Damage	
Brothers in Arms 2: Global Front	2010	iOS, DROID	Gameloft Romania	
Brothers in Arms: D-Day	2006	PSP	Gearbox Software, Ubisoft Shanghai	
Brothers in Arms: Double Time	2008	Wii, OSX	Gearbox Software	
Brothers in Arms: Earned in Blood	2005	WIN, PS2, XB	Gearbox Software	
Brothers in Arms: Hell's Highway	2008	WIN, PS3, XB360	Gearbox Software	
Brothers in Arms: Road to Hill 30	2005	WIN, PS2, XB	Gearbox Software	
Bulletstorm	2011	WIN, PS3, XB360, PS4, XBO, NS	People Can Fly, Epic Games	
Call of Cthulhu: Dark Corners of the Earth	2005	XB, WIN	Headfirst Productions	
Call of Duty	2003	WIN, OSX, NGE, PS3, XB360	Infinity Ward	
Call of Duty 2	2005	WIN, XB360, OSX	Infinity Ward	
Call of Duty 2: Big Red One	2005	PS2, XB, GCN	Treyarch	
Call of Duty 3	2006	PS2, PS3, XB, XB360, Wii	Treyarch	
Call of Duty 4: Modern Warfare	2007	WIN, OSX, PS3, XB360, DS, OSX, Wii	Infinity Ward	
Call of Duty: Advanced Warfare	2014	WIN, PS3, PS4, XB360, XBO	Sledgehammer Games	
Call of Duty: Black Ops	2010	WIN, PS3, XB360, DS, Wii, OSX	Treyarch	
Call of Duty: Black Ops 4	2018	WIN, PS4, XBO	Treyarch	
Call of Duty: Black Ops 6	2024	WIN, PS4, PS5, XBO, XBX/S	Treyarch, Raven Software	
Call of Duty: Black Ops 7	2025	WIN, PS4, PS5, XBO, XBX/S	Treyarch, Raven Software	
Call of Duty: Black Ops Cold War	2020	WIN, PS4, PS5, XBO, XBX/S	Treyarch, Raven Software	
Call of Duty: Black Ops II	2012	WIN, PS3, XB360, WiiU	Treyarch	
Call of Duty: Black Ops III	2015	WIN, PS3, PS4, XB360, XBO	Treyarch	
Call of Duty: Black Ops: Declassified	2012	PSV	nStigate Games	
Call of Duty: Finest Hour	2004	PS2, XB, GCN	Spark Unlimited	
Call of Duty: Ghosts	2013	WIN, PS3, PS4, XB360, XBO, WiiU	Infinity Ward	
Call of Duty: Infinite Warfare	2016	WIN, PS4, XBO	Infinity Ward	
Call of Duty: Mobile	2019	iOS, DROID	TiMi Studio Group	
Call of Duty: Modern Warfare	2019	WIN, PS4, XBO	Infinity Ward	
Call of Duty: Modern Warfare 2	2009	WIN, PS3, XB360, OSX	Infinity Ward	
Call of Duty: Modern Warfare 2 Campaign Remastered	2020	WIN, PS4, XBO	Beenox	
Call of Duty: Modern Warfare 3	2011	WIN, PS3, XB360, Wii, OSX	Infinity Ward, Sledgehammer Games	
Call of Duty: Modern Warfare 3 – Defiance	2011	DS	n-Space	
Call of Duty: Modern Warfare 4	2026	WIN, PS5, XBX/S, NS2	Infinity Ward	
Call of Duty: Modern Warfare II	2022	WIN, PS4, PS5, XBO, XBX/S	Infinity Ward	
Call of Duty: Modern Warfare III	2023	WIN, PS4, PS5, XBO, XBX/S	Sledgehammer Games	
Call of Duty: Modern Warfare Remastered	2016	WIN, PS4, XBO	Raven Software	
Call of Duty: Modern Warfare: Mobilized	2009	DS	n-Space	
Call of Duty: Roads to Victory	2007	PSP	Amaze Entertainment	
Call of Duty: United Offensive	2004	WIN, OSX	Gray Matter Studios	
Call of Duty: Vanguard	2021	WIN, PS4, PS5, XBO, XBX/S	Sledgehammer Games	
Call of Duty: Warzone	2020	WIN, PS4, XBO	Raven Software, Infinity Ward	
Call of Duty: World at War	2008	WIN, PS3, XB360, DS, Wii	Treyarch	
Call of Duty: World at War – Final Fronts	2008	PS2	Rebellion Developments	
Call of Duty: WWII	2017	WIN, PS4, XBO	Sledgehammer Games	
Call of Juarez	2006	WIN, XB360	Techland	
Call of Juarez: Bound in Blood	2009	WIN, PS3, XB360	Techland	
Call of Juarez: Gunslinger	2013	WIN, PS3, XB360, NS	Techland	
Call of Juarez: The Cartel	2011	WIN, PS3, XB360	Techland	
Carnivores	1998	WIN	Action Forms	
Carnivores 2	1999	WIN	Action Forms	
Carnivores: Cityscape	2002	WIN	Sunstorm Interactive	
Castle Master	1990	AMI, C64, ZX, IBM	Incentive Software	
Catacomb 3-D	1991	DOS	id Software	
Catacomb Abyss	1992	DOS	Softdisk	
Catacomb Apocalypse	1992	DOS	Softdisk	
Catacomb Armageddon	1992	DOS	Softdisk	
Catechumen	2000	WIN	N'Lightning Software Development	
Chaser	2003	WIN	Cauldron	
Chasm: The Rift	1997	DOS, WIN, PS4, PS5, XBO, XBX/S, NS	Action Forms	
Chernobylite	2021	WIN, PS4, XBO, PS5, XBX/S, NS	The Farm 51	
Chex Quest	1996	DOS, WIN	Digital Café	
Chex Quest 2: Flemoids Take Chextropolis	1997	DOS, WIN	Digital Café	
Chex Quest 3	2008	DOS, WIN	Digital Café	
Chex Quest HD	2020	WIN, NS	Team Chex Quest HD, Flight School Studio	
Chrome	2003	WIN	Techland	
Chrome SpecForce	2005	WIN	Techland	
The Chronicles of Riddick: Assault on Dark Athena	2009	WIN, PS3, XB360, OSX	Starbreeze Studios, Tigon Studios	
The Chronicles of Riddick: Escape from Butcher Bay	2004	XB, WIN, PS3, XB360, OSX	Starbreeze Studios, Tigon Studios	
Classified: The Sentinel Crisis	2005	XB	Torus Games	
Clive Barker's Jericho	2007	WIN, PS3, XB360	MercurySteam, Alchemic Productions	
Clive Barker's Undying	2001	WIN, OSX	EA Los Angeles	
Close Combat: First to Fight	2005	WIN, OSX, XB, Wii	Destineer	
Coded Arms	2005	PSP	Konami	
Coded Arms: Contagion	2007	PSP	Creat Studios	
Codename Eagle	1999	WIN	Refraction Games	
Codename MAT	1984	CPC, ZX	Derek Brewster	
Codename MAT II	1985	CPC, C64, ZX	Derek Brewster	
Codename: Outbreak	2001	WIN	GSC Game World	
Cold Winter	2005	PS2	Swordfish Studios	
The Colony	1988	MAC	David Alan Smith	
Combat Arms: Reloaded	2008	WIN	Nexon	
Combat: Task Force 121	2005	WIN, XB	Direct Action Games	
Command & Conquer: Renegade	2002	WIN	Westwood Studios	
Commandos: Strike Force	2006	WIN, PS2, XB	Pyro Studios	
The Conduit	2009	Wii, DROID	High Voltage Software	
Conduit 2	2011	Wii	High Voltage Software	
Conflict: Denied Ops	2008	WIN, PS3, XB360	Pivotal Games	
Congo The Movie: The Lost City of Zinj	1996	SAT	Jumpin Jack	
Consortium	2014	WIN	Interdimensional Games	
Consortium: The Tower	2017	WIN	Interdimensional Games	
Contract J.A.C.K.	2003	WIN	Monolith Productions	
Corporation	1990	AMI, DOS, GEN, ATRST	Synthetic Dimensions	
Corridor 7: Alien Invasion	1994	DOS	Capstone Software	
Counter-Strike	2000	WIN, XB, OSX, LIN	Valve	
Counter-Strike 2	2023	WIN, LIN	Valve	
Counter-Strike: Condition Zero	2004	WIN, OSX, LIN	Ritual Entertainment, Turtle Rock Studios, Valve	
Counter-Strike: Global Offensive	2012	WIN, OSX, PS3, XB360, LIN	Valve, Hidden Path Entertainment	
Counter-Strike: Source	2004	WIN, OSX, LIN	Valve, Turtle Rock Studios	
Crime Boss: Rockay City	2023	WIN, PS5, XBX/S	Ingame Studios	
Crime Crackers	1994	PS1	Media.Vision	
Crossfire	2007	WIN	Smilegate Entertainment	
CrossfireX	2022	XBO, XBX/S	Smilegate Entertainment, Remedy Entertainment	
Cruelty Squad	2021	WIN	Consumer Softproducts	
Cryostasis: Sleep of Reason	2008	WIN	Action Forms	
Cryptic Passage for Blood	1997	DOS	Sunstorm Interactive	
Crysis	2007	WIN, PS3, XB360, NS, PS4, XBO	Crytek	
Crysis 2	2011	WIN, PS3, XB360, PS4, XBO, NS	Crytek	
Crysis 3	2013	WIN, PS3, XB360, PS4, XBO, NS	Crytek	
Crysis Warhead	2008	WIN	Crytek Budapest	
CTU: Marine Sharpshooter	2003	WIN, iOS	Jarhead Games	
Cube 2: Sauerbraten	2004	WIN, LIN, BSD (Free, Open), OSX, UNIX	Wouter van Oortmerssen, Lee Salzman, Mike Dysart	
Cyberdillo	1996	3DO, DOS	Pixel Technologies	
CyberMage: Darklight Awakening	1995	DOS	Origin Systems	
Cyberpunk 2077	2020	WIN, PS4, XBO, PS5, XBX/S, NS2, OSX	CD Projekt RED	
Cyberpunk 2077: Phantom Liberty	2023	WIN, PS5, XBX/S, NS2, OSX	CD Projekt RED	
CyClones	1994	DOS	Raven Software	
Daikatana	2000	WIN, N64	Ion Storm	
Damage Incorporated	1997	MAC, WIN	Paranoid Productions	
Dark Arena	2002	GBA	Graphic State	
Dark Side	1988	AMI, ATRST, CPC, C64, DOS, ZX	Incentive Software	
Darkest of Days	2009	WIN, XB360, OSX	8Monkey Labs	
The Darkness	2007	PS3, XB360	Starbreeze Studios	
The Darkness II	2012	WIN, PS3, XB360, OSX	Digital Extremes	
Darkwatch	2005	PS2, XB	High Moon Studios	
Day of Defeat	2003	WIN, OSX, LIN	Valve	
Day of Defeat: Source	2005	WIN, OSX, LIN	Valve	
Day of the Viper	1989	AMI, ATRST, DOS	Accolade	
Dead Effect	2013	iOS, DROID, WIN, OSX	InDev Brain	
Dead Effect 2	2015	iOS, DROID, WIN, OSX, PS4, XBO, NS	BadFly Interactive	
Dead Island	2011	WIN, PS3, XB360, OSX, LIN, PS4, XBO	Techland	
Dead Island 2	2023	WIN, PS4, PS5, XBO, XBX/S	Dambuster Studios	
Dead Island: Riptide	2013	WIN, PS3, XB360, PS4, XBO, LIN	Techland	
Dead Man's Hand	2004	WIN, XB	Human Head Studios	
Deadfall Adventures	2013	WIN, XB360, PS3	The Farm 51	
Deadly Dozen	2001	WIN	nFusion Interactive	
Deadly Dozen: Pacific Theater	2002	WIN	nFusion Interactive	
Deadly Dozen: Reloaded	2022	WIN, PS4, XONE, NS	N-Fusion Interactive	
Deathloop	2021	WIN, PS5, XBX/S	Arkane Lyon	
Deep Rock Galactic	2018	WIN, XBO, PS4, PS5, XBX/S	Ghost Ship Games	
Defcon 5	1995	DOS, PS1, SAT, 3DO	Millennium Interactive	
Delta Force	2024	WIN, iOS, DROID, PS5, XBX/S	Team Jade	
Delta Force	1998	WIN	NovaLogic	
Delta Force 2	1999	WIN	NovaLogic	
Delta Force: Black Hawk Down	2003	WIN, OSX, PS2, XB	NovaLogic	
Delta Force: Land Warrior	2000	WIN	NovaLogic	
Delta Force: Task Force Dagger	2002	WIN	Zombie Studios	
Delta Force: Urban Warfare	2002	PS1	Rebellion Developments	
Delta Force: Xtreme	2005	WIN	NovaLogic	
Delta Force: Xtreme 2	2009	WIN	NovaLogic	
Dementium II	2010	DS, WIN, OSX	Renegade Kid	
Dementium: The Ward	2007	DS, 3DS, NS, PS4, PS5, WIN	Renegade Kid	
Depth Dwellers	1994	DOS	TriSoft	
Descent	1995	DOS, MAC, PS1	Parallax Software	
Descent II	1996	DOS, MAC, PS1	Parallax Software	
Descent III	1999	WIN, MAC, LIN	Outrage Entertainment	
Despair 3	1995	DOS	U-Neek Software	
Destiny	2014	PS3, PS4, XB360, XBO	Bungie	
Destiny 2	2017	WIN, PS4, XBO, PS5, XBX/S	Bungie	
Deus	1996	DOS, WIN	Silmarils	
Deus Ex	2000	WIN, MAC, PS2, PS4, PS5	Ion Storm	
Deus Ex: Human Revolution	2011	WIN, PS3, XB360, OSX, WiiU	Eidos Montréal	
Deus Ex: Invisible War	2003	WIN, XB	Ion Storm	
Deus Ex: Mankind Divided	2016	WIN, PS4, XBO, LIN, OSX	Eidos Montréal	
Devastation	2003	WIN, LIN	Digitalo Studios	
Devil Daggers	2016	WIN, LIN, OSX	Sorath	
Die Hard: Nakatomi Plaza	2002	WIN	Piranha Games	
Die Hard: Vendetta	2002	GCN, PS2, XB	Bits Studios	
Dishonored	2012	WIN, PS3, XB360, PS4, XBO	Arkane Studios	
Dishonored 2	2016	WIN, PS4, XBO	Arkane Lyon	
Dishonored: Death of the Outsider	2017	WIN, PS4, XBO	Arkane Lyon	
Disruptor	1996	PS1	Insomniac Games	
Doom	1993	Official versions of Doom	id Software	
Doom	2016	WIN, PS4, XBO, NS	id Software	
Doom 3	2004	WIN, LIN, OSX, XB, PS3, XB360, DROID, PS4, XBO, NS	id Software	
Doom 3: Resurrection of Evil	2005	WIN, LIN, XB, PS3, XB360, DROID, PS4, XBO, NS	Nerve Software	
Doom 64	1997	N64, WIN, PS4, XBO, NS	Midway Studios San Diego	
Doom Eternal	2020	WIN, PS4, XBO, NS, PS5, XBX/S	id Software	
Doom II	1994	DOS, WIN, MAC, PC98, PS1, SAT, GBA, TZ, XB360, PS3, PS4, XBO, NS, iOS, DROID, PS5, XBX/S	id Software	
Doom: The Dark Ages	2025	WIN, PS5, XBX/S	id Software	
Dreamkiller	2009	WIN	Mindware Studios	
Driller	1987	AMI, ATRST, CPC, C64, DOS, ZX	Major Developments	
Duke Caribbean: Life's a Beach	1998	DOS	Sunstorm Interactive	
Duke It Out In D.C.	1997	DOS	Sunstorm Interactive	
Duke Nukem 3D	1996	DOS, GCOM, MAC, SAT, N64, PS1, GEN, WIN, XB360, iOS, DROID, OSX, LIN, PS3, PSV, PS4, XBO, NS	3D Realms	
Duke Nukem 3D: Atomic Edition	1996	DOS, MAC	3D Realms	
Duke Nukem Advance	2002	GBA	Torus Games	
Duke Nukem Forever	2011	WIN, PS3, XB360, OSX	Gearbox Software	
Duke: Nuclear Winter	1997	DOS	Simply Silly Software	
Dusk	2018	WIN, LIN, OSX, NS, PS4, XBX/S	David Szymanski	
Dying Light	2015	WIN, LIN, PS4, XBO, OSX, NS	Techland	
Dying Light 2	2022	WIN, PS4, PS5, XBO, XBX/S	Techland	
Dying Light: The Beast	2025	WIN, PS5, XBX/S	Techland	
Dying Light: The Following	2016	WIN, LIN, PS4, XBO, OSX, NS	Techland	
E.Y.E.: Divine Cybermancy	2011	WIN	Streum On Studio	
Earthfall	2018	WIN, PS4, XBO, NS	Holospark	
Ecks vs. Sever	2001	GBA	Crawfish Interactive	
Eldritch	2013	WIN, LIN, OSX	Minor Key Games	
Enemy Front	2014	WIN, PS3, XB360	CI Games	
Enemy Territory: Quake Wars	2007	WIN, LIN, OSX, PS3, XB360	Splash Damage	
Epidemic	1995	PS1	Genki	
Eradicator	1996	DOS	Accolade	
Escape from Monster Manor	1993	3DO	Studio 3DO	
Escape from Tarkov	2017	WIN	Battlestate Games	
Excalibur: Morgana's Revenge	1997	DOS	ExcaliburWorld Software	
Expert	1996	PS1	Nichibutsu	
Extreme Paintbrawl	1998	DOS	Creative Carnage	
F.E.A.R.	2005	WIN, XB360, PS3	Monolith Productions	
F.E.A.R. 2: Project Origin	2009	WIN, PS3, XB360	Monolith Productions	
F.E.A.R. 3	2011	WIN, PS3, XB360	Day 1 Studios	
F.E.A.R. Extraction Point	2006	WIN, XB360	Timegate Studios	
F.E.A.R. Perseus Mandate	2007	WIN, XB360	Timegate Studios	
Fallen Earth	2009	WIN	Icarus Studios, Fallen Earth	
Fallout 3	2008	WIN, PS3, XB360	Bethesda Game Studios	
Fallout 4	2015	WIN, PS4, XBO, PS5, XBX/S, NS2	Bethesda Game Studios	
Fallout 76	2018	WIN, PS4, XBO	Bethesda Game Studios	
Fallout: New Vegas	2010	WIN, PS3, XB360	Obsidian Entertainment	
Far Cry	2004	WIN, PS3, XB360	Crytek	
Far Cry 2	2008	WIN, PS3, XB360	Ubisoft Montreal	
Far Cry 3	2012	WIN, PS3, XB360, PS4, XBO	Ubisoft Montreal	
Far Cry 3: Blood Dragon	2013	WIN, PS3, XB360, PS4, XBO	Ubisoft Montreal	
Far Cry 4	2014	WIN, PS3, PS4, XB360, XBO	Ubisoft Montreal	
Far Cry 5	2018	WIN, PS4, XBO	Ubisoft Montreal, Ubisoft Toronto	
Far Cry 6	2021	WIN, PS4, PS5, XBO, XBX/S	Ubisoft Toronto	
Far Cry Instincts: Evolution	2006	XB, XB360	Ubisoft Montreal	
Far Cry New Dawn	2019	WIN, PS4, XBO	Ubisoft Montreal	
Far Cry Primal	2016	WIN, PS4, XBO	Ubisoft Montreal	
Far Cry: Instincts	2005	XB, XB360	Ubisoft Montreal	
Far Cry: Vengeance	2006	Wii	Ubisoft Montreal	
Final Doom	1996	DOS, WIN, MAC, PS1, PS3	TeamTNT	
The Finals	2023	WIN, PS5, XBX/S, PS4	Embark Studios	
FireStarter	2003	WIN	GSC Game World	
Flying Heroes	2000	WIN	Pterodon; Illusion Softworks	
Forbes Corporate Warrior	1997	WIN	Byron Preiss Multimedia Company	
Forgive Me Father	2022	WIN	Byte Barrel	
Forsaken	1998	WIN, PS1, N64, OSX, LIN, XBO	Probe Entertainment	
Fortnite Ballistic	2024	WIN, PS4, PS5, XBO	Epic Games; Unreal Engine 5	
Fortune's Run	Cancelled	WIN	Team Fortune	
The Fortress of Dr. Radiaki	1994	DOS	Future Visionary, Inc. Maelstrom Software	
Frontlines: Fuel of War	2008	WIN, XB360	Kaos Studios	
Geist	2005	GCN	n-Space	
Generation Zero	2019	WIN, PS4, XBO	Systemic Reaction	
Geograph Seal	1994	X68K	Exact	
Ghost in the Shell: Stand Alone Complex	2005	PSP	G-Artists	
Ghost in the Shell: Stand Alone Complex – First Assault Online	2017	WIN	Neople	
Global Operations	2002	WIN	Barking Dog Studios	
Gloom	1995	AMI, AMI32	Black Magic Software	
Gloom 3	1997	AMI, AMI32	Black Magic Software	
Gods and Generals	2003	WIN	AniVision	
GoldenEye 007	1997	N64, XBO, XBX/S	Rare	
GoldenEye 007	2010	Wii, DS, PS3, XB360	Eurocom, n-Space	
GoldenEye: Rogue Agent	2004	PS2, XB, GCN, DS	EA Los Angeles	
Golgo 13: Top Secret Episode	1988	NES	Vic Tokai	
Gore: Ultimate Soldier	2002	WIN	4D Rulers	
GTFO	2021	WIN	10 Chambers Collective	
Gunbuster	1992	Arcade	Taito	
Gungriffon Blaze	2000	PS2	Game Arts	
Gunman Chronicles	2000	WIN	Rewolf Software	
Gunmetal	1998	DOS, WIN	Mad Genius Software	
H.U.R.L.	1995	DOS	Millennium Media Group	
Hacx: Twitch 'n Kill	1997	DOS	Banjo Software	
Half-Life	1998	WIN, PS2, OSX, LIN	Valve	
Half-Life 2	2004	WIN, XB, XB360, PS3, OSX, LIN, DROID	Valve	
Half-Life 2: Episode One	2006	WIN, XB360, PS3, OSX, LIN, DROID	Valve	
Half-Life 2: Episode Two	2007	WIN, XB360, PS3, OSX, LIN, DROID	Valve	
Half-Life: Alyx	2020	WIN, LIN	Valve	
Half-Life: Blue Shift	2001	WIN, OSX, LIN	Gearbox Software	
Half-Life: Decay	2001	PS2	Gearbox Software	
Half-Life: Opposing Force	1999	WIN, OSX, LIN	Gearbox Software	
Halo 2	2004	XB, WIN, XBO	Bungie	
Halo 3	2007	XB360, XBO, WIN	Bungie	
Halo 3: ODST	2009	XB360, XBO, WIN	Bungie	
Halo 4	2012	XB360, XBO, WIN	343 Industries	
Halo 5: Guardians	2015	XBO	343 Industries	
Halo Infinite	2021	WIN, XBO, XBX/S	343 Industries	
Halo: Campaign Evolved	2026	WIN, PS5, XBX/S	Halo Studios	
Halo: Combat Evolved	2001	XB, WIN, OSX	Bungie	
Halo: Combat Evolved Anniversary	2011	XB360, XBO, WIN	343 Industries	
Halo: Reach	2010	XB360, XBO, WIN	Bungie	
Halo: The Master Chief Collection	2014	XBO, WIN, XBX/S	343 Industries	
Hard Reset	2011	WIN, PS4, XBO	Flying Wild Hog	
Haze	2008	PS3	Free Radical Design	
Heat Project	2003	WIN	DOOBIC Entertainment	
Heavy Bullets	2014	WIN, OSX, LIN	Terri Vellmann	
The Hell in Vietnam	2007	WIN	City Interactive	
Hell Let Loose	2021	WIN, PS5, XBX/S	Expression Games, Cover 6 Studios	
Hellgate: London	2007	WIN	Flagship Studios	
Heretic	1994	DOS, MAC, WIN, PS4, PS5, XBO, XBX/S, NS	Raven Software	
Heretic: Shadow of the Serpent Riders	1996	DOS, WIN, PS4, PS5, XBO, XBX/S, NS	Raven Software	
Hexen II	1997	WIN, MAC	Raven Software	
Hexen II Mission Pack: Portal of Praevus	1998	WIN	Raven Software	
Hexen: Beyond Heretic	1995	DOS, MAC, N64, PS1, SAT, WIN, PS4, PS5, XBO, XBX/S, NS	Raven Software	
Hexen: Deathkings of the Dark Citadel	1996	DOS, WIN, PS4, PS5, XBO, XBX/S, NS	Raven Software	
Hidden & Dangerous	1999	WIN, DC, PS1	Illusion Softworks	
Hidden & Dangerous 2	2003	WIN	Illusion Softworks	
High on Life	2022	WIN, XBO, XBX/S, PS4, PS5, NS, NS2	Squanch Games	
High on Life 2	2026	WIN, PS5, XBX/S	Squanch Games	
The History Channel: Battle for the Pacific	2007	WIN, PS2, PS3, XB360, Wii	Cauldron HQ	
The History Channel: Civil War – A Nation Divided	2006	WIN, PS2, XB360	Cauldron HQ	
History Civil War: Secret Missions	2008	WIN, PS2, PS3, XB360	Cauldron HQ	
Homefront	2011	WIN, PS3, XB360	Kaos Studios	
Homefront: The Revolution	2016	WIN, PS4, XBO	Dambuster Studios	
Horizon V	1982	APPII	Gebelli Software	
Hour of Victory	2007	XB360, WIN	N-Fusion Interactive	
Hovertank 3D	1991	DOS	id Software	
Hrot	2021	WIN	Spytihněv	
Hunt: Showdown	2018	WIN, XBO, PS4, PS5, XBX/S	Crytek	
Hyper Demon	2022	WIN	Sorath	
I.G.I.-2: Covert Strike	2003	WIN	Innerloop Studios	
Ice Nine	2005	GBA	Torus Games	
In Pursuit of Greed	1995	DOS	Mind Shear Software	
Insurgency	2014	WIN, OSX, LIN	New World Interactive	
Insurgency: Sandstorm	2018	WIN, PS4, XBO, PS5, XBX/S	New World Interactive	
Interphase	1989	AMI, DOS, ATRST	The Assembly Line	
Ion Fury	2019	WIN, LIN, PS4, XBO, NS	Voidpoint	
Iron Angel of the Apocalypse	1994	3DO	Synergy Inc.	
Iron Angel of the Apocalypse: The Return	1995	3DO	Synergy Inc.	
Iron Grip: Warlord	2008	WIN	ISOTX	
Iron Storm	2002	WIN, PS2	4X Studio	
Island Peril	1995	DOS	electric fantasies	
Island Saver	2020	WIN, PS4, XBO, NS	Stormcloud Games	
Isle of the Dead	1993	DOS	Rainmaker Software	
Joint Operations: Escalation	2004	WIN	NovaLogic	
Joint Operations: Typhoon Rising	2004	WIN	NovaLogic	
Journey to the Savage Planet	2020	WIN, PS4, PS5, XBO, XBX/S, NS	Typhoon Studios	
Judge Dredd: Dredd Vs. Death	2003	WIN, PS2, XB, GCN	Rebellion Developments	
Juggernaut: The New Story	1998	WIN	Canopy Games	
Jumping Flash!	1995	PS1	Exact, Ultra	
Jumping Flash! 2	1996	PS1	Exact, MuuMuu	
Jurassic: The Hunted	2009	PS2, PS3, XB360, Wii	Cauldron HQ	
Ken's Labyrinth	1993	DOS	Ken Silverman	
Kidō Senshi Z-Gundam: Hot Scramble	1986	NES	Bandai	
Kileak: The DNA Imperative	1995	PS1	Genki	
Killing Floor	2009	WIN, OSX, LIN	Tripwire Interactive	
Killing Floor 2	2016	WIN, PS4, XBO	Tripwire Interactive	
Killing Floor 3	2025	WIN, PS5, XBX/S	Tripwire Interactive	
Killing Time	1995	3DO, WIN, MAC, PS4, PS5, XBO, XBX/S, NS	Studio 3DO	
Killzone	2004	PS2, PS3	Guerrilla Games	
Killzone 2	2009	PS3	Guerrilla Games	
Killzone 3	2011	PS3	Guerrilla Games	
Killzone: Mercenary	2013	PSV	Guerrilla Cambridge	
Killzone: Shadow Fall	2013	PS4	Guerrilla Games	
Kingpin: Life of Crime	1999	WIN, LIN	Xatrix Entertainment	
Kiss: Psycho Circus: The Nightmare Child	2000	WIN, DC	Third Law Interactive	
Kreed	2003	WIN	Burut Creative Team	
Land of the Dead: Road to Fiddler's Green	2005	WIN, XB	Brainbox Games	
Laser Arena	2000	WIN	Trainwreck Studios	
Left 4 Dead	2008	WIN, XB360, OSX	Valve South	
Left 4 Dead 2	2009	WIN, XB360, OSX, LIN	Valve	
Legend of the Seven Paladins	1994	DOS	Accend Inc	
Legendary	2008	WIN, PS3, XB360	Spark Unlimited	
Legends of Might and Magic	2001	WIN	New World Computing	
Lethal Tender	1993	DOS	Pie in the Sky Software	
Lichdom: Battlemage	2014	WIN, PS4, XBO	Xaviant	
Lifeforce Tenka	1997	PS1, WIN	Psygnosis	
Line of Sight: Vietnam	2003	WIN	nFusion Interactive	
Lunicus	1994	MAC, DOS	Cyberflix Incorporated	
M.I.A.: Mission in Asia	2009	WIN	Burut Creative Team	
Mace Griffin: Bounty Hunter	2003	WIN, PS2, XB	Warthog Games	
MAG	2010	PS3	Zipper Interactive	
Magic Carpet	1994	DOS, PS1, SAT	Bullfrog Productions	
Malice	1997	DOS, LIN, MAC, WIN	Ratloop	
Marathon	1994	MAC, Pippin, iOS, WIN, OSX	Bungie	
Marathon	2026	WIN, PS5, XBX/S	Bungie	
Marathon 2: Durandal	1995	MAC, Pippin, WIN, XB360, iOS, OSX	Bungie	
Marathon Infinity	1996	MAC, iOS, WIN, OSX	Bungie	
Master Levels for Doom II	1995	DOS, PS1	id Software	
Maximum Action	2018	WIN	George Mandell	
Maze War	1974	PDS1, MAC, NeXT, PALM, STAR	Steve Colley	
Medal of Honor	1999	PS1	DreamWorks Interactive	
Medal of Honor	2010	WIN, PS3, XB360	Danger Close Games, DICE	
Medal of Honor: Above and Beyond	2020	WIN	Respawn Entertainment	
Medal of Honor: Airborne	2007	WIN, PS3, XB360	EA Los Angeles	
Medal of Honor: Allied Assault	2002	WIN, OSX, LIN	2015	
Medal of Honor: Allied Assault: Breakthrough	2003	WIN, OSX, LIN	TKO Software	
Medal of Honor: Allied Assault: Spearhead	2002	WIN, OSX, LIN	EA Los Angeles	
Medal of Honor: European Assault	2005	PS2, XB, GCN	EA Los Angeles	
Medal of Honor: Frontline	2002	PS2, XB, GCN, PS3	EA Los Angeles	
Medal of Honor: Heroes	2006	PSP	Team Fusion	
Medal of Honor: Heroes 2	2007	Wii, PSP	EA Canada	
Medal of Honor: Pacific Assault	2004	WIN	EA Los Angeles	
Medal of Honor: Rising Sun	2003	PS2, XB, GCN	EA Los Angeles	
Medal of Honor: Underground	2000	PS1, GBA	DreamWorks Interactive, Rebellion Developments	
Medal of Honor: Vanguard	2007	PS2, Wii	EA Los Angeles	
Medal of Honor: Warfighter	2012	WIN, PS3, XB360	Danger Close Games	
Men in Black: The Series – Crashdown	2001	PS1	Runecraft	
Men of Valor	2004	WIN, XB	2015	
Metal Eden	2025	WIN, PS5, XBX/S	Reikon Games	
Metal Head	1995	S32X	Sega	
Metal: Hellsinger	2022	WIN, PS5, XBX/S, PS4, XBO	The Outsiders	
Metro 2033	2010	WIN, XB360, PS4, XBO, LIN, OSX, NS	4A Games	
Metro Exodus	2019	WIN, PS4, XBO, OSX, LIN, PS5, XBX/S	4A Games	
Metro: Last Light	2013	WIN, PS3, XB360, OSX, LIN, PS4, XBO, NS	4A Games	
Metroid Prime	2002	GCN, Wii, NS	Retro Studios	
Metroid Prime 2: Echoes	2004	GCN, Wii	Retro Studios	
Metroid Prime 3: Corruption	2007	Wii	Retro Studios	
Metroid Prime 4: Beyond	2025	NS, NS2	Retro Studios	
Metroid Prime Hunters	2006	DS	Nintendo Software Technology	
Metroid Prime: Federation Force	2016	3DS	Next Level Games	
Metroid Prime: Trilogy	2009	Wii	Retro Studios	
Midair	2018	WIN	Archetype Studios	
MIDI Maze	1987	ATRST, ATR, GB, GG, SNES	Xanth Software F/X	
Midwinter	1989	AMI, DOS, ATRST	Maelstrom Games	
Midwinter II: Flames of Freedom	1991	AMI, DOS, ATRST	Maelstrom Games	
Mission Against Terror	2010	WIN	Kingsoft Dalian JingCai Studio	
Mob Enforcer	2004	WIN, XB	Touchdown Entertainment	
Mobile Forces	2002	WIN	Rage Software	
Moon	2009	DS	Renegade Kid	
Mortal Coil: Adrenalin Intelligence	1995	DOS	Crush Ltd.	
Mortyr 2093-1944	1999	WIN	Mirage Media	
Mothergunship	2018	WIN, PS4, XBO	Grip Digital, Terrible Posture Games	
Mouse: P.I. for Hire	2026	WIN, PS5, XBX/S, NS2	Fumi Games	
NAM	1998	DOS, WIN	TNT Team	
Natural Selection	2002	WIN	Unknown Worlds Entertainment	
Necrodome	1996	WIN	Raven Software	
Necromunda: Hired Gun	2021	WIN, PS4, PS5, XBO, XBX/S	Streum On Studio	
NecroVisioN	2009	WIN	The Farm 51	
NecroVisioN: Lost Company	2010	WIN	The Farm 51	
Neon White	2022	WIN, NS, PS4, PS5, XBO, XBX/S	Angel Matrix	
Nerf Arena Blast	1999	WIN	Visionary Media	
Neuro	2006	WIN	Revolt Games	
Neuro Hunter	2005	WIN	Media Art	
New World Order	2002	WIN	Termite Games	
Nexuiz	2005	LIN, BSD (Free), WIN, OSX, AmiOS	Alientrap	
Nitemare 3D	1994	DOS, WIN	Gray Design Associates	
No Man's Sky	2016	WIN, PS4, XBO, PS5, XBX/S, NS, OSX, NS2	Hello Games	
No One Lives Forever 2: A Spy in H.A.R.M.'s Way	2002	WIN, OSX	Monolith Productions	
Nosferatu: The Wrath of Malachi	2003	WIN	Idol FX	
NRA Gun Club	2006	PS2	Jarhead Games	
Oddworld: Stranger's Wrath	2005	XB, WIN, PS3, PSV, iOS, DROID, OSX, NS, PS4, XBO	Oddworld Inhabitants	
Ominous Horizons: A Paladin's Calling	2001	WIN	N'Lightning Software Development	
Onslaught	2009	Wii	Shade	
Operation Body Count	1994	DOS	Capstone Software	
Operation Flashpoint: Cold War Crisis	2001	WIN, XB, OSX, LIN	Bohemia Interactive Studio	
Operation Flashpoint: Dragon Rising	2009	WIN, PS3, XB360	Codemasters	
Operation Flashpoint: Red River	2011	WIN, PS3, XB360	Codemasters	
Operation: Blockade	2002	Arcade, WIN	Screaming Games	
Operation: Matriarchy	2005	WIN	MADia Entertainment	
The Operative: No One Lives Forever	2000	WIN, PS2, OSX	Monolith Productions	
The Orange Box	2007	WIN, XB360, PS3, OSX, LIN	Valve	
Orion: Prelude	2012	WIN	Spiral Game Studios	
Outcast	1999	WIN	Appeal	
The Outer Worlds	2019	WIN, PS4, XBO, NS, PS5, XBX/S	Obsidian Entertainment	
The Outer Worlds 2	2025	WIN, PS5, XBX/S	Obsidian Entertainment	
Outlaws	1997	WIN, PS4, PS5, XBO, XBX/S, NS	LucasArts	
Outtrigger	1999	Arcade, DC	Sega-AM2	
Overkill's The Walking Dead	2018	WIN	Overkill Software	
Overwatch	2016	WIN, PS4, XBO, NS	Blizzard Entertainment	
Overwatch 2	2022	WIN, PS4, PS5, XBO, XBX/S, NS	Blizzard Entertainment	
Painkiller	2025	WIN, PS5, XBX/S	Anshar Studios	
Painkiller	2004	WIN, XB	People Can Fly	
Painkiller: Battle out of Hell	2004	WIN, XB	People Can Fly	
Painkiller: Hell & Damnation	2012	WIN, PS3, XB360, LIN, OSX	The Farm 51	
Painkiller: Overdose	2007	WIN	Mindware Studios	
Painkiller: Recurring Evil	2012	WIN	Med-Art, Eggtooth	
Painkiller: Redemption	2011	WIN	Eggtooth, Homegrown Games	
Painkiller: Resurrection	2009	WIN	HomeGrown Games	
Paladins: Champions of the Realm	2016	WIN, PS4, XBO, NS	Evil Mojo Games	
Pariah	2005	WIN, XB	Digital Extremes	
Parkan II	2004	WIN	Nikita	
Parkan: Iron Strategy	2001	WIN	Nikita	
Parkan: The Imperial Chronicles	1997	WIN	Nikita	
Pathways into Darkness	1993	MAC	Bungie	
Patriots: A Nation Under Fire	2007	WIN	4D Rulers	
Payday 2	2013	WIN, PS3, XB360, PS4, XBO, LIN, NS	Overkill Software	
Payday 3	2023	WIN, PS5, XBX/S	Starbreeze Studios	
Payday: The Heist	2011	WIN, PS3	Overkill Software	
Pencil Whipped	2001	WIN	ChiselBrain	
Perfect Dark	2010	XB360	4J Studios	
Perfect Dark	2000	N64	Rare	
Perfect Dark Zero	2005	XB360	Rare	
Peter Jackson's King Kong: The Official Game of the Movie	2005	WIN, PS2, XB, XB360, GCN, DS, PSP	Ubisoft Montpellier	
Phantom Fury	2024	WIN, PS5, XBX/S	Slipgate Ironworks	
Phantom Slayer	1982	TRS80, DRA	Med Systems	
PlanetSide	2003	WIN	Sony Online Entertainment	
PlanetSide 2	2012	WIN, PS4	Toadman Interactive	
PlanetSide Arena	2019	WIN	Daybreak Game Company	
PO'ed	1995	3DO, PS1, WIN, PS4, PS5, XBO, XBX/S, NS	Any Channel	
Point Blank	2008	WIN	Zepetto	
Portal	2007	WIN, XB360, PS3, OSX, LIN, DROID, NS	Valve	
Portal 2	2011	WIN, OSX, PS3, XB360, LIN, NS	Valve	
Postal 2	2003	WIN, OSX, LIN	Running with Scissors	
Postal 4: No Regerts	2019	WIN, PS4, PS5	Running with Scissors	
PowerSlave	1996	SAT, DOS, PS1, WIN, OSX, LIN, PS4, XBO, XBX/S, NS	Lobotomy Software	
The Precursors	2009	WIN	Deep Shadows	
Predator: Hunting Grounds	2020	WIN, PS4, PS5, XBX/S	IllFonic	
Prey	2006	WIN, XB360, OSX, LIN	Human Head Studios	
Prey	2017	WIN, PS4, XBO	Arkane Austin	
Prey Invasion	2009	iOS	MachineWorks NorthWest	
Prime Target	1996	MAC	WizardWorks	
Prodeus	2020	WIN, OSX, PS4, PS5, XBO, XBX/S, NS	Bounding Box Software	
Project I.G.I.	2000	WIN	Innerloop Studios	
Project Snowblind	2005	WIN, PS2, XB	Crystal Dynamics	
Project Warlock	2018	WIN, PS4, NS, XBO	Buckshot Software	
Psychotoxic	2004	WIN	NuClearVision Entertainment	
Pulsar: Lost Colony	2021	WIN, OSX, LIN	Leafy Games LLC	
The Punisher: No Mercy	2009	PS3	Zen Studios	
Quake	1996	DOS, WIN, LIN, MAC, SAT, N64, PS4, XBO, NS, PS5, XBX/S	id Software	
Quake 4	2005	WIN, LIN, XB360, OSX	Raven Software	
Quake Champions	2017	WIN	id Software	
Quake II	1997	WIN, LIN, MAC, N64, PS1, XB360, PS4, PS5, XBO, XBX/S, NS	id Software	
Quake II Mission Pack: Ground Zero	1998	WIN	Rogue Entertainment	
Quake II Mission Pack: The Reckoning	1998	WIN	Xatrix Entertainment	
Quake III Arena	1999	WIN, LIN, MAC, DC, PS2, XB360	id Software	
Quake III: Team Arena	2000	WIN	id Software	
Quake Live	2010	WIN, LIN, OSX	id Software	
Quake Mission Pack No. 1: Scourge of Armagon	1997	DOS	Hipnotic Interactive	
Quake Mission Pack No. 2: Dissolution of Eternity	1997	DOS	Rogue Entertainment	
Quest for Bush	2006	WIN	al-Qaeda	
Quest for Saddam	2003	WIN	Petrilla Entertainment	
Quest of Persia: The End of Innocence	2005	WIN	Puya Arts	
Quiver	1997	DOS	ADvertainment Software	
Radix: Beyond the Void	1995	DOS	Neutral Storm Entertainment	
Rage	2011	WIN, PS3, XB360, OSX	id Software	
Rage 2	2019	WIN, PS4, XBO	Avalanche Studios	
Rage: Mutant Bash TV	2010	iOS	id Software	
Raven Squad: Operation Hidden Dagger	2009	WIN, XB360	Atomic Motion	
Ray-Thunder	1991	GB		
Ready or Not	2021	WIN, PS5, XBX/S	VOID Interactive	
Realms of the Haunting	1996	DOS	Gremlin Interactive	
Rebel Moon	1995	WIN	Fenris Wolf Ltd.	
Rebel Moon Rising	1997	WIN	Fenris Wolf Ltd.	
Rec Room	2016	WIN, PS4, PS5, XBO, NS, iOS, DROID	Against Gravity	
Red Babe	1994	DOS	The DaRK CaVErN Productions	
Red Faction	2001	PS2, WIN, OSX, NGE, PS4	Volition	
Red Faction II	2002	PS2, WIN, XB, GCN, PS4	Volition	
Red Ocean	2007	WIN	Collision Studios	
Red Orchestra 2: Heroes of Stalingrad	2011	WIN	Tripwire Interactive	
Red Orchestra: Ostfront 41-45	2006	WIN	Tripwire Interactive	
Red Steel	2006	Wii	Ubisoft Paris	
Red Steel 2	2010	Wii	Ubisoft Paris	
Redfall	2023	WIN, XBX/S	Arkane Austin	
Redline	1999	WIN	Beyond Games	
Redneck Rampage	1997	DOS, MAC	Xatrix Entertainment	
Redneck Rampage Rides Again	1998	DOS	Xatrix Entertainment	
Redneck Rampage: Suckin' Grits on Route 66	1997	DOS	Xatrix Entertainment	
The Regiment	2006	WIN	Kuju London	
Requiem: Avenging Angel	1999	WIN	Cyclone Studios	
Rescue on Fractalus!	1985	ATR, APPII, ZX, CPC, C64	LucasArts	
Resident Evil 7: Biohazard	2017	WIN, PS4, XBO, NS, PS5, XBX/S, OSX, iOS, NS2	Capcom	
Resident Evil Survivor	2000	PS1, WIN	Tose	
Resident Evil Survivor 2 Code: Veronica	2001	Arcade, PS2	Namco, Nextech, SIMS Co., Ltd.	
Resident Evil Village	2021	WIN, PS4, PS5, XBO, XBX/S, OSX, NS, iOS, NS2	Capcom	
Resident Evil: Dead Aim	2003	PS2	Cavia	
Resident Evil: The Darkside Chronicles	2009	Wii, PS3	Capcom, Cavia	
Resident Evil: The Umbrella Chronicles	2007	Wii, PS3	Capcom, Cavia	
Resistance 2	2008	PS3	Insomniac Games	
Resistance 3	2011	PS3	Insomniac Games	
Resistance: Burning Skies	2012	PSV	Nihilistic Software	
Resistance: Fall of Man	2006	PS3	Insomniac Games	
Return to Castle Wolfenstein	2001	WIN, LIN, OSX, PS2, XB	Gray Matter Studios	
Rise of the Triad	2013	WIN	Interceptor Entertainment	
Rise of the Triad	1994	DOS, iOS, WIN, PS4, PS5, XBO, XBX/S, NS	Apogee Software	
Rising Storm	2013	WIN	Tripwire Interactive	
Rising Storm 2: Vietnam	2017	WIN	Antimatter Games, Tripwire Interactive	
RoboCop	2003	WIN, PS2, XB, GCN	Titus Interactive Studio	
RoboCop 3	1991	AMI, ATRST, DOS	Digital Image Design	
RoboCop: Rogue City	2023	WIN, PS5, XBX/S, OSX	Teyon	
Robotica	1995	SAT	Micronet	
Rogue Warrior	2009	WIN, PS3, XB360	Rebellion Developments	
Rust	2013	WIN, OSX, PS4, XBO, PS5, XBX/S	Facepunch Studios	
S.T.A.L.K.E.R. 2: Heart of Chornobyl	2024	WIN, XBX/S, PS5	GSC Game World	
S.T.A.L.K.E.R.: Call of Pripyat	2009	WIN, PS4, XBO, NS, PS5, XBX/S	GSC Game World	
S.T.A.L.K.E.R.: Clear Sky	2008	WIN, PS4, XBO, NS, PS5, XBX/S	GSC Game World	
S.T.A.L.K.E.R.: Shadow of Chernobyl	2007	WIN, PS4, XBO, NS, PS5, XBX/S	GSC Game World	
Sanctum	2011	WIN, OSX	Coffee Stain Studios	
Sanctum 2	2013	WIN, OSX, LIN, XB360, PS3	Coffee Stain Studios	
SAS: Secure Tomorrow	2008	WIN	City Interactive	
Savage 2: A Tortured Soul	2008	LIN, OSX, WIN	S2 Games	
Savage: The Battle for Newerth	2003	LIN, OSX, WIN	S2 Games	
Scorn	2022	WIN, XBX/S, PS5	Ebb Software	
Scorpion: Disfigured	2009	WIN	B-Cool Interactive	
Secret Service	2001	WIN	Fun Labs	
Secret Service	2008	WIN, PS2, XB360	Cauldron HQ	
Secret Service 2: Security Breach	2003	WIN	4D Rulers	
Section 8	2009	WIN, XB360, PS3	TimeGate Studios	
Section 8: Prejudice	2011	WIN, PS3, XB360	TimeGate Studios	
Sensory Overload	1994	MAC	Reality Bytes	
Serious Sam II	2005	WIN, XB	Croteam	
Serious Sam 3: BFE	2011	WIN, OSX, LIN, XB360, PS3, PS4, XBO, NS	Croteam	
Serious Sam 4	2020	WIN, PS5, XBX/S	Croteam	
Serious Sam Advance	2004	GBA	Climax London	
Serious Sam: Next Encounter	2004	PS2, GCN	Climax Solent	
Serious Sam: Siberian Mayhem	2022	WIN, PS5, XBX/S	Timelock Studio, Croteam	
Serious Sam: The First Encounter	2001	WIN, XB, XB360, LIN, PS4, XBO, NS	Croteam	
Serious Sam: The Second Encounter	2002	WIN, XB, XB360, LIN, PS4, XBO, NS	Croteam	
Shadow Ops: Red Mercury	2004	XB, WIN	Zombie Studios	
Shadow Warrior	1997	DOS, MAC, WIN, iOS, OSX, LIN, DROID	3D Realms	
Shadow Warrior	2013	WIN, PS4, XBO, OSX, LIN	Flying Wild Hog	
Shadow Warrior 2	2016	WIN, PS4, XBO	Flying Wild Hog	
Shadow Warrior 3	2022	WIN, PS4, XBO, PS5, XBX/S	Flying Wild Hog	
Shadowrun	2007	WIN, XB360	FASA Interactive	
Shattered Horizon	2009	WIN	Futuremark Games Studio	
Shellshock 2: Blood Trails	2009	WIN, PS3, XB360	Rebellion Derby	
The Ship	2006	WIN	Outerlight	
Shogo: Mobile Armor Division	1998	WIN, MAC, LIN, AMI	Monolith Productions	
Silent Debuggers	1991	PCE, Wii	Data East	
SiN	1998	WIN, LIN, MAC	Ritual Entertainment	
Sin Episodes: Emergence	2006	WIN	Ritual Entertainment	
Singularity	2010	WIN, PS3, XB360	Raven Software	
Slaygon	1988	AMI, ATRST	John Conley, James Oxley	
Smokin' Guns	2009	LIN, OSX, WIN	Smokin' Guns Productions, Iron Claw Interactive	
Sniper Ghost Warrior 3	2017	WIN, PS4, XBO	CI Games	
Sniper Ghost Warrior Contracts	2019	WIN, PS4, XBO	CI Games	
Sniper Ghost Warrior Contracts 2	2021	WIN, PS4, XBO, XBX/S, PS5	CI Games	
Sniper: Art of Victory	2008	WIN	City Interactive	
Sniper: Ghost Warrior	2010	WIN, XB360, PS3	City Interactive	
Sniper: Ghost Warrior 2	2013	WIN, PS3, XB360	City Interactive	
Solarix	2015	WIN	Pulsetense Games	
Soldier of Fortune	2000	WIN, LIN, DC, PS2	Raven Software	
Soldier of Fortune II: Double Helix	2002	WIN, OSX, XB	Raven Software	
Soldier of Fortune: Payback	2007	WIN, PS3, XB360	Cauldron HQ	
Söldner: Secret Wars	2004	WIN	Wings Simulations	
SoulTrap	1996	WIN	Microforum International	
South Park	1998	N64, WIN, PS1	Iguana Entertainment	
Space Hulk	1993	AMI, DOS	Electronic Arts	
Space Hulk: Deathwing	2016	WIN, PS4	Streum On Studio	
Space Hulk: Vengeance of the Blood Angels	1995	3DO, PS1, SAT, WIN	Key Game	
Spasim	1974	PLATO	Jim Bowery	
Spear of Destiny	1992	DOS	id Software	
Spec Ops II: Green Berets	1999	WIN, DC	Zombie Studios	
Spec Ops: Ranger Team Bravo	1998	WIN	Zombie Studios	
Spec Ops: Rangers Lead the Way	1998	WIN	Zombie Studios	
Special Force	2003	WIN	Hadeel, Hezbollah Central Internet Bureau	
Special Force 2: Tale of the Truthful Pledge	2007	WIN	Might 3D, Hezbollah Central Internet Bureau	
Special Operation 85: Hostage Rescue	2007	WIN	Association of Islamic Unions of Students	
Splat Magazine Renegade Paintball	2005	WIN, XB	Global Star Software	
Splitgate	2019	WIN, LIN, PS4, PS5, XBO, XBX/S	1047 Games	
Splitgate 2	2025	WIN, PS4, PS5, XBO, XBX/S	1047 Games	
The Stalin Subway	2005	WIN	G5 Software, Orion Games	
The Stalin Subway: Red Veil	2006	WIN	G5 Software, Orion Games	
Star Citizen	2017	WIN	Cloud Imperium Games	
Star Cruiser	1988	PC88, PC98, X68K, GEN	Arsys Software	
Star Cruiser 2	1992	PC98, FMT	Arsys Software	
Star Luster	1985	NES, Arcade, X68K, Wii	Namco	
Star Raiders	1979	ATR	Atari	
Star Raiders II	1986	ATR, CPC, C64, DOS, ZX	Atari Corp.	
Star Ship	1977	ATR26	Atari	
Star Trek	1982	Arcade	Sega	
Star Trek Generations	1997	WIN	MicroProse	
Star Trek: Elite Force II	2003	WIN, OSX	Ritual Entertainment	
Star Trek: The Next Generation: Klingon Honor Guard	1998	WIN, MAC	MicroProse	
Star Trek: Voyager – Elite Force	2000	WIN, MAC, PS2	Raven Software	
Star Wars	1983	Arcade	Atari	
Star Wars Battlefront	2015	WIN, PS4, XBO	DICE	
Star Wars Battlefront II	2017	WIN, PS4, XBO	DICE	
Star Wars Jedi Knight II: Jedi Outcast	2002	WIN, OSX, XB, GCN, PS4, NS	Raven Software	
Star Wars Jedi Knight: Dark Forces II	1997	WIN	LucasArts	
Star Wars Jedi Knight: Jedi Academy	2003	WIN, OSX, XB, PS4, NS	Raven Software	
Star Wars Jedi Knight: Mysteries of the Sith	1998	WIN	LucasArts	
Star Wars: Battlefront	2004	WIN, PS2, XB, OSX, MOBI, PS4, PS5, XBO, XBX/S, NS	Pandemic Studios	
Star Wars: Battlefront II	2005	WIN, PS2, XB, PSP, PS4, PS5, XBO, XBX/S, NS	Pandemic Studios	
Star Wars: Dark Forces	1995	DOS, MAC, PS1, WIN, PS4, PS5, XBO, XBX/S, NS	LucasArts	
Star Wars: Republic Commando	2005	WIN, XB, PS4, NS	LucasArts	
Star Wars: The Empire Strikes Back	1985	Arcade	Atari	
Starfield	2023	WIN, XBX/S, PS5	Bethesda Game Studios	
Starfox	1987	CPC, C64, ZX	Realtime Games Software	
Starship Troopers	2005	WIN	Strangelite	
Starship Troopers: Extermination	2023	WIN, PS5, XBX/S	Offworld	
Starsiege: Tribes	1998	WIN	Dynamix	
Stellar 7	1983	APPII, C64	Damon Slye	
Strafe	2017	WIN, OSX, PS4, LIN	Pixel Titans	
Strife: Quest for the Sigil	1996	DOS, WIN, OSX, LIN, NS	Rogue Entertainment	
Submarine Commander	1982	ATR	Thorn EMI Computer Software	
The Suffering	2004	PS2, XB, WIN	Surreal Software	
The Suffering: Ties That Bind	2005	WIN, PS2, XB	Surreal Software	
The Sum of All Fears	2002	WIN, PS2, GCN	Red Storm Entertainment	
Super 3D Noah's Ark	1994	SNES, DOS	Wisdom Tree	
The Super Spy	1990	Arcade	SNK	
Superhot	2016	WIN, OSX, LIN, XBO, PS4, NS	Superhot Team	
Superhot: Mind Control Delete	2020	WIN, PS4, XBO	Superhot Team	
SWAT 3: Close Quarters Battle	1999	WIN	Sierra Northwest	
SWAT 4	2005	WIN	Irrational Games	
SWAT: Global Strike Team	2003	PS2, XB	Argonaut Games	
Syndicate	2012	WIN, PS3, XB360	Starbreeze Studios	
System Shock	2023	WIN, PS4, PS5, XBO, XBX/S, NS, NS2	Nightdive Studios	
System Shock	1994	DOS, MAC, PC98, WIN	Looking Glass Studios	
System Shock 2	1999	WIN, OSX, LIN, PS4, PS5, XBO, XBX/S, NS, NS2	Irrational Games, Looking Glass Studios	
Tactical Ops: Assault on Terror	2002	WIN	Kamehan Studios	
Tau Ceti	1985	ATRST, CPC, C64, DOS, ZX	CRL Group	
Team Fortress	1999	WIN	Team Fortress Software	
Team Fortress 2	2007	WIN, XB360, PS3, OSX, LIN	Valve	
Team Fortress Classic	1999	WIN, OSX, LIN	Valve	
Terminal Terror	1994	DOS	Pie in the Sky Software	
The Terminator	1991	DOS	Bethesda Softworks	
The Terminator 2029	1992	DOS	Bethesda Softworks	
Terminator 3: Rise of the Machines	2003	PS2, XB	Black Ops Entertainment	
Terminator 3: War of the Machines	2003	WIN	Clever's Games	
The Terminator: Future Shock	1995	DOS	Bethesda Softworks	
The Terminator: Rampage	1993	DOS	Bethesda Softworks	
Terminator: Resistance	2019	WIN, PS4, XBO, PS5, XBX/S	Teyon	
The Terminator: SkyNET	1996	DOS	Bethesda Softworks	
Terra Nova: Strike Force Centauri	1996	DOS	Looking Glass Studios	
Terrawars: New York Invasion	2006	WIN	Ladyluck Digital Media	
Terror Attack: Project Fateh	2010	iOS, MOBI, WIN	Shivam Sai Gupta	
Terror In Christmas Town	1995	DOS	Michael Zerbo	
Terrorist Takedown 2	2007	WIN	City Interactive	
Testament	1996	AMI	Insanity	
TimeShift	2007	WIN, PS3, XB360	Saber Interactive	
TimeSplitters	2000	PS2, PS4, PS5	Free Radical Design	
TimeSplitters 2	2002	PS2, XB, GCN, PS4, PS5	Free Radical Design	
TimeSplitters: Future Perfect	2005	PS2, XB, GCN, PS4, PS5	Free Radical Design	
Tiny Tina's Wonderlands	2022	WIN, PS4, PS5, XBO, XBX/S	Gearbox Software	
Titanfall	2014	WIN, XB360, XBO	Respawn Entertainment	
Titanfall 2	2016	WIN, PS4, XBO	Respawn Entertainment	
Tom Clancy's Ghost Recon	2001	WIN, MAC, PS2, XB, GCN	Red Storm Entertainment	
Tom Clancy's Ghost Recon Advanced Warfighter	2006	WIN, PS2, XB, XB360	Red Storm Entertainment, Ubisoft Paris	
Tom Clancy's Ghost Recon Advanced Warfighter 2	2007	WIN	GRIN	
Tom Clancy's Rainbow Six	1998	WIN, MAC, PS1, N64, DC	Red Storm Entertainment	
Tom Clancy's Rainbow Six 3	2003	XB, PS2, GCN	Ubisoft Montreal	
Tom Clancy's Rainbow Six 3: Black Arrow	2004	XB	Ubisoft Milan	
Tom Clancy's Rainbow Six 3: Raven Shield	2003	WIN, OSX	Red Storm Entertainment, Ubisoft Montreal	
Tom Clancy's Rainbow Six Extraction	2022	WIN, PS4, XBO, PS5, XBX/S	Ubisoft Montreal	
Tom Clancy's Rainbow Six: Critical Hour	2006	XB	Ubisoft Quebec	
Tom Clancy's Rainbow Six: Lockdown	2005	PS2, XB, GCN, WIN	Red Storm Entertainment	
Tom Clancy's Rainbow Six: Lone Wolf	2002	PS1	Rebellion Developments, Red Storm Entertainment	
Tom Clancy's Rainbow Six: Rogue Spear	1999	WIN, DC, MAC, PS1	Red Storm Entertainment	
Tom Clancy's Rainbow Six: Siege	2015	WIN, PS4, XBO, PS5, XBX/S	Ubisoft Montreal	
Tom Clancy's Rainbow Six: Take-Down – Missions in Korea	2001	WIN	Kama Digital Entertainment	
Tom Clancy's Rainbow Six: Vegas	2006	WIN, XB360, PS3, PSP	Ubisoft Montreal	
Tom Clancy's Rainbow Six: Vegas 2	2008	WIN, PS3, XB360	Ubisoft Montreal	
Total Eclipse	1988	ATRST, AMI, DOS, C64, ZX, CPC	Incentive Software	
Total Eclipse II: The Sphinx Jinx	1991	ATRST, AMI, DOS, C64, ZX, CPC	Incentive Software	
Tower of Guns	2014	WIN	Terrible Posture Games	
Trepang2	2023	WIN, PS5, XBX/S	Trepang Studios	
Trespasser	1998	WIN	DreamWorks Interactive	
Tribes 2	2001	LIN, WIN	Dynamix	
Tribes: Aerial Assault	2002	PS2	Inevitable Entertainment	
Tribes: Ascend	2012	WIN	Hi-Rez Studios	
Tribes: Vengeance	2004	WIN	Irrational Games	
Tron 2.0	2003	WIN, OSX, XB	Monolith Productions	
The Truth About 9th Company	2008	WIN	Extreme Developers; Kranx Productions	
Tunnel Rats: 1968	2009	WIN	Replay Studios	
Turning Point: Fall of Liberty	2008	WIN, PS3, XB360	Spark Unlimited	
Turok	2008	PS3, XB360, WIN	Propaganda Games	
Turok 2: Seeds of Evil	1998	N64, WIN, XBO, LIN, OSX, NS, PS4, PS5, XBX/S	Iguana Entertainment	
Turok 3: Shadow of Oblivion	2000	N64, WIN, PS4, PS5, XBO, XBX/S, NS	Acclaim Studios Austin	
Turok: Dinosaur Hunter	1997	N64, WIN, OSX, XBO, LIN, NS, PS4, PS5, XBX/S	Iguana Entertainment	
Turok: Evolution	2002	PS2, XB, GCN, WIN	Acclaim Studios Austin	
Turok: Rage Wars	1999	N64	Acclaim Studios Austin	
ÜberSoldier	2005	WIN	Burut Creative Team	
ÜberSoldier II	2008	WIN	Burut Creative Team	
UberStrike	2008	WIN, iOS	Cmune	
The Ultimate Doom	1995	DOS, MAC, PS1, SAT	id Software	
Ultrakill	2020	WIN	Arsi "Hakita" Patala	
Under Siege	2005	WIN	Afkar Media	
Unreal	1998	WIN, MAC	Epic MegaGames, Digital Extremes	
Unreal Championship	2002	XB	Epic Games, Digital Extremes	
Unreal Championship 2: The Liandri Conflict	2005	XB	Epic Games	
Unreal II: The Awakening	2003	WIN, XB	Legend Entertainment	
Unreal Mission Pack: Return to Na Pali	1999	WIN, MAC	Legend Entertainment	
Unreal Tournament	1999	WIN, LIN, MAC, PS2, DC	Epic Games, Digital Extremes	
Unreal Tournament 2003	2002	WIN, OSX, LIN	Epic Games, Digital Extremes	
Unreal Tournament 2004	2004	WIN, LIN, OSX	Epic Games, Digital Extremes	
Unreal Tournament 3	2007	WIN, PS3, XB360	Epic Games	
Urban Chaos: Riot Response	2006	PS2, XB	Rocksteady Studios	
Urban Terror	2000	LIN, OSX, WIN	FrozenSand, LLC; Silicon Ice Development	
US Special Forces: Team Factor	2002	WIN	7FX	
Valorant	2020	WIN, PS5, XBX/S	Riot Games	
Vietcong	2003	WIN, PS2, XB	Pterodon, Illusion Softworks	
Vietcong 2	2005	WIN	Pterodon, Illusion Softworks	
Vivisector: Beast Inside	2005	WIN	Action Forms	
Void Bastards	2019	WIN, XBO, PS4, NS	Blue Manchu	
The Walking Dead: Survival Instinct	2013	WIN, PS3, XB360, WiiU	Terminal Reality	
Warface	2013	WIN, XB360, PS4, XBO, NS	Crytek Kiev	
Warhammer 40,000: Boltgun	2023	WIN, PS4, PS5, XBO, XBX/S, NS	Auroch Digital	
Warhammer 40,000: Darktide	2022	WIN, XBX/S, PS5	Fatshark	
Warhammer 40,000: Fire Warrior	2003	WIN, PS2	Kuju Entertainment	
Warhammer: End Times – Vermintide	2015	WIN, PS4, XBO	Fatshark	
Warhammer: Vermintide 2	2018	WIN, PS4, XBO	Fatshark	
WarPath	2006	WIN, XB	Digital Extremes	
Warsow	2005	WIN, OSX, LIN	Warsow Team	
Water Warfare	2009	Wii	Hudson Soft	
Westworld 2000	1996	WIN	Brooklyn Multimedia	
The Wheel of Time	1999	WIN	Legend Entertainment	
White Gold: War in Paradise	2008	WIN	Deep Shadows	
White Law	2003	WIN	Resistance Records	
Will Rock	2003	WIN	Saber Interactive	
William Shatner's TekWar	1995	DOS	Capstone Software	
Witchaven	1995	DOS	Capstone Software	
Witchaven II: Blood Vengeance	1996	DOS	Capstone Software	
Witchfire	2023	WIN	The Astronauts	
Wolfenstein	2009	WIN, PS3, XB360	Raven Software	
Wolfenstein 3D	1992	DOS, Arcade, PC98, SNES, JAG, MAC, ARC, 3DO, APPII, GBA, WIN, LIN, iOS, PS3, XB360, DROID	id Software	
Wolfenstein II: The New Colossus	2017	WIN, PS4, XBO, NS	MachineGames	
Wolfenstein: Enemy Territory	2003	LIN, WIN, OSX	Splash Damage	
Wolfenstein: The New Order	2014	WIN, PS3, PS4, XB360, XBO	MachineGames	
Wolfenstein: The Old Blood	2015	WIN, PS4, XBO	MachineGames	
Wolfenstein: Youngblood	2019	WIN, PS4, XBO, NS	MachineGames, Arkane Lyon	
World War II Combat: Iwo Jima	2006	WIN, XB	Direct Action Games	
World War II Combat: Road to Berlin	2006	WIN, XB	Direct Action Games	
World War II GI	1999	DOS, WIN	TNT Team	
World War II Online	2001	WIN, OSX	Cornered Rat Software	
World War Z	2013	DROID, iOS	Phosphor Games	
Wrack	2014	WIN	Final Boss Entertainment	
Wrath: Aeon of Ruin	2019	WIN, OSX, LIN, PS4, XBO, NS	KillPixel, Slipgate Ironworks	
X-Men: The Ravages of Apocalypse	1997	DOS, LIN, MAC, WIN	Zero Gravity Entertainment	
XDefiant	2024	WIN, PS5, XBX/S	Ubisoft San Francisco	
Xenomorph	1990	DOS, AMI, ATRST, C64	Pandora	
XIII	2020	WIN, PS4, XBO, PS5, XBX/S, NS	PlayMagic	
XIII	2003	WIN, PS2, XB, GCN, OSX	Ubisoft Paris	
Xonotic	2011	LIN, OSX, WIN	Team Xonotic	
Xotic	2011	WIN, XB360	WXP Games	
XS	1996	DOS, WIN	SCi Games	
You Are Empty	2006	WIN	Mandel ArtPlains, Digital Spray Studios	
Zaero	1998	WIN	Team Evolve	
Zeno Clash	2009	WIN, XB360	ACE Team	
Zeno Clash II	2013	WIN, PS3, XB360	ACE Team	
Zero Tolerance	1994	GEN	Technopop	
Ziggurat	2014	WIN, OSX, LIN, XBO, PS4, WiiU, NS	Milkstone Studios	
ZombiU	2012	WiiU, WIN, PS4, XBO	Ubisoft Montpellier	
ZPC	1996	WIN	Zombie Studios	

== See also ==
- List of freeware first-person shooters
- Chart of first-person shooters by release year and graphics engine
- List of third-person shooters
