= Coded Arms: Assault =

Coded Arms Assault
- Developer(s): Konami
- Publisher(s): Konami
- Platform(s): PlayStation 3
- Release: Cancelled
- Genre(s): First-person shooter
- Mode(s): Single-player, multiplayer

Coded Arms: Assault was a first-person shooter for the PlayStation 3 which was being developed by Konami. It is a sequel to Coded Arms for the PlayStation Portable, but does not have any relation to it or the direct sequel, Coded Arms: Contagion storywise.

== History ==
It was first announced at the Sony E3 2006 Press Conference, where it was revealed that the game would support 16-player online multiplayer matches.

The trailer showed a number of shots of the environment transforming. A lot of computer code faded into a full city landscape as the camera panned around the lead character. This could be indicative of the game once again including randomly generated environments, though no information that specific has been given.

=== Cancellation ===
The game was confirmed to be cancelled by Konami. A Konami representative released the statement "There are no current plans to bring Coded Arms: Assault to the PS3 at this time."

== Plot ==
The game starts in an alternate 2015 when a Japanese company name Ashihara created a virtual reality network where players can connect to the network by using a connection known as "PC.drug". An unknown player received a message from an anonymous source named "Enigma" to infiltrate a database named "Kagura" in order to steal Ashihara data.
