= Parkan: The Imperial Chronicles =

1997 video game

- Cover art for Parkan: The Imperial Chronicles
- Developer: Nikita
- Publisher: Nikita
- Platform: Windows
- Release: September 1, 1997
- Mode: Single-player

Parkan: The Imperial Chronicles (Russian: Паркан: Хроника Империи) is a space simulation computer game developed by Russian company Nikita and released in September 1997 for Windows. The game is a hybrid title that combines elements of space simulation, first-person shooter, and economic strategy genres. Set in the year 4097 in the Lentis sector, the player controls the pilot of an Imperial raider called "Parkan," sent on a mission to search for the missing research vessel "Wanderer."

The game was developed from February 1994 to August 1997, led by Nikita Skripkin and lead designer Oleg Kostin. The developers designed the game to provide extensive player freedom within a detailed three-dimensional space environment with its own operational mechanics. During development, the game underwent several significant revisions, including the replacement of all sprites in the simulator with three-dimensional models shortly before release.

Parkan: The Imperial Chronicles was largely well-received by Russian media, with critics praising its original concept, deep gameplay mechanics, and technical execution comparable to contemporary Western games. Outside Russia, reception was more reserved, with reviewers noting the game's ambitious design while pointing to outdated visuals and monotonous gameplay as weaknesses. The success of the game resulted in a franchise that spawned sequels including Parkan: Iron Strategy and Parkan 2.

== Gameplay ==
Parkan: The Imperial Chronicles is a hybrid game that combines elements of space flight simulation, first-person shooter, and economic strategy. The game is set in the year 4097 in the Lentis sector, which is cut off from the rest of the Galaxy. The player is a pilot of the "Parkan" Imperial raider, who has been sent to search for the missing research vessel named "Wanderer". At the beginning of the game, Parkan crashes, losing its hyperdrive (jumper), communication capabilities with base, and some equipment. The player's first objective is to find and recover the jumper, which is necessary for making interstellar jumps.

Parkan’s game world is procedurally generated at the start of each new playthrough. The Lentis sector consists of five star clusters, each containing multiple star groups with their own stars and planetary systems. While the world is randomly generated, resources are distributed evenly to provide balanced starting conditions. The sector is populated by robots organized into five clans, each made up of a single robot type, along with a separate pirate clan that operates outside normal rules. Fuel acts as the universal currency, used both for interstellar travel and for robot functions.

The main story follows the search for the missing research ship Wanderer and the investigation of anomalies in the Lentis sector. Players must collect pieces of the ship’s distress beacon, scattered across different planets and systems. Clues about their locations can be obtained through computer terminals at bases or by docking with cargo ships. Because the world progresses in real time, information can become outdated; an artifact may be moved from a planet before the player arrives, requiring further searching. All major data is automatically recorded by the ship’s onboard computers.

=== Space flight simulation ===
In space flight simulation mode, the player controls the Parkan, traveling between planets and star systems while engaging in combat. The ship is equipped with various systems including weapons, shields, engines, and radar, whose effectiveness depends on energy distribution. The power system can operate a maximum of two systems at full capacity simultaneously, requiring players to constantly redistribute energy based on tactical requirements. The ship's arsenal includes hull-mounted guns of several types, two kinds of missiles, mines, and combat drones. Drones function as autonomous fighters that can be deployed to attack enemies or recalled to the ship. The most advanced drone models are capable of conducting combat operations independently.

=== First-person shooter ===
When landing on a planet or docking with another ship, the game switches to a first-person shooter mode in which the player controls the pilot wearing a combat exosuit. This mode is used for exploring bases, spaceports, and enemy vessels, communicating with robots, trading, and completing missions. The combat suit provides protection against radiation, biological, and chemical hazards. Arsenal includes a laser, machine gun, bazooka, and rocket launcher. Each base has its own style of architecture and contains facilities such as storage areas, power systems, housing, mines, and factories. Some planets also feature subway systems linking parts of the colony. At the center of each base is a computer terminal where trading is carried out, missions are received, and information is accessed.

=== Economic strategy ===
The game’s economic system allows players to trade, complete missions, and establish colonies. Players can choose different approaches, such as working as mercenaries on clan missions, engaging in barter trade, setting up mining colonies, or becoming pirates. To found a colony, a player must either discover an unoccupied planet with enough resources or capture an existing base. After the planet is populated with "robot embryos", the colony develops automatically. Colony efficiency can be improved by increasing the robot population and assigning them professions using special cartridges: geologists to operate mines, engineers to build factories, and scientists to create orbital fighters.

== Development ==
Parkan: The Imperial Chronicles was developed by the Russian company Nikita from February 1994 to August 1997, lasting over three years. The project was led by company director Nikita Skripkin, with Oleg Kostin as lead designer and head of 3D modeling. The first public details about the game appeared in late 1996, when it had reached the alpha testing stage.

According to the developers, the game was intended to give players extensive freedom and present a realistic three-dimensional space environment with detailed mechanics. They described Parkan as a hybrid of several genres, calling it a "first-person strategy." Oleg Kostin stated that the design of the Parkan spacecraft was inspired by Project 705 submarines, known for their small crews and strong stealth capabilities. During development, the game underwent major changes: graphics were updated, gameplay mechanics were revised, and only weeks before its public presentation, all sprites in the simulator were replaced with three-dimensional models.

Parkan: The Imperial Chronicles was released on September 1, 1997. After launch, the developers issued a patch adding support for 3D accelerators and joysticks, along with various gameplay improvements. The game’s success led to a series set in the same universe, including Parkan: Iron Strategy and Parkan 2.

== Reception ==
Reception

Review scores
| Publication | Score |
|---|---|
| Master Games | 6 / 10 |
| Bonusweb | 4 / 10 |
| PC Joker | 22% |
| Game.EXE | 94 % |
| Game World Navigator | 7 / 10 |
| Strana Igr | 8 / 10; 7 / 10 (3DX) |

The game's concept was positively received by critics. Alexander Landa of Game World Navigator described Parkan as "a serious competitive product on the level of Western releases." Boris Romanov of Strana Igr emphasized its importance for the Russian gaming industry in 1997 and praised the freedom of gameplay strategies. Alexander Vershinin of Game.EXE compared it to Wing Commander and Privateer, while pointing out original features such as the drone system. Vyacheslav Alpatov of Domashiy Kompyuter called it "a complex blend of strategy, arcade, quest, and space simulation," adding that its technical execution "matches and often exceeds the famous Western games like Quake, Duke Nukem 3D, and Privateer II."

Reviewers described the gameplay as deep and varied. Parkan was seen as a fusion of space simulation and 3D action that offered more player freedom than comparable Western titles. Critics also highlighted its strategy elements and quest-driven storyline. At the same time, they noted that mastering the game's complex mechanics required significant time.

The game's visuals received mixed reviews. The three-dimensional spacecraft models were praised for their detail and originality. In contrast, critics considered the use of two-dimensional sprites for robots in first-person sequences outdated. A reviewer from Strana Igr noted that graphics became the main source of player criticism, and while some overlooked these issues, "compared to recent Western productions, Parkan looked rather modest."

Technical aspects also drew criticism. Reviewers pointed to the high system requirements and the lack of joystick support at launch, a significant drawback for a space simulation. The Parkan 3DX patch addressed these problems by adding 3D accelerator and joystick compatibility, which greatly improved performance. Domashiy Kompyuter highlighted the game’s advanced technical approach, with optimization for multiple processor architectures and support for MMX and Pentium Pro technology.

Parkan was regarded as a difficult game. Critics noted that even experienced players needed time to learn its mechanics. A reviewer from Domashiy Kompyuter described it as complex and varied but still engaging, adding that a universal walkthrough was impossible because of the procedurally generated world and the random nature of events. A later version eased the early gameplay by making the jumper, a key item for interstellar travel, more accessible to new players.

International reception was more restrained than the game’s domestic success. The Bulgarian magazine Master Games praised the project's ambition and core concept, calling it "simply brilliant," but criticized its technical execution. The reviewer pointed to dated visuals in the space simulator and a basic 3D engine for interiors with very low polygon counts and a distinctive color scheme. The Czech portal Bonusweb published a negative review. Reviewer Ondřej Zach acknowledged the game’s ambitious scope and attempt at "absolute freedom and multiple genres," but criticized its execution. He compared the graphics in the 3D action mode to Doom, called the gameplay repetitive — "identical ships, identical graphics, identical missions... everything identical" — and judged the space simulation as the most engaging element, praising its dynamic music and flexible energy distribution system. The German magazine PC Joker was even more critical, giving the game a very low score of 22 percent.
