= Boiling Point: Road to Hell =

2005 video game

- Developer: Deep Shadows
- Publishers: RU: Russobit-M; NA/PAL: Atari
- Engine: Vital Engine 2
- Platform: Microsoft Windows
- Release: GER: 19 May 2005; RU/UK: 20 May 2005; NA: 6 June 2005
- Genres: First-person shooter, role-playing
- Mode: Single-player

Boiling Point: Road to Hell (Xenus: Точка кипения, Xenus: Boiling Point) is a first-person shooter video game developed by Ukrainian studio Deep Shadows. It was released for Windows in the UK on 20 May 2005 and in North America on 6 June 2005. The gameplay is a combination of first-person shooter and role-playing mechanics set in an open world.

Boiling Point: Road to Hell received mixed reviews from critics. This was attributed to the many technical issues that plagued the game's release: bugs, glitches and choppy performance. Patches have been released that address many but not all of these deficiencies. Deep Shadows released a successor in 2009 called White Gold: War in Paradise, and another game with the same engine called The Precursors. Boiling Point was re-released on Steam and GOG on 14 November 2023.

== Premise ==
Boiling Point's protagonist is Saul Myers (whose character model is based on actor Arnold Vosloo), a veteran of the French Foreign Legion living abroad in Paris. Myers' daughter, Lisa, is a globetrotting journalist. Lisa runs afoul of and is kidnapped by persons unknown while working in the fictional, troubled South American nation of Realia (the CIS version has not been changed. The country is called Colombia). News of this is quickly relayed to Myers, who hastily departs for Realia, where he must tangle with local politics and the criminal underworld while trying to track down his missing daughter.

== Gameplay ==
The game is set in a Realian valley, an undivided 25x25km (625 km^{2}) map. There are no in-game loading screens or level transitions. The geography of the valley itself is tropical jungle. There are two primary cities: Puerto Sombra in the west, which is in the hands of the local government, and Pueblo Faro in the east, which is held by communist insurgents (see: Factions). Scattered throughout the rest of the valley are various bases, plantations, villages, and estates. Due to the large size of the game world there are several modes of transportation available: cars, trucks, tanks, planes, helicopters, and boats.

Gameplay is a hybrid of FPS and RPG mechanics. Character advancement is skill-based, with specific skills either being enhanced through practice, or atrophied via disuse. The list of skills is limited, and is constructed of weapon proficiencies and physical ability. However, killing everything in sight is not the goal of the game. Saul Myers' goal is to find his daughter, so he will need to talk to many people to gather the necessary information to unravel the mystery of her disappearance. Much of this information can only be purchased with the Realian currency, and the primary means of generating income is by completing missions for the game's various factions.

There are no predefined enemies in the game except for hostile animals such as snakes and jaguars in the wilderness. There are many NPCs, with almost all of them being neutral at the start. There are six factions in the game: the Realian government, the communist guerrillas, the mafia, local Indian tribes, unaffiliated bandits, and an American CIA presence. Civilians are also considered a faction for the purposes of calculating Myers' "reputation", which is variable and dynamic. Completing missions for a faction's rivals will lower Myers' reputation with them, and hostile factions will shoot on sight. There are, however, methods of repairing Myer's reputation.

== Reception ==
Due to the buggy nature of the game unpatched, reviewers who rated the game when it first came out were heavily critical of the game, with a reviewer from PC Gamer magazine saying "Unless it receives some extreme patching, don't bother with this game." At the same time, reviewers who either looked past the buggy issues, or were late to review and therefore able to patch the game to the reportedly stable 2.0 version, were largely positive, with a reviewer from gamesTM saying "Atari has landed itself an absolute classic here. A must-have – no questions asked." Edge magazine would bemusedly quote from the patch notes a few months later and observe that the removal of the game's bugs had removed much of the game's limited entertainment value.

== See also ==
- White Gold: War in Paradise
- Precursors
