= Nikita Online =

Russian video game publisher and developer

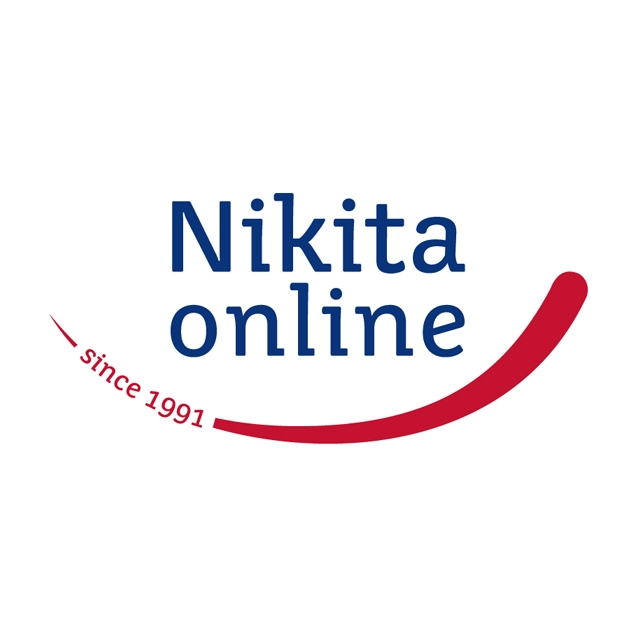
- After 20th anniversary rebranding
- Type: Proprietary organization
- Industry: Computer games publishing and development
- Founded: 14 October 1991; 34 years ago
- Key people: Nikita Skripkin, Stepan Zotov
- Number of employees: ~100

Nikita Online is a Russian publisher and developer of online games. Founded in 1991 and originally named NIKITA, it became the first Russian game company.

Currently Nikita Online operates with 19 titles in Russia, CIS and Baltic States. Those are online client games 4Story, Asda Story 2, Divine Souls, Dragon Knight, Avatarika, Karos Online, King of Kings 3, Rappelz, World of Dragons, Sphere, Sphere: Reborn, Dragona Online as well as browser-based I, the Feudal Lord, Lost Magic, FUBAR, The Panic Room: Outrage, The Kingdom, Ceiron Wars and Reborn Horizon. All the projects are integrated to the GameXP entertainment web-portal. The company's user base exceeds more than 11 million.

Nikita Online's offices are located in Moscow and Rostov-on-Don.

== History ==
- 14 October 1991 — The day of the company's foundation
- 1992–1997 — Games for children by NIKITA were installed in more than 3000 schools and kindergartens in Scandinavia.
- 1995–1997 — The company's management made it into TOP-100 of the most professional managers of Russia's IT-business according to the TOP Profi rating.
- 1995 — The Birthday game became the winner of Moscow International Festival of Computer Graphics and Animation "Anigraph".
- 1996 — Twigger was released. It became the first Russian game which received 100% rating twice in specialized gaming magazines Games Magazine and Pro Games.
- 1997 — Parkan was released.
- 1997 — The Magic Dream won the Best Graphics award at the festival "Anigraph".
- 1999 — NIKITA developed a number of mini-games for browsers; games were used on the Russian websites and soon entered the German market as well.
- 2000 — NIKITA became the Best Developer of Entertainment Software in Russia according to the Computer Elite rating.
- 2001 — The company's president Nikita Skripkin was named the Man of the Year in the "Games" category of the Rambler webportal.
- 2003 — In cooperation with 1C Company, NIKITA produced the first Russian client MMORPG Sphere.
- 2004 — At the decision of the public expert council of the Moscow Consumer Protection Fund NIKITA received the diploma "For active participation in forming a civilized consumer market in Russia."
- 2005 — Sphere won the Best Multiplayer Game of 2004 award following the Gameland Awards ceremony. Following the results of GDC 2005 Parkan II was named the Best PC Game, and the mobile version of Sphere became the Best Game for Handheld Platforms.
- 2006 — NIKITA launched three titles — the browser game WebRacing, the first Russian online real-life simulator DOM 3 (in cooperation with television network TNT) and the economic strategy Hauler: The Transport Company.
- 2006 — Sphere: The World of the Chosen became the Best Multiplayer Game of 2005 following the results of Gameland Awards 2006.
- 2006 — NIKITA was awarded the Industry Prize for outstanding achievements in professional activities following the results of professional competition at GDC Awards 2006.
- 2007 — NIKITA has changed its name to NIKITA ONLINE to emphasize its focus on online games.
- 2007 — Sphere: Reborn, an updated version of the first Russian client MMORPG was released. The game used a micro-transactions model.
- 2007 — The same year two fantasy novels based on the Sphere universe were published.
- 2007 — DOM 3 was awarded at World Summit Award Global Contest in the "Internet Entertainment" category.
- 2008 — A localized version of Rappelz, a large-scale Korean online game was released.
- 2008 — Sphere 2 Arena was released.
- 2008 — The company passed the milestone of 1 million unique users.
- 2009 — The Russian version of 4Story Online was released.
- 2010 — Dragon Knight Online, Asda Story and Karos Online were launched.
- 2010 — The Russian version of Rappelz got the second place worldwide in terms of revenue, ceding only to the US.
- 2010 — The company passed the milestone of 5 million unique users.
- 2011 — Divine Souls, King of Kings 3, I, the Feudal Lord and Lost Magic were launched.
- 2011 — Russian Karos Online became the global leader among other versions of Karos in terms of revenue and CCU.
- 2011 — The company passed the milestone of 7 million unique users.
- 2012 — The company started its first social games endeavor and launched The Panic Room: Otrage hidden object title via Russian social networking sites VK.com (VK (social network)), Odnoklassniki (Odnoklassniki), My World@Mail.RU (My.mail.ru) as well as Polish Nasza Klasa (Nasza-klasa.pl) and Latvian Draugiem (Draugiem.lv).The company passed the milestone of nine million unique users and launched its own-developed entertainment web-portal GameXP.
- 2013 — The renewed GameXP entertainment portal won the GameXP Is Awarded by Gameland Magazine "The most trendy online games website" award by the Russian Gameland magazine. The number of users of the company's projects reached 10 million.

== Games ==
- Sphere (MMORPG)
- Sphere: Reborn (MMORPG)
- Rappelz (MMORPG)
- 4Story Online (MMORPG)
- Dragon Knight Online (MMORPG)
- Asda Story 2 (MMORPG)
- Karos Online (MMORPG)
- Divine Souls (MMORPG)
- King of Kings 3 (MMORPG)
- I, the Feudal Lord (Browser-based MMORTS)
- Lost Magic (Browser-based MMORPG)
- The Panic Room: Outrage (Social and mobile game)
- Dragona Online (MMORPG)
- Ceiron Wars (Browser-based RPG)
- Reborn Horizon (Browser-based MMORTS)
- Avatarika (Social MMO)
- World of Dragons (MMORPG)
- FUBAR (MMO)
- Safari Biathlon (Сафари Биатлон) (Racing Arcade)
- Magic Turn (Полный улёт)
- The Sixth Dimension (Шестое измерение)
- Parkan: The Imperial Chronicles (Паркан: Хроника Империи)
- Parkan: Iron Strategy (Паркан: Железная Стратегия)
- Parkan II (Паркан II)

== Executive Board ==
Nikita Skripkin — President
Stepan Zotov — CEO
Maria Koltsova — Head of Legal, HR and Procurement
Olesya Koroleva — Chief Business Development Officer
Eugene Lamekhov — Chief Marketing Officer
Maksim Polyakov — Chief Technical Officer
Oleg Kostin - Creative Director
