= The Stalin Subway =

2005 video game

- Developer: G5 Software
- Publisher: Buka Entertainment
- Designer: Nikolay Sitnikov
- Series: The Stalin Subway
- Engine: Orion Engine
- Platform: Microsoft Windows
- Release: RUS: September 29, 2005
- Genre: First-person shooter

The Stalin Subway (Russian title Метро-2, "Metro-2") is a first-person shooter video game developed by G5 Software and Orion Games. It was published by Buka Entertainment in Russia in September 2005 and in the United States in October of that year.

== Gameplay ==
The game features standard first-person shooter gameplay. Players can acquire a variety of both melee weapons and firearms, mostly based on Soviet weapons such as a Makarov pistol or PPSh-41 sub-machine gun.

== Plot ==
Like You Are Empty (2006) and the games in the Metro 2033 series, the game is set in and around the Moscow Metro system. It takes place in 1952 in Moscow in the Soviet Union, under Joseph Stalin who has been in power for over 30 years. The game focuses on a fictional internal plot against Stalin and the Soviet government. Locations include the Metro subway stations including the secret Metro-2 line, the KGB Lubyanka Building, the Kremlin, the Moscow State University, and Stalin's bunker.

The protagonists are the MGB officer Gleb Suvorov and the GRU officer Natalia Mihaleva. Suvorov discovers that a conspiracy of high-ranking officers want to detonate a secret nuclear weapon sent via D-6 during the Party assembly. He rescues his father from the KGB prison and thwarts the plot.

== Development ==
The art and design team used photos of Moscow for realism. Before E3 2005 GameSpot noted that its "combination [of] historical fiction plotline and modern FPS gameplay sets it apart from the typical sci-fi or military shooters that dominate the market today" and showed interest in way the physics engine allowed "different bullet penetration abilities for each weapon.

== Reception ==
Released on Steam, the game received generally mixed to negative reviews from critics outside of Russia.

== Sequel ==
A sequel The Stalin Subway: Red Veil (also known as The Stalin Subway 2, Russian title: Метро-2: Смерть вождя) in which players take on the role of the protagonist's wife Lena following his disappearance was released in 2008. Eurogamer Germany gave it a rating of 1 out of 10.
