= Nerves of Steel (video game) =

1995 video game

- Developers: Rainmaker Software; BnB Software
- Publisher: Merit Studios
- Platform: MS-DOS
- Release: 1995
- Genre: First-person shooter

Nerves of Steel is a first-person shooter video game developed by Rainmaker Software and BnB Software that was published by Merit Studios in 1995 for MS-DOS computers. A port for the Atari Jaguar was slated for a Q2 1995 release, which never came to fruition.

== Plot ==
Nerves of Steel is set in the near future in Southeast Asia where ruler Kim Dung Moon is set on purifying the world. Moon plans to carry out this plan through a system of elaborate tunnels called the "Iron Triangle". The player must infiltrate this tunnel system and defeat all soldiers and monsters in their path to stop Kim Dung Moon's evil plans.

== Gameplay ==
The game is in a first-person perspective where the player uses rifles, pistols, and a rocket launcher to defeat monsters and soldiers in a tunnel complex. This game has a very similar control setup to Doom. The game has a solo campaign as well as multi-player playing options.

== Reception ==
Nerves of Steel is generally viewed as one of the worst first-person shooter video games of all time. Awkward controls and distasteful graphics are the two main complaints given by most reviewers.

== See also ==
- The Fortress of Dr. Radiaki
- Isle of the Dead
