= Cmune =

Chinese video game developer

- Company type: Private
- Available in: English
- Founded: March 2007
- Dissolved: 2020
- Headquarters: Beijing, China
- Creators: Ludovic Bodin, Shaun Lelacheur Sales
- Key people: Ludovic Bodin; Shaun Lelacheur Sales; Benjamin Joffe; Yong Joon Hyoung; Tommy Franken; Gabriel Weyer; Jerome Scola; Eamon Logue
- Industry: Online games, Internet, Social Networking
- Products: Computer games
- Employees: 18 employees
- Website: cmune.webflow.io

Cmune is a Chinese software developer which was established in 2007. Cmune is the maker of UberStrike, a cross-platform computer game. Cmune has offices in Beijing, China and San Francisco, United States.

Developed initially under the name Paradise Paintball, the first-person shooter (FPS) Uberstrike is a casual and multiplayer free-to-play 3D browser game. As of November 2012, it was the largest FPS inside Facebook. It was also available on its own website, and on the App Store for Mac and iOS. As of June 13, 2016, the game has been offline. The company was shut down later in 2020. Throughout its lifespan, the company has received funding from Atomico, DCM and Starbreeze. According to one of the moderators, on DeadHeads discord server, the company was moving its HQ from Hong Kong to Taiwan in 2017, but there is no information available as to whether they succeeded or not.

== Recognition ==
On 28 May 2009, Paradise Paintball was selected as one of the winners of the Facebook fbFund 2009 program. The fbFund is run by Facebook, Accel Partners, and The Founders Fund. Cmune was nominated for two Unity Awards: the Community Choice Award, which is chosen by users via poll, and The Cross Platform Award.

== Games ==
Cmune has developed three games in total: UberStrike, DeadHeads, and UltraHunt. The company also worked on PAYDAY: Crime War for a few months.

UberStrike was an online FPS for PC's and later became available on iOS. The game's servers were shut down in 2016 but the original website www.uberstrike.com remains.

DeadHeads was an online FPS for Android and iOS. The game was shut down around 2020. Website is still up to this day at deadheads.webflow.io

UltraHunt was a battle royale game for Android and iOS. It originated in 2018 and was in closed pre-alpha stage. Not so much is known about that game.

== UberStrike ==
Paradise Paintball was later renamed to UberStrike.

Paradise Paintball was launched in November 2008. The game was ranked number 1 worldwide on Apple Dashboard for four months after its debut in November 2008 and was the first real-time 3D multiplayer game launched on Facebook and MySpace, where it was awarded "Best New App" at GDC in March 2010. Paradise Paintball was touted as the first 3D browser-based game with real-time micropayment systems, where users are able to purchase virtual goods without having to quit the game.

Paradise Paintball was renamed UberStrike on November 16, 2010. The game also had a forum where every player could seek training, visit clan threads, sell signature art, etc. On April 13, 2016, Cmune announced the closing of Uberstrike through the game's website homepage, and the game servers were terminated on June 13, 2016.

== DeadHeads ==
DeadHeads was launched back in May 2017. It offered 12 weapons and lots of skins to them, 4 survivor characters (with each having own skins) and 5 infected characters (with each having own skins). There were 10 maps in total, with some being taken from UberStrike: Turbine, Transit, Outpost, New Hongkong, Lunar, Hangar, Ground Zero, Garrison, Basilica and Aqualab. This game had a discord server which is still up to this day and can be accessed from the official website. The game was shut down in 2020 with studio as well.

== UltraHunt ==
UltraHunt was launched in 2018 as closed pre-alpha. It was supposed to be a battle royale for Android and iOS devices. The website is still available via ultrahunt.webflow.io. Very little is known about it as of 2022.

== PAYDAY: Crime War ==
Cmune used to work on the mobile port of PAYDAY 2 called PAYDAY: Crime War. The company has worked on the game for some time, according to Pocket Gamer Starbreeze invested $1.4M into Cmune to develop the game.

== See also ==
- Online gaming in China

== Notes ==
- https://www.destructoid.com/paintball-3d-becomes-the-first-facebook-fps--170927.phtml
- http://www.polygon.com/2013/2/19/4006744/uberstrike-developers-planning-for-tablet-release
