= Rebel Moon Rising =

1997 video game

- Developer: Fenris Wolf
- Publisher: GT Interactive
- Producer: Theodore Beale
- Engine: Proprietary software
- Platform: Windows
- Release: 1997
- Genre: First-person shooter
- Modes: Single-player, multiplayer

Rebel Moon Rising is a first-person shooter computer game released in 1997 for Windows. It was produced by Theodore Beale (also known as Vox Day), made by Beale's Fenris Wolf studio, and published by GT Interactive. A PlayStation version was also announced, but GT Interactive decided to put the PlayStation version on hold until sales figures for the PC version came in, and later cancelled this version. In the game, the Moon has been colonized, and due to political conflicts, the Lunar colonies are rebelling against the United Nations. The player is on the side of the Lunar alliance, fighting against United Nation forces. The game later takes a twist, when an alien species is discovered.

This game is the sequel to Rebel Moon. With the same basis as Rising, the player takes on 27 levels in the original Rebel Moon, quite a few more levels than Rising. Rebel Moon was only released in a bonus disk with the Creative Labs hardware "3D BLASTER PCI". The series was also planned to have a third game, titled Rebel Moon Revolution, but it was cancelled by GT Interactive. Due to insufficient communications about the cancellation, Fenris Wolf instated a lawsuit against GT Interactive.

The PC shareware version of Rebel Moon Rising is included on disc 2 of the EIDOS Interactive game Blood, copyright 1997.

A novelization of Rebel Moon, written by Beale and Bruce Bethke was published in 1996.

== Reception ==
Loyd Price, reviewing the game for Computer Gaming World in September 1997, gave it three out of five stars. Price praised the game's mission design and multiplayer, but described the sprite-based graphics as "a little dated" and said the game's oxygen management system and arbitrary puzzle designs "add a jarring and frustrating element to an otherwise solid game".

The game was commercially unsuccessful. Beale claimed the release of Quake at about the same time made gaming consumers look for 3D games, rather than the "2.5D" of Rebel Moon Rising.
