= Scorpion: Disfigured =

2009 video game

- Developer: B-Cool Interactive
- Publisher: Mamba Games
- Platform: Microsoft Windows
- Release: 23 October 2009
- Genre: First-person shooter
- Mode: Single Player

Scorpion: Disfigured is a 2009 first-person shooter with a futuristic setting. It was developed by B-Cool Interactive and released for Microsoft Windows.

== Setting ==
Scorpion: Disfigured has a unique setting, which take place in a futuristic world that is on the brink of reverting to a time similar to the Middle Ages.

== Gameplay ==
The game features eight weapons, including traditional and futuristic rifles. The player has access to two different types of grenades, for use against gun turrets and enemies. There are five varied special abilities, which include night vision, slow-motion and an energy shield. The game features role-playing elements, containing a limited number of upgrades for each special ability. There are a total of twenty levels and twenty-three types of enemies.

== Reception ==
Reception

Aggregate score
Aggregator	Score
Metacritic	44/100

Review score
Publication	Score
GameStar	49/100

Scorpion: Disfigured received negative reviews from critics upon release. On Metacritic, the game holds a score of 44/100 based on 5 reviews, indicating "generally unfavorable reviews".
