= Fortune's Run =

Cancelled video game

- Developer: Team Fortune
- Publisher: Team Fortune
- Designers: Dizzie and Arachne
- Platform: Windows
- Release: Cancelled
- Genres: First-person shooter, immersive sim
- Mode: Single-player

Fortune's Run is a cancelled first-person action shooter video game. It was being developed by Team Fortune, an indie developer team comprised by Dizzie and Arachne. The game is designed after 1990s sci-fi aesthetics and cites Deus Ex as a reference.

An early access release was published on Steam in September 2023, which was described by PC Gamer as "one of the best shooters you can play right now". According to Team Fortune, the game was "rejected" by Steam that September due to a "disgusting" scene they had included, and also because the company disagreed with a sexual assault content warning by the developers. They stated that they intended to apply to have the game included on the platform again.

After Dizzie was sentenced to three years in prison for a violent offense, the game's development was put on hold in early 2025. Dizzie was released on parole in the following year and resumed working on the game.

On August 24, 2026, Dizzie discontinued development of the game.

== Reception ==
In a 2022 preview, PC Gamer compared the game to Star Wars: Jedi Knight series and said: "I crave more of this world, the game's fantastic imm-sim-lite exploration, and its arresting sword fighting combat." In 2023, PC Gamer wrote: "The mission-based structure it's started with strikes me as a rare great fit for an early access drip feed of new stuff—episodic, like what IO Interactive initially attempted with its Hitman reboot series, and I can't wait to see everything else this ambitious game has to offer." Multiplayer.it played the demo version and said that while the gameplay mechanics are not entirely original, they are varied enough to make the gameplay feel fresher than other games in the genre.
