= Shivam Sai Gupta =

Indian game developer (born 1995)

Shivam Gupta
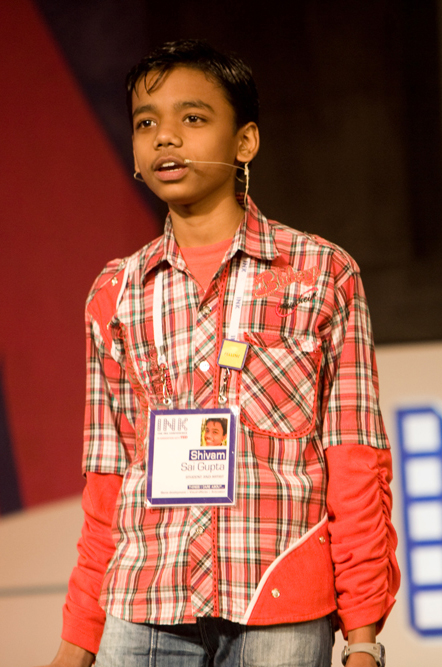
- Shivam Sai Gupta was a INK 2010 fellow.
- Born: December 22, 1995 (age 30); India
- Occupations: Product management, virtual reality developer
- Known for: Game development
- Website: http://shivamsaigupta.com

Shivam Sai Gupta (born December 22, 1995) is a virtual reality evangelist, game developer and public speaker. He is a fellow of The INK Conference, in association with TED, and has spoken at several events including the NASSCOM Gaming And Animation Conclave. In 2014, Priyanka Chopra awarded him the Unbreakable Spirit Award by Viacom 18 Motion Pictures, Bhansali Productions and USHA International. Gupta became interested in computers after finding a PowerPoint presentation when he was 11 years old and shortly thereafter became interested in video games.

In 2010 Gupta published his first game, Terror Attack: Project Fateh, which is based on the 2008 Mumbai attacks. He decide to make the game as a way "to motivate people to stand up against terrorism and create awareness. The game was released for free through Indiagames and received praise for its graphics. Gupta created Food Run, an Android game, aimed at subconsciously altering children's eating behavior to make them healthier. The game quickly climbed the Google Play Store charts to #9 in Top New Free Games in India.

Gupta moved out of the video gaming industry and got into virtual reality and augmented reality technology. He founded a virtual reality focused online media publication VirtualRealityPit after serving as a VR Producer at Happy Finish India. Gupta continued his engagement with VirtualRealityPit as the editor-in-chief. In 2016, he started a VR/AR department at software services company Vara United Pvt Ltd. He currently serves as the Evangelist & Head of the AR/VR division of the company. Gupta is frequently invited to give talks on AR/VR at various corporate conference and educational institutions like Don Bosco Institute of Technology and National Institute of Design.

== Games ==
- Terror Attack: Project Fateh (2010)
- The Mystery of Stonewood Manor
- Smart Ball 3D
- Food Run
