= The Fortress of Dr. Radiaki =

1994 video game

- Developers: Future Visionary, Inc. Maelstrom Software
- Publisher: Merit Studios (Note: Distributed in Australia by Directsoft)
- Platform: DOS
- Release: NA: October 1994; AU: 1994
- Genre: First-person shooter
- Mode: Single-player

The Fortress of Dr. Radiaki is a first-person shooter developed by Maelstrom Software and Future Visionary. It was released in 1994 for DOS by Merit Studios. The game uses a 2.5D graphic engine, similar to the one used in Wolfenstein 3D. The game was exclusively re-released, alongside Command Adventures: Starship and Harvester, by Lee Jacobson on ZOOM-Platform.com for Linux, macOS and Windows on January 27, 2023.

== Gameplay ==
The plot of the game is that a mad scientist named Dr. Radiaki is going to destroy the world if an amount of $1 billion is not deposited in his account. The player controls a special agent named Mack Banner, whose mission is to kill Dr. Radiaki. The objective of the game is to find the exit of each level in order to progress to the next, each level being infested with enemies that attack the player including guards, mutant monsters and robots, etc. To defend yourself, the game offers an arsenal of seven different weapons. The player can find the weapons and ammunition in various spots throughout the levels. Some doors require a specific key in order to be opened. The keys also are found throughout the levels. The game also features boss battles in some levels.

== Reception ==
Reception

Review scores
Publication	Score
Computer Gaming World	2/5
Next Generation	3/5

Next Generation reviewed the game, rating it three stars out of five, and stated that "the game's incredible graphics and tongue-in-cheek cult-film atmosphere are sure to appeal to fans of other first-person shooters."

Later assessments are far more negative. Reviewing the 2023 re-release, GamesRadar+'s Dustin Bailey described it as "[o]ne of the worst Doom clones" and noted "Dr. Radiaki is notable precisely for how not notable it is."

== See also ==
- Isle of the Dead
- Nerves of Steel
