= U.S. Special Forces: Team Factor =

2002 video game

- Developer(s): 7FX
- Publisher(s): Xicat Interactive
- Engine: LightForce
- Platform(s): Windows
- Release: May 11, 2002
- Genre(s): First-person shooter
- Mode(s): Single-player, multiplayer

U.S. Special Forces: Team Factor (also known as Team Factor) is a first-person shooter developed by 7FX in 2002. The game was intended to be a competitor to Counter-Strike, which served as the main inspiration for the game. Unlike Counter Strike, Team Factor features a single-player and a third side.

== Development ==
The game had been in development since 2000. The team consisted of 9 to 14 developers. The development was financed by software company I.C.C.C. to which 7FX belonged. 7FX used its own engine LightForce. The original release date was mid-2001 but in the end it was released in May 2002. The game was published by Xicat Interactive as U.S. Special Forces: Team Factor, instead of the original name, Team Factor.

== Gameplay ==
The game has similar gameplay to Counter-Strike. It features 22 maps with different tasks for each side. There are three sides to play - US Special Forces, Russian Spetznaz and Terrorists. The single-player mode is the same but units are controlled by Bots.

== Reception ==
The game has received generally unfavorable reviews. It currently holds a 44% on Metacritic and 46.5% on GameRankings. It was criticised for its gameplay, graphics and AI behavior.
