= White Gold: War in Paradise =

2008 video game

- Developer: Deep Shadows
- Publisher: CIS: Russobit-M
- Engine: Vital Engine 3
- Platform: Microsoft Windows
- Release: 24 October 2008 (Russia); 21 December 2010 (GamersGate); 23 November 2016 (Steam)
- Genres: First-person shooter, role playing
- Mode: Single player

White Gold: War in Paradise (Xenus II: Белое золото, Xenus II: White Gold) is a 2008 first-person shooter role-playing video game and the sequel or possibly prequel to 2005's Boiling Point: Road to Hell. White Gold was developed by Ukrainian game studio Deep Shadows. The Microsoft Windows version was released in CIS territories by Russobit-M on October 24, 2008. The game runs on the Vital Engine 3, which also powers The Precursors.

== Gameplay ==
The game features a free-roaming world, with vast open areas, diverse weapons and a multitude of land, air and water vehicles. Hand-to-hand combat was also implemented. The character development system has been extensively altered and improved upon to provide more flexibility than previous versions. One of the major overhauls being the new perk system.

== Setting ==
The game's events take place in water-separated islands in the Caribbean, in contrast to the single land mass called Realia from Boiling Point. The hero arrives on the islands to investigate a series of mysterious events connected to poisonous cocaine. He finds himself in the middle of a socially unstable and politically volatile environment, with 7 different factions including Civilians, Government, Mafia, Guerrillas, Bandits, Natives and CIA operatives.

== Plot ==
The main character is John Xenus II, a retired veteran of a special military squad that fought in the Caribbean region. During one fateful mission, many of the main character's squad members were killed, leaving only him and one friend alive. While the friend gradually lost his mind, the main character succumbed to drinking heavily.

Some time later, a new drug surfaces in Europe and America. It is indistinguishable from cocaine, but it has an incredibly high mortality rate. The Government is shocked regarding how many young people are now dying, or are in danger. The drug-mafias are under heavy fire from dead relatives of drug users, who blame them for the drugs release. The Special Services sends men out, only to receive them back in body bags.

The government then remembers the main character, and recruits his help because his old squad friend is involved too. Consequently, the main character finds himself on one of the Caribbean islands, where he starts his investigation.

After much investigation, Saul learns the poisoned cocaine is being produced by an indigenous cult known as The Resurrection of the Gods, who believe the war with the conquistadors was lost because the Christian God put the native gods to sleep, and that those gods must be reawakened to retake the world from the white man. Saul also learns that a faction of the CIA is secretly distributing the poisoned cocaine in the West, in order to create a crisis to increase their budget as well as cull undesirable elements from society. After being captured by the corrupt CIA members, Saul breaks loose and kills all of them. He then travels to the cult's headquarters in an ancient native island city, where he confronts and kills the cult's leader, afterwards reflecting on the cycle of revenge that dominates the region and humanity in general.

== History ==
In December 2010, an English version was made available via digital distribution on GamersGate. The game was also made available for purchase via online retailer Beamdog. On November 23, 2016 a Steam re-release followed.

After the end of official support by Deep Shadows, remaining bugs and issues were fixed by the game community via unofficial patches which also form the base of and are included in the current English digital distribution versions of the game.

== See also ==
- Boiling Point: Road to Hell
- The Precursors
