= The Precursors =

2009 video game

- Developer: Deep Shadows
- Publisher: Russobit-M
- Engine: Vital Engine 3
- Platform: Windows
- Release: CIS: 4 December 2009; GamersGate: 21 December 2010; Steam: 4 February 2017
- Genres: Space simulator, first-person shooter, role-playing
- Mode: Single-player

The Precursors is a 2009 first-person shooter video game developed by Ukrainian studio Deep Shadows. It was released for Windows in Russia on 4 December 2009. It was then released worldwide through GamersGate on 21 December 2010 and through Steam on 4 February 2017.

The Precursors is set in a futuristic sci-fi environment where many political factions are engaged in an intergalactic war. The player is able to explore a multitude of planets, travel through outer space to complete missions, obtain information, and buy weapons and supplies in an open world free-roaming environment. The game received mixed reviews from critics.

== Gameplay ==
The game features a free-roaming world, with vast open areas, diverse weapons and a multitude of land, air and space vehicles. The player will be able to do a multitude of missions on six different planets or moons and even the interior of spaceships and space stations. Different vehicles can be used in engagements on the ground ranging from simple buggies and flyers to hover tanks and mechanical robots. After getting a spaceship, the player can also engage in space trade and combat with other factions in between the planetary missions. The player's spaceship can be upgraded throughout the game and the player character himself can be developed using a perk system.

=== Factions ===
There are seven main factions in the game. Two being aliens and the rest representing various humanoid factions which are split into separate alliances that are usually fighting each other. These factions are the Empire, the Democratic Union, the Free Traders, the Clatz of the Nest, the revolutionary Clatz, the bandits and the civilians.

== Development ==
The Precursors was in development for PC and Xbox 360 from Kyiv-based developer Deep Shadows; the Xbox 360 version was later cancelled. The game was built based on Deep Shadows in-house game engine Vital Engine 3 which also powers White Gold: War in Paradise. The game was first demonstrated in August 2005 at the Games Convention in Leipzig, Germany and at the E3 in Los Angeles in May 2006.

The Precursors was released on the 4 December 2009 as retail for the PC in Russia. In May 2010, a spokesperson from Deep Shadows confirmed that the console version of the game has been put "on hold" indefinitely. In December 2010, an English version was made available via digital distribution by GamersGate and online retailer Beamdog. On February 4, 2017, a Steam re-release followed.

After the end of official support by Deep Shadows, remaining bugs and issues, like the missing voice overs in the localized English version, were fixed by the game community via unofficial patches which also form the base of and are included in the current English digital distribution versions of the game.

== Reception ==
The Precursors received "mixed or average" reviews from critics. It has an average score of 68/100 according to review aggregator website Metacritic.

== See also ==
- Parkan (series)
- White Gold: War in Paradise
