= Special Force (2003 video game) =

Hezbollah-produced first-person shooter

- Developer: Hadeel
- Publisher: Hezbollah Central Internet Bureau
- Engine: Genesis3D
- Platform: Windows
- Release: 16 February 2003
- Genre: First-person shooter
- Mode: Single-player

Special Force (Arabic: القوة الخاصة, romanized: Al-Quwwa al-Khāṣṣa) is a 2003 first-person shooter produced by the Central Internet Bureau of Hezbollah, a Lebanese Islamist militant group. The game recreates battles from the South Lebanon conflict between Hezbollah and Israel, with the player assuming the role of a Hezbollah fighter tasked with defeating Israeli soldiers. Hezbollah conceived the game immediately after the conflict ended in 2000 and developed it with the company Hadeel over more than two years.

Special Force was released in February 2003 in several Arab countries and sold 18,000 copies by September. Regarded as propaganda and a recruitment tool, the game was condemned by Jewish organisations and Israeli officials. It was cited as a role reversal of games like America's Army and noted for its outdated technology. Special Force 2: Tale of the Truthful Pledge, a sequel based on the 2006 Lebanon War between the same sides, was released in August 2007 to limited success.

== Gameplay ==
The game's training mission has the player shoot posters of Israeli officials like Shaul Mofaz.

Special Force is a first-person shooter set during the South Lebanon conflict fought between Israel and Hezbollah. The latter is a Lebanese Islamist militant group classified by some countries as a terrorist organisation. The game recreates several Hezbollah operations that occurred during the conflict, including their geographic locations, weather conditions, land mine arrangements, and numbers of combatants. The player takes the role of a Hezbollah fighter. At the start of each mission, the narrative is furthered through a text briefing. There are three missions, consisting mostly of street clashes. In combat, the player uses a knife, a pistol, Kalashnikov rifles, and hand grenades against Israeli soldiers and their Merkava tanks and Boeing AH-64 Apache helicopters.

In the training mode, the player practices shooting at posters of prominent Israeli political and military figures (including the prime minister Ariel Sharon, defence minister Shaul Mofaz, and former prime minister Ehud Barak) to obtain points. Upon completing the game, the player is virtually awarded a medal and a certificate from the Hezbollah leader Hassan Nasrallah, as well as shown some Hezbollah fighters, described as martyrs, who were killed during the conflict. The game is playable in Arabic, English, French, and Farsi.

== Development and release ==
Special Force was produced by Hezbollah's Central Internet Bureau. It was conceived immediately after the South Lebanon conflict ended in 2000, and the idea was greenlit by top Hezbollah officials. While the group had years of experience releasing software and maintaining websites, including media about the conflict, this project was its first video game. The game was developed by the Lebanese company Hadeel using Genesis3D, a free game engine. According to the Central Internet Bureau official Mahmoud Rayya, it was designed to counter foreign video games that present Arabs as enemies to be defeated by American heroes. The developers used material from Hezbollah's media archives, including films and maps, to recreate real combat scenarios. After more than two years of development, the game was released on 16 February 2003 in Lebanon, Syria, Iran, Bahrain, and the United Arab Emirates. It was distributed by the company Sunlight and marketed towards the domestic market and the diaspora.

== Reception ==
The first batch of 8,000 copies of Special Force sold out within one week. According to Kassem Ghaddar, the owner of Sunlight, the sales exceeded expectations. Foreign markets included Australia, Canada, Germany, and the United Kingdom. More than 18,000 copies had been sold by September 2003, of which 10,000 in Lebanon and around 1,000 in Europe and Australia. Over 200 were sold in the United Kingdom. By October 2014, the game remained available only by phone order in some Arab countries.

Lebanese children interviewed by several media outlets expressed their affection for the game as it allowed them to kill Israelis, something they could not do in real life. Alexander R. Galloway, an assistant professor at New York University, regarded the game as "among the first truly realist games in existence" for mirroring "the everyday struggles of the downtrodden, leading to a direct criticism of current social policy". He believed the game represented a role reversal of games like America's Army, putting an Arab in the protagonist position rather than an enemy role. According to Galloway, the game featured no strong narrative message in its gameplay apart from occasional pro-intifada and anti-Israeli iconography. However, unlike the similarly themed game Under Ash, he felt the game had no educational tone and resorted solely to violence. From a technical standpoint, the Frankfurter Allgemeine Zeitung noted that the game could not compete with Western releases, lagging behind by roughly two years, and had compatibility issues on newer versions of Windows.

Special Force was condemned by Jewish organisations like the Board of Deputies of British Jews. Ron Prosor, a spokesman for the Israeli Ministry of Foreign Affairs, called it "part of an educational process which is preventing any chance of real peace" between Israel and Lebanon. The Australian politician Michael Danby considered it dehumanising, while Eclipse Entertainment, the developer of Genesis3D, distanced itself from the game. The New York Times characterised Special Force as part of Hezbollah's propaganda efforts in Lebanese media to establish itself as a popular entity. The Sunday Herald said it was a recruitment tool aiming to entice young players to join the group. According to the Frankfurter Allgemeine Zeitung, it could particularly affect youths who regularly experienced such violence and could relate to the player character. Starting in December 2006, the Israeli Center for Digital Art in Holon displayed the game as part of its Forbidden Games exhibition of ideological video games.

== Sequel ==
Following the 2006 Lebanon War fought between Hezbollah and Israel, Hezbollah re-created the conflict in Special Force 2: Tale of the Truthful Pledge. Developers of the original game formed a new studio, Might 3D, which made the game using an unlicensed version of CryEngine. The game features four levels with an expanded arsenal and resource management. Hezbollah released Special Force 2 on 16 August 2007 and featured it in a local exhibit about the conflict. The group expected high demand both domestically and abroad, and the game saw several hundred pre-orders in Lebanon. The game attained "limited fame" in the country. Special Force 2 was officially released only in Arabic, although an unofficial, free English version exists. The author of the English patch noted that it would be haram for someone to download the game without donating US$10 to Hezbollah or a local mosque.
