= Coded Arms =

2005 video game

- North American box art
- Developer: Konami
- Publisher: Konami
- Director: Yasushi Fujisawa
- Designers: Takayuki Makino; Tetsuya Matsui; Jutaro Oue
- Platform: PlayStation Portable
- Release: JP: June 23, 2005; NA: July 6, 2005; EU: September 9, 2005; AU: September 30, 2005
- Genre: First-person shooter
- Modes: Single-player, multiplayer

Coded Arms (コーデッド アームズ, Kōdeddo Āmuzu) is a first-person shooter video game that was developed and published by Konami for the PlayStation Portable handheld in 2005.

== Plot ==
Late in the 21st century, advancements in medical and computer technology allow for linear connectivity of human minds to computer networks, causing an unprecedented boom in computer hackers. The game takes place inside a virtual reality military training simulator named "AIDA" which has since been long-abandoned. However, the program continues to run, generating enemies and levels for the no longer present soldiers-in-training. The player takes the role of one of the many hackers attempting to break the codes of the simulator and extract the most valuable data possible for fame and profit. To do this, the player must explore several "sectors" that are infested with various kinds of enemies, including soldiers, security bots, giant bugs and other insect and plant-like creatures. The only way to survive and reap the greatest rewards is by reaching the Kernel database, destroying the enemies and the bosses at the end of each sector. The game's intro cutscene informs the hacker/player that hacking too deeply into unknown non-civilian protocols with what seem to be homebrew hacking tools carries the risk of contracting a medical condition called the "Achiba Syndrome", and warns them that upon infection that they 'will not be able to return' - presumably meaning their consciousness will become corrupted or otherwise lost and their minds will not be able to return to their bodies in the real world.

== Synopsis ==
After hacking into the training simulator, the player (in the chronological order of the map menu layout) arrives at what seems to be an underground city filled with snipers, drones and some insect-like creatures that are presumably analogues of computer viruses. After completing the City map, the player arrives at the "Base" map (described in-game as an abandoned mine site in an alien planetary colony). There, like the City, the player battles through a 6-floor map in order to get to the Kernel and defeat the level's boss. Upon making their way through the Base, the player will have to travel through the "Ruins" map to complete Sector 1 Training - unlike the past maps, this map contains a majority of insect and flora-like enemies and at points appears to be of Egyptian or Aztec influence. After making their way through the Ruins, the player will hack into a new and more dangerous sector called "Sector 2 Training". Like the previous maps they are also named City, Base and Ruins but possess shifts in visuals throughout progression - for example, Sector 2 City is at first almost identical to Sector 1 City, but about halfway through the art style and decoration immediately shift to a more Japanese aesthetic (Sector 2 City is the only map to have a visible sky) - Sector 2 Base changes from an exposed, industrial warehouse look to a colder military outpost with what appear to be cryogenic pods and computer databases that can be destroyed, and Sector 2 Ruins changes to a darker and much more technologically advanced ruin.

Upon defeating what appears to be the final boss and collecting all upgrades and special weapons, the player is given access the simulator's root Kernel. However, the simulator malfunctions and electrocutes the hacker's body in reality. After the credits end, it is revealed that the hacker survived and became infected with the Achiba Syndrome, trapping their consciousness inside AIDA permanently and forcing them to survive an infinite number of levels in the game's final Sector: "Infinity".

== Gameplay ==
All of the levels in the game are randomly generated when they are accessed. In single player mode, players progress through the game by completing sectors. Sector 00 consists of one battlefield (Training) with 3 levels that serve to familiarize the user with the game. Sector 01 consists of three battlefields (City, Base and Ruins) and each battlefield has 6 levels. Sector 02 also has three battlefields consisting of 13 levels each with a boss at the 13th level of each battlefield. Sector 03 consists of one battlefield (Infinity) which has an unlimited amount of levels to it. The difficulty of the game increases as the user progresses through the sectors. Players can also make use of a 3D map graphically similar to a vector display. Coded Arms also has wifi support for 4-player multiplayer with three game modes including 'Deathmatch', 'Keep the Mark' and 'Last Man Standing'. Weapons and armor are obtained throughout the levels and have one of five different attributes, ranging from "physical" to "fire" as well as specific attributes such as "electric" or "viral". Certain attributes are more effective against certain enemies - for instance, mechanical enemies can be overloaded by weapons with the "electrical" attribute while insect-type enemies usually dwell in the dark so "light"-type weapons do the most damage to them. Enemies also use weapons with different attributes and therefore one can get certain types of armor that are resistant to attacks of a certain type. All of the weapons and grenades can be upgraded by picking up a certain amount of "Opt_Key" files (the amount varies from weapon to weapon). Because the game takes place in a computer program, the equipment and pickups are named with extensions much like in a conventional computer (for example ".arm" for weapons & armaments, ".dfn" for armor and defense items, ".med" for health pickups, etc.).

== Reception ==
Reception

Aggregate score
| Aggregator | Score |
|---|---|
| Metacritic | 59/100 |

Review scores
| Publication | Score |
|---|---|
| Computer Games Magazine | 3/5 |
| Edge | 5/10 |
| Electronic Gaming Monthly | 4.5/10 (Note: Three critics of Electronic Gaming Monthly gave the game each a score of 4/10, 6/10, and 3.5/10.) |
| Famitsu | 30/40 |
| Game Informer | 6.75/10 |
| GameRevolution | D+ |
| GameSpot | 6.6/10 |
| GameSpy | 2.5/5 |
| GameZone | 5/10 |
| Hardcore Gamer | 2.5/5 |
| IGN | 7/10 |
| Official U.S. PlayStation Magazine | 2/5 |
| Pocket Gamer | 2.5/5 |
| X-Play | 3/5 |
| Detroit Free Press | 2/4 |
| Maxim | 3/5 |

The game received "mixed" reviews according to the review aggregation website Metacritic. In Japan, however, Famitsu gave it a score of two eights and two sevens for a total of 30 out of 40. Maxim gave the game a mixed review over a week before its U.S. release date. GamePro gave the game three out of five for fun factor, calling it "A decent fight that has one arm tied behind its back."

== Sequels ==
A sequel, Coded Arms: Contagion, was released for the PlayStation Portable in 2007.

A PlayStation 3 sequel was also planned under the working title Coded Arms: Assault, but was canceled. It was shown at E3 2006.
