= Isle of the Dead (video game) =

1993 video game

- Re-release cover art
- Developer: Rainmaker Software
- Publisher: Merit Software
- Designers: A. Sean Glaspell; W. Scott Simmons
- Programmers: Bruce J. Mack; Bryan Kelsch
- Artist: Myk Friedman
- Composer: Scott Loehr
- Platform: MS-DOS
- Release: 1993
- Genres: First-person shooter, point-and-click adventure
- Mode: Single-player

Isle of the Dead is a point-and-click first-person shooter horror video game developed by Rainmaker Software and published by Merit Software in 1993 for MS-DOS compatible operating systems.. The game centers around Jake Dunbar, the sole survivor of a plane crash, on a mysterious tropical island inhabited by zombies under the control of a mad scientist. Dunbar can interact with non-player characters to acquire weapons and obtain items through adventure game commands.

Originally planned to be a hack-and-slash game, Isle of the Dead was made to have the feel of horror pulp comics. A minicomic was included with the game on release. Reception to the game was negative, both on release and in retrospectives, with criticism given to its graphics, in-game map, and structure. Publications, such as Computer Gaming World, have called it one of the worst video games of all time.

== Gameplay and plot ==
Gameplay of Isle of the Dead, with the main character holding a machete

Isle of the Dead is a first-person shooter and point-and-click adventure game. The plot follows the player character, Jake Dunbar, who is the only survivor of a plane crash on a tropical island filled with zombies that are being controlled by a mad scientist. The goal of the game is to escape the island and save the damsel in distress.

After retrieving items from the wreckage, Dunbar explores the beach and moves further inland by hacking at the undergrowth with a machete. Dunbar can also interact with non-player characters and acquire guns, although ammunition is scarce and limited. Items can be stored and accessed in an inventory screen. The game switches from 3D to 2D when obtaining items, using an adventure game interface as well as commands such as "Look", "Get", and "Use". Instant-death traps also appear in the game; in one of these, a gun blows up in Dunbar's face if it is not lubricated. Quitting the game causes Dunbar to commit suicide by gunshot.

== Development and release ==
Isle of the Dead was developed by Rainmaker Software and published by Dallas, Texas-based company Merit Software. The game's concept and design was created by A. Sean Glaspell; it was programmed by Bruce J. Mack and Bryan Kelsch and featured art by Myk Friedman. While the intention was to create a hack-and-slash game, programmer Bryan Kelsch disliked how the game gave the player tasks without reason. Because of this, the programming teams added a script with narrative hooks, attempting to turn the game into a "good hack and slash game, but with a strong plot". Kelsch said the game was intended to have the feel of horror pulp comics, so a minicomic was included with the game. Isle of the Dead was later shown at the 1993 Consumer Electronics Show. The game was released 1993; a port for the Atari Jaguar CD was in development but never released.

== Reception ==
Reception

Review scores
Publication	Score
Dragon	0/5
Electronic Games	84%
PC Joker	38%
Pelit	13/100

Previewing the game at the Consumer Electronics Show, Computer Gaming World, while not impressed with it graphically, thought that it made up for this with its "enthusiasm, gore, and the spicy addition of a little gratuitous T&A".

Isle of the Dead received negative reviews upon release. Sandy Petersen, writing for Dragon in their "Eye of the Monitor" column, criticized its tedious difficulty and felt fighting the zombies was dull and too difficult. Petersen gave the game zero out of five stars in the magazine's rating scale, advising readers to avoid playing it. Peter Olafson, of Compute!, while negative towards the graphics, compared the mood of Isle of the Dead to EC Comics horror magazines. Chris Lombardi, writing for Computer Gaming World, argued the game was designed to be campy, but otherwise described it as the worst video game he had seen among adventure games and games with 3D graphics. In their 15th anniversary issue, Computer Gaming World rated Isle of the Dead the 32nd worst game of all time, noting its "crude graphics, weak sound, and a weak 3D engine". Multiple publications compared the game to other first-person shooters such as Wolfenstein 3D, while Sandy Petersen considered it was much less competently made. Electronic Games, on the other hand, gave a positive review, saying that the game was not intended to be taken seriously.

You don't play this shooter for fun. You play for penitence.

— PC Gamer's Richard Corbett on Isle of the Dead

Retrospective reviews for Isle of the Dead were also negative. Kurt Kalata from Hardcore Gaming 101 said that Rainmaker Software took the worst elements of point-and-click adventures and first-person shooters and turned them into "an overtly shlocky mess", criticizing the lack of feedback when taking damage and the death animations throughout the game. Kalata, however, believed that the developers were going for a "Z-grade Troma-style game" and almost succeeded at doing so. PC Gamer's Richard Corbett, in his "Saturday Crapshoot" column, criticized its structure and the in-game map for being unhelpful. Corbett later called it one of the weirdest shooters of the 1990s. Adam Smith of Rock Paper Shotgun called Isle of the Dead one of the worst games he had ever played, saying that it doesn't get anything right thematically or gameplay-wise. PopHorror was more generous, declaring that "if you want a trip down memory lane to what jump started the horror genre in the 1990s, then download Isle of the Dead. If you can handle the goofy graphics and looping theme, you may be able to survive. Maybe."

== See also ==
- The Fortress of Dr. Radiaki
- Nerves of Steel
