= Coded Arms: Contagion =

2007 video game

- Developer: Creat Studios
- Publisher: Konami
- Platform: PlayStation Portable
- Release: NA: September 18, 2007; EU: March 14, 2008; AU: April 10, 2008
- Genre: First-person shooter
- Modes: Single-player, multiplayer

Coded Arms: Contagion is a first-person shooter video game developed by Russian studio Creat Studios. It is the sequel to Coded Arms. The game was originally scheduled to be released in North America on March 27, 2007, but was delayed by six months.

== Gameplay ==
The gameplay is similar to the first game, Coded Arms. However, this time player has only 13 levels (and a training) with no random geometry, plus challenges which are available upon completion of a level. Full Motion Videos, storyline and much bigger landscapes are present. The player has to collect special point to upgrade his armor, health, and weapons. A new feature is included: the ability to hack computer panels, doors and turrets. The game's levels are divided into three portions: Industrial Zone, Military Zone, and A.I.D.A. Core. The only step back (compared to the previous title) is the absence of ragdoll physics.

== Story ==
Grant entering A.I.D.A.

Special forces major Grant is part of an elite unit brought in to test and analyze the effectiveness of the reconfigured A.I.D.A. combat simulation program. After spreading aggressively through Earth's networks, and absorbing all the information it encountered, it turned into a program that required users to completely digitize their personalities to jack in, risking their lives for access to the rich cache of data. After a massive undertaking, A.I.D.A. has finally been contained.

Its code rewritten, the program is once again restricted for use in military training exercises. Active testing is in progress as the final touches are being applied to bring the system back online. At first, everything about the operation is routine, but it soon appears that the program is not stable. Grant, trapped in A.I.D.A. and guided by General Clark, has to locate the missing Bravo Team and defeat the new menace: a viral outbreak that corrupts every date encountered, caused by a group known only as "Maelstrom".

== Reception ==
Reception

Aggregate score
Aggregator	Score
Metacritic	56/100

Review scores
Publication	Score
Electronic Gaming Monthly	5.33/10 (Note: Three critics of Electronic Gaming Monthly gave the game each a score of 7/10, 4/10, and 5/10 in an early review.)
Eurogamer	4/10
Famitsu	29/40
Game Informer	6.75/10
GameDaily	6/10
GameSpot	6/10
GameSpy	2/5
GameZone	6/10
IGN	5.8/10
Pocket Gamer	2.5/5
PlayStation: The Official Magazine	4/10

The game received "mixed" reviews according to the review aggregation website Metacritic. Many magazines gave the game mixed or unfavorable reviews while it was still in development. In Japan, where the game was ported for release on September 27, 2007, Famitsu gave it a score of one eight and three sevens for a total of 29 out of 40. GamePro said of the game in its early review, "The fact remains that just because it is a portable game doesn't mean our standards have been lowered." (Note: GamePro gave the game 4/5 for graphics, two 2.5/5 scores for sound and control, and 3/5 for fun factor in an early review.)
