= Parkan (series) =

- Developer: Nikita Online
- Series: Parkan
- Platform: Microsoft Windows
- Release: September 1997
- Genres: Space simulator, first-person shooter
- Mode: Single-player

Parkan is a series of video games that combine space flight and trade simulation with first-person shooter style game play. Namely it allows players to board ships. "Parkan" is the name of the spaceship, which means boomerang for its shape.

- Parkan: The Imperial Chronicles (Russian: Паркан: Хроника Империи) - the first game of the series, space simulator and first-person shooter
- Parkan: Iron Strategy (Russian: Паркан: Железная Стратегия) - a spin-off first-person shooter and real-time strategy and mecha
- Parkan: Iron Strategy. Part 2 (Russian: Паркан: Железная Стратегия. Часть 2) - a direct sequel to Parkan: Iron Strategy game.
- Parkan II (Russian: Паркан II) - the newest game space simulator and first-person shooter

== Development ==
Parkan: The Imperial Chronicles was originally published in 1997. In 2016, Nikita released the game on the GOG.com platform.
