= You Are Empty =

2006 video game

- Developers: Mandel ArtPlains; Digital Spray Studios
- Publisher: 1C Company
- Director: Pavel Muzok
- Designer: Denis Volchenko
- Programmers: Dmitry Sytnik; Yuriy Dobronravin; Andrii Frolov; Victor Reutskiy; Vyacheslav Korotayev
- Writers: Yaroslav Singayevsky; Denis Volchenko
- Composer: Dimitriy Dyachenko
- Engine: DS2 Engine
- Platform: Microsoft Windows
- Release: RUS: October 27, 2006; POL: April 13, 2007; NA: October 16, 2007
- Genre: First-person shooter
- Mode: Single-player

You Are Empty is a first-person shooter video game by Ukrainian developers Mandel ArtPlains and Digital Spray Studios. It was published by 1C Company in 2006. Atari later released the game with English translation and voice acting in 2007.

The game takes place in an alternate-history Soviet Union, where a large-scale experiment intended to ensure the global victory of communism goes wrong, turning most of the population into insane mutants. The protagonist wakes up in a ruined hospital inhabited solely by these mutants and must fight to survive and unravel the mystery behind the disaster.

== Gameplay ==
You Are Empty features basic first-person shooter gameplay. The player traverses a series of maps set in specific Soviet locations, such as a massive, ruined metropolis or a kolkhoz, while facing enemies based on Soviet propaganda archetypes, including workers, firefighters, welders with attached propellers, elderly peasants armed with shotguns, Red Army soldiers with Mosin-Nagant rifles, and giant mutant hens.

Players can acquire various weapons, including a wrench for melee combat and firearms based primarily on real-world models like the Mauser C96 pistol or the PPSh-41 submachine gun. The only exception to this realism is a large electric cannon that fires arcing discharges, it is the final weapon the player receives.

In addition to combat, the level design incorporates elements of exploration and the search for keys or switches. Players can find notes within the environments that enrich the narrative, revealing details about the experiment that triggered the game's events or offering hints for progressing through the levels. Medicine vials are the primary means of restoring health (which has a maximum limit of 99).

== Synopsis ==
=== Setting ===
The game is set in an alternate 1950s where the Soviet Union, under the leadership of Joseph Stalin, had become a world leader in science and technology. Its next major leap involved the creation of a massive antenna tower capable of broadcasting a psychic signal that would transform the Soviet population into superhumans. However, the experiment proved disastrous, as the signal ended up killing the population or turning them into insane mutants.

Occasionally, animated monochrome cutscenes are shown that tell the story of the chief scientist behind the project. As a child, he discovered he possessed psychic abilities that allowed him to control other living beings, such as animals or even people. Having become a scientific prodigy, he devises plans to expand his power and broadcast it to the entire world, aiming to initiate a "great transformation."

=== Plot ===
The game's protagonist, a mid-ranking military officer, is knocked unconscious in a car accident while returning home from guard duty. Upon waking in a hospital, he finds the world in ruins and overrun by murderous mutants. While investigating the disaster and fighting for survival, the officer encounters survivors who provide him with information about what happened. Upon reaching the city council of a massive metropolis, he is taken by Soviet Army units to the chairman of the council, who is visibly shaken by the ensuing catastrophe. However, realizing the protagonist might be able to reach the root cause of it all, he decides to hand him a roll of film containing information about the project before taking his own life with a Mauser pistol.

The information leads the protagonist to the antenna tower, where he finds the chief scientist wired directly into the massive mechanism. The scientist congratulates the officer on making it this far, demonstrating that the "Great Transformation" was not a total failure, as it created a perfect, self-sufficient human being capable of fighting for himself. Revealing that he has little time left, the scientist presents the officer with two choices: stay and rule over what remains of the world, or use the antenna to turn back time and prevent the experiment from ever taking place. To save the world, the officer chooses to turn back time, returning to the same morning seen in the opening scene, this time, however, he draws his pistol and shoots the scientist in the head, subsequently being beaten by Stalin's bodyguards. With the calamity averted, the world proceeds along its actual timeline.

== Development ==
A demo was showcased at the 2003 Russian Game Developers Conference (KRI), where the game won the award for Best Game Without a Publisher.

At E3 2006, the developers of You Are Empty gave a private demonstration of the game to GameSpot, which showed interest in the physics engine, commenting that it might "have some unexpected consequences."

== Reception ==
The game received unfavorable reviews from critics. On the review aggregator GameRankings, the game had an average score of 40% based on 15 reviews. On Metacritic, the game had an average score of 34 out of 100, based on 14 reviews.

Brett Todd of GameSpot gave the game a rating of 1.5 out of 10, stating "It's hard to imagine how anybody could make the Stalin-era Soviet Union less appealing than it was in reality, but You Are Empty sure does the trick." Todd described the game as an "atrocity" and a "painful exercise in shooter stupidity." Todd opined the English translations from the original Russian are "awful", the game has a slow, boring pace, the monsters are "mostly ripped off from other games" (mentioning Doom, Painkiller, Serious Sam, Silent Hill, and Redneck Rampage), and the missions are "geared around hunts for keys and levers." Todd did say that "some of the music can be effectively creepy." Todd ended his review by saying, "the nihilistic name of the game is never explained. Now move on with your life and try to pretend that games like You Are Empty don't exist."

== Re-Release ==
On August 18, 2026, ZOOM Platform announced that You Are Empty would be re-released for modern systems, featuring bug fixes and new features, under the title You Are Empty: Absolute Edition. The game's trailer was also released on that same date. Development is being handled by Jordan Freeman Group and ZOOM Platform, with publishing by Strategy First and BillionTech. You Are Empty: Absolute Edition was released on the game's 20th anniversary, on October 27, 2026.

On November 6, 2026, Denis Volchenko filed a DMCA takedown request claiming that the steam release was done without proper authorization, stating that, "The current publishers have no valid legal rights to monetize my visual assets or sell this project for profit." Volchenko claims that the release was only authorized to be a non-commercial free release as a "fan modification" of the original game. Shortly after, the game was delisted from steam. The developers of the re-release responded by denying the legitimacy of Volchenko's ownership of the game, and labeling his efforts to remove the game as harassment and his behavior as childish and immature. The developers have also stated that they are making an effort to reinstate the game to the platform and are going to dispute Volchenko's claim through proper legal proceedings, as well as thanking the community for their continued support.
