= Ancient Wars: Sparta =

2006 video game

- Developer: World Forge
- Publisher: Playlogic
- Director: Vladimir Nikolaev
- Producers: Jochen Hamma; Michael Hengst; Torsten Hess
- Designer: Roman Volkov
- Programmer: Evgeniy Lominin
- Artists: Roman Volkov; Dmitriy Rychkov; Yuriy Tkachuk
- Writer: Egor Gudovich
- Composer: Dynamedion
- Platform: Windows
- Release: RU: December 8, 2006; EU: April 20, 2007; NA: April 24, 2007; AU: October 15, 2007
- Genre: Real-time strategy
- Modes: Single-player, multiplayer

Ancient Wars: Sparta (Note: Russian: Войны древности: Спарта, romanized: Voyny drevnosti: Sparta, lit. 'Wars of Antiquity: Sparta') is a 2006 real-time strategy video game for Windows. Developed by World Forge and published by Playlogic, it was released in Russia in December 2006, in Europe and North America in April 2007, and in Australia in October 2007.

Set in the Eastern Mediterranean during the years 485-479 BC, the game features three playable races (Egyptians, Persians, and Spartans) each of whom has their own campaign, featuring fictional depictions of historical figures such as Xerxes I, Leonidas I, Demaratus, Inaros II, Pausanias, Mardonius, Artabanus, Megabyzus, and Miltiades. Although the three campaigns are separate, they do combine to loosely tell an overarching story, depicting the Egyptian uprising against Persian rule, the Second Persian invasion of Greece, and Sparta's resistance to Persia, culminating in the Battles of Thermopylae, Salamis, and Plataea.

World Forge's debut title, the game featured a newly designed game engine dubbed the Ancient Wars Engine (AWE) which World Forge specifically developed for Sparta. Only a few days after the game was first published, World Forge accused publishers Playlogic of failing to provide the agreed-upon funding during development. Issuing a breach of contract notice, World Forge claimed that the rights to the game had reverted to them, so they sued Playlogic. The District Court of Amsterdam later ruled that the game's rights were owned by Playlogic and had never reverted to World Forge. The game was originally intended as the first entry in a franchise to bear the Ancient Wars name, but no further titles were made under that banner. However, World Forge did release three further real-time strategy games using the AWE and very similar gameplay - Fate of Hellas (released as Great War Nations: The Spartans in North America), The Golden Horde (released as Great War Nations: The Mongols in some territories), and Age of Alexander (released as Sparta II: Alexander the Great in some territories).

Ancient Wars received mixed reviews. Although some critics praised the graphics and the ability for the player to arm their soldiers with opponents' discarded weaponry, many found the game's pace too slow and the combat devoid of strategy. The voice acting and script were singled out as especially poor, and most critics felt the game was unoriginal, bringing nothing new to the genre, and failing to stand out from current and previous real-time strategy titles such as Medieval II: Total War, Supreme Commander, and Command & Conquer 3: Tiberium Wars.

== Gameplay ==
Ancient Wars: Sparta is a real-time strategy game, controlled via a point and click interface, in which the primary goal on most maps is to build a strong enough army to defeat the opponent or opponents by destroying their settlement, or, on occasion, killing a specific unit in their army. To achieve this end, the player must engage in some basic economic micromanagement, such as gathering resources, constructing buildings, and researching new technologies, abilities, weapons, ships, and war machines.

=== Game modes ===
The game can be played in one of two modes; single-player or multiplayer. In single-player mode, the player can play either campaign missions or individual non-campaign games. In campaign mode, the player must complete a series of missions, the goal of many of which is to defeat the computer controlled opponent or opponents by destroying their settlement. Most missions have several primary objectives, which usually must be completed sequentially, and often one or more secondary objectives. Secondary objectives are not necessary to complete the mission, but they do reward the player with troops or resources if completed. The game features twenty-six missions (a nine-mission campaign for the Egyptians, an eight-mission campaign for the Persians, and a nine-mission campaign for the Spartans). The campaigns are independent of one another and can be played in any order. The missions within each campaign, however, are linear, and each mission only becomes available when the previous one has been completed.

In non-campaign single-player and multiplayer modes, the player chooses the map on which to play, and then selects the type of game, choosing from "No other players" (the player plays the mission without any opposition), "AI" (the player competes against only computer-controlled opponents), and "Open" (the player competes against either a combination of computer-controlled and human-controlled opponents, or all human controlled opponents). Multiplayer mode allows for up to four players or any combination of human players and computer-controlled opponents. Multiplayer games can be played either via a LAN or online, using GameSpy.

=== Resources and workers ===
Whether playing in single-player or multiplayer mode, each game begins roughly the same way; the player is positioned at a set location on the map, usually with a prebuilt base building, and often with a certain number of soldiers and/or workers. The game features three types of resource; gold, wood and food. Gold and wood are required to construct buildings, research new weaponry and technologies, equip warriors with weapons and shields, and build war machines such as catapults, siege towers, and chariots. Food is required to sustain the army and workforce. If food reserves drop to zero, the number of health points of all combat units begins to dwindle, eventually dropping to 10% of the maximum amount. The player can acquire gold by building goldmines, wood by clearing forests, and food by constructing buildings such as farms or sending workers out to hunt.

Screenshot of Ancient Wars showing various unit types - on the left are four workers constructing a building; to their right are eight Spartan soldiers in a column formation, with each soldier mounted on a horse; further right is a group of miscellaneous soldiers.

Workers (slaves for the Egyptians and Persians, Helots for the Spartans) are required to construct buildings and gather wood. They also occupy and perform the requisite task of each building, whether the building is a resource building such as a goldmine or farm, a research building such as a drafting room or House of Knowledge, or a manufacturing building such as an armoury or forge. Workers can be directly controlled by the player and can be ordered to repair buildings, collect enemy weapons, hunt game, build ships and war machines, and, if necessary, fight. Each worker must be recruited manually in the player's base building. Resources have to be transported by workers from their point of origin (such as a goldmine, forest, or farm) to either the base building or a specific storage building, but they do not have to be transported to building sites, to buildings where they are being used for research or manufacturing, or to buildings that are being upgraded.

Each of the three races has its own unique buildings, heroes, soldiers, support troops, special abilities, and war machines. For example, the Egyptian headquarters is the Pharaoh House, the Persian is the Tachara, and the Spartan is the Acropolis. Each of their economic models is also slightly different. For example, the Spartans require specific storage for all three resources, whereas the Egyptians and the Persians require storage for only food and wood; the Egyptians can deploy a larger variety of support troops than the Spartans and the Persians; the Persians can breed several types of animal unavailable to the Spartans and the Egyptians; the Spartans can build war machines unavailable to the Egyptians and the Persians. In this way, the strengths and weaknesses of one race are designed to balance the strengths and weaknesses of the others.

=== Combat ===
All soldiers are recruited at either a barracks or a shooting range. The game features three basic types of soldier; Light (Nubian Mercenaries for the Egyptians, Kara Warriors for the Persians, and Psiloi for the Spartans), Medium (Mighty Nadsez for the Egyptians, Nobles for the Persians, and Spartiate for the Spartans), and Heavy (Pharaoh's Guards for the Egyptians, Immortals for the Persians, and Hoplites for the Spartans). These are base units only, and the player is free to create melee warriors and archers from all three types of unit, using a variety of equipment and armour combinations. Each unit has three slots for customization, with the player free to choose from a primary weapon, secondary weapon and, depending on the primary and secondary weapon, a shield. So, for example, a player may equip some Kara Warriors with a sword and shield, some with a bow, some with both a sword and a bow (which weapon is their primary weapon is dictated by where they were trained, barracks or shooting range), and some with a sword, shield, and bow. Players can order soldiers equipped with more than one weapon to switch weapons at any time.

Initially, the player is restricted to the base unit's default equipment, but once research has begun, more weapons and armour become available. Once researched, all items have to be manufactured. Each process (research and manufacture) costs resources and takes time, and once a piece of equipment has been researched and manufactured, the player can equip it to any unit. Both research and manufacture are one-time procedures and are not required every time the player equips that particular piece. However, producing a unit of any kind also costs resources, and the more advanced the equipment, the more expensive the unit and the longer the training. An alternative way to equip soldiers is to have workers collect the equipment of defeated enemies. This equipment can then be used by the player to equip their own army at no cost, and with no research or manufacture time.

Screenshot of combat in Ancient Wars, showing a Spartan force (red) fighting a Persian force (blue). The Spartan soldiers are glowing, indicating that a spell has been cast on them by the mystery (who is the currently selected character in the HUD); Persian war elephants are also visible, one of which is carrying four Persians, the other of which is without riders, and thus available for the Spartans to commandeer.

When the player's units see enemies, they react automatically, depending on which stance the player has selected from the four available; "Aggressive" (attack enemies as soon as they come within range, and pursue fleeing enemies indefinitely), "Defensive" (attack enemies as soon as they come within range, but only pursue them a short distance), "Hold the ground" (units defend their position and do not pursue the enemy), and "Passive" (units do not attack the enemy unless they are attacked first). As well as these four stances, the player also has three formations from which to choose: line, column, and free formation.

Heroes are also an important element of combat. They have more health points and are stronger than normal units, and they can acquire special abilities when they level up. In some missions, if the player's hero dies, the mission is immediately over. Players also have access to support units - for the Egyptians there are Horus Priests (capable of blinding and burning enemies), Anubis Priests (can weaken enemy armour and poison enemy soldiers), and Bast Priestesses (can heal troops and call a panther into battle); for the Persians there are Fire Acolytes (can attack enemies with mystical fire) and Healers (can see through the fog of war and place healing tents on the battlefield); and for the Spartans there are Mysteries (can heal individual troops and see through the fog of war) and Flautists (can raise troop morale, making them stronger in battle).

Another element of combat is the use of war machines. The Egyptians use battering rams, throwing machines, and heavy battle chariots; the Persians use battering rams and stationary ballistae; and the Spartans use chariots, battle chariots, siege towers, and catapults. War machines must be researched before they can be manufactured, and once built, they require either workers or soldiers to operate them. As with equipment, the player can commandeer the opponents' war machines. The game also features naval combat, with three different types of ship available: light battleships (Biremes for the Spartans), heavy battleships (Triremes for the Spartans), and barges, which are defenceless and are used to transport large groups of soldiers and equipment. Both the Spartans and the Egyptians require a dock to build ships, whereas the Persians can build ships directly on the shore. As with equipment and war machines, the player can commandeer the opponents' ships. There are also mountable animals available. The Spartans and Egyptians can only breed horses, but the Persians can breed horses, armoured horses, camels, elephants, and war elephants. Horses can take one soldier, camels can take two, and elephants can take four. As with equipment, war machines, and ships, the player can commandeer the opposition's animals.

== Campaigns ==
The game features three fictionalised storylines based upon real events in the histories of Egypt, Persia, and Sparta. Narratively, the campaigns are relatively independent of one another, although they do overlap at times. (Note: For example, the Battle of Thermopylae is depicted in both the Persian and Spartan campaigns. Although the events depicted in the game are real, the manner in which they are depicted is fictional. For example, Inaros' revolt against Persian rule in Egypt began in 460 BC, several years after the death of Xerxes, and around 20 years after the Battle of Thermopylae. In the game, however, it takes place shortly after Xerxes takes the throne, with Inaros helped by Leonidas.)

=== The Egyptian campaign ===
The campaign begins in 485 BC. It is 40 years since the Achaemenid conquest of Egypt established the Twenty-Seventh Dynasty and effectively turned the country into a province of the Achaemenid Empire. Over the years, numerous rebellions flared up but all failed, to the point where much of the populace now accept their status as subjects of Persia. In 486, Xerxes became King of Kings of the Empire, instituting a policy of aggressive expansion, colonisation, and subjugation. Rewarding those who are loyal to him by appointing them as satraps of conquered lands, Xerxes sends one of his most violent supporters, Megabyzus, to Egypt. Once there, Megabyzus forces the Egyptians to fight as expendable frontline soldiers in the Persian army.

In the town of Sais, Inaros (grandson of Psamtik III, last Pharaoh of the Twenty-Sixth Dynasty) has been appointed to oversee the Egyptians' training. Although life is hard, and he laments Egypt's situation, he finds solace in his lover, Meritaton. However, on the day he intends to propose to her, he arrives in her village to find it destroyed, and Meritaton missing. Her father, Ahmose, explains that Persian troops sacked the village and took Meritaton to be Megabyzus's concubine. Furious, Inaros determines to overthrow Persian rule.

Using the troops he has been training for the Persian army, Inaros leads a successful attack against a nearby Persian camp. He then takes his men into the jungles on the banks of the Nile, to the lost city of Elbo, where he recruits several Nubian tribes. This done, he heads to Libya to bolster his strength further. Shortly thereafter, Leonidas, king of Sparta, lands in Egypt with plans to lay siege to Sais. Seeing this as an opportunity to enlist a powerful new ally, Inaros forms an alliance.

The combined forces of the Greeks and the Egyptians capture Sais, and Inaros then marches to Memphis, where Megabyzus has assembled a massive army. Joined by their Spartan and Libyan allies, the Egyptians attack Memphis, taking the city, and killing Megabyzus. Inaros is then reunited with Meritaton.

=== The Persian campaign ===
In 490 BC, five years prior to the Egyptian revolt, the first Persian invasion of Greece ends with King Darius returning to Persia in disgrace having been defeated by the Athenians at the Battle of Marathon. Determined to conquer Greece, over the next four years, Darius raises another army and chooses his first-born son Xerxes as his successor over Xerxes' brother, Artabuzes. Behind the scenes, Xerxes had secretly enlisted the aid of the exiled king of Sparta, Demaratus, who had agreed to help Xerxes become king, as long as Xerxes promised to appoint Demaratus satrap of Sparta once the Persians had conquered Greece.

After announcing Xerxes as his successor, Darius dies before he can begin a second invasion. Artabuzes attempts to stage a coup, but he is defeated and killed by an army led by Demaratus and Xerxes's senior-most general, Mardonius. The duo are then dispatched to Egypt to quell the ongoing revolt. They do so, killing Inaros in the process. Xerxes next invades India, where multiple victories fill him with confidence, and despite the warnings of his counsellor Artabanus that he is pushing the army too hard, he continues invading new territory. When a small group of Persians rebel, Demaratus, Mardonius, and Hydarnes brutally kill them.

Xerxes then turns his attention to Sparta. At the Battle of Thermopylae, Demaratus and Hydarnes are killed, but the Spartans are defeated. However, hearing of their courage and sacrifice, the previously-passive Greek city-states rise up. Xerxes, obsessed with conquering all of the known world, and against the advice of Artanbanus, orders his weary army to continue the fight without allowing them to rest. Amid the Battle of Plataea, with Mardonius dead and the Persians losing to the Greeks, Xerxes looks for Artabanus, but he is unable to find him.

=== The Spartan campaign ===
The campaign begins in 480 BC, with the second Persian invasion of Greece underway. Leonidas has urged his countrymen to put aside their differences and unite against the Empire, whilst he heads for Thermopylae with a small force. With the rest of Greece, including even Spartan civilians, thinking his resistance is doomed to failure, Leonidas's nephew Pausanias is sent to talk him out of fighting. Leonidas, however, refuses to back down and tells Pausanias the story of his early days as king.

40 years prior, Leonidas's father, Anaxandridas, exiled his own brother, Demaratus, and seized the throne, leading Sparta into an age of aggression. When he died, Leonidas inherited a land devastated by conflict and surrounded by enemies, but he continued his father's belligerent ways. Shortly thereafter, Leonidas faces a rebellion in Helos. When his counsellor, Candaules, opines that the reason for the revolt is that Anaxandridas was too cruel, Leonidas argues that the revolt is evidence that his father was far too lenient. Leonidas is then approached by Demaratus, who offers his services, and with their combined forces, they put down the rebellion. Immediately thereafter, however, Demaratus betrays Leonidas, and attacks Sparta. As he returns to the city, Leonidas comes to see the truth in Candaules's cautions, accepting that by continuing his father's violence, he has brought hardship on himself and Sparta. He arrives to find Sparta under siege by Demaratus and an army of Athenians. Rousing his men, he leads an attack against Demaratus's much larger and better-fortified army, and against all odds, they defeat the invaders, although Demaratus escapes.

Leonidas's story of defending Sparta from a larger force inspires Pausanias to join Leonidas, who acknowledges that due to his own war-mongering, none of the other states trust the Spartans, and thus, he's hoping the upcoming battle will show the others that Sparta can defend them. At the Battle of Thermopylae, Demaratus is killed, and Leonidas sacrifices himself to allow Pausanias to escape, appointing him as general of the army. After hearing of the sacrifice made by the Spartans, thousands of Greeks join the struggle, even the Athenians, who are led by Miltiades, a veteran of the Battle of Marathon. At the Battle of Salamis, the Greeks are victorious, breaking the back of the Persian navy. As the Battle of Platea also swings in the Greeks' favour, Mardonius advises Xerxes to retreat to Miletus and stand his ground. Xerxes does so, but he is once again defeated, and when his barge is destroyed, he drowns. In the wake of their victory, Pausanias declares that "the time for enmity is over," telling Miltiades, "let our friendship be the shield that protects our land forever."

== Development ==
The game was announced in February 2005 by German public relations firm Interactive Media Consulting (IMC). Known at the time as Sparta: Ancient Wars, it was touted as the first in a proposed series of historical-based real-time strategy games under the Ancient Wars banner. IMC stated that it would feature three campaigns and a total of 30 missions, also stressing that there would be no unit limit per mission and that naval combat would be a major part of the gameplay. Unusually for a video game announcement, neither the developer nor the publisher were revealed, although IMC did say the developer was an "international known [sic] development team."

In April 2005, Russian studio World Forge was revealed as the developers, with Ancient Wars set to be their first game. In an interview with IGN, producer Torsten Hess and IMC's head of communications Ingo Horn explained that the game had begun development early in 2004, with IMC coming on board in August. Initially hired to "analyse the game documents and storyline", IMC came to feel that the game was a potential triple-A title and that World Forge "needed support to push it into the right direction for the Western market."

Hess and Horn explained that the game would feature three races - Egyptians, Persians, and Spartans - and there would be a ten-mission campaign for each race, with the three storylines forming a larger overarching historically-accurate narrative. They also spoke of their hopes that Sparta would be the inaugural entry in an Ancient Wars franchise, emphasising the importance of the game's historical setting;

the name Ancient Wars has been chosen to establish a brand for potential future RTS games like Sparta, but with different historical content. It is new for the genre of RTS games that actual events and historical facts will be the base for such a game. In the past, many games were set in such scenarios, but were freer in terms of storyline, characters, and units. With Sparta, we have put much effort into research about the time, and living and dying in those days. Also, we did not implement any fantasy or scientific elements in the game, like magic or gods. So, everything you will encounter is a real part of that time.

Lamenting the quality of current RTS games, arguing that the genre has become "stiff and less innovative than other genres", they expressed their hopes that Sparta would "bring new life to a rather stagnant category."

Speaking of combat and the AI, they explained,

we are going in a relatively free direction with the AI. Of course, the stone, scissor, paper rules play a big part in Sparta, but in terms of tactics, we will add several features to the genre that are totally unique and have never been seen before. They will really add stunning new gaming experiences, enable much greater tactical variety, and require much better understanding of ancient warfare. In most common ancient RTS games, it has just been kind of "which player had more and better units and tank-rushed the other fastest," but in Sparta, you will get several other possible ways to achieve your goals.

In June, Russian video game distributor Russobit-M announced that Dutch company Playlogic would be publishing the game. Playlogic were co-funding the development along with Play Ten Interactive. According to World Forge's development director, Vladimir Nikolaev, "the milestone split was such [that] the largest part of the funds was to come from Playlogic at the end of the development". The deal dictated that 20% of the overall funds were to be paid by Playlogic upon signing the agreement, 10% was to be paid when they approved the alpha, 10% when they approved the beta, 10% when they approved the localisation kit, and 50% when they approved the gold master.

In an interview with IGN in May 2006 a few days before E3, Horn expressed confidence that the game would be a commercial success, and stated he was looking forward to working on future Ancient Wars games; "when we release the next title in the Ancient Wars series, I am very much looking forward to more aggressive PR based on the success of Sparta."

Graphically, the game would utilise a newly developed game engine, dubbed the "Ancient Wars Engine" (AWE), which was specifically designed for Sparta, and specialised in displaying large vistas when the player is zoomed out, and high levels of detail when the player zooms in. The DirectX 9 based-engine is capable of vertex shading, self-shadowing, dynamic lighting, bloom effects, parallax scrolling, bump mapping, specular highlights, and shadow mapping. The game also features its own custom-built physics engine.

=== Legal issues ===
On June 18, 2007, World Forge posted on their website;

Software developer World Forge today announces that because of the multiple material breaches committed by Playlogic Publishing company [sic] the agreement for the development of Ancient Wars: Sparta game [sic] was terminated since 1st June 2007. All rights for Ancient Wars: Sparta since 1 June 2007 unconditionally were reverted back to World Forge, and Play Ten Interactive was appointed as a worldwide agent for the game on the same date.

On September 20, World Forge filed a lawsuit against Playlogic for ownership of the game's copyright. According to the lawsuit, Play Ten covered the early stages of the game's development, up to the time when Playlogic came on board. World Forge said that Playlogic's first milestone payment (upon approving the alpha) was to be paid in May 2006, but the money never materialised. They alleged that the next three milestones (upon approving the beta, the localisation kit, and the gold master) also went unpaid. The game was released in Europe on April 20, 2007 (although British company Eidos Interactive handled much of the regional distribution), and on April 24, World Forge and Play Ten issued a formal breach of contract notice against Playlogic. According to the lawsuit, Playlogic continued to promise payment, but no money ever changed hands, and when the breach cure period of thirty days expired, World Forge asserted that the rights to the game returned to them. Playlogic, however, maintained that they still own the copyright, thus the lawsuit.

In an interview with Gamasutra on September 26, World Forge's legal counsel, Anna Zaeva, explained that

Playlogic was the worldwide publisher, but distribution rights for most of the territories were acquired from them by Eidos. Now Eidos can't keep selling the game, because all rights returned to World Forge on the 1st of June. But Playlogic refuses to cooperate with them to resolve the situation [...] Since agreement was terminated due to multiple breaches committed by Playlogic, we're free to sell it to other publishers everywhere. Once we sign with publishers covering all major territories, we'll return the funds paid so far back to Playlogic.

Zaeva also asserted that Playlogic is "trying to register the trademark for the name of the game in the EU trademark office. They applied right after we notified them about the breach, which isn't a very clean move."

The following day, Playlogic issued a statement in which they said,

Playlogic read the contents of the interview and does not know where to start rebutting these allegations. Clearly these statements come down to ordinary hear say [sic] and speculations. Meanwhile, it is Playlogic who has sued World Forge in the Amsterdam court, and not the opposite, in order to obtain a court order stopping them from spreading these kinds of false statements. The obvious objective of World Forge is to interfere in the good business relation Playlogic has with its distributors, and to try to obtain the IP rights of this successful title.

In November, Playlogic won the lawsuit, when the District Court of Amsterdam concluded that all rights to the game belonged to them and had never reverted to World Forge. Playlogic's legal counsel, Jeroen Zandt, stated, "the judgment is clear as crystal. Playlogic owns the copyrights. WorldForge have to pay a penalty of €10,000 each time they state the contrary or refrain from publishing rectifications of former wrong statements."

== Reception ==
Reception

Aggregate score
Aggregator	Score
Metacritic	59/100

Review scores
Publication	Score
Eurogamer	4/10
GameSpot	6.3/10
GamesRadar+	2/5
IGN	5.8/10 (UK); 6/10 (NA)

The game received "mixed or average reviews," with an aggregate score of 59 out of 100 on Metacritic, based on twenty-one reviews.

GameSpot's Jason Ocampo scored it 6.3 out of 10. He praised the graphics, although also acknowledged that the game "looks not unlike most other 3D RTS games". Elsewhere, he found the gameplay derivative, the voice acting poor, and the difficulty too high. His biggest problem was that the game did very little to distinguish itself, calling it "very generic" and "indistinguishable from the rest of the genre". He also felt that it wasted the potential of its historical setting; "[there is] nothing particularly epic or grand about the gameplay or the story."

IGN's Dan Adams scored it 6 out of 10, arguing that combat was boring and lacked any kind of tactical complexity, with each mission "devolving into simply massing units and attacking." He also felt that building up an army takes too long, criticising the rate of resource acquisition and the time required for building, research, manufacture, and training. He was also critical of the voice acting, and he concluded, "Ancient Wars: Sparta doesn't have anything special in a genre filled with incredible game experiences."

In his UK review for IGN, Martin Korda scored it 5.8 out of 10, criticising the voice acting and the script, and writing "this is a game we've all played before in virtually every aspect." He was also critical of the game's "pedestrian pace", which he felt was its main problem, and the lack of tactics, arguing that most battles turn into "mass, mindless brawls". He did acknowledge that some of the later missions had more of a tactical element to them, and he liked the ability for the player to arm their own soldiers with enemy weapons, but he compared the game unfavourably to Medieval II: Total War, Supreme Commander, and Command & Conquer 3: Tiberium Wars.

GamesRadar+'s Troy Goodfellow scored it 2 out of 5, arguing "it offers little that is original." As with most critics, he was unimpressed with the voice acting and script, and he was critical of the rate of resource production and the time required to build, research, manufacture, and train. Overall, he felt the economic micromanagement was badly handled, wondering "why the developer decided to engage such a hopelessly antiquated design that takes classic RTS design and adds unnecessary levels of micromanagement."

Eurogamer's Rob Fahey scored it 4 out of 10, arguing that not only did the game fail to distinguish itself in the contemporary real-time strategy market, but it also failed to measure up to games of the past, calling it "a sub-Age of Empires affair." Of combat, he felt that "there's actually disappointingly little strategy involved" and every battle "tends to dissolve into a jumbled melee within seconds." He was also critical of the mission design, which he found very linear. He too felt the slow pace was a problem, and he cited the voice acting as particularly poor. Ultimately, he cited the game as "stuck in the past", and compared it unfavourably to titles such as Age of Mythology, Medieval II, Supreme Commander, and Command & Conquer 3.
