= Neuro =

Neuro may refer to:

- Neuro (video game), a 2006 video game
- Neurofunk, a subgenre of drum and bass
- Neuro-sama, an artificial intelligence VTuber
- Neuro: Supernatural Detective, a Japanese manga series
- Neuro (Ninjago), a character in Ninjago
