= Golden Horde (disambiguation) =

Golden Horde was a Mongol khanate established in the 13th century, and reaching from northern Central-Asia to the Black Sea.

Golden Horde may also refer to:

- The Golden Horde (band), an Irish rock group
- The Golden Horde (film), a 1951 historical adventure film
- The Golden Horde (video game), a 2008 real-time strategy game
- Golden Horde (horse) (born 2017), winner of the 2020 Commonwealth Cup
- The Golden Horde / Zolotaya Orda, 2018 Russian TV series.
