= Battle of Shahriar and Lion =

Ancient rock carvings in Persepolis, Iran

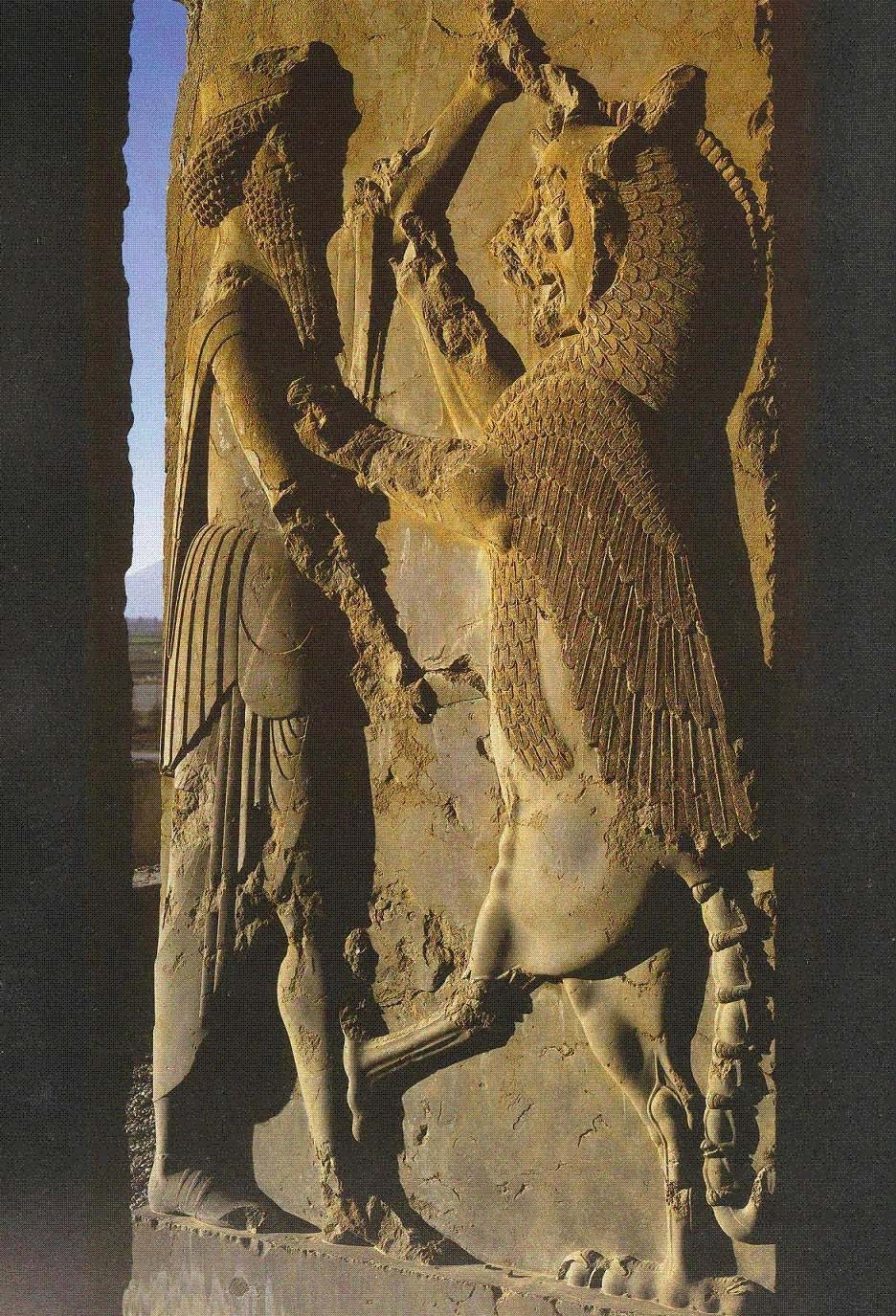
Carving of Battle of Shahriar and winged Lion; Tachara Palace gate-Persepolis

Battle of Shahriar (Achaemenid king) and Lion, "Confrontation between Shahriar and Lion" or "Shah's battle with lion", winged ox, Griffin, and winged lion refers to rock carvings in three palaces of Persepolis, especially the Palace of 100 Columns, which belongs to the transition period of the warrior-ship community in the era of Darius I until the no-war time of Xerxes I were made to represent him as a constructive and disciplinary king.

In the rule of the Achaemenids and from the era of Xerxes, the image of the Shahriar is seen in opposition to supernatural beings and beasts. At the same time, with the reign of his arrival, there were riots in the country, the defeat of Persians from Greece and the insurrections that took place in Babylon and Egypt. Shahryar made the second half of his rule in the country and played the role of the representative of the goddesses to maintain peace and tranquility in the affairs of the country.

== Semiotics ==
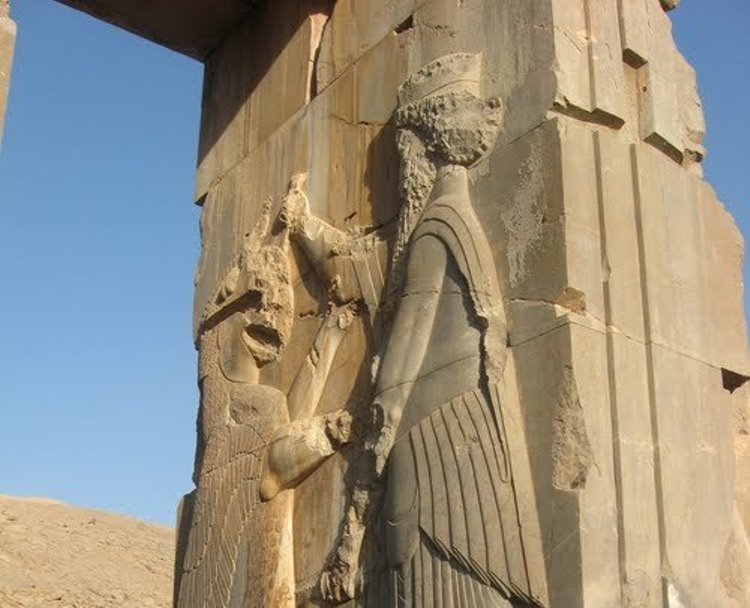
Carving of Battle of Shahriar and Griffin

The Achaemenid history shows that it has never been culturally seeking to unify its domains and territories; that is, did not try to unify language, religion, and worship, but it was exercising its power in different ways, one of which is the representation of images as a tool for expressing the will of power and the question of the legitimacy of their use. In fact, cognitive and imaginative analyses show that inscriptions and representations impose and transmit the image of power. Artists and industrialists who worked in different workshops did not have freedom to create artistic creation; they had to follow the exact guidelines of the great king's advisers.

From the inscriptions from the Xerxes period on the Gate of Nations, the Apadana stairs and the Southern Porch, the Tachara Palace and the Northern Porch, the Hadish palace and the stone tablets of the harem, the legitimacy of Ahura Mazda is seen as a constructive and regulating landowner in the community.

In the inscription of the Divan (Devils), which is one of the most important inscriptions of the period of Xerxes, it is written: "Ahuramazda helped me to defeat this land and restore order to him, and among these lands there was a place in which They replaced the past of the worship of the demons, after which I destroyed the divine sanctuary by the power of Ahuramazda ... "

In the carvings of this period, there have also been developments that can be seen in the increase of animal and combination designs, the designs of the Gate of Nations, the winged ox with a human head (Lamassu), the repetition of the carvings of the cow hunting by lion and the repetition and emphasis of the Shahriar battle designs with the combined animals and evils have been seen since this period. Some scholars believe that these designs influenced by the Assyrian palaces were inspired by artists who serves in Persian palaces, and the township that had been defeated far beyond its territory compensated for defeat in the internal fence of the realm.

=== Carvings of 100 Columns Palace ===
Four carvings have been carved on each column of gate, each of which is same structurally, and in each role, Shahriar's figure is unchanged in contrast to different beings and is the only role of animals that has been changed and replaced. This change has led to different interpretations of each role.

In these images, Shahriar portrays himself in three different situations to express the nature of his personality. Shahriar is killing beasts in all with calm and cold-blooded roles. In this carvings, the battle of the hunting ground and the supremacy of the material power of a monarch are not intended, but the reference to the struggle of the goddesses and the devil, the light and the darkness, are truthful with unrighteousness and calm against chaos (Doublethink).

==== Shahriar's Image ====
The hero who is the king is seen in these pictures instead of the official crown with a Persian hat. The form of the Shahriar's hands movement form and feet of the beasts that are defending themselves, and the animal entities shown here in various forms show a sense of contrast between them, but in terms of the form of standing the king who has a static and dynamic state, while his actions are indicative of a non-terrestrial struggle, as well as the calm and sure appearance of the king of victory and the type of Shahriar's dress and his waistline are all signs that create a different, unrealistic and symbolic meaning.

The hit that the Shahriar brings to beasts is quite symbolic, and in these images he goes out of the state of affairs and places himself in the symbol. In fact, Shahriar is out of the state of being and is at a certain level metatarsal and semantic. In fact, he portrays him in three stages, namely the goddess of the king, the physical and extraterrestrial power of hunting and super-power in the battle against evil and evil forces. One of the symbolic movements of Shahriar is the movement of his hands, which in these images, with one hand, took the horns of beasts that are in the center of their heads and hit them with another hand to the heart, meaning two important points of the beasts' organs.

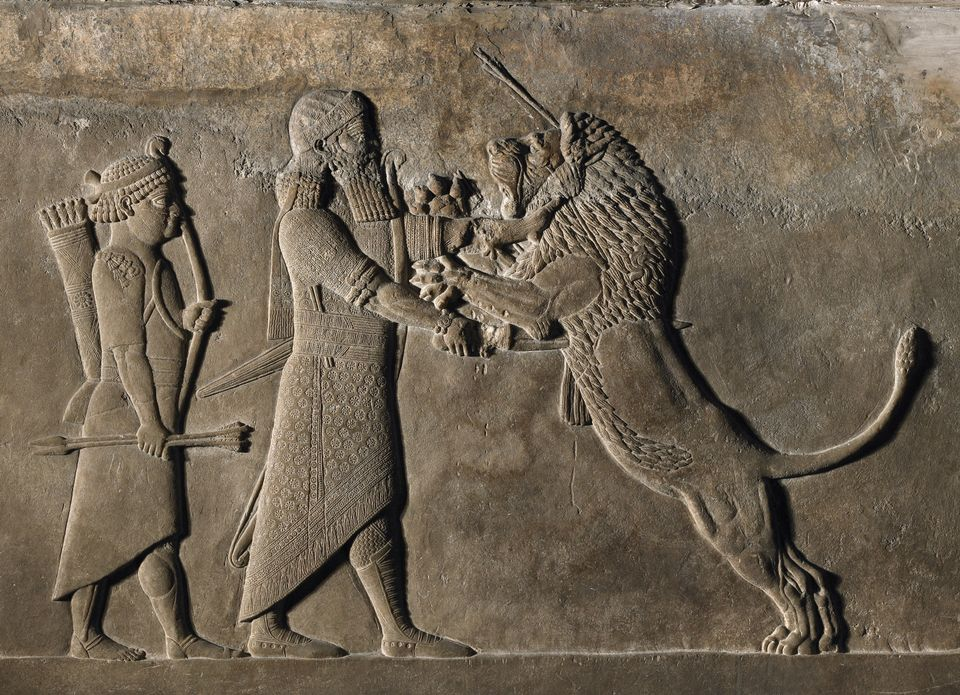
Assyrian King (Ashurbanipal) in combat with a lion

== Architecture ==
In the legend, there is a giant male lion. Like this images found on the Achaemenid Seals that shows Shahriar is hunting the lion footing on two legs as seen on the seal of Darius. This design can also be seen on the Assyrian seals, which originated from the northern Sumer and continued to the end of the civilization.

It is also suggested each of the four demons (representative of Evil) that have been shown on the walls of the main courtyard are defeated by Shahriar (representative of the good). Thus, the head of the defeated demon has been used under the ceilings as a capital referring to captivity and recruitment each of them; salvation is when demons are captured.

The use of arm (a spear seen in all the four images) suggested in the above the similarity of the sculptures of the head of the devils found under the ceilings with those seen in the main hall actually emphasizes the victory of good Achaemenid kings over the devil. Putting it in words, it is like the four devils depicted on the pendentives of the walls of the main hall represent their defeat and subjugation by goodness. That's why the head of the defeated devils are used as column capital under the ceilings, like an allusion to their entrapment and restraining as ‘salvation arrives when the devils are subdued.”

== Conclusion ==
The Achaemenid believed in the duality of the forces of good and evil and it was Shahriyar's duty to fight with evil forces that disrupted the order because the welfare of people. For this reason, various images have been drawn to illustrate his power in different situations. It seems that Xerxes has been doing extraordinary affairs and drawing images of evil according to the historical situation of the era in order to cover his materialistic flaws.

== Nowadays ==
In contemporary, the legend has been used in designing of the first logo of the Bank Melli Iran. It is also used in Iranian handcrafts to represent the Achaemenid motifs.

== Gallery ==
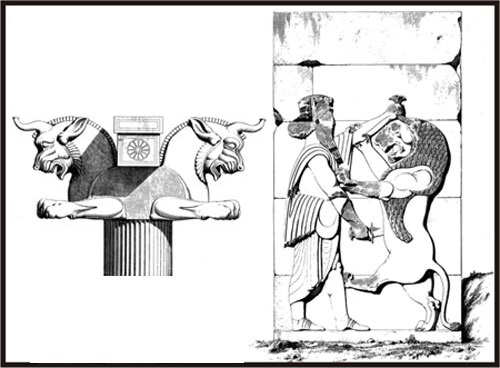
Battle of Shahriar and Lion legend on the wall of a gate and the lion as capital

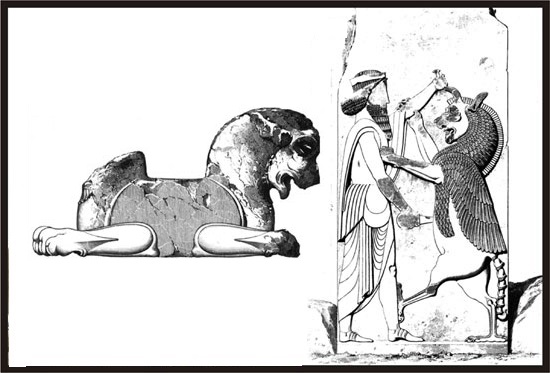
Battle of Shahriar and winged lion on the wall of gate and defeated devil as capital

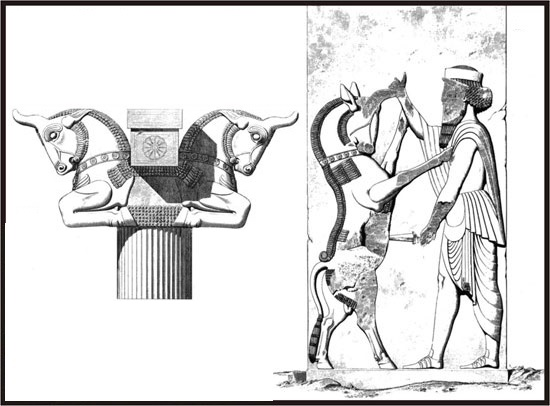
Battle of Shahriar and cow on the wall of gate and defeated devil as capital

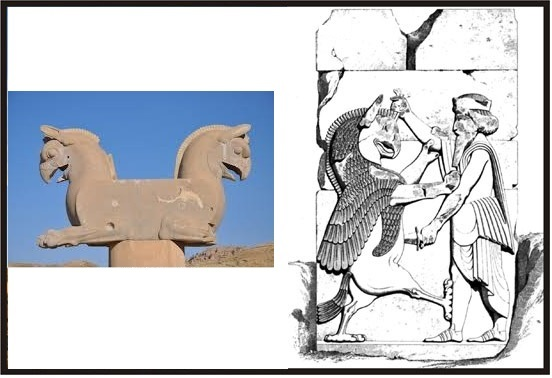
Battle of Shahriar and griffin on the wall of gate and defeated devil as capital

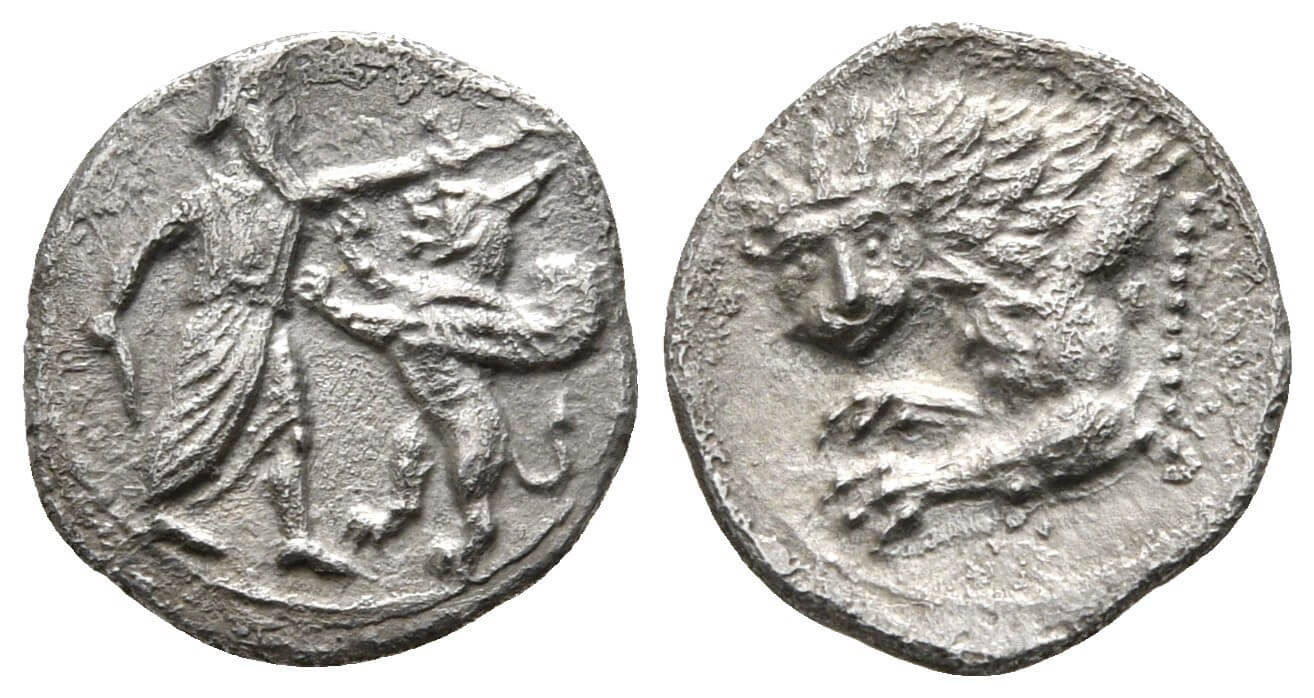
Achaemenid Stater coin minted in Clicia with the legend of Shahriar and Lion; 340 B.C.

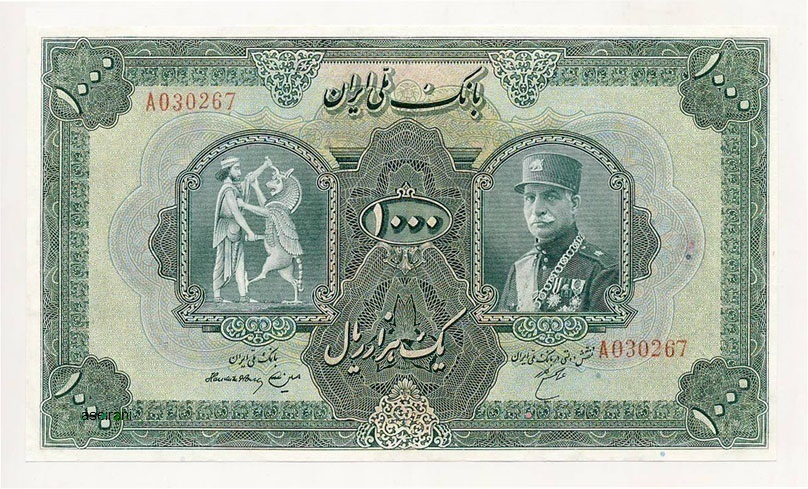
The battle of Shahriar and lion on Obverse of Reza Shah's banknote

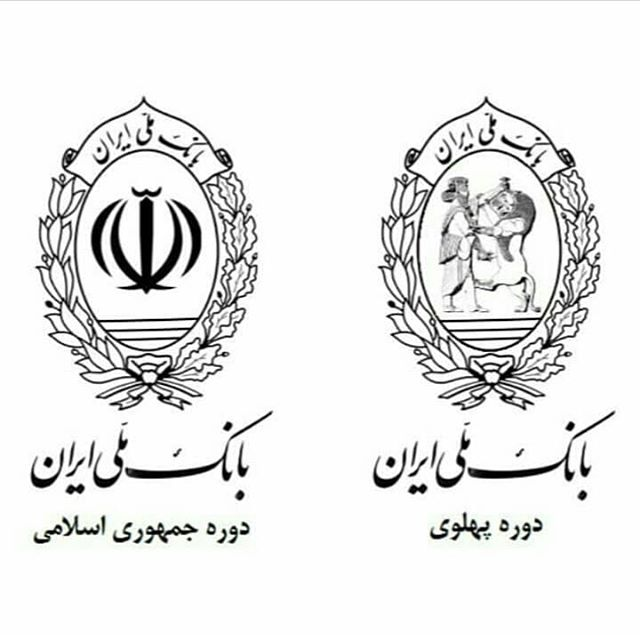
The battle legend on the first logo of Bank Melli Iran

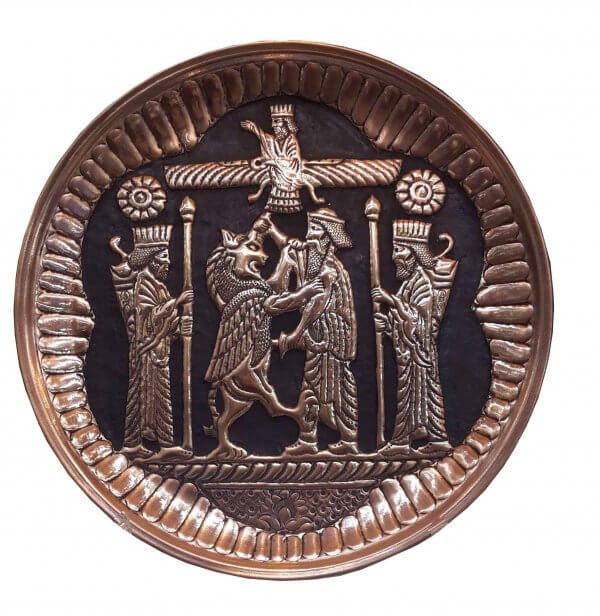
The battle of Shahriar and lion on a contemporary handcraft from Iran
