= World Forge =

Russian computer game developer (2004-2009)

- Industry: Video games
- Founded: End 2004
- Defunct: 2009
- Headquarters: Voronezh, Russia
- Products: Computer games
- Number of employees: 50
- Website: world-forge.com/eng

World Forge was a Russian video game developer located in Voronezh, Russia. The company was founded late 2004 and it employed about 50 people in 2008. It was established by Burut Creative Team as an expansion of its activities and focused on the development of real-time strategy games.

== Released games ==
- Ancient Wars: Sparta (2006, real-time strategy)
- Great War Nations: The Spartans (2007, real-time strategy)
- Fate of Hellas (2008, real-time strategy; released in some territories as Great War Nations: The Spartans)
- The Golden Horde (2008, real-time strategy; released in some territories as Great War Nations: The Mongols)
- Taras Bulba (2009, Roleplaying (RPG))
- Sparta 2: Alexander the Great (2009, real-time strategy; released in some territories as Age of Alexander)

== Cancelled games ==
- Battle for Atlantis (real-time strategy)
