= Fate of Hellas =

2007 video game

- Developer: World Forge
- Publishers: RU: Russobit-M; EU: JoWooD; NA: DreamCatcher Interactive; AU: n3vrf41l Publishing
- Director: Alexander Kochukov
- Producer: Roman Volkov
- Designer: Pavel Pashinsky
- Programmer: Alexander Kochukov
- Artist: Mikhail Babenko
- Writers: Stanislav Ivanov; Pavel Pashinsky; Vitaly Kuzmin; Dmitry Rychkov
- Composer: Dynamedion
- Platform: Windows
- Release: RU: December 20, 2007; EU: March 31, 2008; NA: May 1, 2008; AU: May 29, 2008
- Genre: Real-time strategy
- Modes: Single-player, multiplayer

Fate of Hellas (Note: Russian: Судьба Эллады, romanized: Sudʹba Ėllady) (released as Great War Nations: The Spartans in North America) is a 2007 real-time strategy video game for Windows. Developed by World Forge, it was published in Russia by Russobit-M in December 2007, in Europe by JoWooD in March 2008, and in North America and Australia by DreamCatcher Interactive and n3vrf41l Publishing (respectively) in May 2008. A spiritual successor to Ancient Wars: Sparta (it is often referred to as a "standalone expansion", but it is, in fact, a different game), Fate of Hellas uses the same game engine as the previous title - the Ancient Wars Engine (AWE) - and features identical gameplay. Two more World Forge games using this engine and gameplay style would follow - The Golden Horde and Age of Alexander.

The game features two campaigns. The first tells the story of the last days of Spartan military dominance in the Eastern Mediterranean (396-394 BC), as the Greek city-state attempts to establish Spartan hegemony throughout the Peloponnese. The second depicts the wars of Alexander the Great (336-326), looking at his conquests in Persia, Egypt, and India. The campaigns feature fictional depictions of historical figures such as Agesilaus II, Cleombrotus I, Darius II, Alexander the Great, Darius III, Parmenion, Khabbabash, and Taxiles, and depict such events as the Battle of Nemea, the Battle of Coronea, the Battle of Chaeronea, the Siege of Miletus, the Battle of Issus, and the Battle of the Hydaspes.

Fate of Hellas received mainly negative reviews. Although the graphics were lauded by some critics, the game was seen as generic and was felt to be too similar to its predecessor. Critics were especially unimpressed with the AI, pathfinding, lack of combat tactics, and LAN-only multiplayer.

== Gameplay ==
Fate of Hellas is a real-time strategy game, controlled via a point and click interface, in which the primary goal on most maps is to build a strong enough army to defeat the opponent or opponents by destroying their settlement, or, on occasion, killing a specific unit in their army. To achieve this end, the player must engage in some basic economic micromanagement, such as gathering resources, constructing buildings, and researching new technologies, abilities, weapons, ships, and war machines.

=== Game modes ===
The game can be played in one of two modes; single-player or multiplayer. In single-player mode, the player can play either campaign missions or individual non-campaign games. In campaign mode, the player must complete a series of missions, the goal of many of which is to defeat the computer controlled opponent or opponents by destroying their settlement. Most missions have several primary objectives, which usually must be completed sequentially, and often one or more secondary objectives. Secondary objectives are not necessary to complete the mission, but they do reward the player with troops or resources if completed. The game features fourteen missions (a seven-mission campaign for the Spartans and a seven-mission campaign for the Macedonians). The campaigns are independent of one another, and can be played in any order. The missions within each campaign, however, are linear, and each mission only becomes available when the previous one has been completed.

In non-campaign single-player and multiplayer modes, the player chooses the map on which to play, and then selects the type of game, choosing from "No other players" (the player plays the mission without any opposition), "AI" (the player competes against only computer-controlled opponents), and "Open" (the player competes against either a combination of computer-controlled and human-controlled opponents, or all human controlled opponents). Multiplayer mode allows for up to four players or any combination of human players and computer-controlled opponents. Multiplayer games can only be played via a LAN; there is no online multiplayer mode. In non-campaign single-player and multiplayer modes, players can play as the Spartans, Macedonians, Persians, or Egyptians (the latter two of whom play identically to how they played in Ancient Wars: Sparta).

=== Resources and workers ===
Whether playing in single-player or multiplayer mode, each game begins roughly the same way; the player is positioned at a set location on the map, usually with a prebuilt base building, and often with a certain number of soldiers and/or workers. The game features three types of resource; gold, wood and food. Gold and wood are required to construct buildings, research new weaponry and technologies, equip warriors with weapons and shields, and build war machines such as catapults, siege towers, and chariots. Food is required to sustain the army and workforce. If food reserves drop to zero, the number of health points of all combat units begins to dwindle, eventually dropping to 10% of the maximum amount. The player can acquire gold by building goldmines, wood by clearing forests, and food by constructing buildings such as farms or sending workers out to hunt.

Workers (Helots for the Spartans; slaves for the Macedonians) are required to construct buildings and gather wood. They also occupy and perform the requisite task of each building, whether the building is a resource building such as a farm, a research building such as a workshop, or a manufacture building such as a forge. Workers can be directly controlled by the player and can be ordered to repair buildings, collect enemy weapons, hunt game, and, if necessary, fight. Each worker must be recruited manually in the player's base building. Resources have to be transported by workers from their point of origin (such as a goldmine, forest, or farm) to either the base building or a specific storage building, but they do not have to be transported to building sites, to buildings where they are being used for research or manufacturing, or to buildings that are being upgraded.

Both races have their own unique buildings, heroes, soldiers, support troops, and special abilities. For example, the Spartan headquarters is the Acropolis and the Macedonian is the Megaron. Each of their economic models is also slightly different. For example, the Spartans require specific storage for all three resources, whereas the Macedonians require storage for only food and wood.

=== Combat ===
Screenshot of Fate of Hellas showing a small battle between Persians (blue) and Spartans (red). Note the graphical similarity to Fate of Hellas's predecessor - Ancient Wars: Sparta.

All soldiers are recruited at either a barracks or a shooting range. The game features three basic types of soldier; Light (Psiloi for the Spartans; Sarissaphoros for the Macedonians), Medium (Spartiate for the Spartans; Hetairoi for the Macedonians), and Heavy (Hoplites for both races). These are base units only, and the player is free to create melee warriors and archers from all three types of unit, using a variety of equipment and armour combinations. Each unit has three slots for customization, with the player free to choose from a primary weapon, secondary weapon and, depending on the primary and secondary weapon, a shield. So, for example, a player may equip some Hoplites with a sword and shield, some with a bow, some with both a sword and a bow (which weapon is their primary weapon is dictated by where they were trained, barracks or shooting range), and some with a sword, shield, and bow. Players can order soldiers equipped with more than one weapon to switch weapons at any time.

Initially, the player is restricted to the base unit's default equipment, but once research has begun, more weapons and armour become available. Once researched, all items have to be manufactured. Each process (research and manufacture) costs resources and takes time, and once a piece of equipment has been researched and manufactured, the player can equip it to any unit. Both research and manufacture are one-time procedures and are not required every time the player equips that particular piece. However, producing a unit of any kind also costs resources, and the more advanced the equipment, the more expensive the unit and the longer the training. An alternative way to equip soldiers is to have workers collect the equipment of defeated enemies. This equipment can then be used by the player to equip their own army at no cost, and with no research or manufacture time.

When the player's units see enemies, they react automatically, depending on which stance the player has selected from the four available; "Aggressive" (attack enemies as soon as they come within range, and pursue fleeing enemies indefinitely), "Defensive" (attack enemies as soon as they come within range, but only pursue them a short distance), "Hold the ground" (units defend their position and do not pursue the enemy), and "Passive" (units do not attack the enemy unless they are attacked first). As well as these four stances, the player also has three formations from which to choose: line, column, and free formation.

Heroes are also an important element of combat. They have more health points and are stronger than normal units, and they can acquire special abilities when they level up. In some missions, if the player's hero dies, the mission is immediately over. Players also have access to support units - for the Spartans there are Mysteries (can heal individual troops and see through the fog of war) and Flautists (can raise troop morale, making them stronger in battle), and for the Macedonians there are Mysteries and Magians (can temporarily control enemy troops and create a circle of fire around allied troops).

Another element of combat is the use of war machines, with both races using chariots, battle chariots, siege towers, and catapults. War machines must be researched before they can be manufactured, and once built, they require either workers or soldiers to operate them. As with equipment, the player can commandeer the opponents' war machines. The game also features naval combat, with three different types of ship available: light battleships (Biremes), heavy battleships (Triremes), and barges, which are defenceless and are used to transport large groups of soldiers and equipment. As with equipment and war machines, the player can commandeer the opponents' ships. There are also horses available for both races. As with equipment, war machines, and ships, the player can commandeer the opponents' animals.

== Plot ==
=== The Spartan campaign ===
The campaign begins in 396 BC. Agesilaus II has been king of Sparta for two years and is presiding over a period of increased aggression. Having already taken control of Ephesus, and with his mind bent on Spartan hegemony over all of the Peloponnese, Agesilaus turns his attention to Elis. Offering protection, friendship, and trade, in return for subservience, he is infuriated when the city resists Spartan rule. He acknowledges that he has no desire to wage war on his fellow Greeks, but, nevertheless, he refuses to allow his authority to be rebuked in such a manner. Accompanied by his senior-most general, Cleombrotus, Agesilaus defeats Elis and then focuses on Heraclea Trachinia, which also resists Spartan hegemony, much to his ongoing bewilderment.

Upon successfully conquering Heraclea, Agesilaus heads to Asia Minor to begin liberating Greek states from Persian control. Having successfully defeated the Persians in several small battles, the Spartans then head to Sardis, home of the Persian king, Darius II. They attack and capture the city.

Returning to Greece, Agesilaus is shocked to find the Athenians have allied with Thebes, Corinth, and Argos against the Spartans, with the alliance backed by the remnants of the Achaemenid Empire. At the Battle of Nemea, the Spartans defeat the Athenians. They then turn their attention to the Thebans and are victorious at the Battle of Coronea. However, as Agesilaus celebrates, he is approached by a soldier who informs him that although they have won, the army has been decimated. Agesilaus vows to continue the policy of Spartan aggression, stating that if he must, he will enlist women, children, and the elderly, but Cleombrotus reminds him that the Spartan treasury is empty. As Agesilaus rages, Cleombrotus points out that Sparta's time as the most dominant power in the Eastern Mediterranean may have reached its natural conclusion.

=== The Macedonian campaign ===
It is 336 BC. As Celombrotus predicted, Spartan dominance has waned, as has the influence of the Achaemenid Empire, which is now ruled by Darius III. Two years before the game begins, King Philip II of Macedon invaded Greece and defeated an Athenian and Theban army at the Battle of Chaeronea. Compelling the majority of the Greek city-states to join the League of Corinth, Philip next invaded Persia, appointing his eighteen-year-old son Alexander as his senior-most general. However, Philip died early in the campaign, and Alexander was forced to assume power, even at his young age.

Most of Persia surrendered quickly, but a few cities resist, one of which is Miletus. At the Siege of Miletus, Alexander successfully conquers the city. He next heads to Issus, where Darius has amassed a huge army. At the Battle of Issus, Alexander is again victorious and begins to move through Persian territory, capturing whatever cities don't surrender. However, Philotas, commander of the Companion cavalry, is accused of conspiring against Alexander and is put to death. This enrages his father, Parmenion, Alexander's senior-most advisor. In retaliation for the death of his son, Parmenion kidnaps Alexander and imprisons him in a Persian stronghold. However, Alexander is able to escape, returning to the stronghold with his army, and putting Parmenion to death.

Alexander next heads to Egypt. Seeing him as their salvation from Persian occupation, the people welcome him, and in 332, he is officially recognised as Pharaoh. Shortly thereafter, a small rebellion against Macedonian rule begins, led by Khabbabash, a former slave. Unwilling to tolerate any resistance, Alexander defeats and kills Khabbabash, learning that the real organiser of the rebellion is Cambyses, the former Persian satrap of Egypt. At Avaris, Alexander defeats Cambyses, and subsequently presides over victory after victory. Eventually, he reaches India. Throughout the land, rajas submit, until the only place west of the Ganges not under Alexander's control is Cathai. Traditionally a fractured tribalist region, with the arrival of Alexander, the various factions in Cathai unite under the leadership of Taxiles. At the Battle of the Hydaspes in 326, Alexander is once again victorious, defeating the Cathai resistance, and completing his conquest of the known world.

However, only three years later, he would die and his vast empire would splinter and collapse, although his legacy would live forever. As the face of the Mediterranean changes, the balance of power in the region shifts once again, just as it had done when the Spartans gave way to the Macedonians. This time, the dominant power comes from the west - Rome.

== Reception ==
Reception

Aggregate score
Aggregator	Score
Metacritic	52/100

Review scores
Publication	Score
GameSpot	5.5/10
GamesRadar+	2.5/5
IGN	6/10
2404.org	6.5/10
GamingExcellence	4.6/10

The game received mainly negative reviews, with an aggregate score of 52 out of 100 on Metacritic, based on eleven reviews.

2404.org's Björn Holine scored it 6.5 out of 10, finding it "terribly generic" and "indistinguishable from the first instalment." He was especially critical of the LAN-only multiplayer, the AI, and the pathfinding, particularly the pathfinding for ships, which he called "wretched". He concluded by citing "average gameplay, average storyline, average graphics, average sound...you get the picture."

IGN's Steve Butts scored it 6 out of 10. He too was critical of the pathfinding, which he referred to as "downright atrocious", with managing ships feeling like "an exercise in frustration." He was also critical of the lack of tactics during combat. He was impressed with the graphics, writing "the units look great up close and from afar, and their animations are realistic and dynamic," but he concluded, "the pathing problems and the lack of excitement at the tactical level don't provide a strong enough framework for the good parts of the game to really shine through."

GameSpot's Brett Todd scored it 5.5 out of 10. He too was critical of the AI and LAN-only multiplayer, calling the game "a paint-by-numbers production in every way", "formulaic", and "simplistic". Of the lack of combat tactics, he wrote, "all you ever have to do on a map is churn out troops as quickly as possible and hurl them at the enemy base." He was also unimpressed with the graphics, citing "flickering, artifacting, a shudder effect that makes the whole screen seem to shimmer, and no support for widescreen."

GamesRadar+'s Jim Rossignol scored it 2.5 out of 5, calling it "ponderously predictable" and "below the standard we can recommend." He compared it unfavourably to Warcraft III: Reign of Chaos.

GamingExcellence's Nicholas Bale scored it 4.6 out of 10, criticising the LAN-only multiplayer and finding it an "extremely basic, paint-by-the-numbers RTS that seems more like a title from a decade ago." He concluded, "Great War Nations: The Spartans is just such a generic game that it's hard to recommend at all. Even the parts that do stand out don't perform well."
