= Kreed (video game) =

2003 video game

- Developer: Burut Creative Team
- Publisher: Russobit-M
- Engine: X-Tend
- Platform: Microsoft Windows
- Release: August 29, 2003
- Genre: First-person shooter
- Modes: Single-player, multiplayer

Kreed is a sci-fi first-person shooter video game developed by Burut Creative Team and published by Russobit-M in 2003. It takes place in the distant future in the 30th century. The player controls an unnamed space marine trying to stop a cult of religious fanatics trying to get access to a strange cross-dimensional anomaly known as The Kreed. A standalone expansion pack for the game titled Kreed: Battle for Savitar was released in 2004.

== Gameplay ==
Kreed is a fairly standard first-person shooter game from the era. It has a heavy emphasis on world building and exploration à la games like Half-Life 2 or Doom 3. The plot of the game is presented in the form of in-game cutscenes as well as messages the player can read off of computer terminals. The player has access to nine different types of weapons. Some of these weapons include three-barreled shotguns, flamethrowers and chainguns. In combat, enemies will try to work as a team and swarm and flank the player. They are attracted by the sound of gunfire and other similar sounds as well.

== Plot ==
Set in the year 2944, humanity is caught in an interstellar war with an alien species known as the Tiglaary. A strange spatial anomaly known as the Kreed has been deeply puzzling scientists for quite some time. Many people believe the anomaly has great spiritual and religious significance (with some believing it to be a gateway to communicating to higher beings). A group of religious fanatics underneath an ex-military commander by the name of Teofrast Rumi are attempting to breach into the Kreed. Daniel, the player character, is sent to the Kreed to stop them.

== Reception ==
The game received generally mixed reviews upon release, and has an average score of 54 on Russian review aggregate platform Kritikanstvo. Stepan Chechulin of Igromania gave the game a score of 70%, Konstantin Inin of Land of Games gave it a score of 7.5.
