= The Golden Horde (video game) =

2008 video game

- Developer: World Forge
- Publishers: RU: Russobit-M; EU: JoWooD; NA: DreamCatcher Interactive; AU: n3vrf41l Publishing
- Director: Oleg Lychany
- Producer: Vladimir Nikolaev
- Designer: Alexey Yanin
- Programmer: Oleg Lychany
- Artist: Mikhail Babenko
- Writers: Alexey Yanin; Roman Bataev; Andrei Berezhnoi
- Composer: Dynamedion
- Platform: Windows
- Release: RU: February 1, 2008; EU: March 28, 2008; NA: July 15, 2008; AU: September 19, 2008
- Genre: Real-time strategy
- Modes: Single-player, multiplayer

The Golden Horde (Note: Russian: Золотая Орда, romanized: Zolotaya Orda) (released as Great War Nations: The Mongols in some territories) is a 2008 real-time strategy video game for Windows. Developed by World Forge, it was published in Russia by Russobit-M in February 2008, in Europe by JoWooD in March, in North America by DreamCatcher Interactive in July, and in Australia by n3vrf41l Publishing in September. A spiritual successor to Ancient Wars: Sparta and Fate of Hellas, Golden Horde uses the same game engine as the previous titles – the Ancient Wars Engine (AWE) – and features similar gameplay. One more World Forge game using this engine and gameplay style would follow – Age of Alexander.

Set in Russia and Eastern Europe during the Mongol invasion (1237–1242), the game features three playable races – Mongols, Russians, and Crusaders – each of whom has their own campaign, which occasionally overlaps with the other two. The campaigns feature fictional depictions of historical figures such as Batu Khan, Burundai, Jebei, Subutai, Yuri Ingvarevich, Yuri Vsevolodovich, Evpaty Kolovrat, Alexander Yaroslavich, Birger Magnusson, and Herman von Salza, and depict such events as the fall of Ryazan, the Battle of the Sit River, the Siege of Kolomna, the Battle of the Neva, and the Battle on the Ice.

The Golden Horde received mainly negative reviews. Although some critics lauded the ability for the player to arm their soldiers with opponents' discarded weaponry, the majority were unimpressed with the AI, pathfinding, and LAN-only multiplayer. The game's slow pace was singled out by many as especially problematic.

== Gameplay ==
The Golden Horde is a real-time strategy game, controlled via a point and click interface, in which the primary goal on most maps is to build a strong enough army to defeat the opponent or opponents by destroying their settlement, or, on occasion, occupying a specific building on the map. To achieve this end, the player must engage in some basic economic micromanagement, such as gathering resources and constructing buildings.

=== Game modes ===
The game can be played in one of two modes; single-player or multiplayer. In single-player mode, the player can play either campaign missions or individual non-campaign games. In campaign mode, the player must complete a series of missions, the goal of many of which is to defeat the computer controlled opponent or opponents by destroying their settlement. Most missions have several primary objectives, which usually must be completed sequentially, and often one or more secondary objectives. Secondary objectives are not necessary to complete the mission, but they do reward the player with troops or resources if completed. The game features thirteen missions (a four-mission campaign for the Mongols, a five-mission campaign for the Russians, and a four-mission campaign for the Crusaders). The campaigns are independent of one another, and can be played in any order. The missions within each campaign, however, are linear, and each mission only becomes available when the previous one has been completed.

In non-campaign single-player and multiplayer modes, the player chooses the map on which to play, and then selects the type of game, choosing from "No other players" (the player plays the mission without any opposition), "AI" (the player competes against only computer-controlled opponents), and "Open" (the player competes against either a combination of computer-controlled and human-controlled opponents, or all human controlled opponents). Multiplayer mode allows for up to six players, or any combination of human players and computer-controlled opponents. Multiplayer games can only be played via a LAN; there is no online multiplayer mode.

=== Settlements and resources ===
Whether playing in single-player or multiplayer mode, each game begins roughly the same way; the player is positioned at a set location on the map, sometimes with a prebuilt base building, and often with a certain number of soldiers and/or workers. The upper population of the player's settlement is determined by the capacity of all villages under the player's control. Each village increases the population cap by ten individual slots, although this process happens gradually rather than all at once. Once available, each slot can be filled by a worker or soldier, depending on the player's actions. If a villager dies, his slot will be made available again after a set time has passed. Workers are required to construct buildings and gather wood. They also occupy and perform the requisite tasks of each building. Workers can be directly controlled by the player and can be ordered to repair buildings and collect enemy weapons.

The game features two types of resources; wood and metal, which are required to construct buildings and manufacture equipment. Wood can be acquired by clearing forests; metal must be mined. To do so, the player must build a metal mine atop a metal deposit. Each deposit has a set amount of metal, and to exhaust the deposit, the player must upgrade the mine. At level one, a mine will yield one-third of the total metal amount; at level two, it will yield two-thirds, and at level three, it will yield 100%. Wood has to be transported by workers from the point of origin to the base building, but they do not have to be transported to building sites, to buildings where they are being used for manufacturing, or to buildings that are being upgraded.

Each of the three races has its own unique buildings, heroes, soldiers, and special abilities. Mongol buildings are mobile, and each building can be disassembled and transported to another location; Russian buildings can only be constructed within a certain distance of the base building; Crusaders' buildings can be built in any location, and are fixed - once built, they cannot be relocated. The Mongol base building is the Khan's House, the Russian is the Tachara, and the Crusaders' is the Acropolis.

=== Combat ===
Screenshot of The Golden Horde showing a small battle taking place on a frozen lake, an important gameplay element - the ice will crack if there is too much movement or weight.

There are three basic types of weapons with which players can equip soldiers - melee weapons such as swords, axes, and clubs, short-ranged weapons such as spears and pikes, and long-ranged weapons such as bows and javelins. Each soldier can carry one weapon plus a shield. Depending on which race the player is using, there are different soldiers available for recruitment. Mongols have one unit type - Aduuchs, who are trained in the Yurt of Warriors. Prior to levelling up, Aduuchs can also be used as workers. Upon levelling up, an Aduuch becomes a specialised unit - a Turgen (swordsman), Nuker (spearman), or Nachin (archer), determined by which weapon he had equipped at the moment he levelled up. Russians also have one unit type - Druzhinniks, who are trained in the Detinets. When initially trained, they do not have a specialisation, which is only acquired when they level up. Like the Mongolians, the nature of their specialisation depends on which weapon they are using at the moment they level up. Crusaders have two unit types - Capitularies and Knights, both of which are trained in the garrison. Knights are stronger, but Capitularies are faster, with Knights better suited to melee combat, and Capitularies to ranged combat. However, players are free to recruit ranged Knights and melee Capitularies. When initially trained, soldiers do not have a specialisation, which is only acquired when they level up. The nature of their specialisation depends on which weapon they are using when they level up.

Initially, the player is restricted to using default equipment, but once the forge is built and the smith starts to earn experience, more weapons and shields become available. At the highest level of experience, the smith can manufacture a banner, only one of which can be used at a time, and which grants all soldiers stat increases. Each race's banner grants different bonuses. Manufacturing each piece of equipment costs resources and takes time, and once a piece of equipment has been manufactured, the player can equip it to any unit. An alternative way to equip soldiers is to have workers collect the equipment of defeated enemies. This equipment can then be used by the player to equip their own army without any manufacturing time. Player's can also take possession of the opponent's banner, which will grant different stat improvements than their own unique banner.

Every time an enemy unit is killed, all player units within a certain range gain experience points, with the unit that performed the fatal hit gaining more experience than other nearby units. When a unit accumulates a certain amount of experience, it levels up, increasing its hit points, defence, and offence. He also gains access to additional special abilities. This is an automatic process; the player has no input into the levelling-up process of normal units. Players do, however, have input in levelling up heroes. Heroes have more health points and are stronger than normal units, and in some missions, if the player's hero dies, the mission is immediately over. When the hero gains a level, the player must manually upgrade his skills, choosing from three categories of skill - Strategic (grants bonuses to all allied troops), Tactical (grants bonuses to all nearby troops), and Combat (grants bonuses to hero unit only).

When the player's units see enemies, they react automatically, depending on which stance the player has selected from the four available; "Aggressive" (attack enemies as soon as they come within range, and pursue fleeing enemies indefinitely), "Defensive" (attack enemies as soon as they come within range, but only pursue them a short distance), "Hold the ground" (units defend their position and do not pursue the enemy), and "Passive" (units do not attack the enemy unless they are attacked first). As well as these four stances, the player also has three formations from which to choose: line, column, and free formation. Weather conditions also play a part in combat. For example, rain slows down all movement, snow decreases visibility and shooting range, ice can break and drown troops, fire can spread from one object to another depending on wind direction and speed. Wind is also important for archers - those shooting downwind get a 10%-30% range increase, depending on the strength of the wind, whilst those shooting upwind get a 10%-30% range decrease.

== Plot ==
=== The Mongolian campaign ===
The campaign begins in 1237. Ögedei Khan is the 2nd Khagan-Emperor of the Mongol Empire, and as part of his plan to conquer Europe, Ögedei has ordered Batu Khan, founder of the Golden Horde, to invade Russia. As the game begins, Batu has led the Horde to the southern edge of Ryazan.

He offers the Grand Duke of Ryazan, Yuri Ingvarevich, a chance to surrender, but Ingvarevich refuses. Along with his generals Burundai, Jebei, and Subutai, Batu successfully leads his army against the city. However, Ingvarevich and some of his soldiers escape, relocating to the forests along the Sit River. Led by Burundai, a force is sent through the forests to take Ingvarevich by surprise. At the Battle of the Sit River, Burundai is successful, wiping out the remains of Ryazan's resistance.

Following the Mongol occupation of Russia, many Cuman-Kipchak tribes fled the country and travelled west. One such tribe was that led by Kotjan Kahn, which headed to Hungary. There, they were offered asylum if they converted to Christianity. They did so and allied themselves with the Hungarian king, Béla IV, vowing to fight the Mongols, who were preparing to invade. However, in 1241, worried that Béla was using the Cumans to solidify his hold on power, Hungarian nobles murdered Kotjan. This infuriated the tribe, who immediately left Hungary, heading towards the Balkans, and destroying every village in their path. En route, they are attacked by a Mongol force led by Subutai, and many are killed, leaving the path open for the Mongols to invade Hungary and continue with the occupation of Europe.

=== The Russian campaign ===
The Russian campaign begins as Ingvarevich receives a letter from Batu demanding that he surrender Ryazan. Ignoring the demand, he begins preparing the city for attack, contacting Yuri Vsevolodovich, Grand Duke of Vladimir, for assistance. However, unwilling to let go of past enmity between Ryazan and Vladimir, Vsevolodovich ignores the pleas for aid. Although initially successful in defending the city, after several weeks of sustained attacks, Ryazan eventually falls.

Towards the end of the siege, a boyar named Evpaty Kolovrat manages to escape with a group of about 1,700 men, and after the city falls, he begins to lead them in attacks on Batu's forces. After the Battle of the Sit River, the Mongols head towards Kolomna and lay siege to the fortress. A week later, they are attacked by a makeshift army composed of Kolovrat's troops, Vsevolodovich's troops (who had now decided to stand against the Mongols), and troops from Novgorod. They put up a valiant fight against the much larger Mongol force, even managing to slay Jebei, but eventually they fall along with Kolomna.

Three years later, Novgorod lookouts spot a Swedish army travelling along the Neva River. When alerted of the impending invasion, Alexander Yaroslavich, Prince of Novgorod, immediately begins to mobilise. Shortly thereafter he receives a letter from Birger Magnusson, a high-ranking Swedish jarl and leader of the invasion. Magnusson taunts Yaroslavich, stating that there is little point in resisting. Irrespective of this, Yaroslavich marches his troops to Izhora. At the Battle of the Neva, Yaroslavich is victorious.

The following year, the Livonian Order, a branch of the Teutonic Knights, occupy Pskov, hoping to exploit Novgorod's weakness in the wake of the Mongol and Swedish invasions, but Yaroslavich successfully liberates the city. Determined to push the Order out of Russia, he marches to Lake Peipus, and in the Battle on the Ice, his troops engage with the Order on the frozen lake. Defeating them, Alexander is able to drive the invaders back, halting their eastward expansion.

=== The Crusader campaign ===
The Crusader campaign begins during the Cuman exodus from Hungary. As the Cumans travel towards the Balkans, destroying any villages they encounter, they cross paths with a group of Teutonic Knights, who immediately send word for help. However, the messenger troop is intercepted and all but two are killed - a cleric and a young knight named Herman von Salza. Determined to complete their mission and carry the message to its destination, the duo manage to sneak out of Hungary and alert the Teutonic Order about what is happening.

Later that year, Pope Gregory IX receives a request to allow displaced Curonians to join the Livonian Order. Believing that uniting the Courland church with the Order will weaken any enemies in the region, Gregory agrees, and places von Salza in charge. Led by von Salza and Magnusson, the Order occupy Izborsk, before setting their sights on and successfully conquering Pskov.

Meanwhile, the Mongol invasion of Europe continues, with much of the Great Steppe now under their rule. Determined to complete the invasion before the beginning of spring, Batu orders Burundai to set up camp along the Oder River. However, having done so, the Mongols inadvertently converge with the troops led by Magnusson. In a series of hit-and-run battles, Magnusson is able to defeat multiple contingents of the Mongol army, slowing down the European invasion.

== Reception ==
Reception

Aggregate score
Aggregator	Score
Metacritic	54/100

Review scores
Publication	Score
GameSpot	6/10
IGN	5.8/10
PC Zone	36/100
GameWatcher	6.8/10

The game received predominately negative reviews, with an aggregate score of 54 out of 100 on Metacritic, based on seven reviews.

GameWatcher's Simon Priest scored it 6.8 out of 10, acknowledging that "it probably won't be to everyone's taste." Although he found it to be "a pleasant shake up to the usual tried and true method of an RTS game", he also felt that "nothing here is going to blow you away".

GameSpot's Brett Todd scored it 6 out of 10, calling it "just about as mediocre as the developer's last effort.! He was critical of the "tedious micromanagement and sluggish paint-by-numbers real-time strategy gameplay", as well as how the story was presented, arguing that the game provides little context to any of the missions. He was also critical of "the sluggish pace" and the "plodding, dull" missions. Although he praised the variety of objectives within each mission, and argued that the AI was improved upon since the previous game, he concluded, "everything about this RTS is a blend of been-there, done-that formula."

IGN's Steve Butts scored it 5.8 out of 10. He was unimpressed with the "agonisingly slow pace", the AI (which "seems to rely too heavily on specific, limited triggers and exploitable scripted behaviour"), and the pathfinding. Although he praised the ability to equip units with enemies' weapons, he concluded "if you're absolutely chomping at the bit to get your hands on an RTS that lets you fight as Medieval Russians and Mongols, you don't have too many other options, but there's not much else here to recommend."

PC Zone's Ed Zitron scored it 36 out of 100, writing "its got everything you could possibly expect from a middling RTS but is hindered by wonky concepts." He was especially critical of the AI, pathfinding, and pace. He concluded, "the middling graphics, the hilariously bad voice acting, and AI that's erratic enough to sever any immersion you might be feeling all combine to make The Golden Horde patently unrecommendable."
