= Specnaz: Project Wolf =

2006 video game

- Developer: Byte Software
- Publisher: GMX Media
- Platform: Microsoft Windows
- Release: 30 June 2006
- Genre: Tactical first-person shooter
- Mode: Single player

Specnaz: Project Wolf is a 2006 first person shooter developed by Slovak studio Byte Software for Microsoft Windows and published by GMX Media on 30 June 2006. The player controls a team of Russian Spetsnaz as they try to retrieve a stolen nuclear weapon.

== Gameplay ==
Specnaz is a tactical first person shooter reminiscent of titles such as Delta Force and Project I.G.I.. The game can be played only in single player. Players can choose solo or team missions. On a team, players lead a group of soldiers and can give them orders, while playing solo means that players have no teammates. Missions are set in Iran, Yemen, Afghanistan, Uzbekistan and Burma. Players must complete tasks such as setting explosives to destroy a target object or retrieving secret documents.

== Plot ==
The game is set in the near future. Terrorists have stolen nuclear weapons and Russia tries to retrieve them back.

== Sequel ==
A sequel was announced in 2006 prior to release of the game. Specnaz 2 was also developed by Byte Software for Microsoft Windows and published by Russobit-M and CI Games on 1 January 2009.
