= Russobit-M =

Russian video game distributor

Russobit-M was a distributor of PC games in Russia and the CIS. It was crucial in PC game distribution in the Post-Soviet states. In 2003, it partnered with GFI to release game software and DVDs throughout Russia.

Russobit-M was established in 1997 and soon became the major publisher and distributor in the Russian and CIS game markets. The company employed more than two hundred gaming specialists and more than a hundred international partners at its peak. By the time the company stopped operating, it had sold one million CD/DVDs on the local market.

In 2003, the company combined efforts with GFI. GFI acted as the publisher and developer and Russobit-M functioned as a distributor. In May 2008, Russobit-M and GFI merged to establish the Bestway Group.

In October 2008, Play Ten Interactive became incorporated into the group. The games of the company are selling on game platforms these days.

The company released 900 projects, including 100 developed by Russian companies. Russobit-M ceased operations on 15 April 2013.

== Games published ==
- W.A.R Soldiers
- The Precursors
- White Gold
- Kreed
- Neuro
- Ancient Wars: Sparta
- Fate of Hellas
- The Golden Horde
- Homeplanet
- TMNT
- Claw
- Worms: Armageddon
- Cultures 2: The Gates of Asgard
- Nuclear Titbit: Flashback
- Brothers
- Specnaz 2
- M.I.A.: Mission in Asia
- Tom and Jerry in Fists of Furry
