= Anysis =

Anysis was a king of Egypt, mentioned only in book II of Histories by Herodotus. Herodotus says he came from a city after which he was named. He was blind and was deposed by Aethiopians led by Sabacos. After fifty years of hiding in marshland on the island Elbo, he came back into power.

According to Herodotus, Anysis created the island from the marsh "by heaping up ashes and earth: for whenever any of the Egyptians visited him bringing food, according as it had been appointed to them severally to do without the knowledge of the Ethiopian, he bade them bring also some ashes for their gift."
