= M.I.A.: Mission in Asia =

2009 video game

- Developer: Burut Creative Team
- Publishers: NA: Game Factory Interactive; CIS: Russobit-M
- Director: Alexander Borodetskiy
- Producers: Vladimir Nikolaev; Alexey Pastushkov
- Designers: Alexander Severinov; Denis Malakhanov
- Programmer: Alexander Borodetskiy
- Writer: Alexander Borodetskiy
- Composer: Roman Reva
- Engine: X-Tend
- Platform: Microsoft Windows
- Release: CIS: 25 September 2009; NA: 27 March 2011
- Genre: First-person shooter
- Mode: Single-player

M.I.A.: Mission in Asia (known as Peacemaker in Russia) is a 2009 first-person shooter video game developed by Russian developer Burut Creative Team and published by Game Factory Interactive and Russobit-M. Set in the year 2007 in the fictional Eastern European countries of Primoria and Slavia, the game tells the story of a Russian soldier tasked with tracking down a Primorian who was caught working as an undercover spy within Russia who has since fled to Slavia.

== Plot ==
Tensions are growing on the border between Slavia and Primoria. After the Russian FSS received information seeming to indicate that one of the FSS's agents had been recruited by Primoria, it's soon decided by the Russian FSS that this spy must be arrested as soon as possible. Before this spy could be arrested however, they managed to escape to Slavia. In order not to exacerbate already harsh tensions between Slavia and Primoria, the Russian FSS has decided to try and send a special FSS agent into Slavia secretly in order to take out this spy for good.

== Reception ==
The game received mixed to generally poor reviews upon release. The game received an average score of 2.5 on StopGame.ru.
