= Elbo =

Elbo was, according to Herodotus' Histories, a man-made island of ash and earth where the blind Egyptian king Anysis lived during his 50 years of exile while the Ethiopian king Sabacos ruled Egypt. Supposedly, the island was built up because Egyptians who were bringing food to Anysis were also told to bring him ashes as a gift. Elbo and Anysis are unknown except outside of Herodotus, but Sabacos may refer to Shabaka, a Kushite pharaoh of Egypt's Twenty-fifth Dynasty. As Heroditus states in Book II of his Histories:

140. Then when the Ethiopian had gone away out of Egypt, the blind man came back from the fen-country and began to rule again, having lived there during fifty years upon an island which he had made by heaping up ashes and earth: for whenever any of the Egyptians visited him bringing food, according as it had been appointed to them severally to do without the knowledge of the Ethiopian, he bade them bring also some ashes for their gift. 123ii This island none was able to find before Amyrtaios; that is, for more than seven hundred years 124ii the kings who arose before Amyrtaios were not able to find it. Now the name of this island is Elbo, and its size is ten furlongs each way.
