= Neuro (video game) =

2006 video game

- Developer: Revolt Games
- Publisher: Russobit-M
- Platform: Microsoft Windows
- Release: RUS: 10 March 2006
- Genre: First-person shooter
- Mode: Single-player

Neuro is a cyberpunk first-person shooter video game developed by Revolt Games and published by Russobit-M. It was released on 10 March 2006 for Microsoft Windows.

The game's plot and world is tech-noir and cyberpunk-themed, as well as dystopian, with inspiration drawn from Blade Runner and Akira, and the works of writers such as William Gibson and Philip K. Dick.

== Plot ==
Neuro is a low-key crime drama with a cyberpunk theme and backdrop that philosophizes on the devolution of humankind: Even though humans have spread themselves out amongst the stars and developed technology to improve and enrich their lives, they are still likely to exploit each other whenever possible. James Gravesen is a law officer who is attempting to arrest an elusive smuggler with government connections, Ramone, who is dealing in "Lilac Death," a highly dangerous weaponized substance that can "wipe out Sorgo three times". James has biotechnology implanted in his brain that gives him a handful of psi-weapons: From 30 feet away and only using his mind, he can light enemies on fire, blow them off their feet and crush them, and make them go berserk and kill their allies. He can also see through walls to identify where enemies lurk, and he can heal himself. All of this takes a psi-energy which depletes with each use but resets over time. The enemies are mostly crooks trying to stop you from completing your various missions.

== History ==
Neuro had been in development since 2002 and was demonstrated at E3s 2003 and 2004. While intended for worldwide release, it was only released in Russia, the CIS (dubbed into Russian) and Taiwan (dubbed into English). In 2010, an academic, Keith Duffy, found out about the game and, unaware of the official English-language release in Taiwan, translated it into English using Google Translate. His translation was released for free on his blog.

The Taiwanese release features a GFI Russia logo in the intro despite being distributed by Miracle Express, probably indicating that GFI would have been responsible for European and other Western distribution of the game.

The game was released on Steam on 11 October 2024, featuring both the English and Russian versions.
