= Tachara =

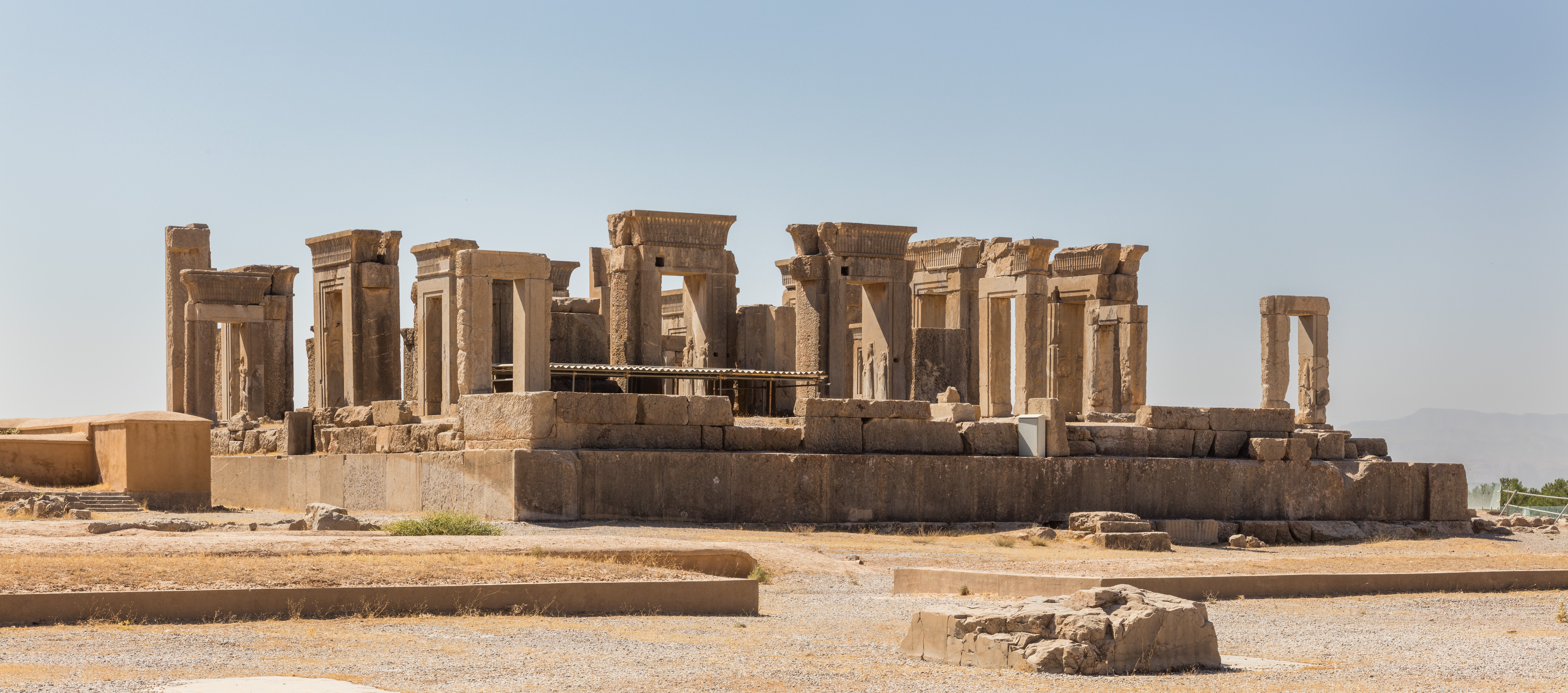
- Ruins of the Tachara, Persepolis.
- Interactive map of the Tachara area

General information
- Status: in ruins
- Architectural style: Achaemenid architecture
- Location: Persepolis; Marvdasht, Fars province, Iran
- Coordinates: 29.9344°N 52.88955°E

Technical details
- Material: stone

Website
- UNESCO: Persepolis

The Tachara, or the Tachar Château, also referred to as the Palace of Darius the Great, was the exclusive building of Darius I at Persepolis, Iran. It is located 70 km northeast of the modern city of Shiraz in Fars province.

== History and construction ==
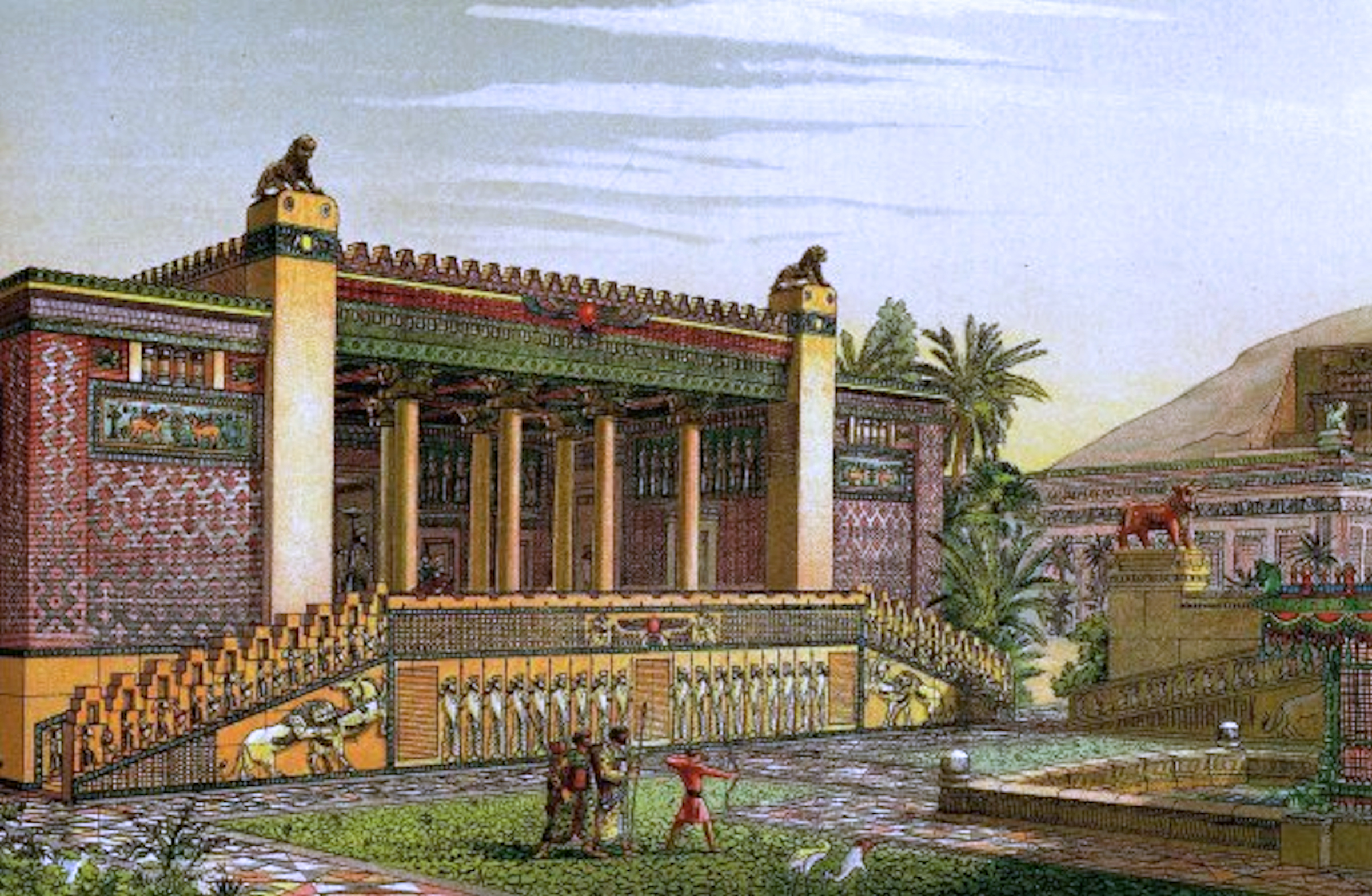
The exterior of the Tachara and its surrounding gardens, as depicted by Charles Chipiez.

The construction dates back to the time of the Achaemenid Empire (550 BC–330 BC). The building has been attributed to Darius I, but only a small portion of it was finished under his rule. It was completed after the death of Darius I in 486, by his son and successor, Xerxes I, who called it a taçara in Old Persian, translated to "winter palace".

In the 4th century BC, following his invasion of Achaemenid Persia in 330 BC, Alexander the Great allowed his troops to loot Persepolis. This palace was one of the few structures that escaped destruction in the burning of the complex by Alexander the Great's army.

== Structure ==
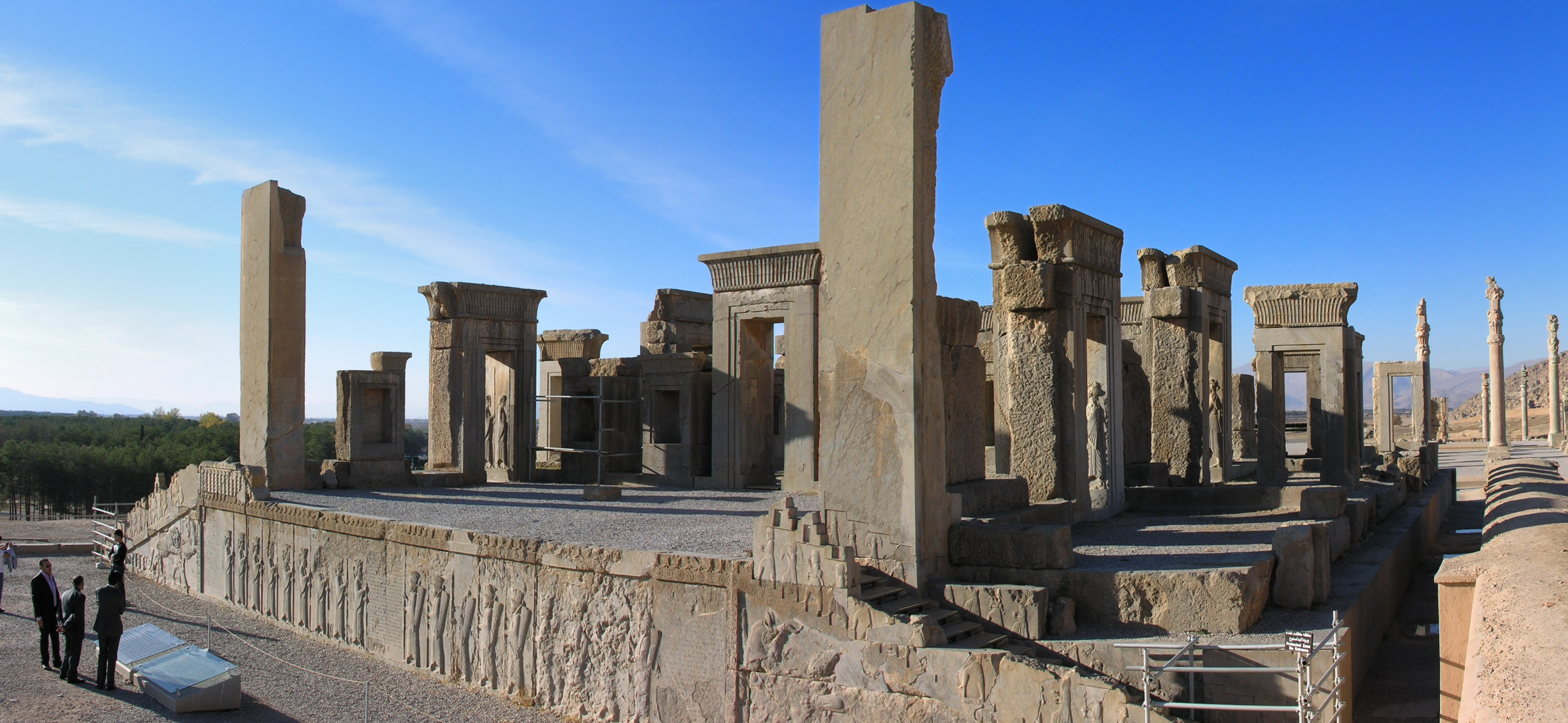
Ruins of the Tachara, Persepolis.

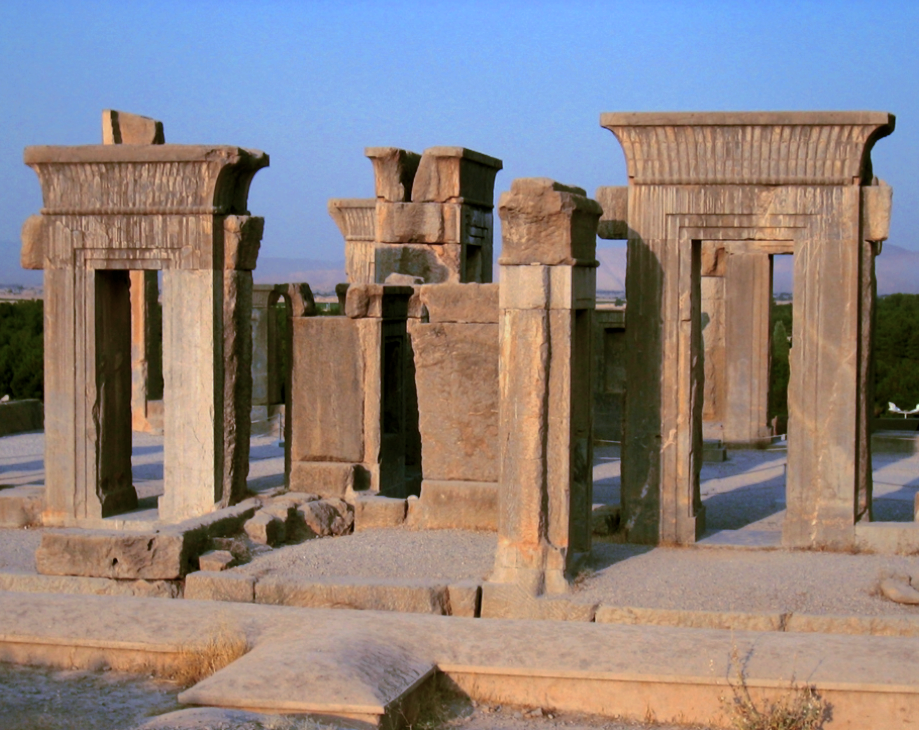
Tachara palace.

The Tachara stands back to back to the Apadana, and is oriented southward. Measuring 1,160 square meters (12,500 square feet), it is the smallest of the palace buildings on the Terrace at Persepolis.

As the oldest of the palace structures on the Terrace, it was constructed of the finest quality gray stone.

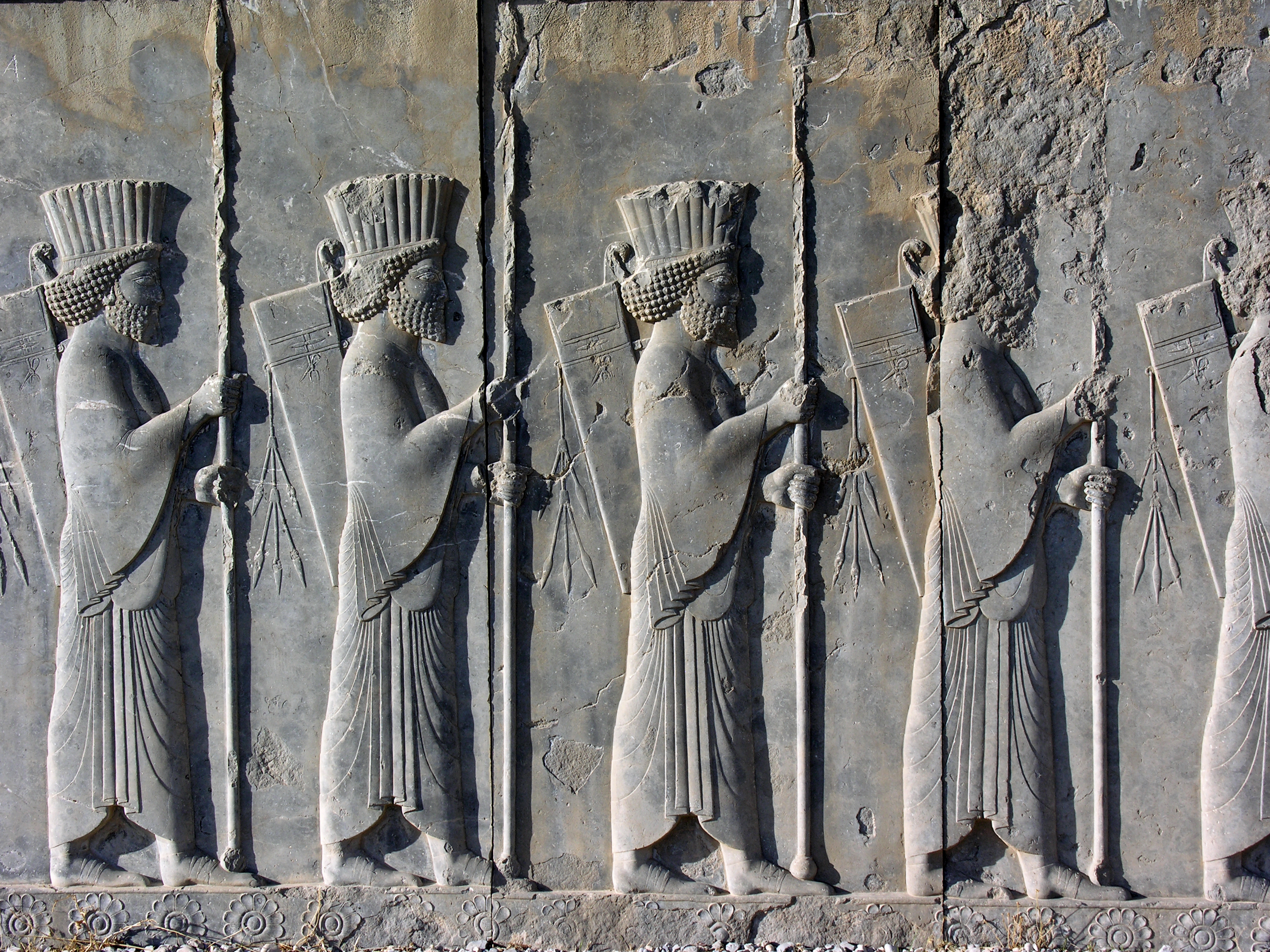
Bas-reliefs from the Tachara.

Its main room is a mere 15.15 m × 15.42 m (49.7 ft × 50.6 ft) with three rows of four columns. A complete window measuring 2.65 m × 2.65 m × 1.70 m (8.7 ft × 8.7 ft × 5.6 ft) was carved from a single block of stone and weighed 18 tons. The door frame was fashioned from three separate monoliths and weighed 75 tons.

Like many other parts of Persepolis, the Tachara has reliefs of tribute-bearing dignitaries. There are sculptured figures of lance-bearers carrying large rectangular wicker shields, attendants or servants with towel and perfume bottles, and a royal hero killing lions and monsters. There is also a bas-relief at the main doorway depicting Darius I wearing a crenellated crown covered with sheets of gold.

The Tachara is connected to the south court by a double reversed stairway. Later under the reign of Artaxerxes III, a new stairway was added to the northwest of the Tachara which is connected to the main hall through a new doorway. On walls of these stairways, there are sculptured representations of figures such as servants, attendants and soldiers dressed in Median and Persian costumes, as well as gift-bearing delegations flanking carved inscriptions.

== Function ==
The function of the building, however, was more ceremonial than residential.

== Gallery ==
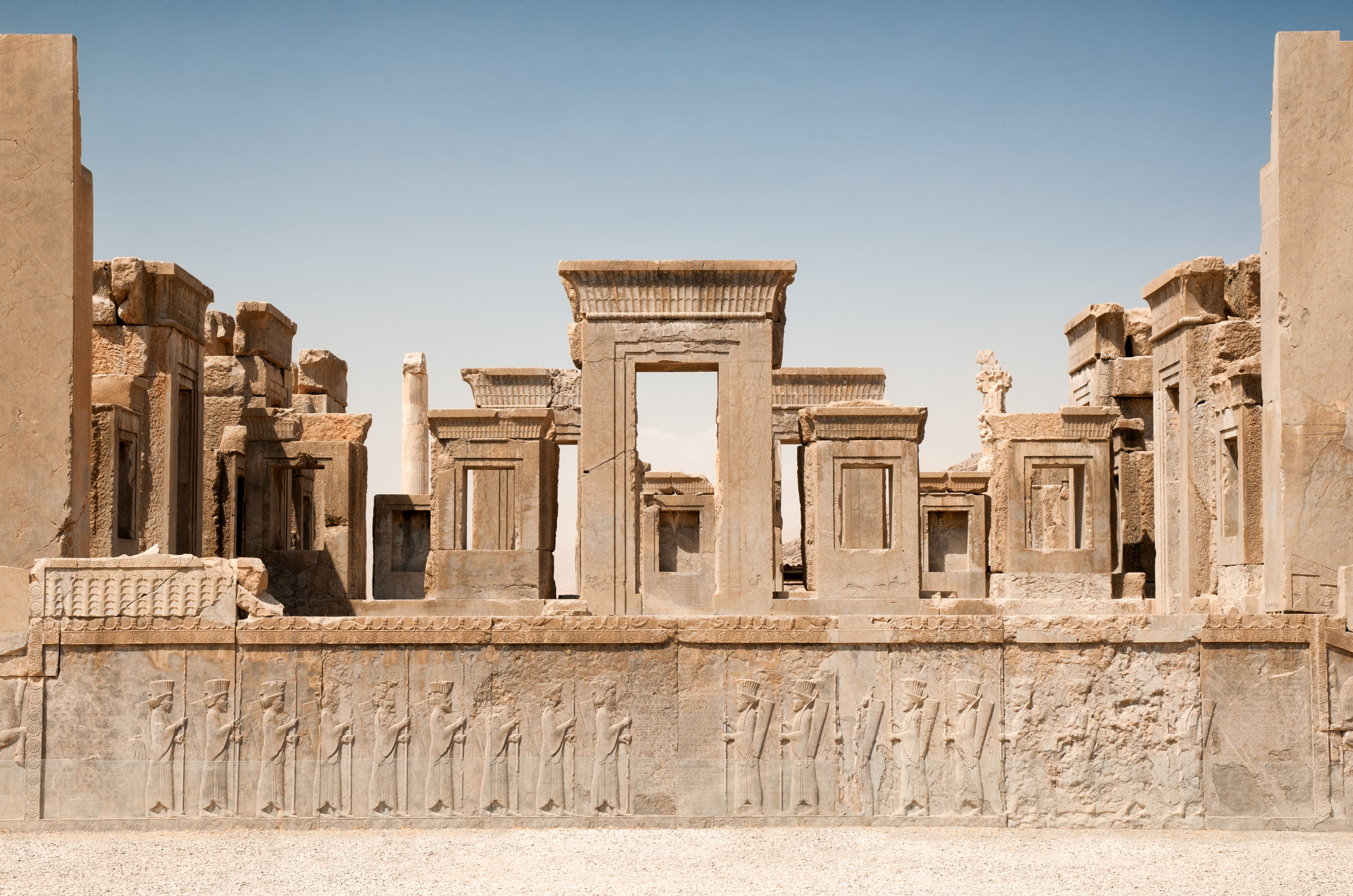

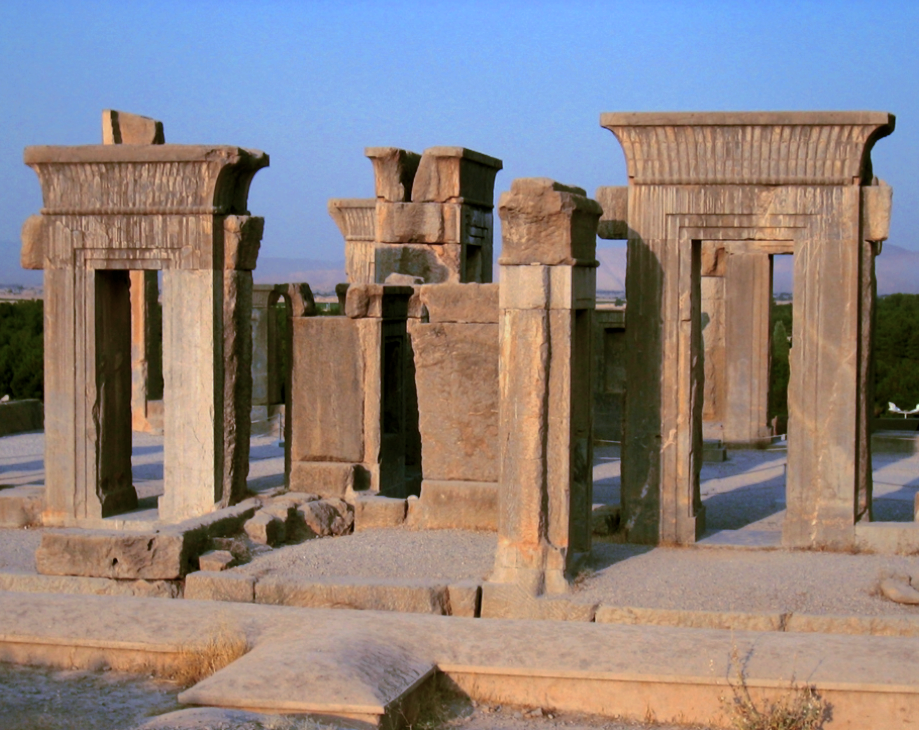

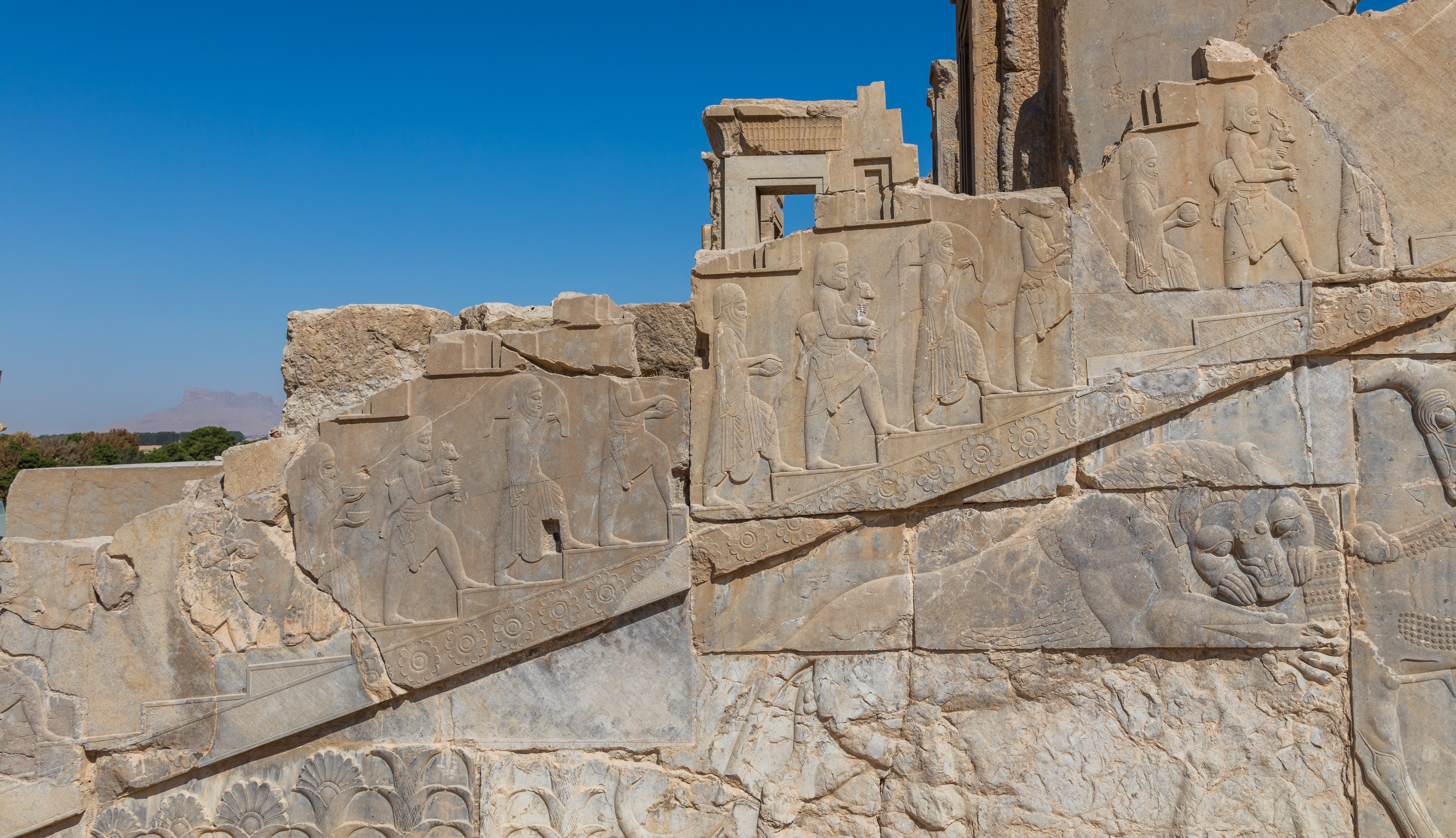

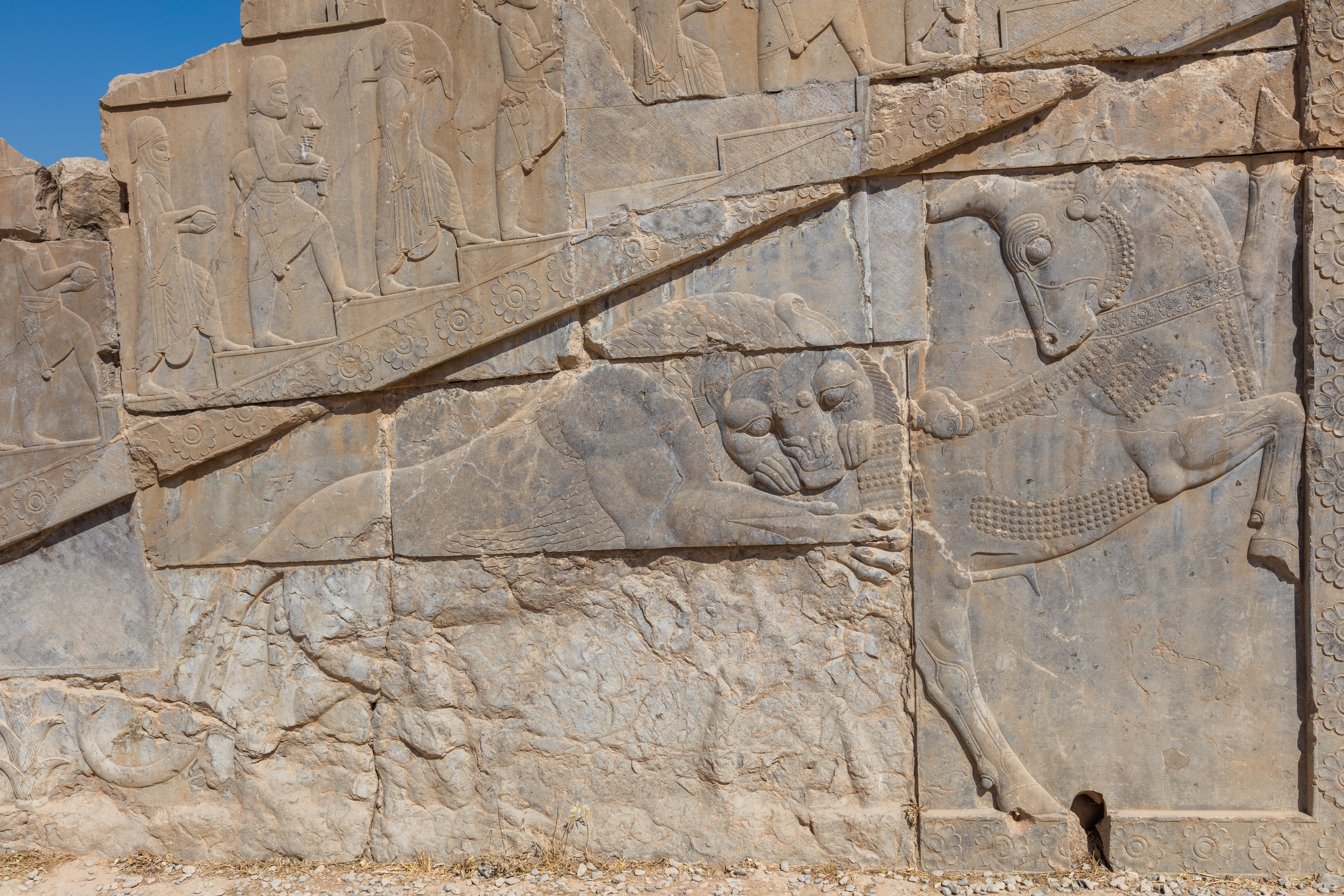

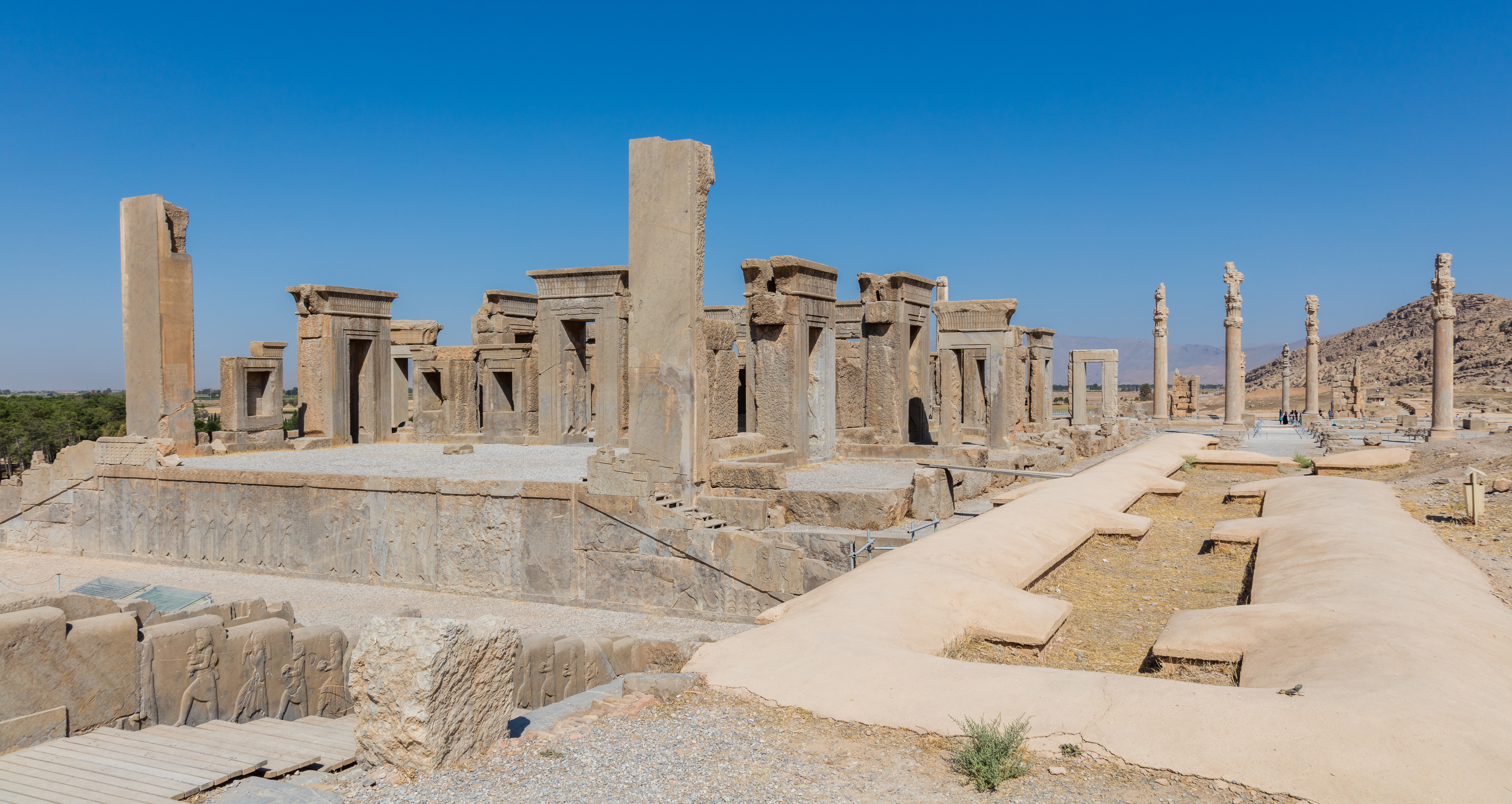

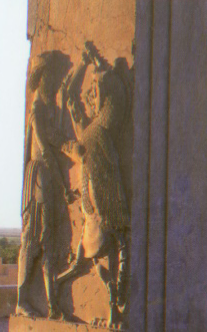
Carving of the Battle of Shahriar and Lion on the wall of a gate.

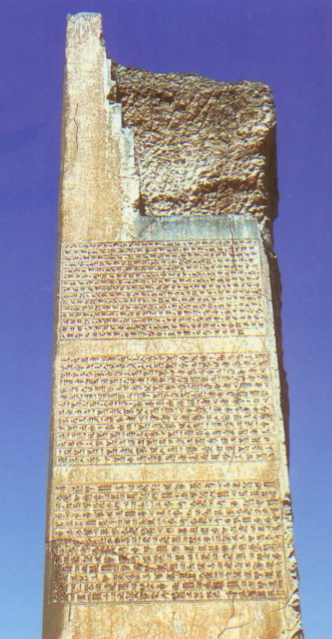

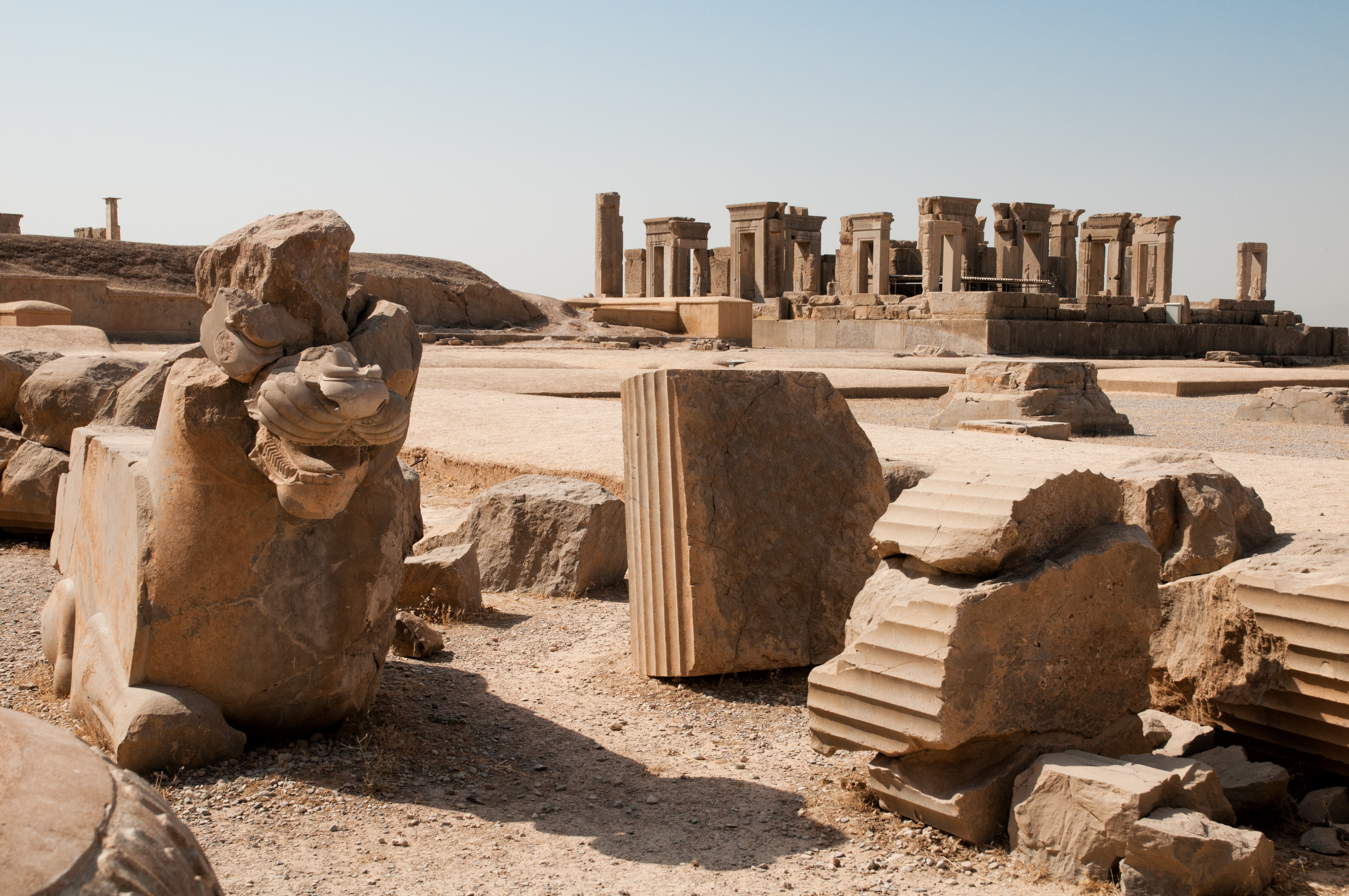

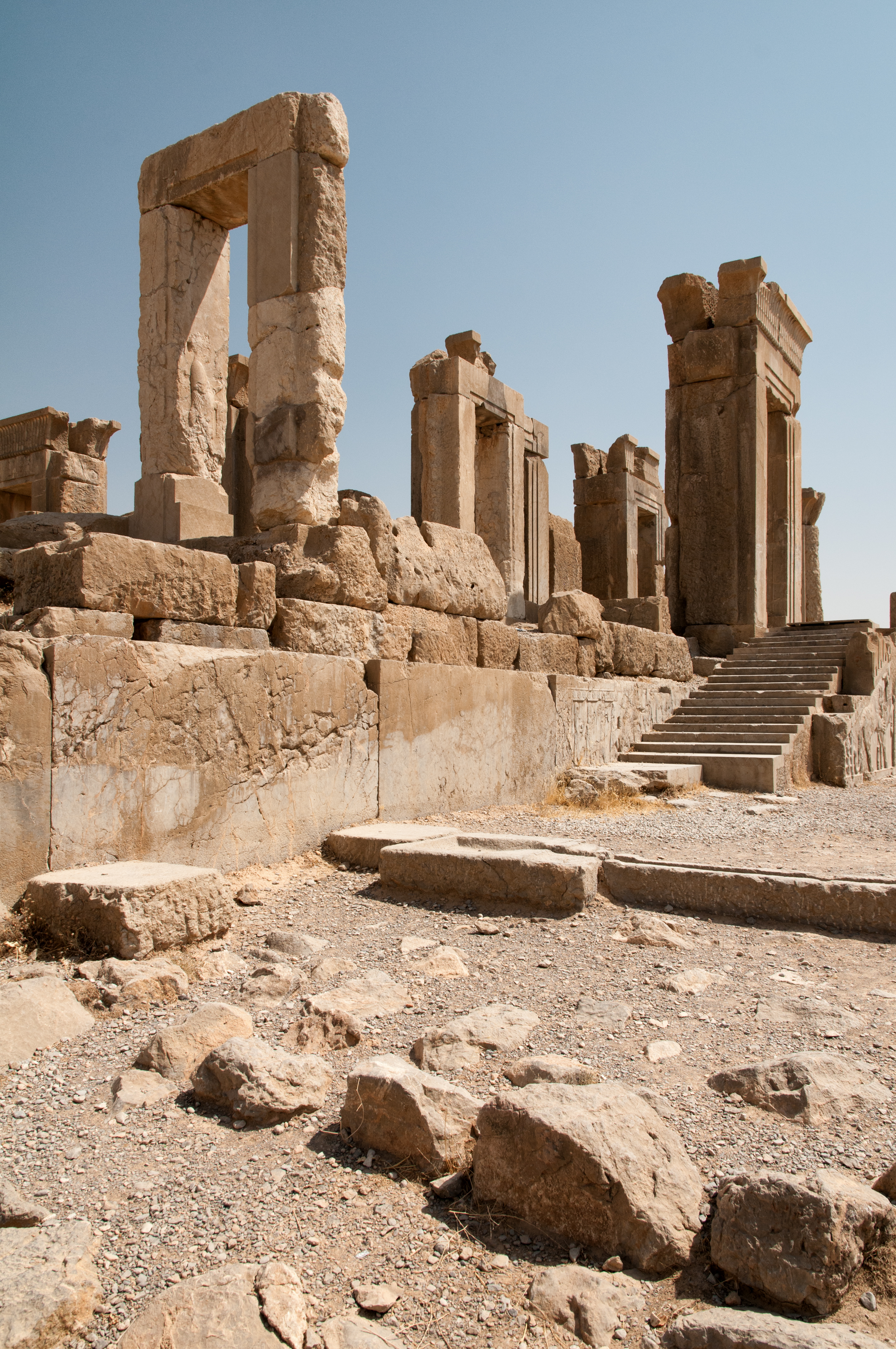

== See also ==
- Apadana
- Persepolis
- Achaemenid architecture
