= Commander Keen (video game) =

2001 video game

- North American box art
- Developer: David A. Palmer Productions
- Publisher: Activision
- Designer: David Palmer
- Artist: Jim Meston
- Composer: Mark Cooksey
- Series: Commander Keen
- Platform: Game Boy Color
- Release: NA: May 29, 2001; PAL: June 15, 2001
- Genre: Platform
- Mode: Single-player

Commander Keen is a 2001 platform video game developed by David A. Palmer Productions and published by Activision for the Game Boy Color. Part of the Commander Keen series, it was released ten years after the first seven episodes in 1990–91. The game follows the titular Commander Keen, an eight-year-old child genius, as he journeys through three alien worlds to collect three plasma crystals to prevent the weapon they power, built by several enemies from previous games, from destroying the universe. The game features Keen running, jumping, and shooting through various levels while opposed by aliens, robots, and other hazards.

The original games of the Commander Keen series were developed by id Software, but after the success of their 3D first-person shooters such as Wolfenstein 3D (1992) and Doom (1993), they canceled the planned future episodes in the series. In 1999, founder John Carmack remarked that he was considering making a Game Boy Color game for the series, and sometime afterwards id approached Activision with the idea. Activision recommended David A. Palmer Productions to develop the game, as they had been proposing to make Game Boy Color versions of id's other games, and Palmer proceeded to make the game with oversight from id.

The game was announced in April 2001 and released in May of that year. It received mixed reviews from critics, who gave varied opinions on the quality of the game's graphics and the suitability of the ten-year-old computer-based gameplay on a modern handheld game console, and generally found the game best suited for fans of the original series or younger players.

== Gameplay ==
Keen standing in a level on Fribbulus Xax; a Bloog enemy is approaching from the left, while two point items are in the upper right. Unlike prior games, no display is given during a level to show the player's current points or lives.

Commander Keen is a side-scrolling platform video game: the majority of the game features the player-controlled Commander Keen viewed from the side while moving on a two-dimensional plane. The player can move left and right and can jump, and can use a pogo stick to bounce continuously and jump higher than they can normally with the correct timing. The levels are composed of platforms on which Keen can stand, viewed from the side as in the original Commander Keen in Invasion of the Vorticons trilogy, and some platforms allow Keen to jump up through them from below. The game also includes moving platforms and teleporters that Keen can respectively jump on and interact with. In between levels, the player travels on a two-dimensional map, viewed from above; from the map, the player can enter levels by approaching the entrance. Once entered, the only way to exit a level is to reach the end, or by resetting the game. When a level is completed, the player is given a password that records their progress, lives, and points; this password is entered when starting the game in order to resume where the player left off. The game is divided into three worlds, connected by a central hub area where the game begins and where Keen starts whenever a password is entered.

The levels contain a variety of enemies, which the player must stun, destroy, or avoid; these are primarily different alien creatures. Levels can also include hazards, such as spikes or fire; touching a hazard or most enemies causes Keen to lose a life, and the game is ended if all of Keen's lives are lost. The game features three difficulty settings, which change the number and types of enemies present. While the raygun in Vorticons killed enemies, and the stun gun in Goodbye, Galaxy and Aliens Ate My Babysitter permanently stunned them, Keen's Neural Ray Blaster in this game only temporarily stuns enemies, who must then be jumped on with the pogo stick to be killed or destroyed. Stunned enemies can be bypassed until they wake up again, and unlike prior games the blaster does not require collectible ammo, though only one shot can be fired at a time. The player can also find food items throughout the levels which award points; collecting enough points gives an extra life. There are also items which award an extra life once enough have been collected, colored keycard gems which grant access to locked parts of levels, and items which instantly grant an extra life.

== Plot ==
In the prologue to the game, as detailed in the game's manual, eight-year-old child genius Billy Blaze is preparing to eat his cereal and watch television when the set displays nothing but static. A sub-space anomaly has mysteriously appeared in the Earth's core, and is disrupting life all over the planet. Donning his helmet as Commander Keen, Billy rushes off to discover what is affecting the Earth. He flies to the source, only to discover that the Shikadi from Goodbye, Galaxy, the Bloogs from Aliens Ate My Babysitter, and his "old enemies" the Droidicus—not present in a previous game—have joined forces and are working with his arch-rival Mortimer McMire. Together they created the Omegamatic Warp Drive, powered by three plasma crystals, to destroy the universe. Keen immediately sets off to find the crystals on the three planets linked to the Omegamatic: Droidicus Prime, Shikadi, and Fribbulus Xax.

Upon retrieving all three plasma crystals and destroying the Omegamatic Warp Drive, Keen is confronted by McMire, who tells him that he will not be so lucky the next time before teleporting away; Keen responds that he still defeated McMire, and will make it home in time for dinner. The game then congratulates the player on winning, and warns that with McMire still at large, Keen never knows when he will be called on again to defend the Earth.

== Development ==
The Commander Keen series originated in 1990 when John Carmack, then a game programmer at Softdisk, devised a method called adaptive tile refresh to produce smoothly scrolling graphics for a 2D platform video game engine on IBM PC compatible general-purpose computers. Carmack and a group of his coworkers from Softdisk—including programmer John Romero, designer Tom Hall, and artist Adrian Carmack—used their tile scrolling technique to make an original trilogy of shareware episodes for publisher Apogee Software. The game, Commander Keen in Invasion of the Vorticons, was a large success for the market, and led the group to quit their jobs and found id Software. The game was followed by four more episodes during 1991: Keen Dreams, a pair titled Goodbye, Galaxy, and Aliens Ate My Babysitter. Further plans were made for another trilogy to be produced in 1992 under the name The Universe is Toast, but before any work began it was canceled due to the success of id's Wolfenstein 3D and development focus on Doom. Id did not return to the series afterwards, instead continuing to focus on 3D first-person shooters.

In October 1999 during an online question and answer session, John Carmack, while discussing that the original founders of id Software were unlikely to ever work together on a game again, mentioned that he was considering the idea of making a Commander Keen game for the Game Boy Color handheld game console. IGN, when reporting the statement, mentioned that the idea was not unfeasible, especially given that another 1991 side-scroller, Apogee's Duke Nukem, had just been ported to the same platform. No further mention was made of such a game until April 2001, when id CEO Todd Hollenshead said that such a game had been created, and had been submitted to Nintendo for approval. Activision formally announced at the start of May that a new Commander Keen game had been developed by David A. Palmer Productions, and would be released at the end of the month. An interview the following week with founder David A. Palmer explained that the original idea for the game came from id, who approached Activision to produce it; Activision in turn recommended Palmer as the developer for the project. Palmer greatly admired id's games, and had been attempting to get an agreement with id and Activision for several years for his studio to make a Game Boy Color version of several of their games, such as the 1993 Doom or 1996 Quake. While Palmer was the developer for the game—with Palmer himself serving as the producer, Jim Meston as lead artist, and Mark Cooksey as composer—id collaborated with the studio, with id having approval over game design elements and artist Adrian Carmack making some tile artwork for the game.

Though the game was initially reported as a "remake" of the originals, Activision announced it as "based on" the original series. This was further elaborated on in the David A. Palmer interview, who clarified that the game incorporated elements from multiple games in the series, with care taken to keep them as similar as possible to the original games; he noted that it did not include elements from some games, like Keen Dreams, where id did not hold the rights. The game was released on May 29, 2001.

== Reception ==
Reception

Aggregate score
Aggregator	Score
GameRankings	65%

Review scores
Publication	Score
AllGame	2.5/5
Eurogamer	8/10
GameSpot	6.8/10
IGN	6/10
Pocket Games	6/10

Commander Keen received mixed reviews from critics. The graphics were both praised and criticized; Jason White of AllGame praised the art style and the "bright and colorful" graphics, and Peter Sellers of IGN similarly praised the graphical upgrade over the original computer games and the colorful style, but Sellers also criticized the "busy" backgrounds and lackluster animations as making the game feel "choppy". Frank Provo of GameSpot more harshly criticized the graphics, adding a complaint that the graphical updates did not reflect the ten years since the last releases to the criticisms of the backgrounds and animations. He gave similar criticisms of the music and sound effects' lack of upgrade from the quality of the ten-year-old original games.

The gameplay similarly received mixed opinions; John "Gestalt" Bye of Eurogamer praised the difficult, "old school" gameplay as a successful adaptation of the originals, though with minor dislikes of the boss battles and shortness of gameplay, while Sellers of IGN noted the "aging" gameplay that, while sound, did not compare as well to more recent games. Pocket Games claimed that the gameplay was both faithful to the original games and "boring and repetitive". GameSpot's Provo termed the difficult gameplay an "acquired taste", and one which was better suited to a system where players could save anywhere, while AllGame's White criticized the size of the levels, which he felt were ill-suited to the small screen of the Game Boy Color and which led to tedious hunting for where to go next. White, Provo, and Eurogamer all concluded that the game was best suited for fans of the original series or younger players.
