= Shadow Knights =

1991 video game

- Cover art
- Developer: id Software
- Publisher: Softdisk
- Designers: John Carmack; John Romero
- Programmers: John Carmack; John Romero
- Platform: DOS
- Release: 1991
- Genre: Platform
- Mode: Single-player

Shadow Knights – The Shogun of Death, also known as Budo – The Art of Ninja Combat, is a ninja themed platform game. It was originally published by the software company Softdisk in 1991. (Note: The publication year of 1991 is derived from the in-game copyright notice.) Shadow Knights was developed for MS-DOS running on a PC. The game was developed in-house by four Softdisk employees: John Carmack, John Romero, Adrian Carmack and Tom Hall. Soon after these four developers would leave Softdisk to startup the video game company id Software.

== Plot ==
The prospering land of Naipusan falls under siege by warriors from the North led by the evil shogun Sashika. For many years Sashika grew in power and began learning dark magic. Some said that Sashika was possessed by the demon Kuskuro. In the wake of the never-ending reign of terror, a ninja born in the east whose arrival foretold by sages comes to remove Sashika from his seat of power and rule Naipusan fairly.

== Gameplay ==
Shadow Knights is a platform game. The player goes through nine levels, slaying enemies with both sword and magic stars and collecting powerups. The player has limited vitality and magic power to survive. The player can accumulate power by collecting magic orbs. The ninja has healing and weapon powers. Some level areas require the player to defeat a boss monster to progress.

== Development ==
Before video game company id Software was founded by John Carmack, John Romero, Adrian Carmack and Tom Hall on February 1st, 1991, its four founders worked as employees at the software company Softdisk. There they worked on a PC game subscription service called Gamer's Edge. In October 1990, the team completed work on the game Slordax: The Unknown Enemy, a vertically scrolling shooter for Gamer's Edge. During that month, programmer John Carmack further extended the smooth scrolling technique with the ability to scroll in horizontal direction. Impressed by this technology, the team made plans to startup their own company and produce their own platform game. However, to ensure a stable income, they kept their day jobs at Softdisk for the time being. During the day they worked for Softdisk on Gamer's Edge, while during the evenings and weekends they worked on their own platform game: Commander Keen in Invasion of the Vorticons.

On November 1st, 1990 they started to work on the next game for Gamer's Edge: Shadow Knights. To reduce context switching, they intentionally picked a platform game as their next game, as both Commander Keen and Shadow Knights would utilize the same game engine and tooling. While Shadow Knights was in development, Softdisk CEO Al Vekovius noticed the smooth scrolling technology. As he had never seen that kind of technology on PC hardware before, he suggested John Carmack to file a software patent. However, Carmack immediately refused and threatened to resign. The biography Masters of Doom explains Carmack's reaction by referring to his strong support for open-source software. Tom Hall designed a few of the levels in Shadow Knights. The level maps were designed using a custom-made program called Tile Editor (TEd), which was first created for Dangerous Dave.

== Release ==
Shadow Knights was initially distributed as part of the Gamer's Edge subscription service. In 1992, the game was marketed by Softdisk as part of The Lost Game Collection of ID Software. The game was re-released in 1993 for the retail market under the title Budo – The Art of Ninja Combat by the short-lived publishing company Froggman. In 1996, id Software distributed Shadow Knights as part of their id Anthology collection.

== Reception ==
Gaming website IGN describes the console-style action in Shadow Knights as impressive for an MS-DOS title of that time period. However, IGN concludes that the game does not look as pretty as Commander Keen and is also smaller in size. Kotaku summarizes Shadow Knights as "id does Shinobi".
