= Mark Rein (executive) =

Canadian entrepreneur and gaming executive

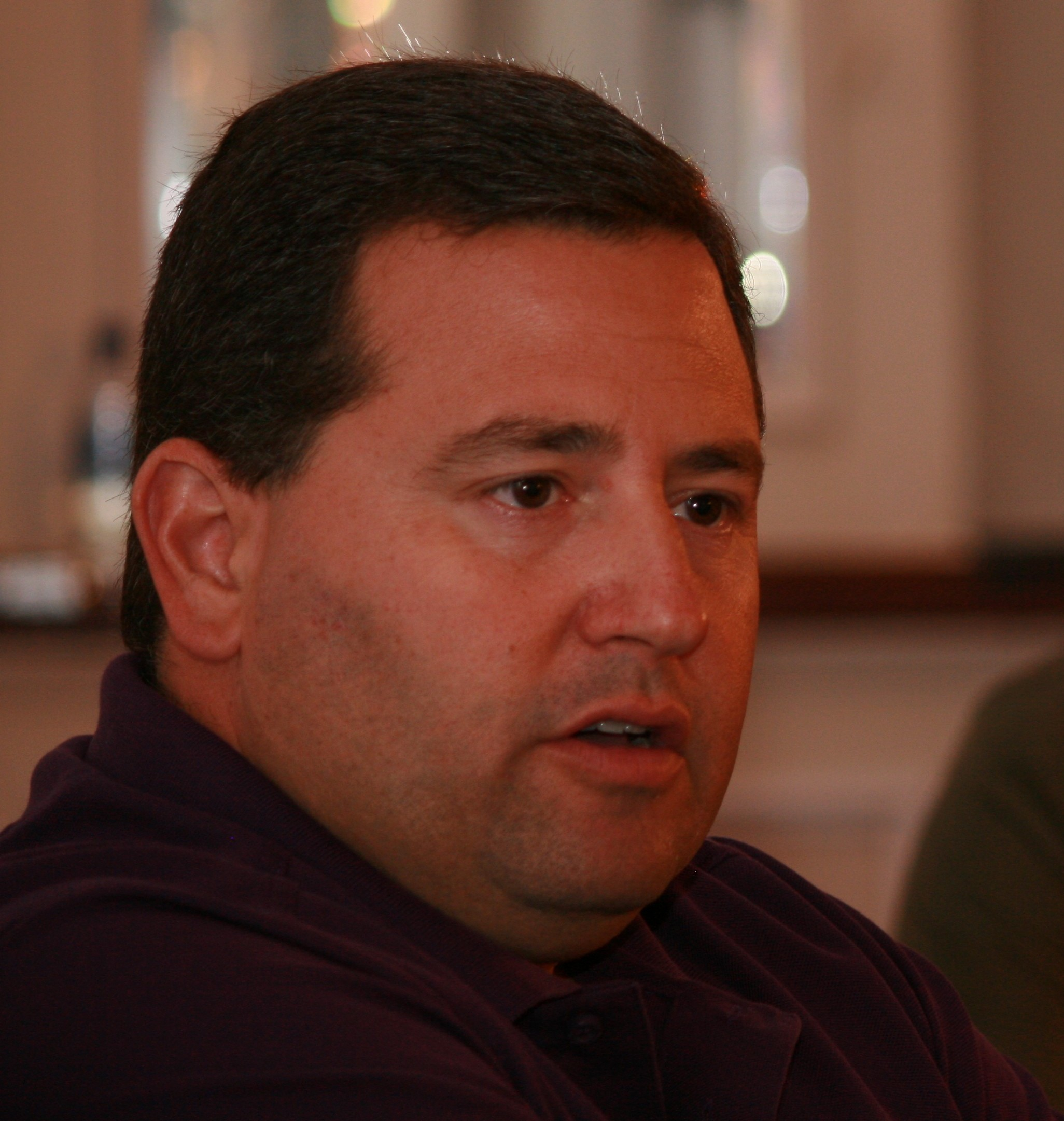
- Rein at the 2012 Develop Conference in Brighton, UK
- Born: 2 May 1963 (age 63); Toronto, Ontario, Canada
- Occupation: Entrepreneur
- Years active: 1992–present
- Notable work: Driving the business development of Fortnite, Gears of War, and the Unreal series
- Title: Vice president of Epic Games

Mark A. Rein is a Canadian entrepreneur and the vice president of video game and software development company Epic Games. He is also a co-owner of the NHL's Carolina Hurricanes.

Rein often gives assessments of the progress of his company and gives a monthly update in the magazine Game Developer where he also provides updates on the state of the Unreal Engine.

== Career ==
Rein first got involved in the video game industry when he got in touch with John Romero, who at that time worked for id Software. Since Rein was a fan of the previous Commander Keen games, Romero got him to playtest the then under development Commander Keen 4. Rein was then brought in to handle the business side of id as its "probationary president".

He then negotiated a deal with FormGen to publish a retail Commander Keen game, Commander Keen in Aliens Ate My Babysitter. This business relationship with id lasted until Spear of Destiny (which again, he negotiated as a retail version of Wolfenstein 3D). During the development of Wolfenstein 3D, he was later let go from id after a difference of opinion with the rest of the staff. He was also later joined at Epic by Jay Wilbur, id's ex-business manager, and Rein's involvement in id did mean that he was briefly mentioned in the book Masters of Doom.

During the 2021 Epic Games v. Apple antitrust trial, Apple listed Rein, then Epic's vice president of business development, as a potential witness. Trial testimony indicated that Rein held a 4% stake in Epic Games, which The News & Observer estimated based on the company's most recent valuation would be about $1.1 billion.

== Personal life ==
Rein resides in Raleigh, North Carolina, though he was raised in Toronto, Ontario, Canada.
