= Commander Keen in Goodbye, Galaxy =

1991 video game

- Developer: id Software
- Publisher: Apogee Software
- Designer: Tom Hall
- Programmers: John Carmack; John Romero; Jason Blochowiak
- Artist: Adrian Carmack
- Composer: Robert Prince
- Series: Commander Keen
- Platforms: DOS, Windows
- Release: December 15, 1991
- Genre: Side-scrolling platformer
- Mode: Single-player

Commander Keen in Goodbye, Galaxy (stylized as Goodbye, Galaxy!) is a two-part episodic side-scrolling platform video game developed by id Software and published by Apogee Software in 1991 for DOS. It consists of the fifth and sixth episodes of the Commander Keen series, though they are numbered as the fourth and fifth, as Commander Keen in Keen Dreams is not part of the main continuity. The game follows the titular Commander Keen, an eight-year-old child genius, as he first journeys through the Shadowlands to rescue the Gnosticenes so they may ask the Oracle how the Shikadi plan to destroy the galaxy, and then through the Shikadi's Armageddon Machine to stop them. The two episodes feature Keen running, jumping, and shooting through various levels while opposed by aliens, robots, and other hazards.

After the success of Commander Keen in Invasion of the Vorticons, the developers of the game, including programmers John Carmack and John Romero, designer Tom Hall, and artist Adrian Carmack, left their jobs at Softdisk to found id Software. After making a prototype game in Keen Dreams to develop new ideas such as gameplay changes, graphical enhancements, and artistic improvements, the team worked on making a sequel trilogy of episodes from June to December 1991. During development the last episode was split off to be released as a stand-alone game, Commander Keen in Aliens Ate My Babysitter, with the remaining two episodes produced as a pair instead of a trilogy.

Goodbye, Galaxy did not initially sell as well as the first trilogy, which was attributed by the publisher and designer to its lack of a third episode hurting it given the shareware model of publishing. The pair of episodes has since been referred to as "Apogee's hottest sellers", however. Reviews of the series praised the challenge and humor in the graphics and gameplay, especially in Goodbye, Galaxy. Although another Keen game was planned, during development id Software began work on Wolfenstein 3D, and its success, along with the development of Doom, led id to not develop any further Keen games.

== Gameplay ==
Gameplay in "Secret of the Oracle". Both stunned and un-stunned enemies can be seen, as can dart traps, water droplets, and a yellow keycard gem.

The two episodes of Commander Keen in Goodbye, Galaxy are side-scrolling platform video games: the majority of the game features the player-controlled Commander Keen viewed from the side while moving on a two-dimensional plane. The player can move left and right and can jump, and can use a pogo stick to bounce continuously and jump higher than they can normally with the correct timing. The levels are composed of platforms on which Keen can stand, viewed from slightly above so as to give a pseudo-3D effect, and some platforms allow Keen to jump up through them from below, while others feature fireman's poles that Keen can climb up or down. Keen can also grab onto the edge of platforms and pull himself up. Once entered, the only way to exit a level is to reach the end, though unlike in the first trilogy of episodes, Commander Keen in Invasion of the Vorticons, the player can save their game at any point. In between levels the player travels on a two-dimensional map, viewed from above; from the map the player can enter levels by approaching the entrance or save their progress in the game. Some levels are optional to enter and may be bypassed.

Both of the episodes contain a different set of enemies in their levels, which the player must stun or avoid. The first episode contains a variety of alien creatures, including large slugs, giant bouncing mushrooms, and flying bats, while the second contains different types of robots and alien energy beings. Levels can also include hazards, such as dart traps or fire; touching a hazard or most enemies causes Keen to lose a life, and the game is ended if all of Keen's lives are lost. The episodes feature three difficulty settings, which change the number and types of enemies present. While Vorticons contained a raygun and the in-between episode Commander Keen in Keen Dreams had pellets that temporarily stunned enemies, Goodbye, Galaxy features a stun gun that knocks out most enemies permanently using ammo found throughout the game. Different enemies take differing numbers of shots to kill, or in some cases are immune. The player can also find food items throughout the levels which grant points, with an extra life awarded with enough points. The first episode also contains water droplets which award an extra life for every 100 drops, and the second green drinks which do the same. There are also colored keycards which grant access to locked parts of levels, and items which instantly grant an extra life.

== Plot ==
The game is broken up into two episodes: "Secret of the Oracle" and "The Armageddon Machine". In the first episode, having defeated the Grand Intellect in Invasion of the Vorticons and saved the Earth, eight-year-old child Billy Blaze is building a faster-than-light communications radio. Upon completing it, he hears a transmission announcing that a race of aliens known as the Shikadi are planning to destroy the galaxy. Donning his helmet as Commander Keen, he takes off in his spaceship—first stunning his parents with his neural stunner gun as they call him in to dinner—for the planet of Gnosticus IV, home of the Oracle and the Gnosticenes that tend it, to find out who the Shikadi are and how they plan to destroy the galaxy. Upon arriving, he is met by a Council Page, who tells him that the council of immortal Gnosticenes have been kidnapped by the Shikadi and taken "to the Shadowlands far to the west", leaving monsters and traps to guard them. Keen journeys through the outposts and temples of the Shadowlands, rescuing all of the Gnosticenes, and afterwards they turn on the Oracle machine. The Oracle tells Keen that the Shikadi are "shadow beings from the far side of the galaxy" who are building an Armageddon Machine at Korath III to blow up the galaxy and rebuild it as they wish afterwards. As the episode ends, Keen sets off to stop them.

In "The Armageddon Machine", Keen journeys through the giant Armageddon Machine space station, destroying the subsystems of the machine located in each level. Along the way, he learns that the Shikadi are being led by the "Gannalech". After Keen reaches the final level and destroys the Quantum Explosion Dynamo, the Shikadi flee the station, and either leave Korath III via their getaway ship or are left stranded, depending on whether Keen destroys a fuse in the secret level. Keen looks in the control room to find out why the Shikadi wanted to destroy the galaxy; there, he finds a note, written in the series' Standard Galactic Alphabet cypher, from the final boss of the Vorticons trilogy: his school rival Mortimer McMire, whose IQ is "a single point higher" than Keen's. The note tells Keen that the McMire killed in the previous game was an android replica, that the "Gannalech" is a mispronunciation of "Grand Intellect", his title from the first trilogy, and that the Armageddon Machine was itself a distraction, as McMire plans on destroying the universe instead. As Keen leaves the command center, the game screen focuses on an abandoned football helmet in the room like Keen's, with two Ms on it.

== Development ==
In October–December 1990, a team of employees from programming studio Softdisk, calling themselves Ideas from the Deep, developed the three-part video game Commander Keen in Invasion of the Vorticons. The group, who worked at Softdisk in Shreveport, Louisiana developing games for the Gamer's Edge video game subscription service and disk magazine, was composed of programmers John Romero and John Carmack, designer Tom Hall, artist Adrian Carmack, and manager Jay Wilbur. After the release of the game in December, and the arrival of the first US$10,500 royalty check from shareware publisher Apogee Software, the team quit Softdisk and started their own company, id Software. As part of the settlement with Softdisk—made because the team had created the game on their work computers, both in the office after hours and by taking the computers to John Carmack's house on the weekends—they agreed to make a series of games for Softdisk's Gamer's Edge subscription service. As the team began to explore creating another set of Commander Keen games, they made a prototype game for Softdisk, Commander Keen in Keen Dreams, to fulfill their obligations while also helping improve the next full set of Keen games.

For Invasion of the Vorticons, John Carmack and Romero focused exclusively on the programming, while Adrian Carmack joined late in development and had a personal art style that did not match with the game. As a result, the game was largely shaped by designer Tom Hall's personal experiences and interests. Keen's red sneakers and Green Bay Packers football helmet were items Hall wore as a child, dead enemies left behind corpses due to his belief that child players should be taught that death had permanent consequences, and enemies were based loosely on his reading of Sigmund Freud's psychological theories, such as that of the id. The team reprised their roles for both Keen Dreams and Goodbye, Galaxy, with the addition of programmer Jason Blochowiak for Goodbye, Galaxy, and changed the game engine and design for the next Keen games: an increase in graphical quality, a pseudo-3D view rather than a side-on view, ramps rather than solely flat surfaces, support for sound cards, and changes to the design based on player feedback. The level maps were designed using a custom-made program called Tile Editor (TEd), which was first created for Dangerous Dave and was used for the entire Keen series as well as several other games. The working title for the game was Commander Keen II – Goodbye Galaxy.

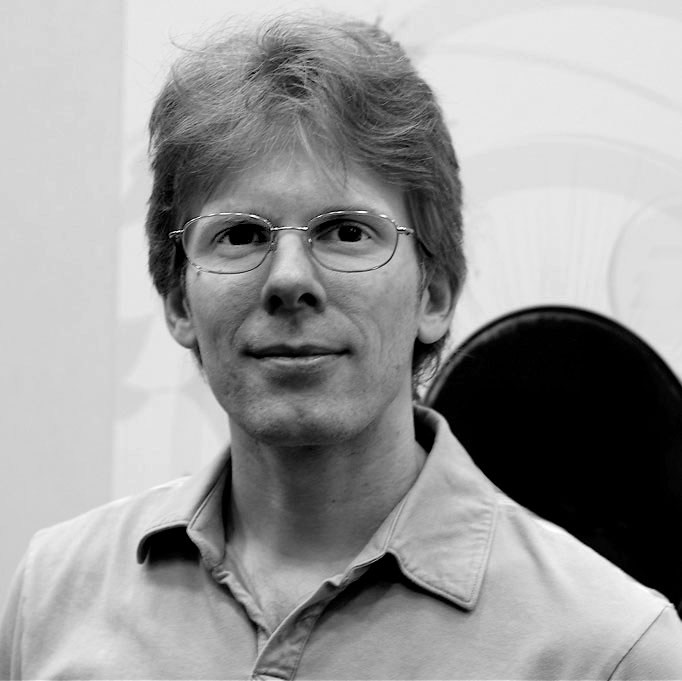
John Carmack in 2006

For Vorticons, Carmack had created adaptive tile refresh to produce a scrolling effect on computers not powerful enough to redraw the entire screen when the player moved. For Goodbye, Galaxy, he wanted to scroll the background at a different rate than the foreground, or parallax scrolling, but again computers of the time were not powerful enough to do so smoothly. Instead, he had them scroll at the same rate, and came up with a plan to save combinations of overlapping foreground and background elements in memory and display the appropriate combination for where Keen was on the screen, so that the game only needed to pick the correct image rather than keep track of both the foreground and background. Hall, meanwhile, had received feedback from parents who did not like that the enemies in Vorticons left behind corpses instead of disappearing like in other games; he did not want the violence to have no effects, and so in Dreams replaced the raygun with pellets that temporarily stunned enemies. He was not satisfied with this change, and while considering ways to remove Keen's parents during the introduction for Goodbye, Galaxy, came up with a stun gun which would leave behind permanently stunned enemies. Additionally, music, which was not included in prior Keen games, was added to Goodbye, Galaxy, composed by Bobby Prince. To create the music, Prince used iMuse and tweaked the music tracks with eight-bar loops to minimise the disk space they occupied. The music used in stages such as "Lifewater Oasis" had been written for a Keen Dreams cinematic, with the melodies corresponding to the characters' dialogue and tone of voice, but was repurposed for Goodbye, Galaxy when the cinematic was rejected due to space limitations.

In June 1991, with Keen Dreams completed, the id team began working on another trilogy of Commander Keen episodes. The game, episodes four though six, was intended to be published as a set named Goodbye, Galaxy in the same manner as the first one: released through Apogee, with episode four released for free in order to spur interest in purchasing the other two episodes. By August they had completed a beta version of episode four, "Secret of the Oracle", and Romero sent it off to a fan he had met from Canada, Mark Rein, who had offered to play-test the game. Romero was impressed with the list of bugs that Rein sent back, as well as with his business sense, and proposed bringing him in to the company as a probationary president for six months in order to help expand their business. Within a few weeks of being hired, Rein made a deal to get id into the commercial market: to take the sixth episode and make it a stand-alone game, published as a retail title through FormGen instead of part of a shareware trilogy. Id signed the deal, but Scott Miller of Apogee was dismayed; he felt that not having a full trilogy for the shareware game would hurt sales.

Also in August 1991, the team moved from Shreveport to Hall's hometown of Madison, Wisconsin, leaving behind Wilbur, who was unwilling to leave a stable job at Softdisk to fully join in with the startup, but picking up programmer Jason Blochowiak, who was working at the time at Softdisk and living at the same house as John Carmack and Wilbur. Once there, the team worked out of a three-bedroom apartment, with John Carmack living in one of the bedrooms. There, they worked on Goodbye, Galaxy, their remaining Softdisk games, and the now standalone Commander Keen in Aliens Ate My Babysitter between August and December. A software catalog released by Apogee in June initially listed the game as planned for September 21, 1991, but this release date was not followed. As it grew colder, they increasingly spent all of their time in the apartment, making the games and designing a game that would later become Wolfenstein 3D. Despite being listed numerically as the sixth episode, because Aliens Ate My Babysitter had a different publisher and schedule it was developed after "Secret of the Oracle" but before "The Armageddon Machine". The fifth episode, however, was created in less than one month.

== Reception ==
After its release in December 1991, Goodbye, Galaxy met with sales "about a third" of the original trilogy, which had made US$20,000 in its first two weeks and US$60,000 a month by June 1991. Scott Miller of Apogee blamed the falling sales on the lack of a third episode, which he felt undercut the shareware model of the game. Tom Hall has also claimed that the split hurt the sales of the shareware game, though he has said that "they still did decently, though". PC Zone, in its first issue in 1993, quoted shareware distributors as saying Goodbye, Galaxy was one of the top shareware sellers of 1992, behind Wolfenstein 3D. IGN has also referred to the pair of episodes as "Apogee's hottest sellers".

Tom Hall has claimed "The Armageddon Machine" as the best Commander Keen episode and his favorite. In October 1992, the Shareware Industry Awards gave the Commander Keen series the "Best Entertainment Software and Best Overall" award. A review of the entire Commander Keen series in 1993 by Sandy Petersen in the first "Eye of the Monitor" column for Dragon described the series as action games with "hilarious graphics". Acknowledging its debt to Super Mario Bros., he called it, especially Goodbye, Galaxy, "one of the best games of its type" and praised that it was not "mindlessly hard", instead requiring some thought to play through, and especially the humor in the graphics and gameplay.

== Legacy ==
Id Software did not produce any more games in the Commander Keen series after Goodbye Galaxy besides the co-developed Aliens Ate My Babysitter. Another trilogy of episodes, titled The Universe Is Toast, was planned for December 1992, but was cancelled after the success of id's Wolfenstein 3D and development focus on Doom. When GT Interactive wanted to publish Doom II, it proved itself to id by quickly selling 30,000 copies of Goodbye Galaxy. A final Keen game, Commander Keen, was developed for the Game Boy Color in 2001 by David A. Palmer Productions in association with id Software, and published by Activision. Goodbye Galaxy has been released as part of several collections since its first release: the id Anthology compilation in 1996, a compilation release by Apogee in 1998 of Invasion of the Vorticons and Goodbye, Galaxy, a similar compilation in 2001 by 3D Realms titled Commander Keen Combo CD, and the 3D Realms Anthology in 2014. They have also been released for modern computers through a DOS emulator, and sold through Steam since 2007 as a part of the Commander Keen Complete Pack. According to Steam Spy, as of June 2016 approximately 200,000 copies have been sold through Steam.

One of the enemies created for "Secret of the Oracle", the Dopefish, has since the game's release become a video game industry in-joke, making cameo appearances in other games. The Dopefish, which Hall describes as "just a stupid green fish", is described in "Secret of the Oracle" as "the second-dumbest creature in the universe". It has appeared in dozens of other games since its initial appearance.

== Sources ==
- Kushner, David (2004-05-11). Masters of Doom: How Two Guys Created an Empire and Transformed Pop Culture. Random House. ISBN 978-0-8129-7215-3.
- Ramsay, Morgan (2015-01-07). Online Game Pioneers at Work. Apress. ISBN 978-1-4302-4185-0.
- Pinchbeck, Dan (2013). Doom: Scarydarkfast. University of Michigan Press. ISBN 978-0-472-05191-5.
