= Commander Keen in Aliens Ate My Babysitter =

1991 video game

- Developer: id Software
- Publisher: FormGen
- Designer: Tom Hall
- Programmers: John Carmack; John Romero; Jason Blochowiak
- Artist: Adrian Carmack
- Composer: Robert Prince
- Series: Commander Keen
- Platforms: DOS, Windows
- Release: December 1991
- Genre: Side-scrolling platformer
- Mode: Single-player

Commander Keen in Aliens Ate My Babysitter (stylized as Aliens Ate My Babysitter!) is a side-scrolling platform video game developed by id Software and published by FormGen in December 1991 for DOS. It is the seventh episode of the Commander Keen series, though it is numbered as the sixth, as Commander Keen in Keen Dreams is outside of the main continuity. The game follows the titular Commander Keen, an eight-year-old child genius, as he journeys through an alien world to rescue his kidnapped babysitter. The game features Keen running, jumping, and shooting through various levels while opposed by aliens, robots, and other hazards.

After the success of the three-episode Commander Keen in Invasion of the Vorticons, the developers of the game, including programmers John Carmack and John Romero, designer Tom Hall, and artist Adrian Carmack, left their jobs at Softdisk to found id Software. After making a prototype game in Dreams to develop new ideas such as gameplay changes, graphical enhancements, and artistic improvements, the team worked on making a sequel trilogy of episodes from June to December 1991. During development, the last episode was split off to be released as a stand-alone game due to a deal made by id's new president, Mark Rein, with the remaining two episodes produced as a pair titled Commander Keen in Goodbye, Galaxy instead. Aliens, despite being released as the sixth main episode in the series, was developed before the fifth. It did not sell as well as the first trilogy, which was attributed by id to poor marketing and its awkward status as a stand-alone retail game in a series known for groups of shareware episodes. Although another Keen game was planned, during development id Software began work on Wolfenstein 3D, and its success, along with the development of Doom, led id to not develop any further Keen games.

== Gameplay ==
Commander Keen inside of a level. A stunned enemy has just been shot to the left of Keen; also present are food point items and two life-granting collectable items. Keen's current points, ammo, and lives are in the box in the upper left.

Commander Keen in Aliens Ate My Babysitter is a side-scrolling platform video game: the majority of the game features the player-controlled Commander Keen viewed from the side while moving on a two-dimensional plane. The player can move left and right and can jump, and can use a pogo stick to bounce continuously and jump higher than they can normally with the correct timing. The levels are composed of platforms on which Keen can stand, viewed from slightly above. Some platforms allow Keen to jump up through them from below, while others feature fireman's poles that Keen can climb up or down. Keen can also grab onto the edge of platforms and pull himself up. There are giant switches which must be jumped up into or dropped onto to flip which have effects on the gameworld, such as retracting and extending gates or initiate moving platforms. Once entered, the only way to exit a level is to reach the end, though the player can save their game at any point. Between levels, the player travels on a two-dimensional map, viewed from above; from the map the player can enter levels by approaching the entrance or save their progress in the game. Some levels are optional to enter and may be bypassed, while portions of the map are gated off until specific levels are completed.

The game contains a variety of enemies in the levels, which the player must stun or avoid; these are primarily different alien creatures. Levels can also include hazards, such as dart traps or fire; touching a hazard or most enemies causes Keen to lose a life, and the game is ended if all of Keen's lives are lost. Aliens has three difficulty settings, which change the number and types of enemies present. It features a stun gun that knocks out most enemies permanently using ammo found throughout the game. Different enemies take differing numbers of shots to knock out, or, in some cases, are immune. The player can also find food items throughout the levels which grant points, with an extra life awarded with enough points. There are also small fly-like creatures which award an extra life for every 100 collected, colored keycard gems which grant access to locked parts of levels, and items which instantly grant an extra life.

== Plot ==
Despite being the sixth episode in the series, Aliens is not clearly stated to take place after the events of the pair of episodes in Galaxy. In the game's introduction, eight-year-old child genius Billy Blaze is working on his wrist computer in his backyard clubhouse when his babysitter, Molly McMire, calls him in for dinner. Upon hearing a loud noise he rushes out, only to discover her missing and a note burnt into the grass stating that the Bloogs of Fribbulus Xax have taken Molly and plan to eat her; donning his helmet as Commander Keen, Billy rushes off to save her before his parents get home. During the game, Keen journeys through the various outposts, factories, and installations of the alien Bloogs on the planet of Fribbulus Xax as well as a space station above it.

After Keen finds Molly tied up at the back of the Bloog Control Center on the space station, she explains to him that she was kidnapped on the orders of her younger brother, who Keen knows to be his nemesis Mortimer McMire. Mortimer convinced the Bloogs to kidnap her by offering them the Stupendous Sandwich of Chungella IV. Keen is surprised, as he thought Mortimer was dead (he was apparently killed at the end of the Vorticon trilogy), and is dismayed to find out that Mortimer plans to blow up the entire universe. This conclusion is also revealed in an encoded note at the end of the Galaxy. The game ends by asking the player to play the next installment, where Keen would again fight Mortimer.

== Development ==
In October—December 1990, a team of employees from programming studio Softdisk, calling themselves Ideas from the Deep, developed the three-part video game Commander Keen in Invasion of the Vorticons. The group, who worked at Softdisk in Shreveport, Louisiana developing games for the Gamer's Edge video game subscription service and disk magazine, was composed of programmers John Romero and John Carmack, designer Tom Hall, artist Adrian Carmack, and manager Jay Wilbur. After the release of Vorticons in December, and the arrival of the first US$10,500 royalty check from shareware publisher Apogee Software, the team quit Softdisk and started their own company, id Software. As part of the settlement with Softdisk—made because the team had created the game on their work computers, both in the office after hours and by taking the computers to John Carmack's house on the weekends—they agreed to make a series of games for Softdisk's Gamer's Edge subscription service. As the team began to explore creating another set of Commander Keen games, they made a prototype game for Softdisk, Commander Keen in Keen Dreams, to fulfill their obligations while also helping improve the next full set of Keen games.

For Vorticons, John Carmack and Romero focused exclusively on the programming, while Adrian Carmack joined late in development and had a personal art style that did not match with the game. As a result, the game was largely shaped by designer Tom Hall's personal experiences and interests. Keen's red sneakers and Green Bay Packers football helmet were items Hall wore as a child, dead enemies left behind corpses due to his belief that child players should be taught that death had permanent consequences, and enemies were based loosely on his reading of Sigmund Freud's psychological theories, such as that of the id. The team reprised their roles for subsequent Keen games, with the addition of programmer Jason Blochowiak for Galaxy and Aliens, and changed the game engine and design for the next Keen games: an increase in graphical quality, a pseudo-3D view rather than a side-on view, ramps rather than solely flat surfaces, support for sound cards, and changes to the design based on player feedback. The level maps were designed using a custom-made program called Tile Editor (TEd), which was first created for Dangerous Dave and was used for the entire Keen series as well as several other games.

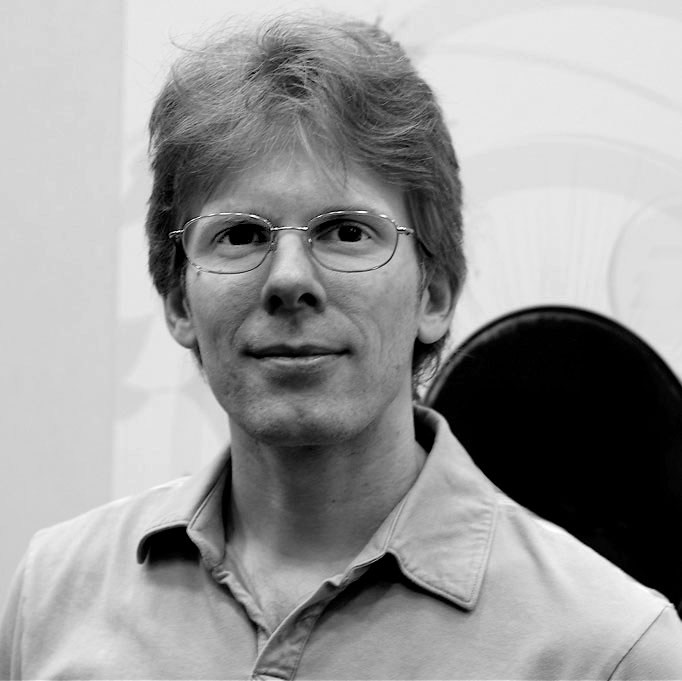
John Carmack in 2006

For Vorticons, Carmack had created adaptive tile refresh to produce a scrolling effect on computers not powerful enough to redraw the entire screen when the player moved. For Galaxy and Aliens, he wanted to scroll the background at a different rate than the foreground, or parallax scrolling, but again computers of the time were not powerful enough to do so smoothly. Instead, he had them scroll at the same rate, and came up with a plan to save combinations of overlapping foreground and background elements in memory and display the appropriate combination for where Keen was on the screen, so that the game only needed to pick the correct image rather than keep track of both the foreground and background. Hall, meanwhile, had received feedback from parents who did not like that the enemies in Vorticons left behind corpses instead of disappearing like in other games; he did not want the violence to have no effects, and so in Dreams replaced the raygun with pellets that temporarily stunned enemies. He was not satisfied with this change, and while considering ways to remove Keen's parents during the introduction for Galaxy, came up with a stun gun which would leave behind permanently stunned enemies, which appeared in all three episodes made in 1991. Additionally, music, which was missing in prior Keen games, was added to Aliens, composed by Robert Prince.

In June 1991, with Dreams completed, the id team began working on another trilogy of Commander Keen episodes. The game, episodes four though six, was intended to be published in the same manner as the first one: released through Apogee, with episode four released for free in order to spur interest in purchasing the other two episodes. By August they had completed a beta version of episode four, "Secret of the Oracle", and Romero sent it off to a fan he had met from Canada, Mark Rein, who had offered to play-test the game. Romero was impressed with the list of bugs that Rein sent back, as well as with his business sense, and proposed bringing him in to the company as a probationary president for six months in order to help expand their business. Within a few weeks of being hired, Rein made a deal to get id into the commercial market: to take the sixth episode and make it a stand-alone game, published as a retail title through FormGen instead of part of a shareware trilogy. They signed the deal, but Scott Miller of Apogee was dismayed; he felt that not having a full trilogy for the shareware game would hurt sales.

Also in August 1991, the team moved from Shreveport to Hall's hometown of Madison, Wisconsin, leaving behind Wilbur, who was unwilling to leave a stable job at Softdisk to fully join in with the startup, but picking up programmer Jason Blochowiak, who was working at the time at Softdisk and living at the same house as John Carmack and Wilbur. Once there, the team worked out of a three-bedroom apartment, with John Carmack living in one of the bedrooms. There, they worked on the two episodes of Galaxy, their remaining Softdisk games, and the sixth episode, Aliens, between August and December. As it grew colder, they increasingly spent all of their time in the apartment, making the games, and designing a game that would later become Wolfenstein 3D. As Aliens had a different publisher and schedule than Galaxy, it was released as the sixth episode of the series but was actually developed prior to the fifth, "The Armageddon Machine".

== Reception and legacy ==
Aliens did not sell as well as hoped for by id, which the team partially blamed on what they felt was terrible box art produced by a company that had previously designed packaging for Lipton tea. According to John Carmack, the CGA version of the game wasn't very popular. Despite this, the sales were strong enough that id agreed to use FormGen as the publisher for their next retail title, the "Spear of Destiny" episode of Wolfenstein 3D. A description of the shareware market in the first issue of PC Zone in 1993 noted that Aliens, as it was also sold through shareware distributors like Apogee, was one of the most popular games of 1993 in the shareware market. A short review in the same issue as part of a listing of shareware games that could be ordered through the magazine called Aliens the "special edition" of the series and "the best one yet". The game won the "Best Entertainment Program" and "Best Overall Program" categories at the 1992 Shareware Industry Awards. A review of the entire Commander Keen series in 1993 by Sandy Petersen in the first "Eye of the Monitor" column for Dragon described the series as action games with "hilarious graphics". Acknowledging its debt to Super Mario Bros., he called it, especially Galaxy and Aliens, "one of the best games of its type". He also praised that it was not "mindlessly hard", instead requiring some thought to play through, and especially noted the humor in the graphics and gameplay.

After Aliens, id Software did not produce any more games in the Commander Keen series besides the co-developed Galaxy. Another trilogy of episodes, titled The Universe Is Toast, was planned for December 1992, but was cancelled after the success of id's Wolfenstein 3D and development focus on Doom. A final Keen game, Commander Keen, was developed for the Game Boy Color in 2001 by David A. Palmer Productions in association with id Software, and published by Activision. Aliens was included with the other id-developed series games in the 1996 id Anthology compilation release, but as the game had not been published through Apogee, it was not included in the 1998 Apogee Commander Keen compilation release, or the 2014 3D Realms Anthology release.

== Sources ==
- Kushner, David (2004-05-11). Masters of Doom: How Two Guys Created an Empire and Transformed Pop Culture. Random House. ISBN 978-0-8129-7215-3.
