= Slordax: The Unknown Enemy =

1991 video game

- Title screen
- Developer(s): Softdisk
- Publisher(s): Softdisk
- Director(s): Tom Hall
- Programmer(s): John Carmack; John Romero
- Artist(s): Adrian Carmack
- Platform(s): MS-DOS
- Release: 1991
- Genre(s): Scrolling shooter
- Mode(s): Single-player

Slordax: The Unknown Enemy is a vertically scrolling shooter for MS-DOS, published by the software company Softdisk in 1991. The game has 16-color graphics that scroll smoothly across the screen, which was technically impressive for a PC game at that time. Slordax was developed at Softdisk in September and October 1990 by programmers John Carmack and John Romero, game designer Tom Hall and artist Adrian Carmack. It was the first game that they developed as a team. Soon after they would leave Softdisk to form their own game company, called id Software.

== Plot ==
Seven centuries ago, a war was waged by the Slordax as they tried to conquer the universe. Currently the Intergalactic Defense Alliance believes that the Slordax will return and start another devastating war. The I.D.A. sends a fighter pilot in a RedDog Adaptive Strike Ship to destroy the enemy bases in the Realm of Slordax, before the Slordax can build up their forces.

== Gameplay ==
The player moves through five stages, including an asteroid belt and the surface of a planet. Enemy ships can drop capsules that can be picked up to upgrade the weapons on the player's ship. After all five stages are completed, the game loops back to the first stage while increasing the difficulty.

== Development ==
Slordax was developed in September and October 1990 by programmers John Carmack and John Romero, game designer Tom Hall and artist Adrian Carmack. At that time they were employed at the software company Softdisk. Slordax was the first game that they developed as a team.

The game engine was programmed by John Carmack, who developed the technique to smoothly scroll the 16-color graphics vertically. According to gaming website IGN, this was technically impressive for a PC game at that time. The remainder of the game, including the level editor, was programmed by John Romero. The level editor was called TED, or Tile EDitor. It was first used for creating levels for Slordax, but was designed to support future games as well. According to Romero, TED ended up being used for 33 published games.

The name Slordax was suggested by Tom Hall, who also wrote the story and designed half of the levels. The other half were designed by Romero. Adrian Carmack created all the art for the game, with the exception of the title screen. The team completed Slordax on October 31, 1990.

While Slordax was in development, John Carmack further improved the smooth scrolling technique with the ability to scroll in horizontal direction. Without informing Softdisk, the four team members used this technology to secretly develop their own game: Commander Keen in Invasion of the Vorticons. Soon after, on February 1, 1991, they founded their own game company, called id Software.

== Release ==
Slordax was initially published in 1991 by Softdisk as part of their Gamer's Edge bi-monthly subscription service. Later Softdisk marketed Slordax as part of The Lost Game Collection of ID Software along with several other games created by id Software on contract for Softdisk. The game company Ziggurat Interactive published Slordax on Steam and GOG.com in 2021.
