= Bio Menace =

1993 video game

- Developer: Apogee Software
- Publisher: Apogee Software
- Designer: Jim Norwood
- Composer: Robert Prince
- Engine: Commander Keen
- Platforms: MS-DOS, Windows, macOS, Linux, Nintendo Switch
- Release: August 3, 1993
- Genre: Platform
- Mode: Single-player

Bio Menace is a 1993 game developed and published by Apogee Software for MS-DOS. A 2D multidirectional scrolling platform game, it was built on a licensed version of id Software's Commander Keen game engine. Apart from the engine and music, all in-game content was created by the game's designer, Jim Norwood. In 2014, the game was re-released on Steam, and in 2015 on GOG.com with support for Microsoft Windows, macOS, and Linux. A remastered version was released on Steam and GOG.com in December 2025, and Nintendo Switch on 8 October 2026.

The player controls Snake Logan, a top CIA operative. Upon receiving reports of Metro City being invaded by mutants, Logan is ordered to fly recon over the city. However, after crash landing in Metro City, Logan is forced to complete his mission on foot.

== Gameplay ==
The beginning of the first level of Episode 1

The object of the game is to lead the main character Snake Logan to the exit of each level. In most cases the exit is blocked off by an energy field which will kill Snake instantly if he touches it, and must be turned off with either a keycard obtained when rescuing the level's hostage or a crystal shard acquired by killing the level's boss, depending on the level.

As is typical of the run and gun genre, the player character can walk, jump, shoot, and crouch. In addition, Snake can use grenades and land mines, which appear as pickups. Weapon powerups consist of machine guns (which allow sustained firing), plasma guns, and super guns. Except for the plasma gun, all of Snake's guns are hitscan, including the default gun. Unlike most powerups, machine gun magazines stack if another is collected while holding at least one. Certain enemies can only be killed by grenades, land mines, or the plasma gun. Apart from the default gun, all weapons have limited ammunition and are abandoned when the level is completed.

Depending on which of the three difficulty modes is selected, Snake has two, four, or eight bars of health. Health kit pickups restore health to its maximum. Some hazards and enemies kill Snake instantly if he comes in contact with them. If Snake is killed, the player loses a life and is sent back to the last checkpoint reached, with the level's state otherwise remaining as it was at the moment of Snake's death, even boss health bars. Extra lives are obtained by collecting 50 gems, reaching specific score thresholds, and getting extra life items from closets. The game can be saved to the beginning of each level.

Some levels contain a hidden level gem which takes the player to a secret level when the current level is completed. Secret levels are always short and usually contain an abundance of pickups, but sometimes also have an onslaught of enemies and/or hazards.

== Development ==
Bio Menace was called Bio Hazard during production. It was planned for release on November 15, 1991.

== Release ==
Bio Menace consists of three episodes. The first, "Dr. Mangle's Lab", was released as shareware. The other two were sold commercially: "The Hidden Lab" and "Master Cain". The game was discontinued in 2000 due to compatibility problems with newer operating systems.

== Reception ==
The game was reviewed in 1994 in Dragon #202 by Sandy Petersen in the "Eye of the Monitor" column. Petersen gave the game 2 out of 5 stars. The reviewer of the German magazine PC Games praised the behavior of animated enemies, the lack of movement jerks and noted a fast scrolling in all directions of movement. A shareware game reviewer of PC Review magazine commented that Bio Menace's animation of biomonsters differentiates it from Duke Nukem, but also noted that "Apogee needs to come up with something new".

In a retrospective review, a reviewer at Hardcore Gaming 101 praised the look of the game, noting that thanks to the Commander Keen engine, the game does not have the annoying stiffness of the era, and the control is satisfying. However, he also called the music a weak spot, and that Bobby Prince, who later wrote the Doom soundtrack, did not show his strong side here.

== Legacy ==
Apogee released the game as freeware on December 23, 2005, as a "Christmas present", and the full game can be downloaded from the Apogee website. In October 2014, 3D Realms released 3D Realms Anthology, which includes Bio Menace.
