= Commander Keen in Invasion of the Vorticons =

1990 episodic side-scrolling platform game

- Title screen of "Marooned on Mars"
- Developer: Ideas from the Deep
- Publisher: Apogee Software
- Designer: Tom Hall
- Programmers: John Carmack; John Romero
- Artist: Adrian Carmack
- Series: Commander Keen
- Platforms: MS-DOS; Microsoft Windows
- Release: December 14, 1990
- Genre: Side-scrolling platformer
- Mode: Single-player

Commander Keen in Invasion of the Vorticons is a three-part episodic side-scrolling platform video game developed by Ideas from the Deep (a precursor to id Software) and published by Apogee Software in 1990 for MS-DOS. It is the first set of episodes of the Commander Keen series. The game follows the titular Commander Keen, an eight-year-old child genius, as he retrieves the stolen parts of his spaceship from the cities of Mars, prevents a recently arrived alien mothership from destroying landmarks on Earth, and hunts down the leader of the aliens, the Grand Intellect, on the alien home planet. The three episodes feature Keen running, jumping, and shooting through various levels while opposed by aliens, robots, and other hazards.

In September 1990, John Carmack, while working at programming studio Softdisk, developed a way to implement smooth side-scrolling in video games on IBM-compatible personal computers (PCs), which at the time was the province of video game consoles or more game-focused home computers like the Commodore 64. Carmack and his coworkers John Romero and Tom Hall, along with Jay Wilbur and Lane Roathe, developed a demo of a PC version of Super Mario Bros. 3, but failed to convince Nintendo to invest in a PC port of their game. Soon afterwards, however, they were approached by Scott Miller of Apogee Software to develop an original game to be published through the Apogee shareware model. Hall designed the three-part game, John Carmack and Romero programmed it, Wilbur managed the team, and artist Adrian Carmack helped later in development. The team worked continuously for almost three months on the game, working late into the night at the office at Softdisk and taking their work computers to John Carmack's home to continue developing it.

Released by Apogee in December 1990, the trilogy of episodes was an immediate success. Apogee, whose monthly sales had been around US$7,000, made US$30,000 on Commander Keen alone in the first two weeks and US$60,000 per month by June. The first royalty check convinced the development team, then known as Ideas from the Deep, to quit their jobs at Softdisk. The team founded id Software shortly thereafter and went on to produce another four episodes of the Commander Keen series over the next year. The trilogy was lauded by reviewers due to the graphical achievement and humorous style, and id Software went on to develop other successful games, including Wolfenstein 3D (1992) and Doom (1993). The Vorticons trilogy has been released as part of several collections by id and Apogee since its first release, and has been sold for modern computers through Steam since 2007.

== Gameplay ==
Gameplay image from "Marooned on Mars". Commander Keen is shooting a Martian Garg enemy, while a Yorp is on the left side of the screen. Also present are red lollipop items.

The three episodes of Commander Keen in Invasion of the Vorticons make up one side-scrolling platform video game: most of the game features the player-controlled Commander Keen viewed from the side while moving on a two-dimensional plane. Keen can move left and right and can jump; after finding a pogo stick in the first episode, he can also bounce continuously and jump higher than he can normally with the correct timing. The levels are composed of platforms on which Keen can stand, and some platforms allow Keen to jump up through them from below. The second episode introduces moving platforms as well as switches that extend bridges over gaps in the floor. Once entered, the only way to exit a level is to reach the end, and the player cannot save and return to the middle of a level. In between levels, Keen travels on a two-dimensional map, viewed from above; from the map the player can enter levels by moving Keen to the entrance or save their progress in the game. Some levels are optional and can be bypassed, while others are secret and can only be reached by following specific procedures.

Each of the three episodes contain a different set of enemies in their levels, which Keen must kill or avoid. The first episode includes Martians, the second largely uses robots, and the third more species of aliens. All three episodes also include Vorticons, large blue canine-like aliens. Levels can also include hazards like electricity or spikes. Touching a hazard or most enemies causes Keen to lose a life, and the game is ended if all of Keen's lives are lost. After finding a raygun in the first episode, Keen can shoot at enemies using ammunition found throughout the game; different enemies take differing numbers of shots to kill, or in some cases are immune. Some enemies can also be stunned if they are jumped on, such as the one-eyed Yorps, which block Keen's path but do not harm him. Keen can find food items throughout the levels which grant points, with an extra life awarded every 20,000 points. There are also colored keycards that grant access to locked parts of levels, and in the third episode on rare occasions an ankh, which gives Keen temporary invulnerability.

== Plot ==
The game is broken up into three episodes: "Marooned on Mars", "The Earth Explodes", and "Keen Must Die!". In the first episode, eight-year-old child genius Billy Blaze builds a spaceship and puts on his older brother's football helmet to become Commander Keen. One night while his parents are out of the house, he flies to Mars to explore, but while he is away from the ship the Vorticons steal four vital components and hide them in Martian cities. Keen journeys through Martian cities and outposts to find the components, despite the efforts of Martians and robots to stop him. After securing the final component, which is guarded by a Vorticon, Keen returns to Earth—discovering a Vorticon mothership in orbit—and beats his parents home, who discover that he now has a pet Yorp.

In the second episode, the Vorticon mothership has locked its X-14 Tantalus Ray cannons on eight of Earth's landmarks, and Keen journeys to the ship to find and deactivate each of the cannons. Keen does so by overcoming more varied enemies and hazards and Vorticons at each cannon's control. At the end of the episode, he discovers that the Vorticons are being mind-controlled by the mysterious Grand Intellect, who is actually behind the attack on Earth.

In the third episode, Keen journeys to the Vorticon homeworld of Vorticon VI to find the Grand Intellect. He travels through Vorticon cities and outposts to gain access to the Grand Intellect's lair, fighting mostly against the Vorticons themselves. Upon reaching the lair, he discovers that the Grand Intellect is actually his school rival Mortimer McMire, whose IQ is "a single point higher" than Keen's. Keen defeats Mortimer and his "Mangling Machine" and frees the Vorticons from mind-control; the Vorticon king and "the other Vorticons you haven't slaughtered" then award him a medal for saving them.

== Development ==
=== Genesis ===
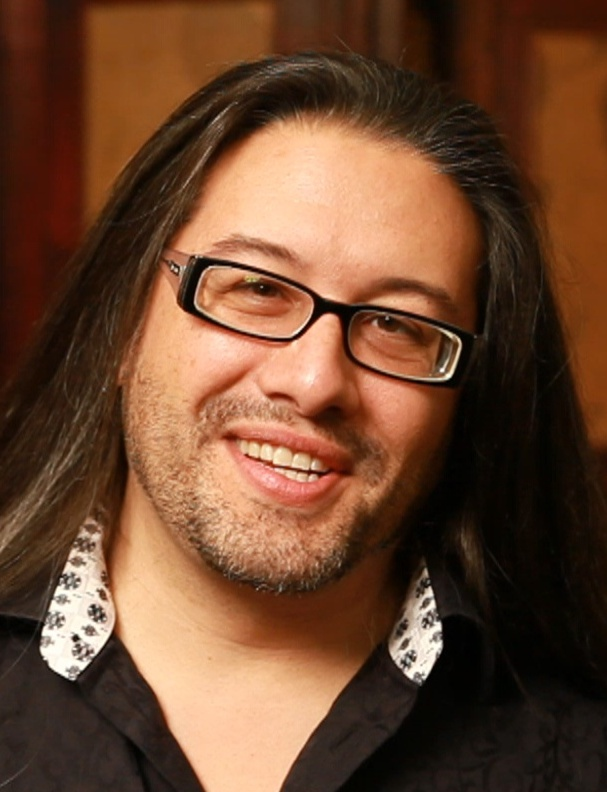
John Romero in 2012

In September 1990, John Carmack, a game programmer for the Gamer's Edge video game subscription service and disk magazine at Softdisk in Shreveport, Louisiana, with the aid of a copy of Michael Abrash's Power Graphics Programming, developed from scratch a way to create graphics which could smoothly scroll in any direction in a computer game. At the time, IBM-compatible general-purpose computers were not able to replicate the common feat of home computers like the Commodore 64 or video game consoles such as the Nintendo Entertainment System, that of redrawing the entire screen fast enough for a smooth side-scrolling video game due to their specialized hardware. Carmack, rejecting the "clever little shortcuts" that other programmers had attempted to solve the problem, created adaptive tile refresh: a way to slide the majority of the visible screen to the side both horizontally and vertically when the player character moved as if it had not changed, and only redraw the newly visible portions of the screen. Other scrolling computer games had previously redrawn the whole screen in chunks, or like Carmack's earlier games were limited to scrolling in one direction. He discussed the idea with coworker Tom Hall, who encouraged him to demonstrate it by recreating the first level of the recently released Super Mario Bros. 3 on a computer.

The pair did so in a single overnight session, with Hall recreating the graphics of the game—replacing the player character of Mario with Dangerous Dave, a character from an eponymous previous Gamer's Edge game—while Carmack optimized the code. The next morning, September 20, Carmack and Hall showed the resulting game, Dangerous Dave in Copyright Infringement, to another coworker, John Romero. Romero recognized Carmack's programming feat as a major accomplishment: Nintendo was one of the most successful companies in Japan, largely due to the success of their Mario franchise, and the ability to replicate the gameplay of the series on a computer could have large implications. The scrolling technique did not meet Softdisk's coding guidelines as it needed at least a 16-color EGA graphics processor, and the programmers in the office who did not work on games were not as impressed as Romero.

Romero felt that the potential of Carmack's idea should not be "wasted" on Softdisk; while the other members of the Gamer's Edge team more or less agreed, he especially felt that their talents in general were wasted on the company, which needed the money their games brought in but in his opinion neither understood nor appreciated video game design as distinct from general software programming. The manager of the team, fellow programmer Jay Wilbur, recommended that they take the demo to Nintendo itself to position themselves as capable of building a PC version of Super Mario Bros. for the company. The group—composed of Carmack, Romero, Hall, Wilbur, and Gamer's Edge editor Lane Roathe—decided to build a full demo game to send to Nintendo. As they lacked the computers to build the project at home and could not work on it at Softdisk, they "borrowed" their work computers over the weekend, taking them in their cars to a house shared by Carmack, Wilbur, and Roathe. The group then spent the next 72 hours working non-stop on the demo, which copied Super Mario Bros. 3 with some shortcuts taken in the artwork, sound, and level design, and a title screen that credited the game to the programmers under the name Ideas from the Deep, a name Romero had used for some prior Softdisk projects. The response from Nintendo a few weeks later was not as hoped for: while Nintendo was impressed with their efforts, they wanted the Mario series to remain exclusive to Nintendo consoles.

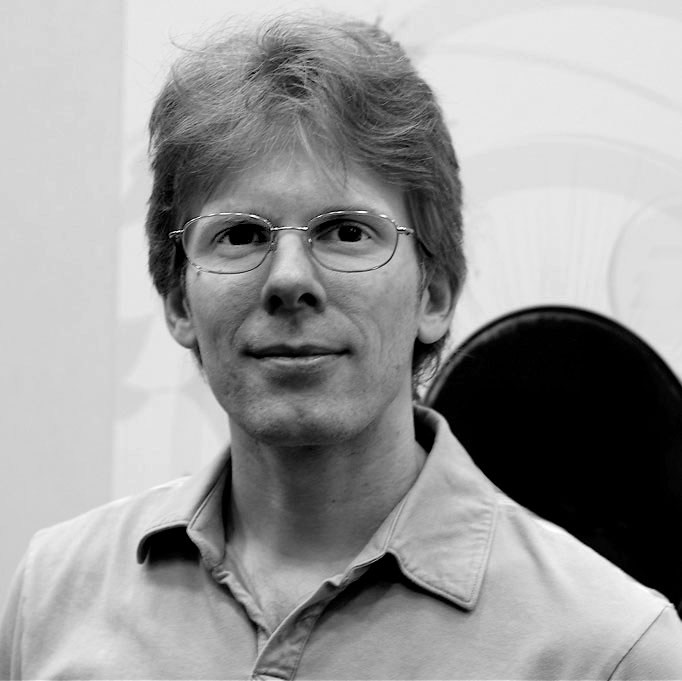
John Carmack in 2006

Around the same time the group was rejected by Nintendo, Romero was receiving fan mail about some of the games he had developed for Gamer's Edge. Upon realizing that all the letters came from different people but shared the same address—that of Scott Miller of Apogee Software—he wrote back an angry reply, only to receive a phone call from Miller soon after. Miller explained that he was trying to get in contact with Romero unofficially, as he expected that Softdisk would screen his mail to him at the company. He wanted to convince Romero to publish more levels for his previous Pyramids of Egypt—an adventure game in which the player navigates mazes while avoiding Egyptian-themed traps and monsters—through Apogee's shareware model. Miller was pioneering a model of game publishing in which part of a game would be released for free, with the remainder of the game available for purchase from Apogee. Romero said he could not, as Pyramids of Egypt was owned by Softdisk, but that it did not matter as the game he was now working on was much better.

Romero sent Miller the Mario demo, and the two agreed that Ideas from the Deep would create a new game for Apogee. The group negotiated that Miller would front them money for the development costs, which Miller later claimed was all the money Apogee had. Miller sent the group a US$2,000 (~$4,929 in 2025) advance in return for an agreement that they would create a game before Christmas of 1990, only a few months away. This advance was the team's entire budget for development. The game was planned to be split into three parts to match Apogee's shareware model.

=== Creation ===
Ideas from the Deep convened to come up with the design for the game, and Hall suggested a console-style platformer in the vein of Super Mario Bros., as they had the technology made for it; he further recommended a science fiction theme. John Carmack added the idea of a genius child protagonist saving the world, and Hall quickly created a short summary for the game: a dramatic introduction about eight-year-old genius Billy Blaze, defending the Earth with his spaceship. When he read out the summary in an over-dramatic voice to the group, they laughed and applauded, and the group agreed to begin work on Commander Keen in the Invasion of the Vorticons.

Billy Blaze, eight-year-old genius, working diligently in his backyard clubhouse has created an interstellar starship from old soup cans, rubber cement and plastic tubing. While his folks are out on the town and the babysitter has fallen asleep, Billy travels into his backyard workshop, dons his brother's football helmet, and transforms into ...

COMMANDER KEEN—defender of Earth!

In his ship, the Bean-with-Bacon Megarocket, Keen dispenses galactic justice with an iron hand!

— The original concept for Commander Keen, used in the introduction of "Marooned on Mars".

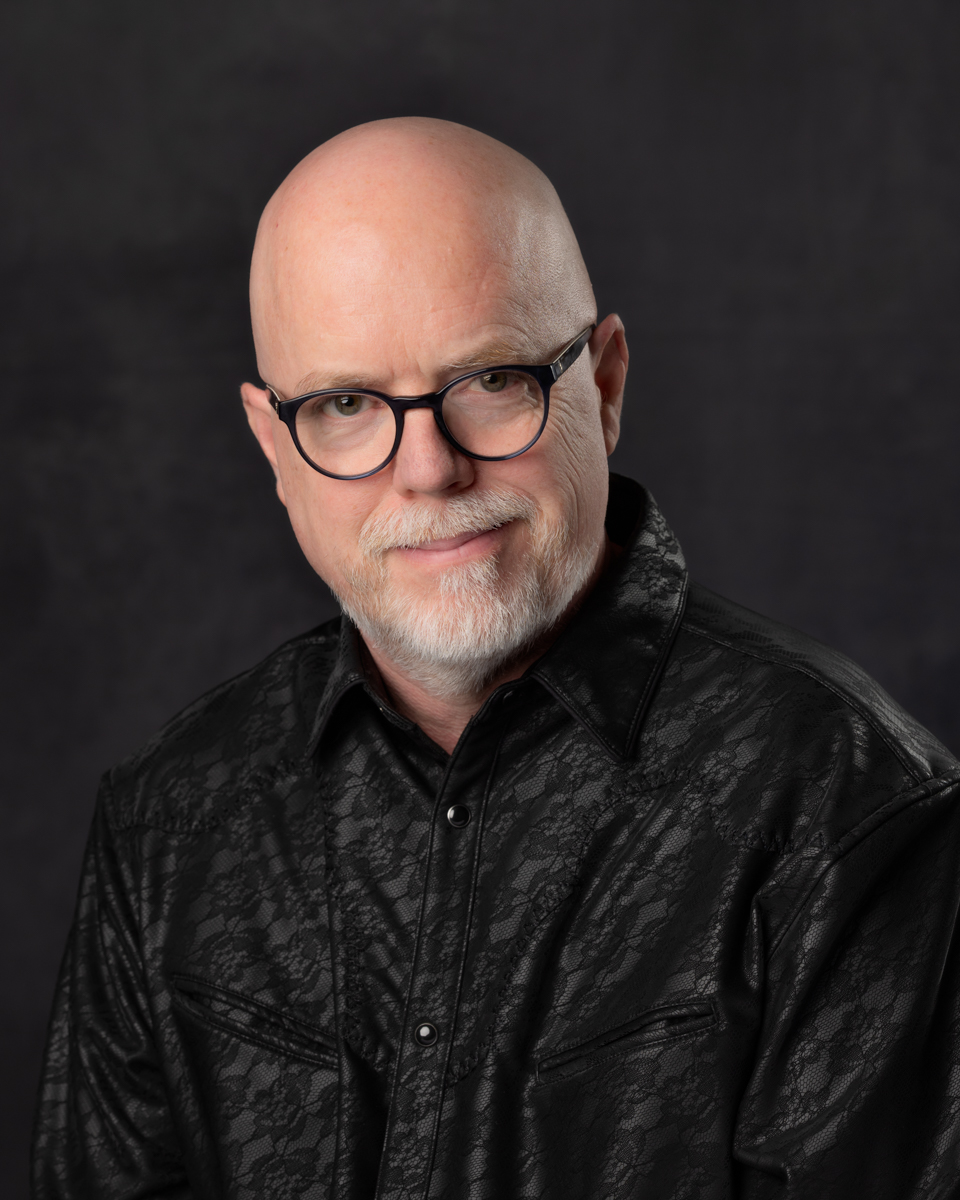
Tom Hall in 2023

The Ideas from the Deep team, who referred to themselves as the "IFD guys", could not afford to leave their jobs to work on the game full-time, so they continued to work at Softdisk making Gamer's Edge games during the day while working on Commander Keen at night. They also continued to take home their work computers to Carmack's house on the weekends, putting them in their cars at night and bringing them back in the morning before anyone else arrived; they even began to request upgrades to the computers from Softdisk, nominally for their work. The group split into different roles: Hall became the game designer and creative director, John Carmack and Romero were the programmers, and Wilbur the manager. They invited artist Adrian Carmack from Softdisk to join them late in development, while Roathe was soon kicked out of the group; Romero, the self-appointed leader of the team, liked him but felt that his work ethic did not match well with the rest of the team and pushed for his removal. Ideas from the Deep spent nearly every waking moment when they were not working at Softdisk from October through December 1990 working on Commander Keen, with Wilbur forcing them to eat and take breaks. Several members of the team have mentioned in interviews as an example of the team's commitment a night during development when a heavy storm flooded the path to get to the house, preventing them from working, and John Romero waded through a flooding river to make it to the house anyway.

As the principal designer, Hall's personal experiences and philosophies strongly impacted the game: Keen's red shoes and Green Bay Packers football helmet were items Hall wore as a child, dead enemies left behind corpses due to his belief that child players should be taught that death had permanent consequences, and enemies were based loosely on his reading of Sigmund Freud's psychological theories, such as that of the id. Other influences on Hall for the game were Duck Dodgers in the 24½th Century (1953) and other Chuck Jones cartoons, and "The Available Data on the Worp Reaction", a 1953 short story by Lion Miller about a child constructing a spaceship. Keen's "Bean-with-Bacon" spaceship was taken from a George Carlin skit about using bay leaves as deodorant so as to smell like soup. Keen was intended to be a reflection of Hall as he had wanted to be as a child. The team separated the game from its Super Mario Bros. roots by adding non-linear exploration and additional mechanics like the pogo stick. A suggestion from Miller that part of the popularity of Super Mario Bros. was the presence of secrets and hidden areas in the game led Hall to add several secrets, such as an entire hidden level in the first episode, and a "Galactic Alphabet" in which signs in the game were written, which if deciphered by the players revealed hidden messages, jokes, and instructions. The level maps were designed using a custom-made program called Tile Editor (TEd), which was first created for Dangerous Dave and was used for the entire Keen series as well as several other games. To maintain the mood of the game's storyline and entice players to play the next episode, the team incorporated cliffhangers between each part of the trilogy.

As the game neared completion, Miller began to market the game to players. Strongly encouraged by the updates the team was sending him, he began heavily advertising the game in all the bulletin board systems (BBS) and game magazines he had access to, as well as sending the team US$100 checks every week labelled "pizza bonus" after one of the game's food items to keep them motivated. The game was completed in early December 1990, and on the afternoon of December 14, Miller began uploading the completed first episode to BBSs, with the other two episodes listed as available for purchase as a mailed plastic bag with floppy disks for US$30.

== Reception ==
Commander Keen was an immediate hit for Apogee: the company's previous sales levels had been around US$7,000 per month, but by Christmas Keen already had sales of almost US$30,000 (~$61,409 in 2024). Miller described the game as "a little atom bomb" to magazine editors and BBS controllers when asked about it; its success led him to recruit his mother and hire his first employee to handle sales and phone calls from interested players, and to quit his other job and move Apogee from his house into an office. By June 1991, the game was bringing in over US$60,000 per month; in 1995 the team estimated that the game had made US$300,000 to $400,000. Chris Parker of PC Magazine later in 1991 referred to the game's release as a "tremendous success". Apogee announced plans to license the game to another publisher for a Nintendo Entertainment System port in an advertising flyer that year, but no such version was ever created. Scott Miller estimated in 2009 that the trilogy eventually sold between 50,000 and 60,000 copies.

A contemporary review by Barry Simon of PC Magazine praised the game's graphical capabilities as having a "Nintendo feel", though he termed the graphics as "well drawn" but "not spectacular" in terms of resolution. He noted that the game was very much an arcade game that players would not purchase for "its scintillating plot or ground-breaking originality", but said that all three episodes were very fun to play and that the scrolling graphics set it apart from similar games. A short summary of the trilogy in 1992 in PC World termed it "one of the most spectacular games available" and praised the "superb" sound and graphics, while a similar summary in CQ Amateur Radio described it as "Nintendo comes to the PC" and the "best action/adventure game" the reviewer had ever seen. In October 1992, the Shareware Industry Awards gave the Commander Keen series the "Best Entertainment Software and Best Overall" award. A review of the entire Commander Keen series in 1993 by Sandy Petersen in the first "Eye of the Monitor" column for Dragon described the series as action games with "hilarious graphics". Acknowledging its debt to Super Mario Bros., he called it, including the Vorticon trilogy, "one of the best games of its type" and praised it for not being "mindlessly hard", though still requiring some thought to play through, and especially for the humor in the graphics and gameplay.

== Legacy ==
Ideas from the Deep's first royalty check from Apogee in January 1991 for US$10,500 convinced them that they no longer needed their day jobs at Softdisk but could devote themselves full-time to their own ideas. Hall and Wilbur were concerned about the risk of being sued if they did not break the news gently to Softdisk, but Romero and John Carmack were dismissive of the possibility, especially as they felt they had no assets for which they could be sued. Shortly thereafter, John Carmack was confronted by their boss, Softdisk owner Al Vekovius, who had become suspicious of the group's increasingly erratic, disinterested, and surly behavior at work, as well as their multiple requests for computer upgrades. Vekovius had been told by another employee that the group were making their own games, and he felt that Carmack was generally incapable of lying. Carmack in turn bluntly admitted that they had made Keen with Softdisk computers, that they felt no remorse for their actions, and that they were all planning on leaving. Vekovius felt that the company was reliant on the Gamer's Edge subscriptions and tried to convince the group to instead form a new company in partnership with Softdisk; when Ideas from the Deep made no secret of the offer in the office, the other employees threatened to all quit if the team was "rewarded" for stealing from the company. After several weeks of negotiation, the Ideas team agreed to produce a series of games for Softdisk, one every two months, and on February 1, founded id Software.

In the 2017 History of Digital Games, author Andrew Williams claims that Vorticons "signaled a new direction for computer games in general", as well as setting a tone of gameplay mechanics for future id games, by introducing a sense of "effortless movement" as players explored through large open spaces instead of disconnected screens like prior platforming computer games. In the summer of 1991, id hosted a seminar for game developers with the intention of licensing the Commander Keen engine; they did so, forming the spiritual predecessor to both QuakeCon and id's standard of licensing their game engines. Id Software also produced several more games in the Commander Keen series; the first of these, Commander Keen in Keen Dreams, was published in 1991 through their agreement with Softdisk. Commander Keen in Goodbye, Galaxy, composed of the episodes "Secret of the Oracle" and "The Armageddon Machine", was published through Apogee in December 1991, and the final id-developed Keen game, Commander Keen in Aliens Ate My Babysitter, was published through FormGen around the same time. Another trilogy of episodes, titled The Universe Is Toast!, was planned for December 1992, but was cancelled after the success of id's Wolfenstein 3D and development focus on Doom. A final Keen game, Commander Keen, was developed for the Game Boy Color in 2001 by David A. Palmer Productions in association with id Software, and published by Activision.

The original trilogy has been released as part of several collections since its first release: the id Anthology compilation in 1996, a compilation release by Apogee in 1998 of Invasion of the Vorticons and Goodbye, Galaxy, a similar compilation in 2001 by 3D Realms titled Commander Keen Combo CD, and the 3D Realms Anthology in 2014. They have also been released for modern computers through a DOS emulator, and sold through Steam since 2007 as a part of the Commander Keen Complete Pack.

== Sources ==
- Kushner, David (2004). Masters of Doom: How Two Guys Created an Empire and Transformed Pop Culture. Random House. ISBN 978-0-8129-7215-3.
- Williams, Andrew (2017). History of Digital Games: Developments in Art, Design and Interaction. CRC Press. ISBN 978-1-317-50381-1.
