= Commander Keen =

Video game series by id Software

- Genre: Side-scrolling platformer
- Developers: id Software (Episodes 1–6); David A. Palmer Productions (2001 GBC game)
- Publishers: 3D Realms (formerly Apogee Software) (Episodes 1–5); Softdisk (Episode 3.5); FormGen (Episode 6); Activision (2001 GBC game)
- Creators: Tom Hall; John Carmack; John Romero
- Artist: Adrian Carmack
- Composer: Robert Prince
- Platforms: MS-DOS, Game Boy Color, SteamOS, Microsoft Windows, Nintendo Switch, Android, iOS
- First release: Commander Keen in Invasion of the Vorticons; December 14, 1990
- Latest release: Commander Keen; May 30, 2001

Commander Keen is a series of side-scrolling platform video games developed primarily by id Software. The series consists of six main episodes, a "lost" episode, and a final game; all but the final game were released for MS-DOS in 1990 and 1991, while the 2001 Commander Keen was released for the Game Boy Color. The series follows the eponymous Commander Keen, the secret identity of the eight-year-old genius Billy Blaze, as he defends the Earth and the galaxy from alien threats with his homemade spaceship, rayguns, and pogo stick.

The first three episodes were developed by Ideas from the Deep, the precursor to id, and published by Apogee Software as the shareware title Commander Keen in Invasion of the Vorticons; the "lost" episode 3.5 Commander Keen in Keen Dreams was developed by id and published as a retail title by Softdisk; episodes four and five were released by Apogee as the shareware Commander Keen in Goodbye, Galaxy; and the simultaneously developed episode six was published in retail by FormGen as Commander Keen in Aliens Ate My Babysitter. Ten years later, an homage and sequel to the series was developed by David A. Palmer Productions and published by Activision as Commander Keen. Another game was announced in 2019 as under development by ZeniMax Online Studios, but was not released.

Invasion of the Vorticons was the only game developed by Ideas from the Deep, and was based on programmer John Carmack's creation of adaptive tile refresh, a technique that allowed IBM-compatible general-purpose computers to replicate the smooth scrolling of video game consoles such as the Nintendo Entertainment System. The game's success caused designer Tom Hall, programmers John Carmack and John Romero, and artist Adrian Carmack to found id Software. Their obligations to Softdisk, where they had worked during development of the game, led to the creation of Keen Dreams as a prototype for the second trilogy of episodes. The final episode was split off during development into a stand-alone retail title, and plans for a third trilogy were cancelled after the success of Wolfenstein 3D (1992) and development focus on 3D first-person shooters such as Doom (1993). The final Keen game ten years later had oversight but little development work from id.

Critical reception and the series' legacy has focused on the two main trilogies of episodes, with Vorticons having large success as a shareware game and impacting the success of Apogee (now 3D Realms) and its shareware model. The second trilogy sold fewer copies, which was blamed by id and Apogee on its split into two parts, and the 2001 game received mixed reviews. The MS-DOS games have been re-released in several compilation packages, and all but the sixth episode are still sold through modern emulation releases on platforms such as Steam. References to the series have been made by dozens of other games, especially to the Dopefish, an enemy in the fourth episode, which has been termed one of the video game industry's biggest in-jokes. An active modding community has grown around the series, producing editing tools and unofficial sequels.

== Titles ==
=== Games ===
- Commander Keen in Invasion of the Vorticons is the first game in the series, released on December 14, 1990, for MS-DOS. It is divided into three episodes: "Marooned on Mars", "The Earth Explodes", and "Keen Must Die!", and the game was published through a shareware model whereby "Marooned on Mars" was released for free, and the other two episodes were available for purchase. It was developed by a team calling themselves Ideas from the Deep (or sometimes IFD Software), consisting of programmers John Carmack and John Romero, designer Tom Hall, artist Adrian Carmack, and manager Jay Wilbur, and published by Apogee Software. The game, like the rest of the series, is a side-scrolling platform video game.
- Commander Keen in Keen Dreams is the second game of the series, released in 1991 as a single episode; it is sometimes referred to as episode 3.5 of the series. It was developed for MS-DOS by id Software, which had been founded by the Ideas from the Deep team after the success of the first game, and published through Softdisk as part of an agreement between the companies as the founders of id had been employees of Softdisk when they developed Vorticons. Id used the game, which stands outside of the general continuity of the series as a "dream" episode, as a prototype to test ideas they wanted to use in future games, such as a more advanced art style, parallax scrolling, and gameplay changes. In 2013 a port was developed by Super Fighter Team for Android devices, and a 2014 Indiegogo crowdfunding campaign led to the original source code being released under GNU GPL-2.0-or-later and a release by Hard Disk Publishing through Steam for Microsoft Windows and Linux in 2015, and OS X in 2016. A Nintendo Switch version was released by Lone Wolf Technology in 2019.
- Commander Keen in Goodbye, Galaxy was released for MS-DOS on December 15, 1991, as the second main game in the series. Consisting of episodes four and five of the series, "Secret of the Oracle" and "The Armageddon Machine", it was developed by id and published through Apogee. Like the first trilogy of episodes, "Secret of the Oracle" was released for free, and the other episode sold by Apogee. The game incorporates a more polished version of the graphical updates in Keen Dreams, along with further gameplay changes and additions.
- Commander Keen in Aliens Ate My Babysitter is the final id-developed game, released in December 1991 for MS-DOS. Originally planned to be the third episode of Goodbye, Galaxy and sixth episode overall, it was changed before development began to be a stand-alone game published as a retail title through FormGen. Due to differing timelines between FormGen and Apogee, despite being numbered as the sixth episode it was developed in between the fourth and fifth; it also features a modified engine from Goodbye, Galaxy.
- Commander Keen was released on May 29, 2001, for the Game Boy Color. Developed by David A. Palmer Productions and published by Activision, it was created as both a sequel and homage to the series as a whole, and does not have an episode number. Id was not a major partner in development, though it retained editorial control over the game, and Adrian Carmack contributed some artwork. The idea for a Game Boy Color Keen game came from John Carmack and id, who approached Activision, which in turn proposed Palmer as the developer.

=== Cancelled and compilation releases ===
After the release of Goodbye, Galaxy and Aliens Ate My Babysitter in 1991, id Software planned to make a third set of episodes for the following December, titled Commander Keen in The Universe is Toast!. Beyond the proposed title and release date, shown in the epilogue of the two games, no design work was completed before the game was cancelled due to the success of id's Wolfenstein 3D (1992) and development focus on 3D first-person shooters such as Doom (1993). John Carmack noted in 1999, when referencing the project that became the Game Boy Color game, that the original developers of Keen were unlikely to ever work together again on another game.

In June 2019, at Bethesda's E3 conference for iOS and Android devices, a new game in the series was announced, again titled Commander Keen. Under development by ZeniMax Online Studios, the mobile game was said to include tactical strategy elements and have both single-player and multiplayer gameplay, and star Keen's twin son and daughter, Billy and Billie. It was planned for release in the summer of the same year, but no release or further announcements were made, and all references to the game were removed from Bethesda and ZeniMax websites by June 2020.

In addition to the initial releases of the games, several compilation releases have been published: the id Anthology compilation in 1996, which includes all seven episodes developed by id or Ideas from the Deep; a compilation release by Apogee in 1998 of the five episodes of Invasion of the Vorticons and Goodbye, Galaxy; and the 3D Realms Anthology in 2014, which also includes Vorticons and Galaxy. The Apogee-published episodes have also been released for modern computers through a DOS emulator, and sold through Steam since 2007 as the Commander Keen Complete Pack.

== Gameplay ==
Gameplay in "Secret of the Oracle". Both stunned and un-stunned enemies can be seen, as can dart traps, water droplets, and a yellow keycard gem.

All of the games in the Commander Keen series are side-scrolling platform video games: the majority of the game features the player-controlled Commander Keen viewed from the side while moving on a two-dimensional plane. The player can move left and right and can jump; in every episode besides Keen Dreams they can also use a pogo stick to bounce continuously and jump higher than they can normally with the correct timing. The levels are composed of platforms on which Keen can stand, and some platforms allow Keen to jump up through them from below. Beginning with episode two, "The Earth Explodes", there are also moving platforms as well as switches which extend bridges over gaps in the floor. Keen Dreams and later games add fireman's poles that Keen can climb up or down, and with the exception of the 2001 Commander Keen also show the platforms viewed from slightly above so as to give a pseudo-3D effect. Throughout the series, once entered, the only way to exit a level is to reach the end, though for Keen Dreams and episodes four through six the player can save and return to the middle of a level, rather than only between levels like the other games. In between levels the player travels on a two-dimensional map, viewed from above; from the map the player can enter levels by approaching the entrance. Some levels are optional and can be bypassed, while others are secret and can only be reached by following specific procedures.

The episodes all contain a different set of enemies in their levels, which the player must kill, stun, or avoid. These enemies are typically aliens or robots. Levels can also include hazards, such as electricity or spikes; touching a hazard or most enemies causes Keen to lose a life, and the game is ended if all of Keen's lives are lost. Invasion of the Vorticons features a raygun that Keen can use ammo for to kill enemies; Keen Dreams exchanges this for flower power pellets that temporarily stun enemies when thrown, episodes four through six use a stun gun that permanently stuns enemies, and the 2001 Commander Keen has a stun gun that temporarily stuns enemies unless they are then killed with a pogo jump. The player can also find food items throughout the levels which grant points, with an extra life awarded with enough points. There are also colored keycards which grant access to locked parts of levels, collectable items that award an extra life beginning with episode four, and items that grant an instant extra life.

== Plot ==
In the first episode, "Marooned on Mars", eight-year-old Billy Blaze, a child genius, builds a spaceship (the "Beans with Bacon Megarocket") and puts on his older brother's football helmet to become Commander Keen. One night while his parents are out of the house he flies to Mars to explore; while away from the ship the Vorticons steal four vital components and hide them in Martian cities. Keen journeys through Martian cities and outposts to find the components, despite the efforts of Martians and robots; the final component is guarded by a Vorticon. Keen returns to Earth—discovering a Vorticon mothership in orbit—and beats his parents home. In "The Earth Explodes" he travels through the mothership and disables its weapons, at the end discovering that the Vorticons are being mind-controlled by the mysterious Grand Intellect, who is actually behind the attack on Earth. In "Keen Must Die" he fights through the cities and outposts of the Vorticon home planet to reach the Grand Intellect, who is revealed to be his school rival Mortimer McMire, who he then defeats.

In Keen Dreams, which is set outside of the main continuity, Keen falls asleep after dinner and wakes up in his pajamas in bed on top of a hill. After being told by potato soldiers that he is now the slave of King Boobus Toober, and being asked by another child to save them, he journeys through the vegetable-themed land to defeat the King, waking up in his bed at home afterwards.

The main series of games continues in "Secret of the Oracle", where Keen builds a faster-than-light radio and overhears plans by a race of aliens known as the Shikadi to destroy the galaxy. He flies off to the Oracle on the planet of Gnosticus IV, only to discover that the Gnosticenes that run the Oracle have been kidnapped by the Shikadi. Keen fights through the outposts and temples of the Shadowlands, rescuing the Gnosticenes, and the Oracle then tells Keen that the Shikadi are "shadow beings from the far side of the galaxy" who are building an Armageddon Machine at Korath III to blow up the galaxy and rebuild it as they wish afterwards.

In "The Armageddon Machine", Keen infiltrates the titular space station to disable it, destroying the subsystems of the machine located in each level. When he finishes, he finds that the "Gannalech" that was leading the Shikadi was the Grand Intellect McMire, who had escaped Keen in Vorticons by leaving behind an android in his place. A note left behind for Keen tells him that McMire plans to instead destroy the Universe. Aliens Ate My Babysitter is set around the same time, though it is unclear whether it is actually after the events of Goodbye, Galaxy; in it, the alien Bloogs of Fribbulus Xax kidnap Keen's babysitter and plan to eat her. Keen finds his way to her, and she reveals that she is McMire's sister, and that McMire was behind her kidnapping as a way to distract Keen while he plotted to destroy the universe. While the planned trilogy that would cover that plot, The Universe is Toast, was never developed, the Game Boy Color Commander Keen has a sub-space anomaly disrupting life on Earth as an effect of a plot by the Bloogs, Shikadi, and Droidicus, led by McMire, to destroy the universe. Keen fights his way through the three races' planets to find the plasma crystals powering the Omegamatic station, only for McMire to escape after taunting Keen a final time.

== Development ==
=== Invasion of the Vorticons ===
In September 1990, John Carmack, a game programmer for the Gamer's Edge video game subscription service and disk magazine at Softdisk in Shreveport, Louisiana, developed a way to create graphics which could smoothly scroll in any direction in a computer game. At the time, IBM-compatible general-purpose computers were not able to replicate the common feat of video game consoles such as the Nintendo Entertainment System, which were capable of redrawing the entire screen fast enough for a side-scrolling video game due to their specialized hardware. Carmack created adaptive tile refresh: a way to slide the majority of the visible screen to the side both horizontally and vertically when the player moved as if it had not changed, and only redraw the newly visible portions of the screen. Other games had previously redrawn the whole screen in chunks, or like Carmack's earlier games were limited to scrolling in one direction. He discussed the idea with coworker Tom Hall, who encouraged him to demonstrate it by recreating the first level of the recent Super Mario Bros. 3 on a computer. The pair did so in a single overnight session, with Hall recreating the graphics of the game—replacing the player character of Mario with Dangerous Dave, a character from an eponymous previous Gamer's Edge game—while Carmack optimized the code. The next morning on September 20, the resulting game, Dangerous Dave in Copyright Infringement, was shown to their other coworker John Romero. Romero recognized Carmack's idea as a major accomplishment: Nintendo was one of the most successful companies in Japan, largely due to the success of their Mario franchise, and the ability to replicate the gameplay of the series on a computer could have large implications.

Romero felt that the potential of Carmack's idea should not be "wasted" on Softdisk; while the other members of the Gamer's Edge team more or less agreed, he especially felt that their talents in general were wasted on the company, which needed the money their games brought in but in his opinion neither understood nor appreciated video game design as distinct from general software programming. The manager of the team and fellow programmer, Jay Wilbur, recommended that they take the demo to Nintendo itself, to position themselves as capable of building a PC version of Super Mario Bros. for the company. The group—composed of Carmack, Romero, Hall, and Wilbur, along with Lane Roathe, the editor for Gamer's Edge, decided to build a full demo game for their idea to send to Nintendo. As they lacked the computers to build the project at home, and could not work on it at Softdisk, they "borrowed" their work computers over the weekend, taking them in their cars to a house shared by Carmack, Wilbur, and Roathe, and made a copy of the first level of the game over the next 72 hours. They credited the game to Ideas from the Deep, a name Romero had previously used for some Softdisk projects. The response from Nintendo a few weeks later was not as hoped for, however; while Nintendo was impressed with their efforts, they wanted the Mario series to remain exclusive to Nintendo consoles.

Around the same time as the group was rejected by Nintendo, Romero was approached by Scott Miller of Apogee Software, who wanted him to publish more levels for his previous Pyramids of Egypt—an adventure game where the player navigates mazes while avoiding Egyptian-themed traps and monsters—through Apogee's shareware model. Miller was pioneering a model of game publishing where part of a game would be released for free, with the remainder of the game available for purchase from Apogee. Romero said he could not, as Pyramids of Egypt was owned by Softdisk, but that it did not matter as the game he was now working on was much better, and sent Miller the Mario demo. Miller was impressed, and the team agreed to create a new game for Apogee before Christmas of 1990—only a few months away—split into three parts to match Apogee's shareware model of giving away the first part for free to attract interest in the whole. Hall suggested a console-style platformer in the vein of Super Mario Bros., as they had the technology made for it; he further recommended a science fiction theme, and developed a short introduction that convinced the team to make Commander Keen in Invasion of the Vorticons.

Billy Blaze, eight-year-old genius, working diligently in his backyard clubhouse has created an interstellar starship from old soup cans, rubber cement and plastic tubing. While his folks are out on the town and the babysitter has fallen asleep, Billy travels into his backyard workshop, dons his brother's football helmet, and transforms into...

COMMANDER KEEN—defender of Earth!

In his ship, the Bean-with-Bacon Megarocket, Keen dispenses galactic justice with an iron hand!

— The original concept for Commander Keen, used in the introduction of "Marooned on Mars".

The Ideas from the Deep team could not afford to leave their jobs to work on the game full-time, so they continued to work at Softdisk, spending their time on the Gamer's Edge games during the day and on Commander Keen at night and weekends using Softdisk computers. The group split into different roles: Hall became the game designer and creative director, John Carmack and Romero were the programmers, and Wilbur the manager. They invited artist Adrian Carmack from Softdisk to join them late in development, while Roathe was soon removed from the group. Ideas from the Deep spent nearly every waking moment when they were not working at Softdisk from October through December 1990 working on Commander Keen, with Wilbur forcing them to eat and take breaks.

The game's design was largely driven by Tom Hall: Romero and especially John Carmack were focused almost exclusively on the programming; Wilbur was not involved in the game's design; and Adrian Carmack joined late in development and found the project's "cute" art style, till then mostly created by Hall, far-removed from his preferred, darker, style. Hall's personal experiences and philosophies, therefore, strongly impacted the game: Keen's red shoes and Green Bay Packers football helmet were items Hall wore as a child, dead enemies left behind corpses due to his belief that child players should be taught that death had permanent consequences, and enemies were based loosely on his reading of Sigmund Freud's psychological theories, such as that of the id. Other influences on Hall for the game were Duck Dodgers in the 24½th Century and other Chuck Jones cartoons, and "The Available Data on the Worp Reaction", a short story about a child constructing a spaceship. Keen's "Bean-with-Bacon" spaceship was taken from a George Carlin skit about using bay leaves as deodorant so as to smell like soup. Keen was intended to be a reflection of Hall as he had wanted to be as a child. The team separated the game from its Super Mario Bros. roots by adding non-linear exploration and additional mechanics like the pogo stick. A suggestion from Miller that part of the popularity of Super Mario Bros was the presence of secrets and hidden areas in the game led Hall to add several secrets, such as an entire hidden level in the first episode, and the "Galactic Alphabet". The level maps were designed using a custom-made program called Tile Editor (TEd), which was first created for Dangerous Dave and was used for the entire Keen series as well as several other games.

As the game neared completion, Miller began to market the game to players. Strongly encouraged by the updates the team was sending him, he began heavily advertising the game in all of the bulletin board systems (BBS) and game magazines he had access to. The game was completed in early December 1990, and on the afternoon of December 14 Miller began uploading the completed first episode to BBSs, with the other two episodes listed as available for purchase as a mailed plastic bag with floppy disks for US$30 (~$74 in 2025). After the arrival of the first royalty check from Apogee, the team planned to quit Softdisk and start their own company. When their boss and owner of Softdisk Al Vekovius confronted them on their plans, as well as their use of company resources to develop the game, the team made no secret of their intentions. Vekovius initially proposed a joint venture between the team and Softdisk, which fell apart when the other employees of the firm threatened to quit in response, and after a few weeks of negotiation the team agreed to produce a series of games for Gamer's Edge, one every two months.

=== Keen Dreams and Goodbye, Galaxy ===
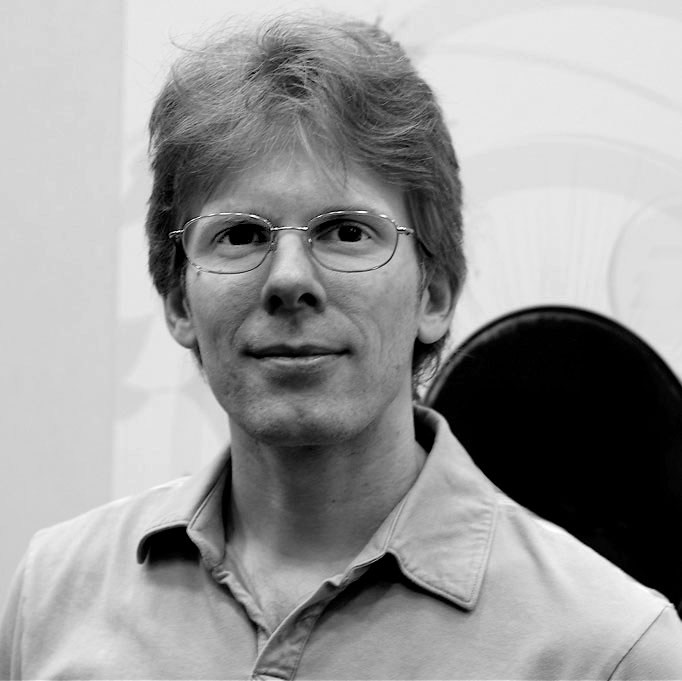
John Carmack in 2006

Ideas from the Deep, now founded as id Software, used some of these games to prototype ideas for their own games, including in late spring of 1991 Keen Dreams, which they used to develop new systems for their next set of major episodes of the series. They did not initially want to do a Keen game for Softdisk, but eventually decided that doing so would let them fulfill their obligations while also helping to improve the next full set of games for Apogee. The team reprised their roles from the first game, and prototyped an increase in graphical quality, a pseudo-3D view rather than a side-on view, ramps rather than solely flat surfaces, support for sound cards, and changes to the design based on player feedback. The game's plot, as a result, was designed to be a standalone game outside of the continuity of the main series, and not a true sequel. Once the game engine and design changes were completed, Keen Dreams was completed in less than a month even as the team simultaneously worked on another game.

Beginning development in the June 1991, the team again reprised their roles for Goodbye, Galaxy. Hall had received feedback from parents who did not like that the enemies in Vorticons left behind corpses instead of disappearing like in other games; he did not want the violence to have no effects, and so in Dreams had replaced the raygun with pellets that temporarily stunned enemies. He was not satisfied with this change, and while considering ways to remove Keen's parents during the introduction for Goodbye, Galaxy, came up with a stun gun which would leave behind permanently stunned enemies. Additionally, music, which was missing in prior Keen games, was added to Goodbye, Galaxy, composed by Bobby Prince. The game, episodes four though six, was intended to be published as a set named Goodbye, Galaxy in the same manner as the first one: released through Apogee, with episode four released for free in order to spur interest in purchasing the other two episodes. By August they had completed a beta version of episode four, "Secret of the Oracle", and Romero sent it off to a fan he had met from Canada, Mark Rein, who had offered to play-test the game. Romero was impressed with the list of bugs that Rein sent back, as well as with his business sense, and proposed bringing him in to the company as a probationary president for six months in order to help expand their business. Within a few weeks of being hired, Rein made a deal to get id into the commercial market: to take the sixth episode and make it a stand-alone game, published as a retail title through FormGen instead of part of a shareware trilogy. Id signed the deal, but Scott Miller of Apogee was dismayed; he felt that not having a full trilogy for the shareware game would hurt sales.

Also in August 1991, the team moved from Shreveport to Hall's hometown of Madison, Wisconsin, leaving behind Wilbur, who was unwilling to leave a stable job at Softdisk to fully join in with the startup, but picking up programmer Jason Blochowiak, who was working at the time at Softdisk. There, they worked on Goodbye, Galaxy, their remaining Softdisk games, and the now standalone Commander Keen in Aliens Ate My Babysitter between August and December. Despite being listed numerically as the sixth episode, due to it having a different publisher and schedule Aliens Ate My Babysitter was developed after "Secret of the Oracle" but before "The Armageddon Machine"; the fifth episode, however, was created within one month. Another trilogy of episodes, titled The Universe Is Toast, was planned for December 1992; id worked on it for a couple of weeks, before shifting focus to Wolfenstein 3D (1992). Hall proposed reviving the project after Wolfenstein was completed, but the team moved on to Doom (1993) instead. Id did not return to the series afterwards, instead continuing to focus on 3D first-person shooters.

=== Game Boy Color title ===
In October 1999 during an online question and answer session, John Carmack said that the original founders of id Software were unlikely to ever work together on a game again. Since the release of Goodbye, Galaxy, most of the team had left the company, with Hall leaving after Doom and Romero leaving after Quake (1996). He said, however, that he was considering the idea of making a Commander Keen game for the Game Boy Color handheld game console.

Activision formally announced at the start of May 2001 that a new Commander Keen game had been developed by David A. Palmer Productions, and would be released at the end of the month. An interview the following week with founder David A. Palmer explained that the original idea for the game came from id, who approached Activision to produce it; Activision in turn recommended Palmer as the developer for the project as they had been attempting to get an agreement with id and Activision for several years for his studio to make a Game Boy Color version of several of their games. While Palmer was the developer for the game, id collaborated with the studio, with id having approval over game design elements and artist Adrian Carmack making some tile artwork for the game.

== Reception ==
Commander Keen in Invasion of the Vorticons was an immediate hit for Apogee: the company's previous sales levels had been around US$7,000 per month, but by Christmas Keen already had sales of almost US$30,000. Miller described the game as "a little atom bomb" to magazine editors and BBS controllers when asked about it, and recruited his mother and hired his first employee to handle sales and phone calls from interested players. By June 1991, the game was bringing in over US$60,000 per month. Chris Parker of PC Magazine later in 1991 referred to the game's release as a "tremendous success". In 2009, Miller estimated the game's lifetime sales as between 50,000 and 60,000 units. A contemporary review by Barry Simon of PC Magazine praised the game's graphical capabilities as having a "Nintendo feel", though he termed the graphics as "well drawn" but "not spectacular" in terms of resolution. He noted that the game was very much an arcade game that players would not purchase for "its scintillating plot or ground-breaking originality", but said that all three episodes were very fun to play and that the scrolling graphics set it apart from similar games. A short summary of the trilogy in 1992 by PC World termed it "one of the most spectacular games available" and praised the "superb" sound and graphics, and a similar summary in CQ Amateur Radio described it as "Nintendo comes to the PC" and the "best action/adventure game" the reviewer had ever seen.

After its release in December 1991, Goodbye, Galaxy met with sales "about a third" of the original trilogy. Scott Miller of Apogee blamed the falling sales on the lack of a third episode, which he felt undercut the shareware model of the game. Tom Hall has also claimed that the split hurt the sales of the shareware episodes, though he has said that "they still did decently, though". PC Zone, in its first issue in 1993, quoted shareware distributors as saying Goodbye, Galaxy was one of the top shareware sellers of 1992, behind Wolfenstein 3D. IGN has also referred to the pair of episodes as "Apogee's hottest sellers". Hall has claimed "The Armageddon Machine" as the best Commander Keen episode and his favorite. Aliens Ate My Babysitter also did not sell as well as hoped for by id, which the team partially blamed on what they felt was terrible box art done by a company that had previously designed packaging for Lipton tea. Despite this, the sales were strong enough that id agreed to use FormGen as a retail publisher for at least two more games. PC Zone also stated that the sales of Aliens through shareware distributors was one of the highest in the shareware market in 1993.

In October 1992, the Shareware Industry Awards gave the Commander Keen series the "Best Entertainment Software and Best Overall" award. A review of the entire Commander Keen series in 1993 by Sandy Petersen in the first "Eye of the Monitor" column for Dragon described the series as action games with "hilarious graphics". Acknowledging its debt to Super Mario Bros., he called it, especially Goodbye, Galaxy, "one of the best games of its type" and praised it for not being "mindlessly hard", instead requiring some thought to play through, and especially for the humor in the graphics and gameplay. According to Steam Spy, as of June 2016 there are approximately 200,000 owners of the 2007 Commander Keen Complete Pack on Steam, and approximately 80,000 owners of the Keen Dreams release.

The 2001 Commander Keen received mixed reviews from critics. The graphics were both praised and criticized; reviewers praised the art style and the "bright and colorful" graphics, but disparaged the "busy" backgrounds and lackluster animations as making the game feel "choppy", and complained that the graphical updates did not reflect the ten years since the last releases. The gameplay similarly received mixed opinions; reviewers were split between praising the difficult, "old school" gameplay as a successful adaptation of the originals and dismissing the "aging" gameplay as sound but not comparing well to more recent games. Reviewers concluded that the game was an "acquired taste" best suited for fans of the original series or younger players.

== Legacy ==
Ideas from the Deep's first royalty check from Apogee in January 1991 convinced them that they no longer needed their day jobs at Softdisk but could devote themselves full-time to their own ideas, leading to the founding of id Software in February. In the summer of 1991, id hosted a seminar for game developers with the intention of licensing the Commander Keen engine; they did so, forming the spiritual predecessor to both QuakeCon and id's standard of licensing their game engines.

The Dopefish, burping, as seen in the level in which it appears in "Secret of the Oracle"

One of the enemies created for "Secret of the Oracle", the Dopefish, has since the game's release become one of the video game industry's biggest in-jokes, making cameo appearances in other games. The Dopefish, which Hall describes as "just a stupid green fish", is described in "Secret of the Oracle" as "the second-dumbest creature in the universe". It has appeared in dozens of other games since its initial appearance, as references, images, or the phrase "Dopefish Lives".

The Standard Galactic Alphabet, a writing system used to depict alien languages in the galaxy throughout the series, is used for textual signs and directions and was created by Tom Hall beginning with Invasion of the Vorticons as a way to pass hidden messages to players. It is a substitution cipher to the Latin alphabet, including the letters A–Z, opening and closing quotation marks, and a full stop. In 2019, it was added to the Under-ConScript Unicode Registry (availing of Unicode's Private Use Areas facility), using the codepoints U+EB40 (STANDARD GALACTIC LETTER A) to U+EB5F (STANDARD GALACTIC FULL STOP), and is included in the GNU Unifont CSUR extension. The Standard Galactic Alphabet also appears in the game Minecraft as the script and symbols used for its Enchanting Table.

Transliteration found in Aliens Ate My Babysitter Top: Standard Galactic Alphabet artificial script Bottom: Latin script

In January 2018, John Romero and Tom Hall stated on Twitter that Billy Blaze is the grandson of Wolfenstein protagonist William "B.J." Blazkowicz and the grandfather of Doomguy from Doom. Commander Keen himself has appeared or has been referenced in many other video games over the years, including Doom II, Duke Nukem, Bio Menace and Doom (2016).

A number of fan-made Commander Keen games have been created since the publication of the original titles, with a fan website, the Public Commander Keen Forum, devoted to their creation, announcement, and discussion. Since the release of utilities to modify the levels and graphics in the original Keen series in 2002, more than fifty mods have been made, most of which feature Commander Keen as the protagonist. These mods include "Commander Genius", an engine, released for multiple platforms, which interprets the episodes as a "retro-evolved" game, with re-polished graphics, a multiplayer compatibility, and a level editor, ports and remakes on different platforms, and The Universe Is Toast! mod, an unofficial sequel trilogy of games.

In January 2013, Tom Hall began development of Worlds of Wander, a tool for creating platform games, and the following month began a Kickstarter campaign for the tool and associated game, Secret Spaceship Club, which he described as a spiritual successor to Commander Keen. The project was unsuccessful in reaching its goal, though Hall said that he planned to continue working on it in his spare time.

== Sources ==
- Kushner, David (May 11, 2004). Masters of Doom: How Two Guys Created an Empire and Transformed Pop Culture. Random House. ISBN 978-0-8129-7215-3.
