= Restaurant Dash with Gordon Ramsay =

2016 video game

- Developer: Glu Mobile
- Designer: Tom Hall
- Platforms: Android; iOS
- Release: June 27, 2016
- Genre: Simulation
- Mode: Single-player

Restaurant Dash with Gordon Ramsay was a 2016 simulation video game developed by PlayFirst and published by Glu Mobile for Android and iOS. A spin-off of Diner Dash featuring voice work by celebrity chef Gordon Ramsay, it is the final game to be designed by id Software veteran Tom Hall. As of October 30, 2023, the game has now been sunset and only offline gameplay is currently available.

== Gameplay ==
Players customize their own kitchen, create their own chef avatar, cook meals, serve guests work towards building their own restaurant empire and earn ‘Wichelin’ stars. This can be accomplished by cooking different recipes and dueling with other chefs. Players will also hear Ramsay's signature banter and cursing throughout the game. Use earned currency to make upgrades to things like kitchen equipment, quality ingredients, or the chef's outfit. Different kitchen locations are unlocked as players progress through the game.

== Critical reception ==
Wired wrote "If you enjoy Hell's Kitchen or Master Chef, having Ramsay's constant banter in the game really does enhance the experience. If you're used to playing mobile games with the sound turned off, you're missing out. Pulling off a well-coordinated service is rewarding in and of itself, but hearing "That was [*bleep*] stunning" afterwards is just hilarious."

The Irish Times said "If you’re hoping for Ramsay at his fiery, sweary best (worst?) this may not be quite what you were expecting. But as a commute distraction, it beats tackling the same level of Candy Crush."
