= Tom Hall =

American video game designer

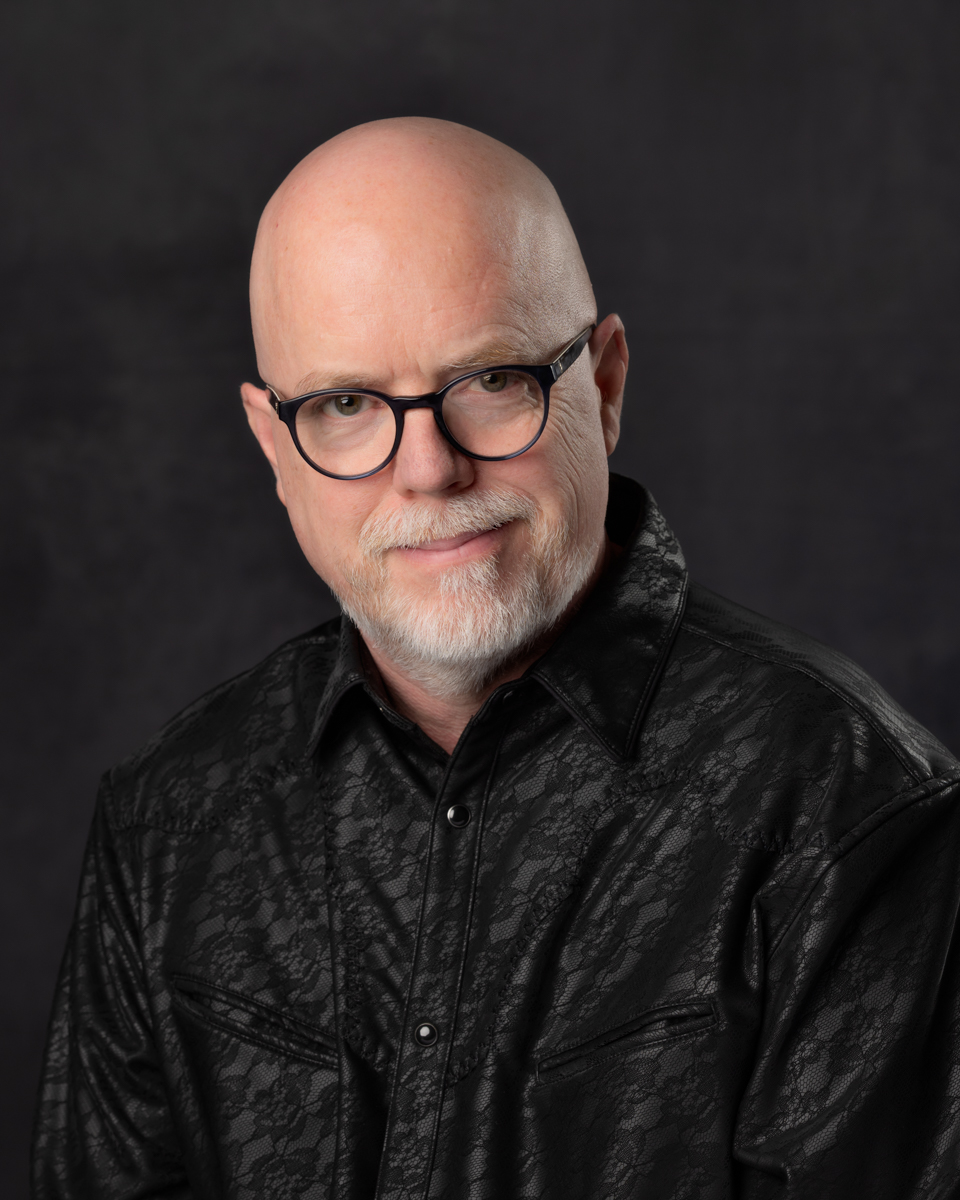
- Hall in 2023
- Born: Wisconsin, U.S.
- Occupations: Video game designer, programmer
- Employer: Romero Games
- Spouse: Terri Hall (died 2021)
- Website: thattomhall.com

Tom Hall is an American video game designer best known as a co-founder of id Software and designer on classic titles such as Doom, Wolfenstein 3D and Commander Keen. He has also been the co-founder of Ion Storm, together with his friend and colleague John Romero. During his years in the company, Hall designed and produced Anachronox and was also actively involved in the development of Deus Ex.

== Career ==
Hall attended the University of Wisconsin–Madison, where he earned a B.S. in Computer Science. In 1987, Hall worked at Softdisk Inc., where he was both a programmer and the editor of Softdisk, a software bundle delivered monthly. Along with some of his co-workers, John Carmack, John Romero and Adrian Carmack, he founded id Software, having always dreamt about the possibility of making videogames for a living. During the subsequent years, he served as creative director and designer there, working on games such as Catacomb 3-D and the Commander Keen series, of which he was the lead designer, then Wolfenstein 3D, Spear of Destiny, and Doom.

After some disputes with John Carmack and John Romero over the direction to take with Doom, Tom left id Software in August 1993 to join Apogee, a company that had become well renowned in the market for its highly successful shareware distribution philosophy, and came to be known as 3D Realms in later years. Tom was the game designer for Rise of the Triad, produced Terminal Velocity, and helped in varying degrees on Duke Nukem II and Duke Nukem 3D as well. He also worked on the Prey engine until August 12, 1996, when he left Apogee.

In November 1996, Hall co-founded Ion Storm with former id Software colleague John Romero. During the years at Ion Storm he produced the critically acclaimed Anachronox, a sci-fi themed adventure game with prominent role-playing elements. The company also produced the 2000 Game of the Year, Deus Ex, in which Hall voiced several characters. He and Romero then founded Monkeystone Games, a company with the goal of producing mobile games in the new mobile industry. He designed Hyperspace Delivery Boy!, which was released on December 23, 2001, with programming by John Romero.

He and Romero joined Midway Games in 2003, and Monkeystone closed in January 2005. Hall also left Midway early that year and did independent game consultation work out of Austin, Texas, until in February he joined a startup company called KingsIsle Entertainment based in the same area.

Hall left KingsIsle Entertainment and joined Loot Drop on January 1, 2011. Along with Loot Drop, he unsuccessfully tried to crowdfund a game called Shaker on the crowdfunding platform Kickstarter in October 2012. Hall later tried to crowdfund another game on Kickstarter, Worlds of Wander, which was also unsuccessful in reaching its goal.

In March 2013, Hall joined PlayFirst as Principal Designer.

In 2020 and 2021, he worked as a designer on the virtual reality tabletop RPG Demeo, published by Resolution Games for the Oculus Quest hardware.

== Dopefish ==
Hall is the creator of the Dopefish, a green, dimwitted fish in Commander Keen episode IV. References to it have appeared in other video games, including the Quake series, Rise of the Triad, Daikatana, Duke Nukem 3D and Max Payne since.

== Voice work ==
Hall provided the following voices for the computer role-playing game Deus Ex: Morpheus, a sentient AI; Howard Strong, a ruthless and cruel MJ12 operative; and Walton Simons, the nano-augmented Director of the Federal Emergency Management Agency (FEMA). He also voiced the project director in Deus Ex: Invisible War's opening cutscene, and PAL-18, Councilman Willis, Dr. Hush-Hush and Eddie the Chew in Anachronox. He was also the voice and likeness of the main antagonist of Rise of the Triad, El Oscuro, voiced the Death Monk enemies from the game, and earlier he voiced some of the characters in Wolfenstein 3D, including the female character Gretel Grösse.

== Personal life ==
Hall suffered a stroke on Tuesday, April 13, 2010. He was in rehabilitation until April 21, when he was released. He was married for eighteen years to Terri Hall, who died on May 2, 2021.

== Ludography ==
Year	Title	Developer	Publisher	Credited for
1989	Catacomb	Softdisk	Softdisk	Creative director (MS-DOS), Levels
1990	Commander Keen in Invasion of the Vorticons	Ideas from the Deep	Apogee Software	Creative director, sounds
1991	Slordax: The Unknown Enemy	Softdisk	Softdisk	Creative director
1991	Hovertank One	id Software	Softdisk	Game designer
1991	Catacomb II	Softdisk	Softdisk	Creative director
1991	Catacomb 3-D	id Software	Softdisk	Creative director
1991	Shadow Knights	id Software	Softdisk	Creative consultant, level design, sound
1991	Rescue Rover	id Software	Softdisk	Game designer
1991	Rescue Rover 2	id Software	Softdisk	Creative director
1991	Commander Keen in Keen Dreams	id Software	Softdisk	Creative director
1991	Commander Keen in Goodbye, Galaxy	id Software	Apogee Software	Creative director
1991	Commander Keen in Aliens Ate My Babysitter	id Software	FormGen	Creative director
1992	Wolfenstein 3D	id Software	Apogee Software	Creative director
1993	Doom	id Software	id Software	Uncredited creative director
1995	Rise of the Triad	Apogee Software	Apogee Software	Creative director
1995	Terminal Velocity	Terminal Reality	3D Realms	Producer
2001	Anachronox	Ion Storm	Eidos Interactive	Project leader, game designer
2002	Hyperspace Delivery Boy!	Monkeystone Games	Monkeystone Games	Game designer
2003	Red Faction	Monkeystone Games	THQ	Creative commando
2003	Jewels and Jim	Monkeystone Games	THQ	Game designer, lead programmer
2003	Dig It!	Monkeystone Games	THQ	Game designer, lead programmer
2003	Congo Cube	Monkeystone Games	THQ	Game designer, lead programmer
2005	Narc	VIS Entertainment	Midway Games	Creative director
2005	Area 51	Midway Austin	Midway Games	Additional writing and design
2012	Pettington Park	Loot Drop	Zynga	Creative director and lead designer
2016	Restaurant Dash with Gordon Ramsay	PlayFirst	Glu Mobile	Lead game designer
