= FormGen =

American software developer

FormGen Corporation
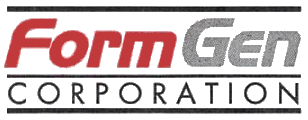
- Industry: Software
- Founded: 1987; 39 years ago in Bolton, Ontario, Canada
- Founders: Randy MacLean; Robert Van Rycke
- Defunct: 1996; 30 years ago
- Fate: Acquired by GT Interactive
- Headquarters: Scottsdale, Arizona, United States
- Products: Business software; Video games

FormGen Corporation was a developer of business software and publisher of video games based in Scottsdale, Arizona.

== History ==
FormGen was founded in 1987 by friends Randy MacLean and Robert Van Rycke in Bolton, Ontario. It was a software producer and distributor, selling its text-based form generation program through Radio Shack stores in Canada. Van Rycke left the company in October 1988 and was replaced later by James Perkins.

The company advanced rapidly in the early 1990s when it made an agreement with id Software to distribute its new games, such as Commander Keen in Aliens Ate My Babysitter, Wolfenstein 3D: Spear of Destiny, Doom (shareware), and with Apogee Software (later 3D Realms) for Rise of the Triad and Duke Nukem 3D.

After being based in North Andover, Massachusetts, FormGen relocated to the Scottsdale Airpark in Scottsdale, Arizona, in November 1993. The facility, which measured 9,000 square feet (840 m^{2}), was outgrown by October 1995, so the company moved to a nearby office of 25,000 square feet (2,300 m^{2}). FormGen opened its website in April 1996 to serve news and shareware downloads online. GT Interactive acquired FormGen in July 1996.

=== Lawsuit ===
FormGen was involved in a landmark intellectual property lawsuit, Micro Star v. FormGen Inc. They claimed that Micro Star's sale of the Nuke It compilation of user-created maps and levels infringed on its copyright of the derivative works of Duke Nukem 3D and won the case on appeal.
