= Adrian Carmack =

American video game artist

- Born: May 5, 1969 (age 57)
- Occupation: Video game artist
- Known for: Co-founder of id Software

Adrian Carmack (born May 5, 1969) is an American video game artist and one of four co-founders of id Software, along with Tom Hall, John Romero, and John Carmack (no relation). The founders met while working at Softdisk's Gamer's Edge division and started id in 1991. Adrian Carmack's primary role at the company was as an artist, including work on Commander Keen, Wolfenstein 3D, Doom, Hexen: Beyond Heretic, Quake, Quake II and Quake III Arena. He is credited as the creator of Doom's grotesque, gory art style as well as the term "gibs".

He was a 41% owner of ID until he left the company in 2005. At the time the press was told he felt he had done all he could do in the gaming field and was planning to pursue his passions of art. However, in September 2005, The Wall Street Journal revealed he was taking his former business partners to court, claiming he was effectively fired by them in an attempt to force him to sell his 41% stake in the company for $11 million (~$16.9 million in 2024) under the terms of a contract he wanted the court to nullify. $11 million was thought to be a fraction of the true value of his stake, which was thought to be closer to $43 million after the company received a $105 million bid from Activision in 2004.

In September 2014, Carmack was revealed as the new owner of the five-star Heritage Golf & Spa Resort in Killenard, Ireland.

In April 2016, it was reported that Carmack had reunited with Romero under a new Galway, Ireland-based start-up, The Night Work Games, to produce a new video game, Blackroom, for which they had launched a crowdfunding campaign on Kickstarter. The game has been described as "a return to fast, violent and masterful play on the PC". Later the campaign was put on hold to allow Carmack and Romero time to complete a working demo of the game. According to the two developers, their decision was based on players' feedback regarding the playability of the demo. The company behind Blackroom, Night Work Games, was seeking $700,000 to fund the development of the game. Before being put on hold, the campaign had raised $131,052 from its supporters.
