= List of disk magazines =

This article contains a list of magazines distributed on cassette, floppy disk, CD-ROM, or DVD-ROM — collectively referred to as disk magazines (or diskmags).

== Alphabetical list ==
=== A ===
- Adventurer (ZX Spectrum, 1995–2004, Russian/English [#14-#15 issues])
- El Afghano (IBM PC)
- Alive (Atari ST/Atari Falcon)
- Amber (IBM PC, 1998–1999)
- Amazine (Atari ST, 1992-1993)
- AMnews (Amiga, 1988–1989)
- Amoszine (Amiga)
- Amy PD and Shareware Review (Amiga, 1993-1994)
- AnotherMag (IBM PC)
- Apple Talk (Apple)
- Autark (IBM PC, 1996, English/German)

=== B ===
- Bad News (IBM PC, 1994–1996, English/Polish)
- Bain (IBM PC)
- Batsch (IBM PC, 1999, German)
- Beam (IBM PC, 1998–1999)
- Becanne (IBM PC)
- Belgian Scene Report (IBM PC)
- Big Blue Disk was a disk magazine published by Softdisk for IBM PC from 1986.
- Blackmail (IBM PC, 1993–1996, German)
- Budyn (IBM PC, 1996–2001, Polish/English)

=== C ===
- CD Gold (CD32/CDTV, 1993), commercial release and first known CD-ROM based disk magazine for the Amiga; produced by Goldtech with editorial support from Infinite Frontiers
- CD World (Amiga), CDTV, CD32, and Amiga CD-ROM systems; produced by Infinite Frontiers)
- Cee-64 Alive! (Commodore 64, relaunched as Commodore Cee (q.v.))
- Ceibe (IIBM PC, 1999–2000, Spain)
- Cheese (IBM PC, 1996–1997)
- Chromasette (TRS-80 Color Computer)
- CLI (IBM PC)
- CLOAD was a cassette and disk magazine for the TRS-80 which started in 1978. The magazine ran monthly and provided tapes by subscription. The magazine was named after the command to load a tape into the TRS-80.
- Compute!'s Gazette, originally announced as The Commodore Gazette, was a spinoff of Compute! for the Commodore 64.
- Contrast (IBM PC, 1994–1995)
- CooleR (IBM PC)
- Cows and Snakefights (Amiga)
- Cream (IBM PC)
- CURSOR (Commodore PET, 1978 to early 1980s)
- Cursor 64 (Commodore 64, early 1980s)

=== D ===
- Daskmig (IBM PC)
- Death (IBM PC)
- Defcon (IBM PC)
- Demojournal (IBM PC)
- DemoNews (IBM PC)
- Digital Chat (IBM PC)
- Digital Talk (Commodore 64)
- Disc, The (IBM PC) Beam Software, ca 1995-1996
- Disc Station (MSX, PC-9801, Windows 95, 1988–2000)
- Disk (Apple II, 1983; business-oriented)
- Disk Busters Association (DBA) Diskmagazine (Atari ST/Atari Falcon, 1991–1996)
- Disk Network (Apple II, c. 1983; geared to programmers)
- Disk User (BBC Micro, '80s)
- Diskazine (Apple II, 1982; geared to families)
- Diskworld (ISSN 0899-4838) (Mac, 1988–1993; relaunched as Softdisk for Mac (q.v.))
- Domination (Commodore 64)
- Dragon (IBM PC)
- Driven (Commodore 64, 1994–1995)

=== E ===
- European Top 20 (Amiga, 1992–1993)
- Evil (IBM PC)

=== F ===
- Fanzine (Amiga, Spanish)
- FaSTer (Atari ST, 1986-1987)
- Fatum (IBM PC)
- The Final Frontier (Amiga), first disk magazine dedicated solely to Star Trek; produced by Infinite Frontiers
- Flash (IBM PC)
- Fleur (IBM PC)
- Floppyland (IBM PC, 1990s)
- Fluxus (Mac HyperCard-based)
- FutureView (Amstrad CPC)

=== G ===
- Game On (Commodore 64, 1988–1995)
- Gamer's Edge (IBM PC, 1990–1991)
- Gedan (Amiga, 1994–1995)
- Generation (Amiga)
- Genetic Dreams (Commodore 64, IBM PC)
- Golden Disk 64 (Commodore 64, 1988–1996)
- GURU (Amiga, 1990–1992, 2011–2012, Hungarian)
- GURU (Amiga, 1991–1993, Slovak)

=== H ===
- Hacker (IBM PC, 1996–1999, Russian, Croatian)
- Harm (Hellraiser's alternative Russian magazine) (IBM PC)
- Heroin (IBM PC, 1998, English)
- Hoax (IBM PC, 1992–1995, English)
- Hot-Mag (IBM PC, 1994–1995, German)
- Hugi (IBM PC, 1996–present, English, German and Russian)
- Hugi.GER (IBM PC, 2000–2005, German)
- HugiNews (IBM PC, 1998–2000, English)
- Hydrophobia (IBM PC, 1996–1997, Hungarian)

=== I ===
- I.B.Magazette (IBM PC, 1982–?)
- Image (IBM PC)
- Imazine (Amiga)
- Imphobia (IBM PC)
- Incube (IBM PC)
- Infinity (IBM PC)
- Input 64 (Commodore 64)
- Insomnia (Amiga)

=== J ===
- Jumpdisk (Amiga)
- Jurassic Pack (Amiga)

=== K ===
- Kelstar (Atari)
- Kendermag (IBM PC)
- Karmelia (Amiga)

=== L ===
- Lano (IBM PC)
- Launch (Microsoft Windows and Mac OS 7.1 up, late 1990s - early 2000s)
- Legend (IBM PC)
- Loadstar (ISSN 0886-4144) (Commodore 64, 1984–2010)
- Loadstar 128 (Commodore 128)
- Lookain Fanz (IBM PC)
- Luna (IBM PC)
- Lunchtime (Amiga and Acorn Archimedes, 1990–1996) (#1-Digital Dog Edition; #2 - Hamsters on the Prowl; #3 - Edward's Revenge; #4 - Yul Brynner's Memorial Toolshed; #5 - Wardrobe Racing for Foreigners; #6 - Danger: Unexploded Whippet)

=== M ===
- The Mag (IBM PC)
- Maggie (Atari ST, 1990-2000)
- Maggie (Atari ST, 1990-1995)
- Magic Disk 64 (Commodore 64, 1987–1993)
- Maniac Magazine (IBM PC)
- Marriage Connection (IBM PC, 1989; computer-aided activities for married couples)
- M*A*R*S (IBM PC)
- McDisk (Amiga)
- Megazin (Amiga)
- Mentor (IBM PC, c. 1983; mostly support programs for business software)
- MicroCode (IBM PC)
- Microzine (Apple II, c. 1983; geared to pre-teens)
- Miggybyte (Amiga, 1995–1997)
- Mr. AMOS Club (Amiga)

=== N ===
- Nautilus (Apple Macintosh)
- New World Order (IBM PC)

=== O ===
- Obligement (Amiga - diskmag between 1998 and 2005, website only since 2005)
- The Official Eurochart (Amiga)
- On Disk Monthly (IBM PC, 1991–1993; relaunched as Softdisk PC (q.v.))
- Ooze (IBM PC)
- Overshadow (Commodore 64, 1997–, Hungarian)

=== P ===
- Pain (IBM PC)
- Parrot (IBM PC)
- PC BusinessDisk (IBM PC, 1990–1991)
- PC Disk (IBM PC, c. 1983; mostly business)
- PC Disk Downunder (ISSN 1170-2737) (IBM PC; Australia/New Zealand adaptation of Big Blue Disk)
- PC Life (IBM PC, 1988)
- Platinum (IBM PC, German)
- Pornograffitti (Commodore 64, 1992-?, Canada)
- Pressure (Amiga)
- The Product (IBM PC)
- Pulse (IBM PC)

=== R ===
- RAW (Amiga)
- Reality Check Network (IBM PC)
- Restless (IBM PC)
- ROM (Amiga)

=== S ===
- Satanic Rites (Amiga)
- Savage (IBM PC)
- Savage Charts (IBM PC)
- Saxonia (IBM PC)
- The Scene Post (IBM PC)
- Scene World Magazine (Commodore 64, Amiga, 2000–present)
- Scenedicate (Dreamcast, 2005–present)
- Scenial (IBM PC)
- Schwugi (IBM PC)
- Sex'n'Crime was a disk magazine for the demoscene of the Commodore 64 home computer. The magazine was published from 1989 to 1990 by Amok, a label of publisher Genesis Project, and mainly edited by anonymous writer OMG. The successor was titled Propaganda.
- SharePaper (IBM PC)
- ShareWorld Magazine (Amiga, 1994-1999)
- Shine (IBM PC)
- Showtime (Amiga)
- Sinner (IBM PC)
- Skyline (IBM PC)
- Slonecznik (IBM PC)
- Smok (IBM PC)
- Smurffi (IBM PC)
- Sneaker (IBM PC)
- Soap (IBM PC)
- Softdisk (ISSN 0886-4152) (Apple II, 1981–1995)
- Softdisk for Mac (Mac, 1993–1998)
- Softdisk for Windows (Windows, 1994–1999)
- Softdisk G-S (Apple IIGS, 1989–?)
- Softdisk PC (IBM PC, 1993–1998)
- SoftSide (various platforms, early 1980s; disk/cassette companion to paper magazine)
- Speed (Amiga)
- Splash (IBM PC)
- ST NEWS (Atari ST, 1986-1996)
- Static Line (IBM PC)
- Stream CD-ROM Digizine (IBM PC)
- Subkult (IBM PC)
- Subliminal Extacy (ZX Spectrum)
- Suicide (IBM PC, German)
- Sunray (IBM PC)
- Syntax Error (IBM PC)

=== T ===
- TAP.MAG (IBM PC, 2000–2001, German)
- Terror News (Commodore Plus/4, 1990–1992, 2024; IBM PC, 1992–1997, Hungarian)
- Testimony of the Ancients (IBM PC)
- Total Disaster (IBM PC)
- Totem (IBM PC)
- Trashcan (Amiga, 1995–1999, Spanish, English)
- Trip! (IBM PC)
- Trip 2 Hell (IBM PC)

=== U ===
- Undercover Magascene (Atari ST) (merged with Alive Disk Magazine in 2000, but re-animated in 2001)
- Underground News (Commodore 64, 1990-1994 - Canada)
- Upstream (Amiga)
- UpTime (various platforms, 1984–1990)
- El Usuario (IBM PC; Latin American adaptation of Big Blue Disk)

=== V ===
- Vagina (IBM PC)
- Vandalism (Commodore 64)
- Versus (IBM PC)
- Vision (Commodore 64, 1993–1996)
- Vixel (VIC-20, early 1980s)
- The Voice (IBM PC)
- v.O.L.V.o (IBM PC)

=== W ===
- What (IBM PC)
- WildMag (IBM PC, 2000–2001, German)
- Window (Apple II, 1982; educational)
- Worldcharts (IBM PC)
- Wrotki (IBM PC)

=== X ===
- X-Ray (IBM PC)

=== Y ===
- Yahoo (IBM PC)
- Yonga (IBM PC)

=== Z ===
- Zircon Amiga Magazine (Amiga)
- Zeitenwanderer (IBM PC, German)
- ZINE (Amiga, IBM PC from issue #12)

== See also ==
- Covermount
- Cassette magazine
