= Catacomb 3-D =

1991 video game

- Title screen
- Developer: id Software
- Publisher: Softdisk
- Director: Tom Hall
- Composer: Robert Prince
- Engine: Prototype of Wolfenstein 3D engine
- Platform: MS-DOS
- Release: NA: November 1991
- Genre: First-person shooter
- Mode: Single-player

Catacomb 3-D (also known as Catacomb 3-D: A New Dimension, Catacomb 3-D: The Descent, and Catacombs 3) is a first-person shooter video game, the third in the Catacomb series, the first of which to feature 3D computer graphics. It was developed by id Software and originally published by Softdisk under the Gamer's Edge label, released in November 1991. The player takes control of the high wizard Petton Everhail, descending into the catacombs of the Towne Cemetery to defeat the evil lich Nemesis and rescue his friend Grelminar. (Note: The identities of Nemesis and Grelminar switch between releases, with John Romero declaring that Grelminar is the lich, but the later sequels depicting Nemesis as such.)

Catacomb 3-D is a landmark title in terms of first-person graphics. It is one of the first examples of the modern, character-based first-person shooter genre, and a direct ancestor to the games that popularized the genre. It was released for MS-DOS with EGA graphics. The game introduced the concept of showing the player's hand in the three-dimensional viewpoint, and an enhanced version of its technology was later used for the more successful Wolfenstein 3D. The game's more primitive technological predecessor was Hovertank 3D. The game was published at retail by GT Interactive as Catacomb 3 in 1993. A special collector's edition box containing three variations of the game by Romero Games was released in 2024.

== Production ==
The origin of the games is Catacomb by John Carmack for IBM PC compatibles and Apple II. This was a two-dimensional game using a third-person view from above, released in 1989–1990. It was followed up with Catacomb II, which used the same game engine with new levels. The first release of Catacomb 3-D was called Catacomb 3-D: A New Dimension, but was later re-released as Catacomb 3-D: The Descent, as well as Catacombs 3 for a re-release as commercially packaged software (the earlier versions had been released by other means such as disk magazines and downloads). The game creators were John Carmack, John Romero, Jason Blochowiak (programmers), Tom Hall (creative director), Adrian Carmack (artist), and Robert Prince (musician). The game was programmed using the Borland C++ programming language.

Catacomb 3-D screenshot

id Software's use of texture mapping in Catacomb 3-D was influenced by Ultima Underworld (still in development at Catacomb 3-D's release). Conflicting accounts exist regarding the extent of this influence, however. In the book Masters of Doom, author David Kushner asserts that the concept was discussed only briefly during a 1991 telephone conversation between Underworld developer Paul Neurath and John Romero. In contrast, Paul Neurath has stated multiple times that John Carmack and John Romero had seen the game's 1990 CES demo, and recalled a comment from Carmack that he could write a faster texture mapper.

== Catacomb Adventure Series ==
Catacomb 3-D was followed by three games, in the so-called Catacomb Adventure Series. They were not developed by id Software but internally by Softdisk with a new staff for Gamer's Edge, who also made the later Dangerous Dave sequels. All of the games, including the original Catacomb titles, are now distributed legally by Flat Rock Software through their own web store and via GOG.com. Flat Rock have also released the source code for the games under GNU GPL-2.0-or-later in June 2014 in a manner similar those done by id and partners. This has led to the creation of the source port Reflection Catacomb, also called Reflection Keen due to shared support for Keen Dreams, and ports all of the 3D Catacomb games to modern systems. Another project, CatacombGL, is an enhanced OpenGL port for Microsoft Windows and Linux.

The credits for the series are Mike Maynard, James Row, Nolan Martin (programming), Steven Maines (art direction), Carol Ludden, Jerry Jones, Adrian Carmack (art production), James Weiler, Judi Mangham (quality assurance), and id Software (3D imaging effects). The series' development head, Greg Malone, later became creative director for Duke Nukem 3D and also worked on Shadow Warrior for 3D Realms. Department heads Mike Maynard and Jim Row, meanwhile, would co-found JAM Productions (soon joined by Jerry Jones), the creators of Blake Stone using an enhanced Wolfenstein 3D engine.

The series also introduced an item called crystal hourglasses, which would temporarily freeze time and allow the player to stage shots to destroy enemies upon the resumption of normal time, pre-dating later bullet time features in games such as Requiem: Avenging Angel and Max Payne.

=== Catacomb Abyss ===
Catacomb Abyss is the sequel to Catacomb 3-D, and featured the same main character in a new adventure: since his defeat, some of Nemesis' minions have built a mausoleum in his honour. Fearful of the dark mage's return, the townspeople hire Everhail to descend below and end the evil. The environments are more varied than in Catacomb 3D, featuring crypts, gardens, mines, aqueducts, volcanic regions and various other locales. It was the only game in the series that was distributed as shareware, released by Softdisk in 1992.

=== Catacomb Armageddon ===
Catacomb Armageddon screenshot

Catacomb Armageddon is the sequel to Catacomb Abyss, only now set in the present day. The levels feature towns, forests, temples, torture chambers, an ant colony, and a crystal maze. It was developed by Softdisk and was later republished by Froggman under the title Curse of the Catacombs.

=== Catacomb Apocalypse ===
Catacomb Apocalypse is the final game in the Catacomb Adventure Series. It was set in the distant future, accessible via time portals, and mixed fantasy and science fiction elements, pitting players against robotic necromancers and the like. It is also the only game in the trilogy to have a hub system, though it was present in the original Catacomb 3D. It was developed by Softdisk and later republished by Froggman under the title Terror of the Catacombs.

== Reception ==
According to John Romero, the team felt it lacked the coolness and fun of Commander Keen, although the 3D technology was interesting to work with. Computer Gaming World in May 1993 called The Catacomb Abyss "very enjoyable" despite the "minimal" EGA graphics and sound. The magazine stated in February 1994 that Terror of the Catacombs's "playability is good, almost addictive, and offers bang for the buck in spite of its lackluster" EGA graphics. Transend Services Ltd. sold over 1,000 copies of the game in the first month of its release.
