= Hovertank One =

1991 video game

- Title screen
- Developer: id Software
- Publisher: Softdisk
- Director: Tom Hall
- Designer: Tom Hall
- Programmers: John Carmack; John Romero
- Artist: Adrian Carmack
- Engine: Prototype of Wolfenstein 3D engine
- Platform: MS-DOS
- Release: NA: 1991 (Note: The book Masters of Doom states that Hovertank One was released in April 1991. However, the book Doom Guy: Life in first person states that the deadline for submitting the game to Softdisk was May 31, 1991, which was met just in time.)
- Genres: Vehicular combat, first-person shooter
- Mode: Single-player

Hovertank One (also known as Hovertank and Hovertank 3D) (Note: The name Hovertank is used on the MS-DOS title screen. Hovertank 3-D is a name used in the start menu in Softdisk's 1992 Gamer's Edge release. Hovertank One is used on the original box art and floppy disks of the Gamer's Edge 1991 mail-order release.) is a vehicular combat game for MS-DOS developed by id Software and published by Softdisk in 1991. The objective of the game is to navigate levels with a hovertank, in order to rescue civilians before a timer runs out. Hovertank One is the first game from id Software to utilize a first-person perspective, which marked the start of a new direction for the company. The game would essentially serve as a prototype for the game engine that was used in the first-person shooter Wolfenstein 3D.

== Plot ==
Hovertank One is set during a nuclear war. In Hovertank One, the player controls Brick Sledge, a soldier of fortune hired by an organisation to rescue civilians from cities under the threat of nuclear annihilation.

== Gameplay ==
Gameplay screenshot

The player drives a hovertank through the levels to locate the civilians that need to be rescued. There are enemies in the levels, including mutants and flying saucers equipped with tentacles. There is a timer that counts how long until the nuke is dropped. Once all civilians are collected, a portal appears somewhere in the level. The player must find the portal to win. When victorious, the player receives their fee based on the number of people safely rescued.

== Development ==
The video game company id Software was founded on February 1st, 1991 by John Carmack, John Romero, Adrian Carmack and Tom Hall. The four founders had an agreement with their former employer, software company Softdisk, to develop one game every two months for the Gamer's Edge PC game subscription service. In the first months of 1991 they developed the platform game Dangerous Dave in the Haunted Mansion, followed by the puzzle game Rescue Rover.

While the team was working on these games, programmer John Carmack was experimenting with 3D rendering. At that time 3D games already existed, with the space dogfight game Wing Commander being one of the favorites among the id Software crew. However, existing 3D games were noticeably slow and John Carmack preferred fast action games like Gauntlet. Therefore, Carmack's goal was to develop a game engine for a fast 3D action game. Carmack started his research by buying some literature on trigonometry and other mathematics related to 3D rendering. At first, he created a demonstration application of a cube rotating in 3D. Then he developed an animated Gamer's Edge logo that would scale in 2D, which was used in Dangerous Dave. Drawing arbitrary polygons would be very slow on PC hardware of that time, so Carmack came up with the idea of rendering walls in 3D as simple trapezoids. Further performance was gained by representing characters in the 3D world as 2D images that would scale depending on the distance towards the player. His research into this game engine took six weeks, two weeks longer than any id Software engine before it.

When John Carmack demonstrated this game engine to the rest of the team in April 1991, they decided to create Hovertank One: a game where the player would drive around in a futuristic tank to shoot at enemies and rescue hostages. Artist Adrian Carmack enjoyed drawing the monsters and other ghoulish touches. The graphics were created in 16 colors, to be compatible with the EGA display standard. John Romero created sound effects for the game by simply producing strange sounds with his own voice. The levels were designed by John Romero and Tom Hall. The levels consisted of orthogonally placed walls, which enabled them to reuse their internally developed Tile EDitor, named TED. The deadline for submitting the game to Softdisk was May 31, 1991, which the team managed to meet just in time.

== Release ==
Hovertank One was initially distributed in 1991 by Softdisk as part of their Gamer's Edge subscription service. In 1992, the game was marketed by Softdisk as part of The Lost Game Collection of ID Software. Hovertank One was also included in the id Anthology collection, as published by id Software in 1996.

The source code of the game was released in June 2014 under version 2 of the GNU General Public License. This release was initiated by Flat Rock Software, a software company that owned the intellectual property of Hovertank One at that time.

== Reception ==
The biography Masters of Doom claims that id Software "had invented a genre" when they released Hovertank One as the first fast-paced first-person shooter for the PC. However, it also acknowledges that the "big solid-colored walls" make the game visually less attractive when compared to Commander Keen. Website IGN describes Hovertank One as a game with a "unique, addictive design that still holds up today as an old school masterpiece". The book DOOM Scarydarkfast criticizes the lack of wall textures and it considers the progression through the game as "much more sluggish" compared to later games from id Software. The book Shareware Heroes praises the speed of the 3D graphics, but also notes that the simplistic walls give the game a primitive look and feel. In his autobiography, game designer John Romero retrospectively considers Hovertank One an innovating game that "just didn't feel great". He feels that the tank gun lacks the responsiveness and realism of weapons from later id Software games.

== Legacy ==
Hovertank One marked the start of a new direction for id Software. Their shift towards 3D games with a first-person perspective would pave the way for their future success. In November 1991 they improved their 3D game engine with texture mapping for the first-person shooter Catacomb 3D. Further improvements to the game engine led in 1992 to the release of the critically and commercially successful first-person shooter Wolfenstein 3D. In retrospect, both Hovertank One and Catacomb 3D essentially served as experiments or prototypes for the game engine that was used in Wolfenstein 3D. For this reason, video game magazine PC Gamer highlighted Hovertank One in their historical overview of the first-person shooter genre.
