= Diskworld =

Computer magazine

Issue #1 (1988)

Diskworld (ISSN 0899-4838) was a disk magazine for the Apple Macintosh computer system, published by Softdisk beginning in 1988. It was a sister publication of Softdisk for the Apple II, Loadstar for the Commodore 64, and Big Blue Disk for the IBM PC. Diskworld ceased publication in 1998.

== Overview ==
Diskworld was originally designed and created by Sean Golden (Managing Editor), Jeff Billings (Senior Programmer) and Lynda Fowler (Junior Programmer). Sean Golden wrote the original Diskworld "shell" program which provided access to the monthly disk contents. He also wrote most of the editorial content each month. Jeff Billings and Lynda Fowler developed monthly productivity, utility or game programs which were published on the disk. Jeff and Lynda also provided some editorial content, and Sean also contributed programs. Freelance programmers also provided content for a fee. The product was broken down into editorials, articles, reviews, artwork and software, all presented with the custom "shell" program which allowed users to run the disk without having to swap out system disks on the original Macintosh. The early issues were published on 400K disks, but moved to 800K disks when the 400K disks become obsolete.

Eventually it was possible to produce a version of the "shell" program that did not carry a duplicate version of the Mac OS when hard drives became commonplace. That allowed for more content to be published on each disk. Jeff Billings left the company and Lynda Fowler became Senior Programmer. When Sean Golden was promoted to Softdisk Publishing, Inc. Publisher, Lynda Fowler became Managing Editor of Diskworld.

Later, Diskworld was renamed Softdisk for Mac, but it ceased publication in 1998 along with the other disk magazines published by Softdisk (other than Loadstar, which broke off as an independent company and continued into the 2000s) as the company moved more into Internet development.
