= Rescue Rover =

1991 video game

- MS-DOS title screen
- Developer: id Software
- Publisher: Softdisk
- Designer: Tom Hall
- Programmers: John Carmack; John Romero
- Artist: Adrian Carmack
- Platforms: MS-DOS, Apple IIGS
- Release: 1991
- Genre: Puzzle
- Mode: Single-player

Rescue Rover is a puzzle video game that was developed by id Software and published by Softdisk in 1991. The game was distributed as shareware, with the first 10 levels making up the shareware version, and another 20 levels being present in the registered version. This is one of several games written by id to fulfil their contractual obligation to produce games for Softdisk, where the id founders had been employed. A sequel, Rescue Rover 2, followed.

== Plot ==
Roger and Rover are the two main characters. Rover the dog is frequently kidnapped by robots. The player, Roger the owner, must enter robot territory and get him back, hence the name "Rescue Rover".

== Gameplay ==
Each level starts with Roger climbing up a ladder set into the floor, and the player completes the level by arriving back at this ladder with Rover - at which point Roger climbs down with Rover. Gameplay involves getting Rover out repeatedly in a set of increasingly difficult levels, by moving objects around in a grid to open up a path to get to the dog and then bring it back out. There are four different types of robot in the game, each with different behaviour. One type shoots Roger if he stands in front of it, but doesn't move, another type runs around and shoots Roger if he is seen, another type chases Roger around, and the last type runs around and kills Roger if it runs into him. To get to Rover, the player must normally avoid, trap or destroy them. There are various items which Roger can push around in the world: crates (which float on water), mirror blocks (which reflect lasers at an angle), star pearls and anti-gravity carts. Other items in the areas are grated floors (which robots cannot travel on), glowing floors (which Roger cannot travel on), water (including moving water in which crates float with the current), laser projectors, teleporters and force doors (which need an access card in order to be opened).

== Development ==
Rescue Rover had its programming origins in an aborted Super Mario Bros. 3 port that id proposed to Nintendo six months earlier in 1990. Though Nintendo declined, the advances that it made in that demo aided development of their later projects, including Commander Keen and Dangerous Dave in the Haunted Mansion.

== Release ==
Rescue Rover was released in 1991. In 1997, it was included in an anthology of all id's games to date.

== Reception ==
David Kushner, in Masters of Doom, called it "a clever maze game" and cited it as an example of an emerging trend in id's games: darkly humorous violence. Travis Fahs of IGN wrote that despite the title was less impressive compared to other id's games, Rover had a cult following with the gamers, a factor which led to creation of a sequel. In a 2008 IGN reader poll about their favorite early id game, Rescue Rover received one vote.
