= Miggybyte =

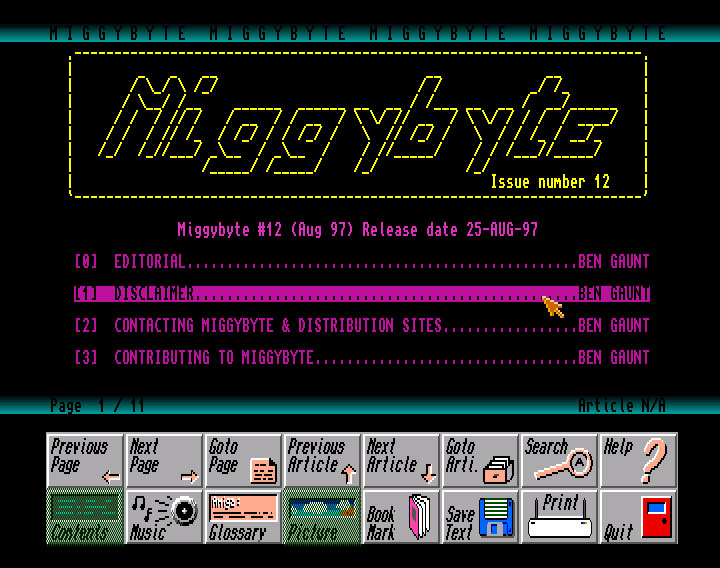
Screen shot of Miggybyte

Miggybyte was a free disk-based magazine for the Amiga range of computers, published by Pickled Fish Software and edited by Ben Gaunt. From 1995 to 1997 twelve issues were published all being on a single floppy disk only.

The magazine was inspired by Grapevine, the scene-based disk magazine also for the Amiga range of computers, but Miggybyte was not a scene publication.

The publication focused on news about the Amiga, software, games and entertainment. The entertainment section proved to be a mainstay of the publication and consisting of jokes and stories from readers. There was even a small classified section and BBS section where many sysops from around the UK (though a few from the US too) would publicise their boards. Many articles were downloaded from other online or BBS sources.

The interface consisted of two sections, the top part containing the text and in latter version graphics, the bottom the control interface (GUI). The engine behind the publication was called MultiMedia Magazine Creator (MMMC) and was developed by Pickled Fish Software / Ben Gaunt. MMMC was originally a simple text reader designed for the game F1 Licenseware game Maze Madness. MMMC was programmed in AMOS BASIC and used the PowerPacker library to compress the publication onto a single disk.

== Distribution ==
Miggybyte was distributed by post, BBS, FidoNet, PD Software Libraries and the Internet, its main distribution being on Aminet and its WHQ BBS Channel X. Two version were released digitally one in LHA (file format) that omitted any copyrighted Amiga, Inc. files and a DMS (Disk Masher System) version that was a full disk image.

== Reception ==
Miggybyte #5 was reviewed in Amiga User International, which rated the issue 80%. The reviewer was critical of the amount of swearing in readers' letters.

Miggbyte issue 9 was reviewed in the August 1997 issue of Amiga Computing, which praised the reviews and humour, and described the user interface is "simple if not especially pretty".

== See also ==
- Disk magazine
- List of disk magazines
