= Hugi =

Demoscene disk magazine

Hugi is one of the longest-running and most frequently released demoscene and underground disk magazines for IBM PC compatibles.

== History ==
The first issues were in German language and were released in 1996. From issue 11 on the magazine issued in German and English. With issue 18 the German part became a separate magazine called Hugi.GER. Moreover, in the years 1998 to 2000 there was a weekly newsletter which continued the tradition of similar publications such as Demonews.

Hugi began as an electronic school magazine and grew into a long-running demoscene and underground diskmag. Its content consists mainly of reader contributions, which the editors proofread and format. Topics include graphics, demos, demoparties, programming, other diskmags, reports, politics and literature. Each issue also includes graphics and background music.

Articles from Hugi have been cited in all three doctoral theses about the demoscene that have been published in the years 2011 to 2017. The book Hacking Europe - From Computer Cultures to Demoscenes, from 2014, also mentions Hugi in one chapter.

== Issues ==
38 issues were released until June 2014, 17 of which were partially or completely in German. 12 issues were also translated to the Russian language. Moreover, five issues of the German language offspring Hugi.GER, 38 newsletters and 4 special editions (Coding Digest, Hugibox music disk, Interview Bonanza and Special Edition #4) were released. The main editor of Hugi, Claus D. Volko (Vienna, Austria), is also known as “Adok” in the demoscene.

Hugi was one of the first diskmags that was released as a Windows executable (September 1998). Moreover, it was a dual DOS and Windows diskmag for 6 issues (September 1998 to August 1999). Both facts were strongly notable at this time and caused a lot of discussion. The magazine uses the engine "Panorama", which was created for Hugi by the Polish programmer Chris Dragan. Many other electronic magazines are nowadays also based on it.

Issue	Release month	Text amount	Code by	Graphics by	Music by	Remarks
HDE #1	May 1996	420 kB	Adok	Adok	-	Music in the early issues was taken from freeware MOD collections
HDE #2	August 1996	460 kB	Adok	Adok	-	
HDE #3	November 1996	340 kB	Adok	Kaktus	-	
HDE #4	January 1997	450 kB	Adok	Kaktus	-	
Hugi #5	March 1997	430 kB	Adok	Adok	-	New text viewer with smooth scrolling in text mode
Hugi #6	May 1997	680 kB	Adok	Adok	-	Completely new engine in SVGA
Hugi #7	August 1997	530 kB	Adok	Dr. Brain, Adok	-	
Hugi #8	October 1997	620 kB	Adok	Dr. Brain, Adok	-	
Hugi #9	December 1997	880 kB	Adok	Mr. SEQ	Mr. SEQ	Again a new engine, with various new features; includes an English corner
Hugi #10	April 1998	850 kB	Adok	Mr. SEQ	Mr. SEQ	Last regular issue with mostly German articles
Hugi #11	June 1998	1.0 MB	Adok, Salami	Antony, Hellfire, Dendrite	Smash	First issue with mostly English articles
Hugi #12	September 1998	1.8 MB	Street Raider	Will Be, Hellfire, Mr. SEQ	Makke	New engine, now for both DOS and Windows
Hugi #13	November 1998	1.2 MB	Street Raider	Cereal	MasterBoy, CoaXCable, Steffo	
Hugi #14	February 1999	1.4 MB	Street Raider	Hellfire, Luminos	BenJam, Laxical, Makke	
Hugi #15	May 1999	1.4 MB	Street Raider	Hellfire, Scape	Nightbeat, Dawnstar	
Hugi #16	July 1999	2.1 MB	Street Raider	FloOd, TAD	Bacter, Echo	
Hugi #17	August 1999	1.4 MB	Street Raider	Raven of Defacto 2, Hellfire	Avalanche, P-rat, Spin	
Hugi #18	December 1999	0.9 MB	Chris Dragan	Dines	Acumen, Andromeda, Traymuss, Ciccilleju, Kenedy	New engine with many new features, more professional looks than before
Hugi #19	April 2000	1.3 MB	Chris Dragan	Bridgeclaw, TAD	Makke, P-rat, JKL	
Hugi #20	August 2000	864 kB	Chris Dragan	CoaXCable, Mali, TAD	Ciccilleju, Stanley	
Hugi #21	December 2000	867 kB	Chris Dragan	Kthulu, Mali, TAD	Yero, Acumen, Exodus	
Hugi #22	April 2001	852 kB	Chris Dragan	Kthulu, nldsr	Iliks, Chavez, JKL, Smirk, Rieha, Ciccilleju	Features mostly chiptunes as background music
Hugi #23	August 2001	1.3 MB	Chris Dragan	Partikle, nldsr	Steffo, Gopher, CoaXCable	Contains a Bachelor thesis about the demoscene
Hugi #24	January 2002	880 kB	Chris Dragan	Critikill, Fjrb, Tomaes	JosSs, Daike, Substance, Peal Hunter, Iliks	
Hugi #25	July 2002	967 kB	Chris Dragan	Fusko, Fjrb, TAD	Iliks, Bozo, Zalza, Look	
Hugi #26	February 2003	1023 kB	Chris Dragan	Raven of Nuance, LoneStar, Fjrb, TAD	Gargoyle, JDruid, JosSs, Qumran, Chavez, Arel Frost, Iliks, Zalza	Contains a special corner about Winamp skinning
Hugi #27	July 2003	630 kB	Chris Dragan	Seven 11, TAD, Steve Bian	My Voice, Gloom, Merlin, Teller	
Hugi #28	December 2003	630 kB	Chris Dragan	Raven, TAD, Sunchild	Eterman, Luke, Impulse	
Hugi #29	August 2004	520 kB	Chris Dragan	Raven, LoneStar, Adok	Melcom, Dynamite, Valzihjken, Kenedy, CoaXCable	
Hugi #30	February 2005	906 kB	Chris Dragan	LoneStar	JDruid, SpiiKKi, Converse, LoneStar, JosSs, Stanley	
Hugi #31	November 2005	620 kB	Chris Dragan	Bridgeclaw, nldsr, LoneStar	rzs, Stanley, Pearl Hunter, Anarkimedes	
Hugi #32	August 2006	930 kB	Chris Dragan	Critikill, Mantraz, Bridgeclaw	Slashy, Dafunk, Lex, Lesnik, Nightbeat, Rieha, Aquafresh	10-year-anniversary issue; first issue with a higher resolution (1024x768)
Hugi #33	April 2007	800 kB	Chris Dragan	Bridgeclaw, Noogman	Siatek, Buzzer, Mice, Chromag	First issue to use music in MP3 format
Hugi #34	February 2008	1080 kB	Chris Dragan	Tascha, Bridgeclaw	Chromag, Traymuss, Siatek	
Hugi #35	November 2008	780 kB	Chris Dragan	Fabian, Ra	Jogeir Liljedahl, Siatek, Buzzer, Mice, Traymuss	
Hugi #36	April 2010	900 kB	Chris Dragan	Alena Lazareva, Anthony Gargasz, Dzordan, Fabian, Ra, Bridgeclaw, Rork	Moby, Romeo Knight, Siatek, Traymuss, pOWL, Magnar	Contains the full "International Diskmag Encyclopedia"
Hugi #37	April 2012	850 kB	Chris Dragan	Bridgeclaw, Dzordan, Forcer, Rork, Fabian	Magnar, Traymuss, Romeo Knight, CONS, Chaser, Chromag, Siatek	
Hugi #38	June 2014	1.1 MB	Chris Dragan	Forcer, Slayer, Prince	Magnar, Wiklund, Mantronix, Traymuss, Hoffman, Chaser, Siatek, Xerxes, Revisq	

== Criticism ==
Hugi has attracted a large amount of controversy itself roughly after its 26th issue; many sceners complained that a large portion of articles were uninteresting and not related to the demoscene itself. This problem was further emphasized by the fact that Hugi editors were accused by spamming demoscene forums by requests for articles, even though a considerable portion of the scene had denounced Hugi by this time. Interest has been since rekindled for the latest issues, as the editor crew has announced to apply more intense quality control over their articles.

The 30th issue of Hugi was a subject of confusion when it appeared that the 'demoscene' section of the magazine could only be accessed through a self-confessed 'IQ-test'. The test was viewed by most demoscener readers as gratuitous and not serving any practical purpose, especially because it was relatively easily bypassable with e.g. trial and error.

The 35th issue of Hugi raised a yet unseen backlash, when it was discovered that the mag contained an article opposing immigration to Europe from Islamic and African countries because of the immigrants' religion and their allegedly low IQ. While the article was removed within 6 hours, questions were raised whether the article slipped through quality control (the scenario supported by the editors, but considered preposterous by the readers), was included because of simply of the yellow journalistic value, or whether main editor Adok simply included the article because he agreed with the content, after he initially did not apologize or comment on the issue. The article was later revealed by the author to be a complete ruse, a copy-paste from Wikipedia and a text written by Finnish philologist Mikko Ellilä, aimed to test whether the article of such content could get in the final magazine. The diskmag was near-universally condemned, amid additional accusations of "jumping the bandwagon" started by diskmag ZINE of having a "headlines" demo to increase anticipation, copying ZINE's unique 3-by-2 thumbnailed layout and "roundtable" interviews.

The 36th issue of Hugi, from April 2010, garnered mostly positive feedback.

== Hugi Size Coding Competition ==
The Hugi staff also hosts a popular series of online Assembler programming and size-optimizing contests called “Hugi Size Coding Competition”. The objective is to implement a given program using as little space as possible. This results in executable files with a size of far less than one kilobyte. Since 1998, 29 competitions have been held so far. The number of participants per contest is usually 20 - 80. Participants come from virtually all over the world (North America, Europe, East Asia, South Africa, Australia,...). Every contestant gets points depending on the size of their entry. After each competition, the entries are released together with source code, and a discussion in a mailing list occurs in which objections regarding the validity of the entries can be made. The authors of invalid entries receive a penalty. Once a year, a "world league table" is generated in which the points from all contests held in that year have been added together.
