= John Carmack =

American computer programmer and video game developer (born 1970)

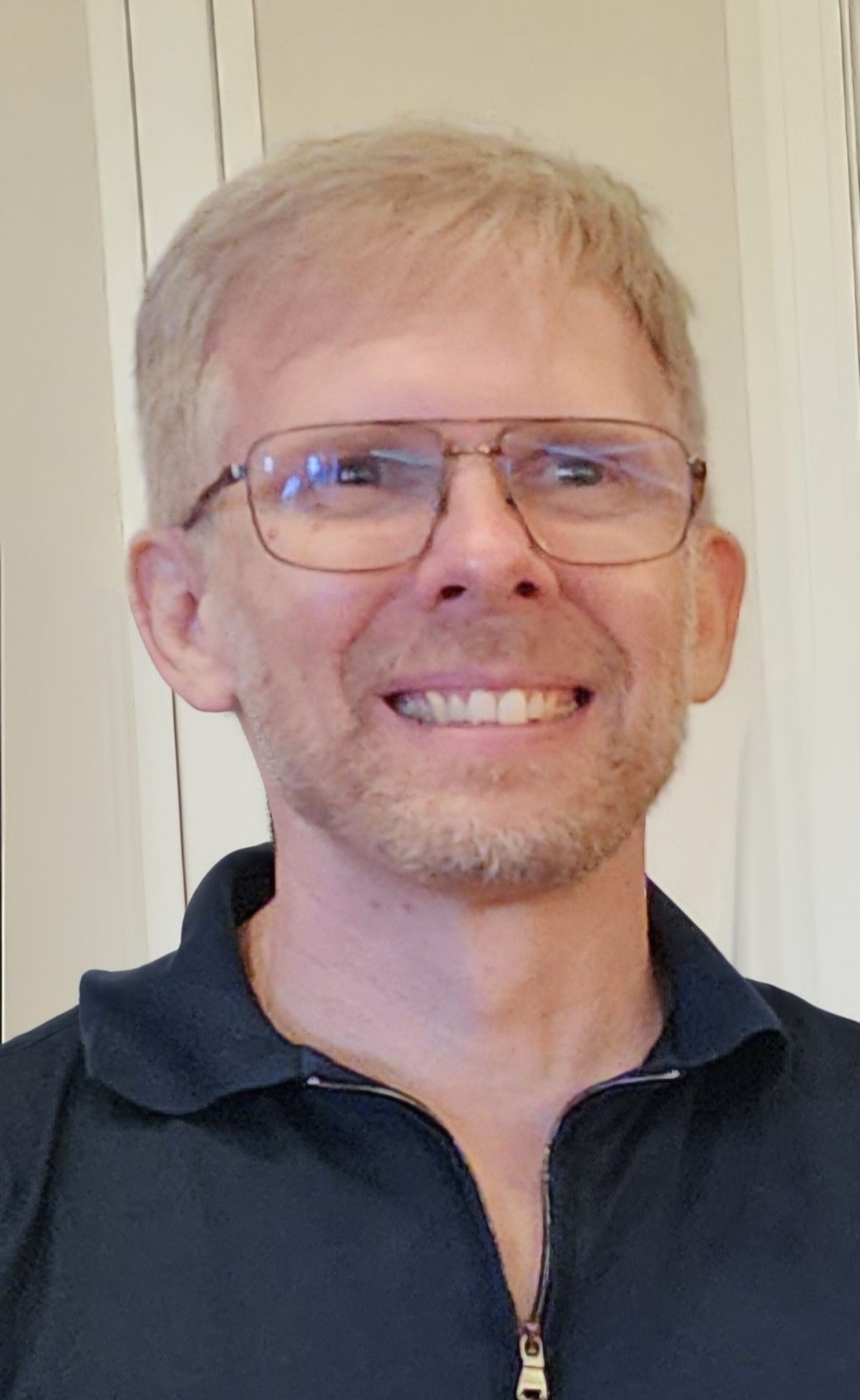
- Carmack in 2025
- Born: August 21, 1970 (age 56) (Note: August 21 according to Carmack himself, but August 20 in other sources); Shawnee Mission, Kansas, U.S.
- Occupations: Computer programmer; video game developer; engineer
- Years active: 1989–present
- Employers: Keen Technologies (2023–present); Oculus VR (2013–2022)
- Known for: Co-founding id Software; Commander Keen, Wolfenstein 3D, Doom, Quake
- Title: Consulting CTO, Oculus VR; Founder, Armadillo Aerospace
- Political party: Libertarian
- Spouse: Katherine Anna Kang (m. 2000; div. 2021)
- Partner: Trista DeLeon (2022–present)
- Children: 2

John D. Carmack II (born August 21, 1970) is an American computer programmer and video game developer. He co-founded the video game company id Software and was the lead programmer of its 1990s games Commander Keen, Wolfenstein 3D, Doom, Quake, and their sequels. Carmack made innovations in 3D computer graphics, such as his Carmack's Reverse algorithm for shadow volumes.

In 2013, he resigned from id Software to work full-time at Oculus VR as their CTO. In 2019, he reduced his role to Consulting CTO so he could allocate more time toward artificial general intelligence (AGI). In 2022, he left Oculus to work on his AGI startup, Keen Technologies.

== Biography ==
=== Early life ===
Carmack was born in Shawnee Mission, Kansas, the son of local television news reporter Stan Carmack. He grew up in the Kansas City metropolitan area, where he became interested in computers at an early age. He attended Shawnee Mission East High School in Prairie Village, Kansas and Raytown South High School in nearby Raytown, Missouri.

Carmack was introduced to video games with the 1978 shoot 'em up game Space Invaders in the arcades during a summer vacation as a child. The 1980 maze chase arcade game Pac-Man also left a strong impression on him. He cited Nintendo designer Shigeru Miyamoto as the game developer he most admired.

As reported in David Kushner's Masters of Doom, when Carmack was 14, he broke into a school with other children to steal Apple II computers. To gain entry to the building, Carmack concocted a sticky substance of thermite mixed with Vaseline that melted through the windows. However, an overweight accomplice struggled to get through the hole and instead opened the window, setting off a silent alarm and alerting police. Carmack was arrested and sent for psychiatric evaluation. He was sentenced to a year in a juvenile home. He attended the University of Missouri–Kansas City for two semesters before withdrawing to work as a freelance programmer.

=== Career ===
Softdisk, a computer company in Shreveport, Louisiana, hired Carmack to work on Softdisk G-S (an Apple IIGS publication), introducing him to John Romero and other future key members of id Software such as Adrian Carmack (no relation). Later, Softdisk would place this team in charge of a new, but short-lived, bi-monthly game subscription product called Gamer's Edge for the IBM PC (DOS) platform. In 1990, while still at Softdisk, Carmack, Romero, and others created the first of the Commander Keen games, a series that was published by Apogee Software, under the shareware distribution model, from 1991 onwards. Afterwards, Carmack left Softdisk to co-found id Software.

Carmack has pioneered or popularized the use of many techniques in computer graphics, including "adaptive tile refresh" for Commander Keen, ray casting for Hovertank 3D, Catacomb 3-D, and Wolfenstein 3D, binary space partitioning which Doom became the first game to use, surface caching which he invented for Quake, Carmack's Reverse (formally known as z-fail stencil shadows) which he devised for Doom 3, and MegaTexture technology, first used in Enemy Territory: Quake Wars. Quake 3 popularized the fast inverse square root algorithm.

Carmack's engines have also been licensed for use in other influential first-person shooters such as Half-Life, Call of Duty and Medal of Honor: Allied Assault. In 2005, Carmack developed his first game for mobile phones, Doom RPG.

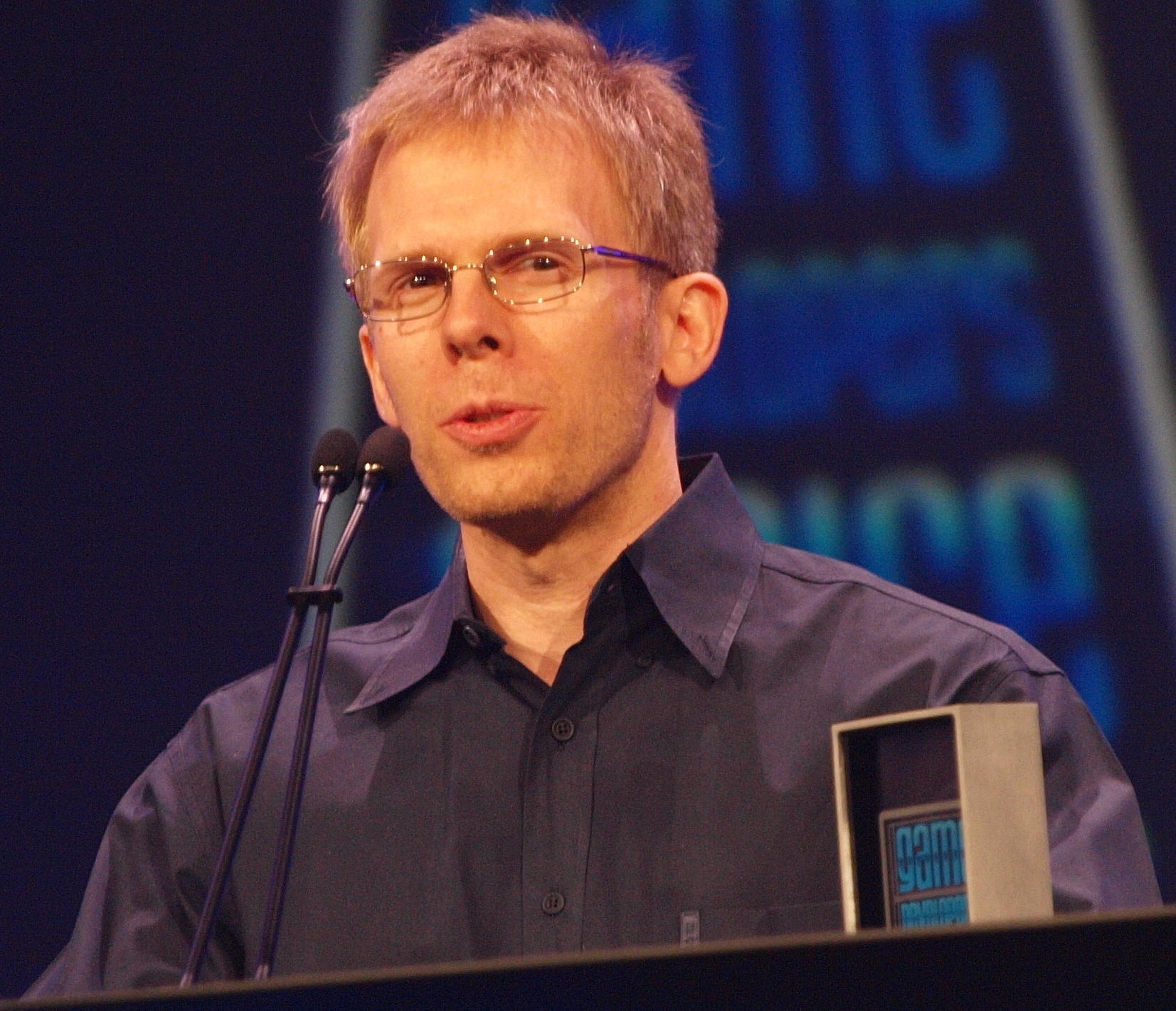
Carmack giving a speech after receiving the Lifetime Achievement Award during the 10th annual Game Developers Choice Awards ceremony on March 11, 2010

On August 7, 2013, Carmack joined Oculus VR as their CTO. On November 22, 2013, he resigned from id Software to work full-time at Oculus VR. Carmack's reason for leaving was that id's parent company ZeniMax Media did not want to support Oculus Rift. Carmack's role at both companies later became central to a ZeniMax lawsuit against Oculus' parent company, Meta (then known as Facebook), claiming that Oculus stole ZeniMax's virtual reality intellectual property. The trial jury absolved Carmack of liability, though Oculus and other corporate officers were held liable for trademark, copyright, and contract violations.

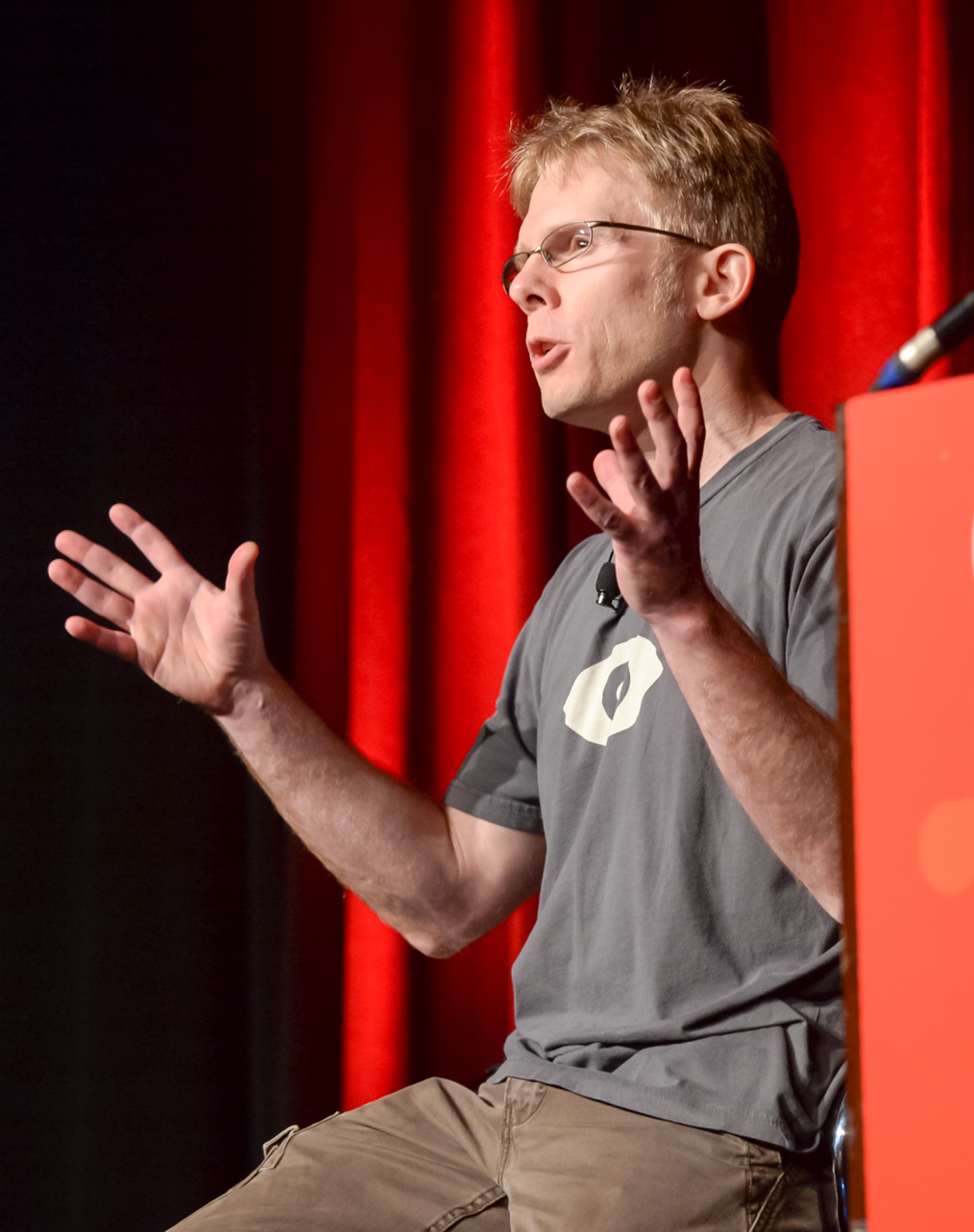
Carmack speaking about "The Dawn of Mobile VR" during the Game Developers Conference 2015

In February 2017, Carmack sued ZeniMax, claiming the company had refused to pay him the remaining $22.5 million (~$29 million in 2025) owed to him from their purchase of id Software. In October 2018, Carmack stated that he and ZeniMax had reached an agreement and that "Zenimax has fully satisfied their obligations to me", ending the suit.

On November 13, 2019, Carmack stepped down from the Oculus CTO role to become a "Consulting CTO" in order to allocate more time to his work on artificial general intelligence (AGI). On August 19, 2022, Carmack announced that he has raised $20M for Keen Technologies, his new AGI company. On December 16, 2022, Carmack left Oculus to focus on Keen.

In September 2023 John partnered with reinforcement learning researcher Richard S. Sutton, though Sutton left in 2026 to launch the AI startup Oak Lab.

=== Workstyle ===
Carmack claims to have maintained a sixty-hour work week, working a 10-hour day, six days a week, throughout his career. He has spoken publicly about the importance of long hours of uninterrupted focus in his work. Not only does high intensity allow him to make progress more quickly, but long hours are also critical to maintaining a focused mindset over time. Despite working such a demanding schedule, he has never experienced burnout.

Carmack is also known for taking week-long programming retreats. These retreats involve a solitary, uninterrupted period away from his normal routine often sequestered in a random city and hotel. The goal of these retreats is to allow Carmack to operate at full cognitive capacity, tackling a specific, difficult problem or learning a new skill. The solitude and physical isolation of these retreats offer an environment for deep focus and reflection, making them an essential part of Carmack's creative process.

Carmack was vocal about his frustration with the bureaucratic inefficiencies he encountered during his time at Meta. In his departure memo, he stated, "We have a ridiculous amount of people and resources, but we constantly self-sabotage and squander effort," he wrote. "I have never been able to kill stupid things before they cause damage, or set a direction and have a team actually stick to it."

Carmack subscribes to the philosophy that small, incremental steps are the fastest route to meaningful and disruptive innovation. He compares this approach to the "magic of gradient descent" where small steps using local information result in the best outcomes. According to Carmack, this principle is proven by his own experience, and he has observed this in many of the smartest people in the world. He states, "Little tiny steps using local information winds up leading to all the best answers."

== Armadillo Aerospace ==
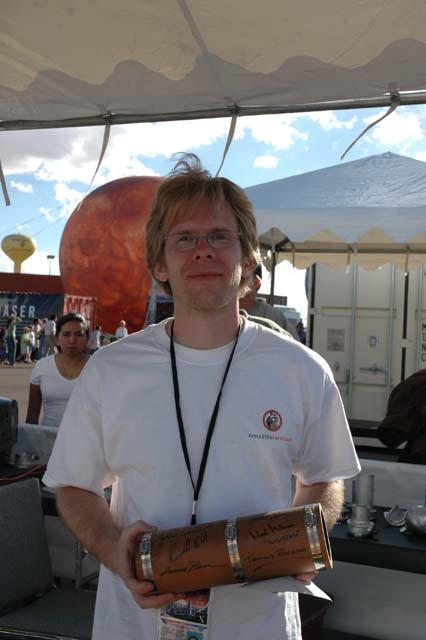
Carmack during the 2005 X PRIZE Cup

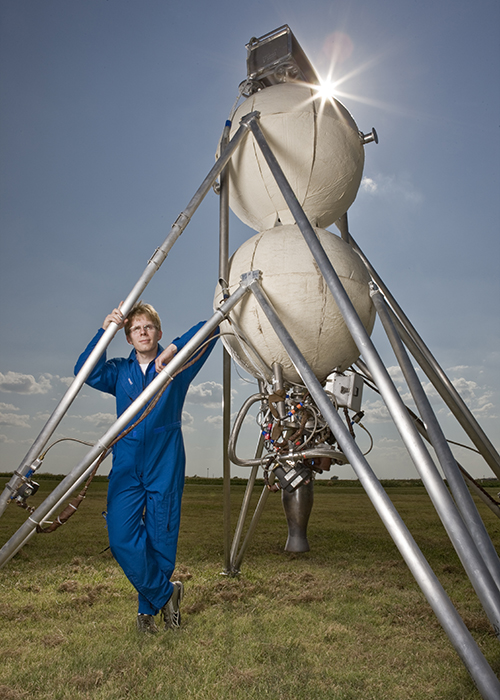
Carmack in 2008

Around 2000, Carmack became interested in rocketry, a hobby of his youth. He began by giving financial support to a few local amateur engineers. Carmack funded the company Armadillo Aerospace out of his own pocket, for "something north of a million dollars a year." The company of hobbyists made steady progress toward their goals of suborbital space flight and eventual orbital vehicles. In October 2008, Armadillo Aerospace competed in a NASA contest known as the Lunar Lander Challenge, winning first place in the Level 1 competition along with $350,000 (~$513,105 in 2025). In September 2009, they completed Level 2 and were awarded $500,000 (~$728,207 in 2025). The company went into "hibernation mode" in 2013.

According to Carmack, the work in the aerospace industry is "simple" compared to the work he does in video games.

== Open-source software ==
Carmack is an advocate of open-source software, and has repeatedly voiced his opposition to software patents, equating them to robbery. He has also contributed to open-source projects, such as starting the initial port of the X Window System to Mac OS X Server and working to improve the OpenGL drivers for Linux through the Utah GLX project.

Carmack released the source code for Wolfenstein 3D in 1995 and the Doom source code in 1997, first under a custom license and then under the GNU General Public License (GPL) in 1999. When the source code to Quake was leaked and circulated among the Quake community underground in 1997 after licensee Crack dot Com was hacked, a programmer unaffiliated with id Software named Greg Alexander used it to port Quake to Linux using SVGALib. As this was more feature rich than Dave Taylor's earlier X11 port, he sent the patches to Carmack. Instead of pursuing legal action, id Software used the patches as the foundation for a company-sanctioned Linux port maintained by new hire Zoid Kirsch, who later ported Quakeworld and Quake II to Linux as well.

id Software has since publicly released the source code to Quake in 1999, Quake 2 in 2001, Quake 3 in 2005 and lastly Doom 3 in 2011 (and later the BFG Edition in 2012). The source code for Hovertank 3D and Catacomb 3D (as well as Carmack's earlier Catacomb) was released in June 2014 by Flat Rock Software with Carmack's blessing. He has since expressed regret on using the copyleft GPL over the more permissive BSD license.

The release of id Tech 4 occurred despite patent concerns from Creative Labs over Carmack's reverse, while the original Doom source release shipped without music due to complications with the Cygnus Studios developed DMX library (which led to the Linux version being selected for release). Carmack has since advised developers to be careful when utilizing middleware, noting how it can limit the possibilities of later releasing source code. Tim Sweeney has implied this issue has hindered potential releases of older Unreal Engine source code.

On the other hand, despite his technical admiration for the system, Carmack has several times over the years voiced a skeptical opinion about Linux as a gaming platform. In 2013, he argued for emulation as the "proper technical direction for gaming on Linux", and in 2014 he voiced the opinion that Linux might be the biggest problem for the success of the Steam Machine.

Carmack contributes to charities and gaming communities. Some of the recipients of Carmack's charitable contributions include his former high school, promoters of open-source software, opponents of software patents, and game enthusiasts.

== Personal life ==
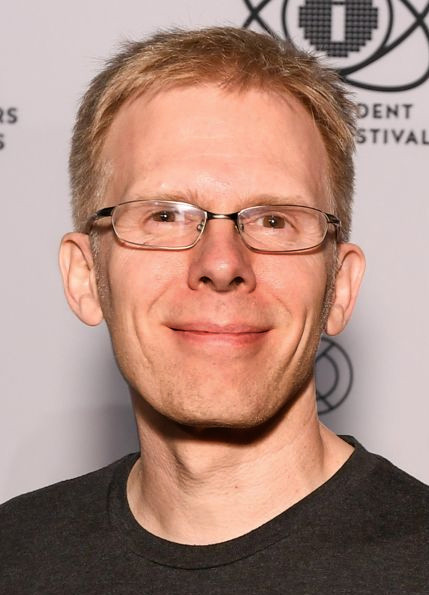
John Carmack at GDCA 2017

Carmack was so successful at id that by mid-1994 he had purchased two Ferraris: a Ferrari 328 and a Ferrari Testarossa. In 1997, he gave away the Ferrari 328 as a prize to Dennis Fong, the winner of the Quake tournament "Red Annihilation".

He met his now ex-wife Katherine Anna Kang at the 1997 QuakeCon when she visited id's offices. As a bet, Kang challenged Carmack to sponsor the first all-female Quake tournament if she was able to produce a significant number of participants. Carmack predicted a maximum of 25 participants, but there were 1,500. Carmack and Kang married on January 1, 2000, and planned a ceremony in Hawaii. Steve Jobs requested that they would postpone the ceremony so Carmack could attend the MacWorld Expo on January 5, 2000. Carmack declined and suggested making a video instead. Carmack and Kang had a son Christopher Ryan in August 2004. Their second son was born in November 2009.

Carmack is divorced as of 2021. On May 26, 2022, he announced his divorce and how he met his partner Trista through the VR Beat Saber games he would host via Twitter.

As a game developer, Carmack differed from many of his contemporaries by avoiding commitment to a final release date for any game he was developing. Instead, when asked for a release date on a new game, Carmack would usually reply that the game would be released "when it's done". Employees at Apogee, in their past years the publishers of games by id Software, adopted this business practice as well. In 2019, as a guest on The Joe Rogan Experience, Carmack stated that his beliefs have changed over time: "I largely recant from that now." On Rage's six-year development time he says: "I think we should have done whatever it would have taken to ship that two years earlier." Carmack also reflected on the internal development of Quake in this regard and described it as "traumatic" and says id Software could have split the game into two parts and shipped it earlier.

Carmack has a blog last updated in 2006 (previously a .plan on id Software's server, under the username johnc), an active Twitter account, and also occasionally posts comments to Slashdot.

Carmack supported the 2012 presidential campaign of Libertarian Ron Paul, and also persuaded the Libertarian Party of Texas to accept bitcoin as an alternative to donations. He is an atheist. During a conversation with Joe Rogan, Carmack revealed that he had trained in Brazilian Jiu Jitsu and Judo for several years as a hobby.

During his time at id Software, a medium pepperoni pizza would arrive for Carmack from Domino's Pizza almost every day, carried by the same delivery person for more than 15 years. Carmack had been such a regular customer that they continued to charge him 1995 prices.

On occasion he has commended the efforts of similarly focused programmers – first Ken Silverman, who wrote the Build engine for 3D Realms, and later with Tim Sweeney of Epic Games, who wrote the Unreal Engine.

== Recognition ==
Accolades for John Carmack
Date	Award	Description
1996	Named among the most influential people in computer gaming of the year and of all time	#1 and #2 in GameSpot's lists.
1997	Named among the most influential people of all time	#7 in Computer Gaming World list, for game design.
1999	Named among the 50 most influential people in technology	#10 in Time's list.
March 2001	Award for community contribution for the Quake 3 engine	Used in 12 games. Bestowed at 2001 Game Developer's Conference Award Ceremony.
March 22, 2001	Inducted into Academy of Interactive Arts and Sciences' Hall of Fame	The fourth person to be inducted, an honor bestowed upon those who have made revolutionary and innovative achievements in the video and computer game industry.
2002	Named to the MIT Technology Review TR100	Included as one of the top 100 innovators in the world under the age of 35.
2003	One subject of book Masters of Doom	Masters of Doom is a chronicle of id Software and its founders.
2005	Name in film	The film Doom featured a character named Dr. Carmack, in recognition of Carmack who co-created the original game.
March 2006	Added to the Walk of Game	Walk of Game is an event that recognizes the developers and games with the most impact on the industry.
January 2007	Awarded 2 Emmy Awards	Carmack and id Software were awarded with two Emmy Awards. The first was Science, Engineering & Technology for Broadcast Television, which includes broadcast, cable and satellite distribution. The second was for Science, Engineering and Technology for Broadband and Personal Television, encompassing interactive television, gaming technology, and for the first time, the Internet, cell phones, private networks, and personal media players. id Software is the first independent game developer to be awarded an Emmy since the Academy began honoring technology innovation in 1948.
September 2007	Television appearance	Appeared on Discovery Channel Canada Daily Planet featuring his rocket designs along with the Armadillo Aerospace team.
2008	Honored	Carmack was honored at the 59th Annual Technology & Engineering Emmy Awards for Quake's pioneering role of user modifiability. He is the only game programmer ever honored twice by the National Academy of Television Arts & Sciences, having been given an Emmy Award in 2007 for his creation of the 3D technology that underlies modern shooter video games. Along with Don Daglow of Stormfront Studios and Mike Morhaime of Blizzard Entertainment, Carmack is one of only three game developers to accept awards at both the Technology & Engineering Emmy Awards and at the Academy of Interactive Arts & Sciences Interactive Achievement Awards.
October 2008	Won X-Prize	Carmack's Armadillo Aerospace won the $350,000 Level One X-Prize Lunar Lander Challenge.
2009	Named among the 100 top game creators of all time	#10 in IGN's list.
March 11, 2010	Lifetime Achievement Award	Was awarded the Game Developers Conference Lifetime Achievement award for his work.
March 7, 2016	BAFTA Fellowship Award	Honoured with the Academy's highest honour, the Fellowship for "work that has consistently been at the cutting edge of games and his technical expertise helping the future arrive that little bit faster".
May 3, 2017	Honorary Doctorate	Received a Doctor of Engineering Honoris Causa from the University of Missouri, Kansas City for "his work in cutting edge tech & comp sci".

== Games ==
Video games worked on by John Carmack
Release date	Game	Developer	Publisher	Credited for
October 16, 2012	Doom 3 BFG Edition	id Software	Bethesda Softworks	Technical director, engine programmer, developer
October 4, 2011	Rage	id Software	Bethesda Softworks	Technical director, engine programmer, developer
September 28, 2007	Enemy Territory: Quake Wars	Splash Damage	Activision	Programming
May 1, 2006	Orcs & Elves	Fountainhead Entertainment	Electronic Arts	Producer/programmer/writer
October 18, 2005	Quake 4	Raven Software	Activision, Bethesda Softworks (republished 2012)	Technical director
September 13, 2005	Doom RPG	Fountainhead Entertainment	id Software	Producer/programmer
April 3, 2005	Doom 3: Resurrection of Evil	Nerve Software	Activision	Technical director
August 3, 2004	Doom 3	id Software	Activision	Technical director
November 19, 2001	Return to Castle Wolfenstein	id Software	Activision	Technical director
December 18, 2000	Quake III: Team Arena	id Software	Activision	Programming
December 2, 1999	Quake III Arena	id Software	Activision	Programming
November 30, 1997	Quake II	id Software	Activision	Programming
March 31, 1997	Doom 64	Midway Games	Midway Games	Programming
June 22, 1996	Quake	id Software	GT Interactive	Programming
May 31, 1996	Final Doom	id Software	GT Interactive	Programming
October 30, 1995	Hexen: Beyond Heretic	Raven Software	id Software	3D engine
December 23, 1994	Heretic	Raven Software	id Software	Engine programmer
September 30, 1994	Doom II: Hell on Earth	id Software	GT Interactive	Programming
December 10, 1993	Doom	id Software	id Software	Programming
1993	Shadowcaster	Raven Software	Origin Systems	3D engine
September 18, 1992	Spear of Destiny	id Software	FormGen	Software engineer
May 5, 1992	Wolfenstein 3D	id Software	Apogee Software	Programming
1991	Catacomb 3-D	id Software	Softdisk	Programming
1991	Commander Keen in Aliens Ate My Babysitter!	id Software	FormGen	Programming
December 15, 1991	Commander Keen in Goodbye, Galaxy!	id Software	Apogee Software	Programming
1991	Commander Keen in Keen Dreams	id Software	Softdisk	Programming
1991	Shadow Knights	id Software	Softdisk	Design/programming
1991	Rescue Rover 2	id Software	Softdisk	Programmer
1991	Rescue Rover	id Software	Softdisk	Programmer
1991	Hovertank 3D	id Software	Softdisk	Programming
1991	Dangerous Dave in the Haunted Mansion	id Software	Softdisk	Programming
1991	Dark Designs III: Retribution	Softdisk	Softdisk	Programmer/designer
December 14, 1990	Commander Keen in Invasion of the Vorticons	id Software	Apogee Software	Programming
1990	Slordax: The Unknown Enemy	Softdisk	Softdisk	Programming
1990	Catacomb II	Softdisk	Softdisk	Developer
1990	Catacomb	Softdisk	Softdisk	Programmer
1990	Dark Designs II: Closing the Gate	Softdisk	Softdisk	Programmer/designer
1990	Dark Designs: Grelminar's Staff	John Carmack	Softdisk	Developer
1990	Tennis	John Carmack	Softdisk	Developer
1990	Wraith: The Devil's Demise	John Carmack	Nite Owl Productions	Developer
1989	Shadowforge	John Carmack	Nite Owl Productions	Developer

== Bibliography ==
- Kushner, David (2003). Masters of Doom: How Two Guys Created an Empire and Transformed Pop Culture. New York: Random House. ISBN 0-375-50524-5.
