= Kelstar =

Kelstar Atari
- Format: diskmag
- Publisher: Bob Kell
- Final issue: February 1997

Kelstar Atari was a British Atari diskmag distributed on Atari ST-compatible floppy disks. Beginning as a one-off spoof diskmag by Bob Kell circulated only among friends, it was picked up as a semi serious diskmag in the PD community of the time so then began life as a diskmag "proper". It ran for 7 issues until February 1997 when it morphed into KelAUG (KELstar Atari Atari User Group), which was created in order to expand the function of the Kelstar collective and take in more active content from its member user base. Still open to the public as a diskmag, members also received compilation disks of Public domain software and tutorials, and accompanying printed newsletters. The editor's chair was then passed around the main contributors of Kelaug for 10 issues until a change of name to "Tryst" for a single issue led to the death knell of Kelaug. Bob Kell then took back the editorship to release two further issues, titled Kelstar II issues 13 and 14, to officially say goodbye and wind up the magazine for good.

Kelstar Atari was founded by and named for Bob Kell with help from his friends, and had a peak distribution of more than 50 copies bi-monthly, although it is possible that further copies were made and distributed informally.

It relied heavily on contributions from its users, and topics included but were not limited to Atari news, games reviews, general discussions and jokes.
