= PC Life =

- Editor: Mike Sullivan
- Categories: Disk magazine
- Frequency: Semi-annually
- First issue: July/August 1986
- Final issue: 1988
- Company: Microstar Graphics, Ltd.
- Country: United States
- Based in: Syracuse, New York
- Language: English
- Website: https://www.pclife.com.tr

PC Life was a disk magazine for the IBM PC published starting in 1986 in Syracuse, New York by publisher and editor Mike Sullivan. In contrast to the mostly text-based disk magazines in existence at the time, PC Life was more graphical and multimedia in style, with various animation and interaction, although the extent of the graphical style was limited by the technology of the time which required that the publication fit on a floppy disk and be compatible with CGA graphics.

PC Life received positive reviews from some critics who found this style attractive, including PC World, which complimented its "spiffy graphics, bright writing, and packaging that's a blend of GQ and Vogue." It was also positively reviewed in PC Magazine (Nov. 24, 1987, "PC-Life: A Vision of the Future,"), with a couple of screenshots. However, others criticized its relative lack of "meaty" content such as complete, usable programs, such as was usually found on other disk magazines. It lasted through 1989, publishing four volumes of up to 5 issues per year.
