= Disk User =

- Cover of issue 3
- Categories: Computing
- Frequency: Bi-monthly
- Founded: 1987
- First issue: June 1987
- Final issue Number: 14
- Country: United Kingdom
- Language: English
- ISSN: 0953-0606
- OCLC: 499042259

Disk User was a bi-monthly magazine for the BBC Micro range of 8-bit microcomputers. The first issue was available from 15 May 1987. Its coverdisks contained graphical demos and pre-release previews of upcoming software.
