= Cassette magazine =

A cassette magazine, or tapezine, is a publication contained entirely on computer-readable media, specifically on cassette. Its content consists of some combination of text, graphics, multimedia, and executable programs, and it is normally specific to one particular computer platform or operating system. The successor to the cassette magazine was the disk magazine.

Early home and hobby users of personal computers in the late 1970s and early 1980s sometimes typed in programs, usually in the BASIC language, which were published in the computer magazines of the time. This was a lot of work and prone to error, so the idea of publishing a magazine directly on a computer-readable medium so that the programs could be run directly without typing came independently to several people.

Some ideas of putting bar codes into paper magazines, which could be read into a computer with the appropriate peripheral, were floated at the time, but never caught on. Since the common data storage medium of the earliest home computers was the audio cassette, the first magazine published on a physical computer medium was a cassette magazine called CLOAD, named after the command to load a program from a cassette on that computer system. Written for the Radio Shack TRS-80 computer users, it began publication in 1978. Shortly afterwards,in July 1978, the first issue of CURSOR magazine was released for the Commodore PET.

CLOAD was not the first electronic periodical, however, because various ARPANET digests had been published as text files sent around the network since the early 1970s. These, however, were pure ASCII text and hence were not cassette magazines or disk magazines by the current definition. Also, at the time, few people outside of academic institutions had access to this forerunner of the Internet.

== See also ==
- Disk magazines
