= Softdisk =

Software and Internet company based in Shreveport, Louisiana

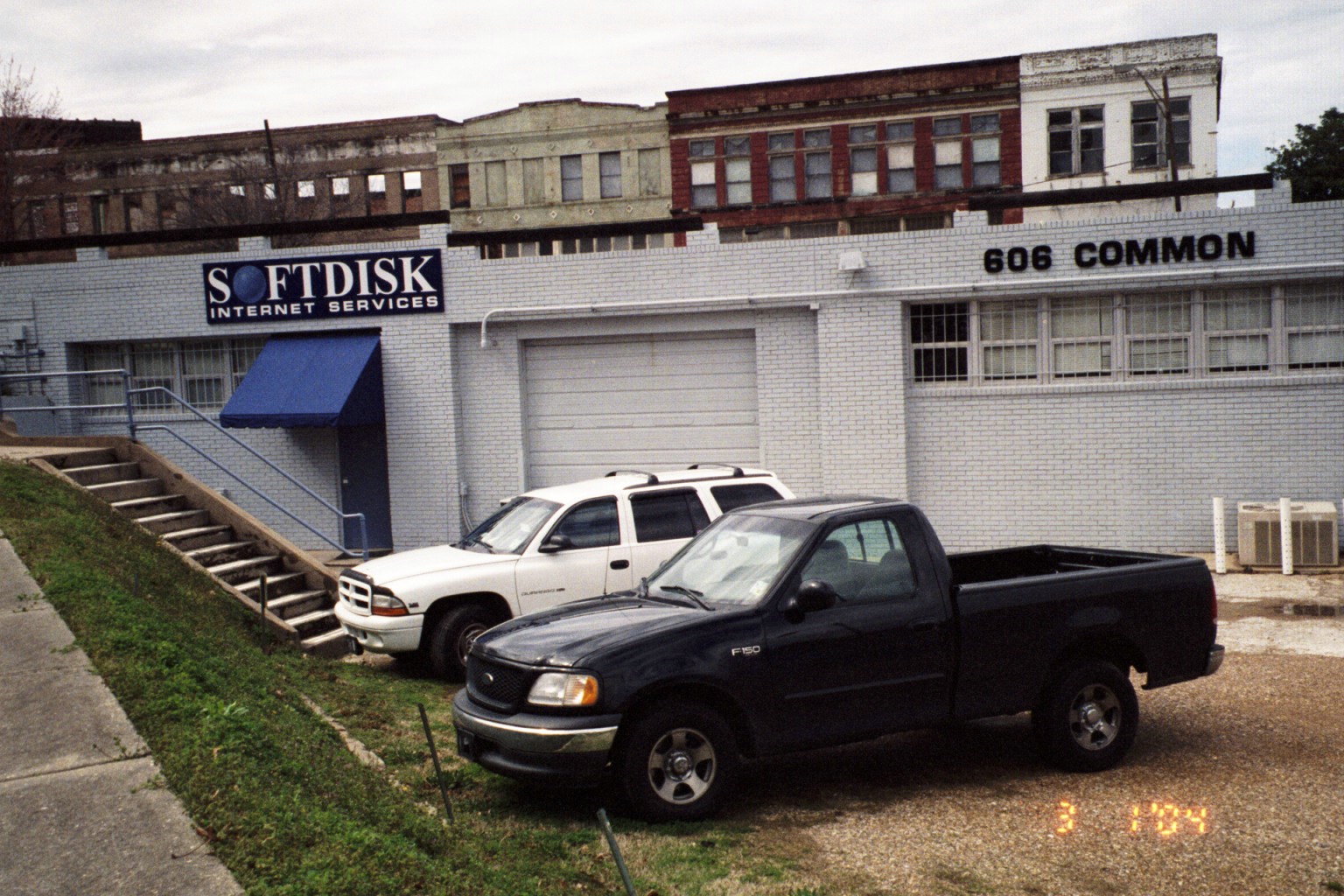
- Headquarters in 2004; these offices were, for the latter part of the company's history, in a converted basement in downtown Shreveport.
- Type: Private
- Industry: Software, Internet
- Founded: 1981
- Defunct: 2016
- Headquarters: Shreveport, Louisiana, U.S.
- Key people: Jim Mangham, Founder; Judi Mangham, Founder; Al Vekovius, Founder, CEO; John Beaird, CEO; John Carmack, Game Programmer; John Romero, Game Programmer & Designer; Tom Hall, Game Designer; Adrian Carmack, Artist; Kevin Cloud, Artist and Manager; Jay Wilbur, Manager
- Products: Disk magazines, video games

Softdisk was a software and Internet company based in Shreveport, Louisiana. Founded in 1981, its original products were disk magazines (which they termed "magazettes", for "magazine on diskette"). It was affiliated and partly owned by paper magazine Softalk at founding, but survived its demise.

The company has been known by a variety of names, including Softdisk Magazette, Softdisk Publishing, Softdisk, Inc., Softdisk Internet Services, Softdisk, L.L.C., and Magazines On Disk.

Softdisk is the former workplace of several of the founders of id Software.

== Publications ==
Publications included Softdisk for the Apple II; Loadstar for the Commodore 64; Big Blue Disk (later On Disk Monthly and Softdisk PC), The Gamer’s Edge, and PC Business Disk for the IBM PC; Diskworld (later Softdisk for Mac) and DTPublisher (specializing in desktop publishing) for the Apple Macintosh; Softdisk G-S for the Apple IIGS; Softdisk for Windows for Microsoft Windows, published from 1994–1999; and Shareware Spotlight, a short-lived publication featuring the best Shareware offerings for IBM PC compatibles. By the late 1990s, these publications were discontinued, although Loadstar had a continued life as an independent company catering to a cult following of Commodore buffs.

=== Big Blue Disk ===
Big Blue Disk was a monthly disk magazine that was published by Softdisk for IBM PC and compatibles that began publication in 1986. It required 256k of memory. Softdisk was sued by IBM for trademark infringement over the use of the name "Big Blue" in 1989.

== Standalone programs and Gamer's Edge ==
Softdisk is most famous for being the former workplace of several of the founders of id Software, who worked on a short-lived game subscription product, Gamer's Edge. Gamer's Edge was a monthly PC game disk started in 1990 by John Romero. The disk's developers were John Carmack, John Romero, and Adrian Carmack. Tom Hall, then a programmer who worked in the Apple II department of Softdisk, would come in at night to help with the game design. Lane Roathe was the editor.

These developers later left Softdisk to found id Software. To complete their contractual obligation to Softdisk, the developers built several more games for Softdisk, including Dangerous Dave in the Haunted Mansion, Rescue Rover, Hovertank 3D, Rescue Rover 2, Tiles of the Dragon, Catacomb 3D and Keen Dreams (the "lost" episode of the Commander Keen series). Softdisk later hired a new team to create new titles using the game engines of the earlier games, including the later founders of JAM Productions who created Blake Stone. This connection led to Softdisk was mentioned extensively in the earlier parts of the id chronicling book Masters of Doom.

Also, some of the earliest employees of Origin Systems worked there before moving on: Greg Malone (Moebius, Windwalker), Dallas Snell (The Quest and Ring Quest), Joel Rea (The Quest and Ring Quest), and Alan Gardner (Windwalker, Ultima VI). Malone also later worked as a producer for 3D Realms.

Softdisk continued to publish video games into the mid-1990s, most notably In Pursuit of Greed, based on an alpha version of the Doom engine derived from Shadowcaster, and Alien Rampage, based on the original Ravager side-scroller once being developed by Apogee.

== Current state ==
Since 1995, Softdisk had been an Internet service provider, web hosting service, and Internet developer as well, and this eventually became their primary area of business. They offered local dialup service in the Shreveport area, and Web hosting and development services.

As of 2006, their website redirected to that of Bayou Internet, which had taken over their Internet operations. The downloadstore.com site formerly owned and operated by Softdisk was later run by Flat Rock Software, which also published former Softdisk product Screen Saver Studio and most of the Gamer's Edge titles (as well as on GOG.com). The source code for Catacomb, Catacomb 3D and Hovertank 3D was released by Flat Rock in June 2014 under the GNU General Public License in a manner similar to those done by id and partners.
