= Loadstar (magazine) =

Disk magazine for the Commodore 64 computer

Issue 53 (1988)

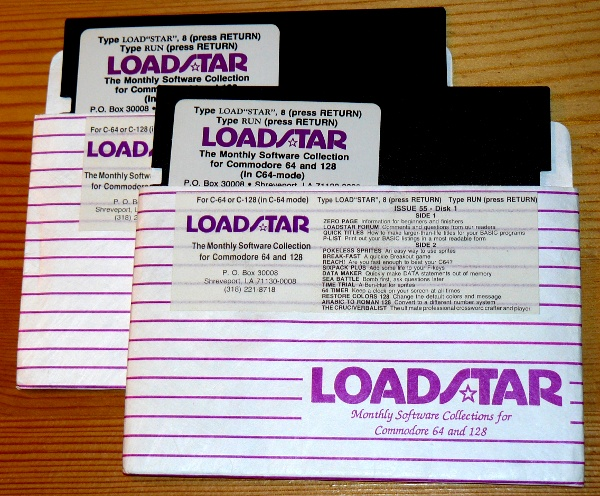
Loadstar disks

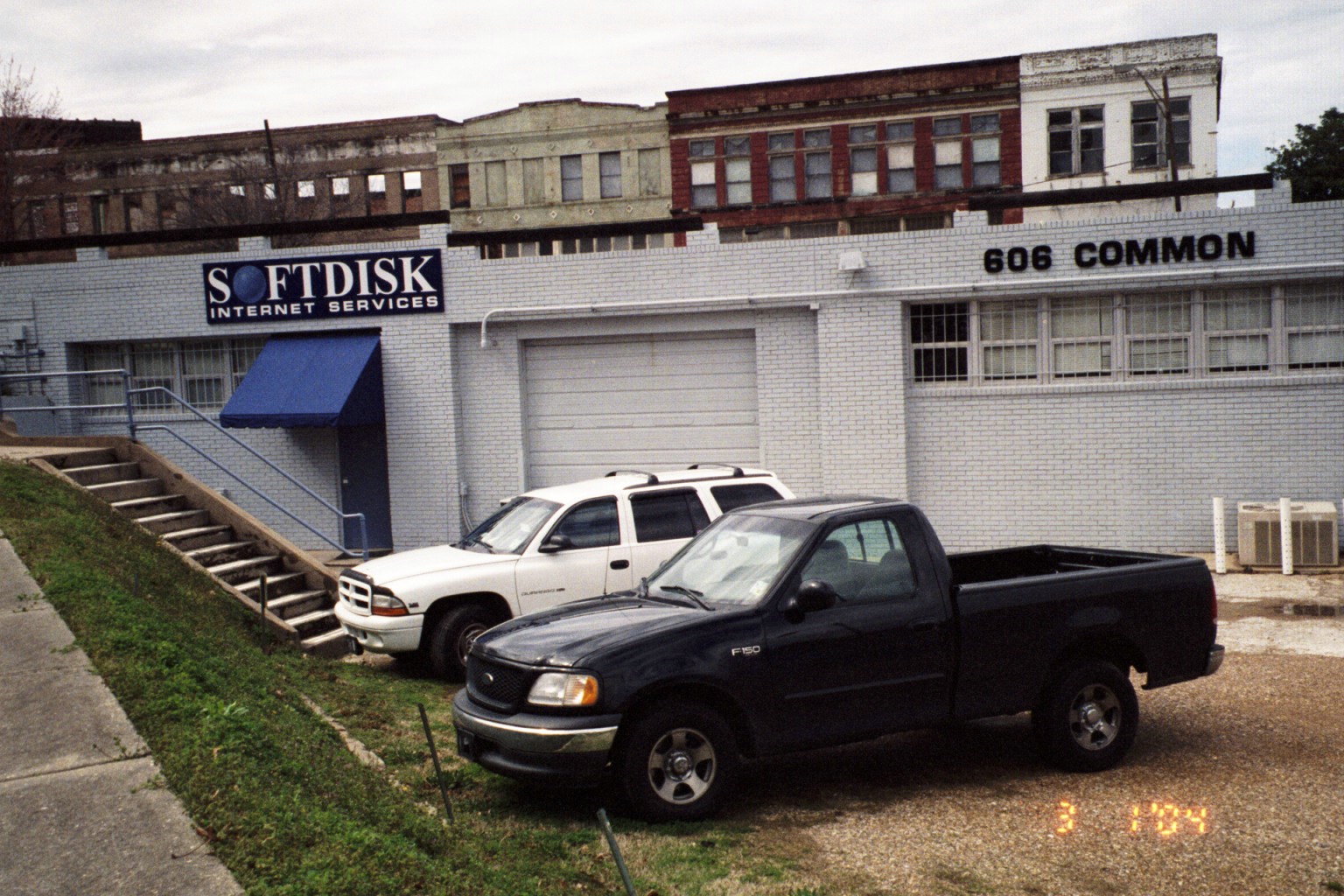
Basement offices where Loadstar was published for much of its history, despite references to the "Loadstar Tower"

Loadstar (ISSN 0886-4144) was a disk magazine for the Commodore 64 computer, published starting in 1984 and ceasing publication in 2007 with its unreleased (until 2010) 250th issue. It derived its name from the command commonly used to execute commercial software from a Commodore 1541 disk: LOAD "*",8,1, with inspiration from the word "lodestar".

Loadstar was launched as a sister publication of Softdisk, based in Shreveport, Louisiana. It was the second platform for which Softdisk produced a disk magazine, after the Apple II. At the time, the Commodore 64 was a very popular home computer due to its inexpensive price and advanced graphics and sound capabilities.

Early issues of Loadstar were produced by the Softdisk staff, most of whom had more experience with Apple than Commodore computers at the time, and much of the content was ported over from the Apple. However, over time, Commodore-specific staff and freelance contributors came aboard.

In addition, Loadstar was the official disk magazine for magazines published by Commodore, including Power/Play and Commodore Magazine. Users could find type-in programs from these publications featured on Loadstar.

In 1987, Fender Tucker was hired as its editor, and he gave Loadstar a distinctive style and atmosphere, including references to a fictional "Loadstar Tower" where it was supposedly published (the offices at the time were in fact in a basement). Loadstar's staff soon expanded to include Jeffrey L. Jones and Scott E. Resh, and the magazine's regular "Puzzle Page" feature - with interactive crosswords, card games, and logic puzzles - was edited by Barbara Schulak.

Under Tucker, a sister publication Loadstar 128 was launched for the Commodore 128 personal computer. This magazine was quarterly. Jones contributed to the Loadstar Letter, a printed publication which accompanied issues of Loadstar.

In 1989, Loadstar published DigitHunt, a number-puzzle game which was apparently the first home computer implementation of Sudoku.

A notable feature in some early issues is the inclusion of a disk with software to access the then-new online service Quantum Link, which had been fervently pitched to Loadstar by head of marketing Steve Case. The company that ran this service eventually turned into America Online.

As the years went by and the Commodore 64 was increasingly regarded as an obsolete computer, the resources of the company were shifted to software for more current systems such as Windows and the Macintosh, and later to the Internet. However, Loadstar held on, and ultimately outlasted the disk magazines for newer platforms. When Softdisk no longer wished to support it, it was spun off as an independent company, J&F Publishing, co-owned by Tucker and his wife, Judi Mangham, who was a co-founder of Softdisk. It has continued to be published, well into the 2000s, for a cult-following audience of old-time Commodore buffs and for people who use Commodore 64 emulators on other platforms.

In January, 2001, Dave and Sheri Moorman of Holly, Colorado, took over as editors. It remained in publication until 2008, in several formats including "classic" Commodore 1541 floppy disks and e-mailed files in C-64 emulator format. An official Web site exists, but not at the earlier loadstar.com address, which as of 2024 now belongs to a logistics company.

J&F Publishing still officially owns it, but the editing and distribution had been franchised to the Moormans' company, eTower Marketing, with Dave Moorman editing the monthly magazines and Sheri Moorman handling business matters. Tucker is now concentrating on other ventures such as republishing the books of Harry Stephen Keeler under his Ramble House imprint.

249 issues of Loadstar were published. It was scheduled to cease publication with issue 256 with Dave Moorman kindly making issue 248 a free pass-around issue in November 2007. However, Dave Moorman moved on in 2008, leaving his last issue 250 unpublished. After another Loadstar assistant finished editing it, issue 250 was unofficially released in June 2010.
