= David Kushner (writer) =

American writer

David Kushner is an American writer who has contributed to many publications, including Wired, The New York Times, Rolling Stone, Spin, IEEE Spectrum and Salon.

== Career ==
From 1994 to 1996, Kushner worked as a senior producer and writer on the SonicNet website.

== Works ==
The first edition of Kushner's non-fiction book, Masters of Doom, was published in 2003. His second non-fiction book, Jonny Magic and the Card Shark Kids, was published in 2005. Kushner's book, Levittown: Two Families, One Tycoon, and the Fight for Civil Rights in America's Legendary Suburb, was published in 2009.

=== Jacked: The Outlaw Story of Grand Theft Auto ===
In 2012, his narrative non-fiction book Jacked: The Outlaw Story of Grand Theft Auto was published. Jacked provided an inside look at the inner-workings of the video game company Rockstar Games, makers of the controversial Grand Theft Auto series, and attorney Jack Thompson's attempt to destroy it. The book served as the basis for the film The Gamechangers.

=== Alligator Candy ===
Kushner's 2016 autobiography, Alligator Candy, describes the abduction and murder of his preteen brother, Jonathan Kushner. One of the individuals convicted for murder, Johnny Paul Witt, was executed in 1985 by the State of Florida after a lengthy appeal (see Wainwright v. Witt). David Kushner's book investigates details of the murder and describes the emotional trauma this inflicted on the family.

=== Silk Road ===
Kushner's 2014 Rolling Stone article "Dead End on Silk Road: Internet Crime Kingpin Ross Ulbricht's Big Fall" is the basis for 2021 film Silk Road.

=== Zola ===
Kushner's 2016 Rolling Stone article "Zola Tells All: The Real Story Behind the Greatest Stripper Saga Ever Tweeted" has been adapted into the 2021 film Zola.

== Bibliography ==
=== Books ===
- The Players Ball: A Genius, a Con Man, and the Secret History of the Internet’s Rise (2019)
- Rise of the Dungeon Master: Gary Gygax and the Creation of D&D (2017)
- Alligator Candy: A Memoir (2016)
- The World's Most Dangerous Geek: And More True Hacking Stories (2016)
- Prepare to Meet Thy Doom: And More True Gaming Stories (2015)
- The Bones of Marianna: A Reform School, a Terrible Secret, and a Hundred-Year Fight for Justice (2013)
- Jacked: The Outlaw Story of Grand Theft Auto (2012)
- Levittown: Two Extraordinary Families, One Ruthless Tycoon, and the Fight for the American Dream (2009)
- Jonny Magic and the Card Shark Kids: How a Gang of Geeks Beat the Odds and Stormed Las Vegas (2005)
- Masters of Doom (2003)
- A for Anonymous: How a Mysterious Hacker Collective Transformed the World

=== Essays and reporting ===
- Kushner, David (May 2015). "Why 4chan's overlord walked away : Christopher Poole's website made him an unlikely teenage celebrity - then it spun out of control". Rolling Stone (Australia). 762: 68–71.
- My AI Mother: Artificial intelligence may not replace my job. But could it replace my mother? (March 2025)

=== Podcasts ===
- Alligator Candy

== Filmography ==
- The Gamechangers (2015)
- Zola (2021)
- Silk Road (2021)
