= Masters of Doom =

2003 book about video game company's co-founders

Masters of Doom: How Two Guys Created an Empire and Transformed Pop Culture
- Author: David Kushner
- Language: English
- Genre: History
- Publisher: Random House
- Publication date: May 6, 2003 (hardcover); May 11, 2004 (paperback); May 15, 2012 (audiobook)
- Publication place: United States
- Media type: Print (hardcover); Print (paperback); Audiobook
- Pages: 352 (hardcover); 368 (paperback)
- ISBN: 0-375-50524-5 (hardcover); 0-8129-7215-5 (paperback)
- OCLC: 50129329
- Dewey Decimal: 794.8/092/2 B 21
- LC Class: GV1469.15 .K87 2003

Masters of Doom: How Two Guys Created an Empire and Transformed Pop Culture is a 2003 book by David Kushner about video game company id Software and its influence on popular culture, focusing on co-founders John Carmack and John Romero. The book details the company's early years, the success of their franchises such as Doom, and the professional relationship between Carmack and Romero. The book also covers Romero's firing, and the founding and eventual collapse of his game studio Ion Storm.

Upon release, Masters of Doom received positive reviews from critics. The book would later influence Palmer Luckey to establish the technology company Oculus VR, and Alexis Ohanian and Steve Huffman to found Reddit. There have been two attempts to adapt the book: a television movie on Showtime, and a pilot episode greenlit by USA Network in 2019 for a potential series.

== Background ==
David Kushner was a contributor for news outlets such as The New York Times, Rolling Stone, and Wired. A fan of video games, Kushner saw an opportunity to write a book about the games industry, choosing to focus on John Carmack and John Romero as he considered their careers as "a great story waiting to be told". As the book was his first, he spent five years on research. He moved to Dallas, Texas to conduct interviews with the subjects, sometimes continuing the interviews late into the night. Basing his writing technique on Tom Wolfe's 1979 book The Right Stuff, Kushner wrote every line of dialogue and internal monologue based on the interviews the he had conducted with the subjects.

== Content ==
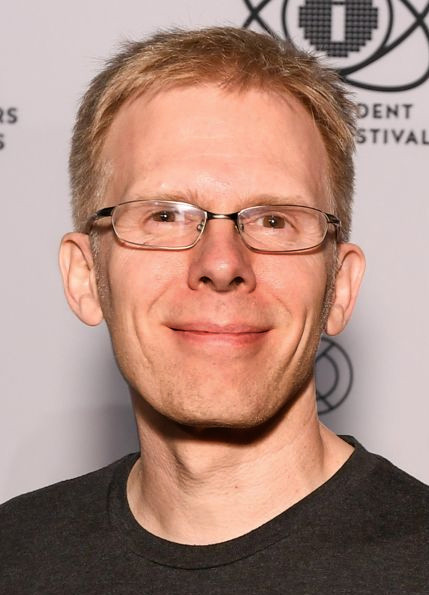
John Carmack

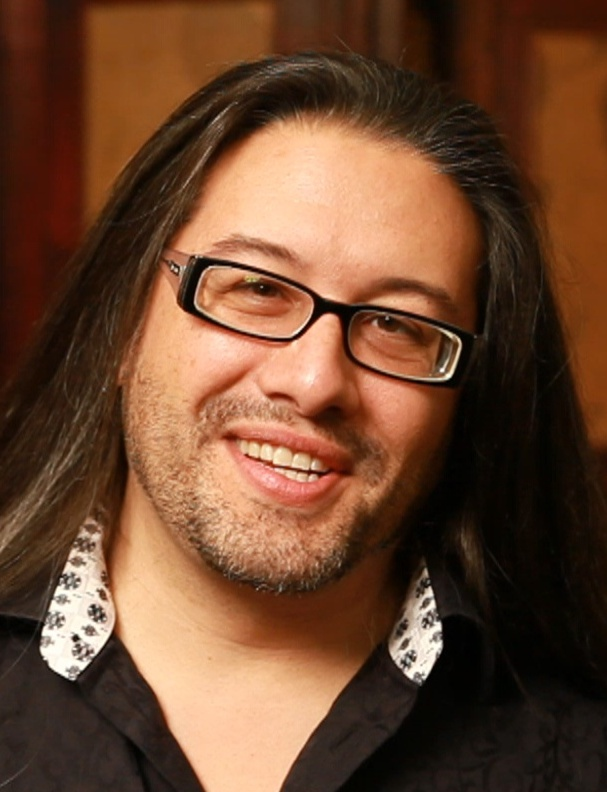
John Romero

Masters of Doom focuses on id Software's co-founders John Carmack and John Romero.

The book describes the respective childhoods of the "two Johns", their first meeting at Softdisk in 1989, and the eventual founding of their own company, id Software. It discusses in detail the company's first successes: the critically and commercially successful Commander Keen and Wolfenstein 3D games. The company's fortunes continued to rise with the release of Doom, which provided unprecedented success, fame, and notoriety. The book then discusses id's next project, Quake, the aftermath of Romero's departure from the company, and his founding and the eventual collapse of the studio Ion Storm. Kushner describes the new gamer culture created by Doom and its impact on society.

The games are discussed in detail, but Kushner's main focus is the corporate culture that enabled their creation. He describes Carmack and Romero as the driving forces of id Software, but with very different personalities. Romero is presented as having unbridled creativity and considerable skill, but losing focus when the spectacular success of the games allowed him to adopt a rock star-like public persona. Carmack is depicted as an introvert, whose unparalleled programming skills are the core of id Software, enabling the company to create extremely sophisticated games. However, he has little interest in – or even understanding of – the social niceties that enable people to enjoy working together.

Much of the book concentrates on this dynamic. The "two Johns" initially complement each other well, but eventually interpersonal conflicts develop, leading Romero to be fired. Carmack, the skilled creator of the complicated game engines the company's products use, is repeatedly referred to as the only person in the company who is not expendable, and this gives him a great degree of authority and influence. However, this influence transforms id Software into a considerably less pleasant and fun place to work and causes its games to become increasingly repetitive, though technologically sophisticated. Romero is on the opposite end of the spectrum; Ion Storm is intended to be a very fun place to work, where "[game] design is law," and where technology must be created to realize the designer's vision, instead of the other way around. However, his lack of management and organizational focus leads to financially disastrous results.

Although Kushner adopts a novel-like narrative, Masters of Doom is a work of video game journalism. According to his notes in the book, it is based on hundreds of interviews conducted over a six-year period. Kushner was an early entrant into the field of video game journalism, and included some of his own original reporting first published in other sources into the book.

== Publication ==
Masters of Doom: How Two Guys Created an Empire and Transformed Pop Culture was first published in May 2003 by Random House in hardcover and ebook form. Random House released an excerpt of the book before its release. Random House later negotiated a deal with UK publisher Piatkus, releasing a trade paperback in autumn 2003. An audiobook version of Masters of Doom was published in 2012 by Audiobooks.com, narrated by Wil Wheaton.

== Reception ==
Kushner has cracked open the dark world of John Carmack and John Romero, the authors of the blockbuster computer games Wolfenstein 3D, Doom, and Quake. Reading this fascinating underground tale is as addictive as the games themselves.

— David Seigfried, Booklist

Seth Mnookin for The New York Times called the book "an impressive and adroit social history", positively remarking on its pacing and detail. Jeff Jensen for Entertainment Weekly gave it a "B" rating, praising the book's depiction of the breakdown of Carmack and Romero's relationship but criticising the sentimentality of the ending. Thomas L. McDonald for Maximum PC praised its prose and its representation of the subjects, and Edge described the book as being akin to a Greek drama without the pathos, adding that the story was "a cautionary tale of relationships in the games industry". Hardcore Gaming 101 considered the book "a highly entertaining and quite informative read", Scott Juster for PopMatters praised Kushner's extensive research and interviews of Carmack and Romero, and Kirkus Reviews summarized the book as "laudable coverage of an undeniably important, unsettling cultural transition."

Salon contributor Wagner James Au, while declaring the book to be "excellent", criticized David Kushner for giving too much credit to the technical merit of Catacomb 3-D in comparison to Ultima Underworld. Ann Donahue for Variety considered the character study of "the two Johns" to be interesting but thought the book had "problematic tunnel vision" by rarely taking a broader look at the impact Doom had outside of the gaming industry. Computer Gaming World's Charles Ardai called it "clumsily written but nonetheless compelling". Publishers Weekly considered Kushner to have given too much leeway about the violence in the games, and criticized the narration as dry in parts of the book. Since its release, the book has been on several lists of the "best video game books." In 2023, Chris Plante of Polygon termed it "arguably the most popular work of nonfiction about video game development".

=== Lawsuit ===
In 2005, former Ion Storm chief executive officer (Note: Sources inaccurately claimed Mike Wilson to be Ion Storm's COO rather than its CEO.) Michael Wilson sued publisher Random House Inc., claiming the book falsely alleged that he purchased a BMW with funds from id Software. Wilson sought $50 million in damages, with further punitive damages from the publisher. A spokesperson for Random House issued a statement announcing the publishing company's support of David Kushner. The suit was dismissed with prejudice by joint request of Wilson and Random House in October of the same year.

== Legacy ==
Palmer Luckey, the founder of the technology company Oculus VR, first became interested in virtual reality after reading Masters of Doom. John Carmack later left id Software in 2013 to join Oculus as chief technology officer. In a 2013 blog post, Alexis Ohanian revealed that the book inspired him and Steve Huffman to start a company, which resulted in them founding Reddit.

In 2016, Kushner released an audiobook follow-up titled Prepare to Meet Thy Doom and More True Gaming Stories. The book is a compilation of Kushner's long-form journalism which includes a "where-they-are-now" article on Carmack and Romero, and like Masters of Doom, was recorded as an audiobook by Wil Wheaton. In 2021, Kushner wrote in a Substack post that he was writing a sequel to Masters of Doom. Titled Masters of Disruption: How the Gamer Generation Built the Future, Kushner planned to serialize the book in his newsletter and include new interviews with Carmack and Romero.

Since its publication, there have been two attempts to adapt the book. A film adaptation was first conceived in 2005, when it was announced that producer Naren Shankar was planning a television movie for Showtime based on the story. The movie never materialized beyond the initial announcement. In June 2019, USA Network greenlit a pilot episode of a potential series based on the book, to be written and produced by Tom Bissell under James and Dave Franco's Ramona Films label. Which was filmed in Kearny, New Jersey at Kearny Point. The show, planned as an anthology series, would feature Eduardo Franco as Romero, Patrick Gibson as Carmack, and star John Karna, Jane Ackermann, Siobhan Williams, and Peter Friedman, and be directed by Rhys Thomas. In 2020, it was reported that the pilot was in post-production by Gotham Group, though as of 2025 no further announcement has been made.

== See also ==
- List of books about video games
