= Softdisk (disk magazine) =

Computer disk magazine

Retail package of Softdisk #27 (1984)

Softdisk (ISSN 0886-4152), originally Softdisk Magazette, was a disk magazine for the Apple II computer line, published from 1981 through 1995. It was the first publication of the company that was also known as Softdisk, which would go on to publish disk magazines for other systems, other software, and later be involved in Internet access, hosting, and development.

== History ==
The brainchild of Jim Mangham, who then worked at the LSU Medical Center in Shreveport, Louisiana, Softdisk (originally intended to be called The Harbinger Magazette, but launched as Softdisk Magazette, with "magazette" being a portmanteau word combining "magazine" and "diskette") was published out of Mangham's house, with his then-wife Judi Mangham, LSUMC co-worker Al Vekovius, and Softalk magazine (a paper magazine for the Apple) as partners in the venture.

The first issue was published in September, 1981, and consisted of a single 5.25" floppy diskette which could be flipped over to get to content on the back side. There was fairly little content on the first issue, and it was mostly repeated on the second issue, so later when issue numbers were retroactively assigned for the purpose of back issue sales the October, 1981 issue was designated as "Softdisk #1", with the preceding month's issue considered either "#0" or unnumbered.

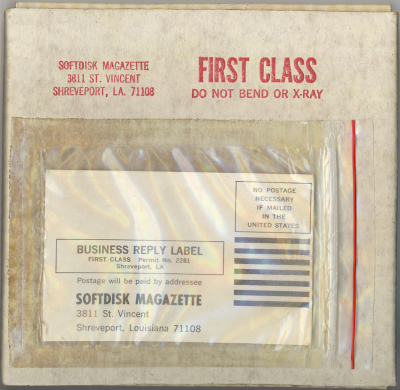
Reusable mailer used to send early issues of Softdisk

Originally, the subscribers had to send back the previous month's disk when the following issue was received; reusable mailers were used for this purpose, with a postage-paid return address label on the flip side of the address label used for outbound mailing, which was inserted in a plastic Ziploc baggie on the outside of the mailer so it could be reversed by the recipient. This disk return requirement was due in part to the fact that floppy disks were more expensive in those days and needed to be reused for economy, but was also designed to allow the subscribers to participate by leaving feedback electronically on the returning disks, as well as article and program submissions.

At first, the only payment for published material was in the form of coupons for free issues (subscriptions were on a month-to-month basis, with subscribers enclosing payment for the next issue along with returning disks; the price was $5 per issue at first), though eventually monetary payments were instituted. There was quite a bit of submitted material even before there was any financial incentive to participate; similarly to later projects such as open-source software and wikis, Softdisk found a community of willing participants with motives other than making money.

As the publication grew and evolved, however, it became more conventional and "mainstream", losing some of its early quirky flavor and the community that developed around it; ultimately, it was more of a normal commercial publication, sold on an annual subscription basis and in retail stores, with a paid staff and contracted freelancers to produce material, and without any disk-return requirement.

Within the Apple II platform, Softdisk spawned Softdisk G-S for the Apple IIGS computer in 1989; Softdisk G-S lasted until 1997. It took advantage of the improved graphic and sound capabilities of the IIGS over earlier Apple models. Diskworld for the Macintosh (later Softdisk for Mac) was also published, and eventually Softdisk was redesigned to have a similar user interface, with many of the same staff people working on both the Mac and Apple II products. The original publication continued past the time when most people in the computer field regarded the Apple II as obsolete, but eventually ended publication in August, 1995 with issue #166 (at which point then-editor Peter Rokitski was putting it out practically singlehandedly), survived by disk magazines for other computer lines such as the Macintosh and Windows which lasted a few more years before the entire line of Softdisk disk magazines was terminated.

== See also ==
- List of disk magazines
