= Disk magazine =

Electronic magazine to be read using computers

A disk magazine, colloquially known as a diskmag or diskzine, is a magazine that is distributed in electronic form to be read using computers. These had some popularity in the 1980s and 1990s as periodicals distributed on floppy disk, hence their name. The rise of the Internet in the late 1990s caused them to be superseded almost entirely by online publications, which are sometimes still called "diskmags" despite the lack of physical disks.

== Defining characteristics ==
A unique and defining characteristic about a diskmag in contrast to a typical ASCII "zine" or "t-file" (or even "g-file") is that a diskmag usually comes housed as an executable program file that will only run on a specific hardware platform. A diskmag tends to have an aesthetically appealing and custom graphical user interface (or even interfaces), background music and other features that take advantage of the hardware platform the diskmag was coded for. Diskmags have been written for many platforms, ranging from the C64 on up to the IBM PC and have even been created for video game consoles, like scenedicate for the Sega Dreamcast.

== History ==
=== Precursors ===
Early home and hobby users of personal computers in the late 1970s and early 1980s sometimes typed in programs, usually in the BASIC language, which were published in the computer magazines of the time. This was a lot of work, and prone to error, so the idea of publishing a magazine directly on a computer-readable medium so that the programs could be run directly without typing came independently to several people.

Some ideas of putting bar codes into paper magazines, which could be read into a computer with the appropriate peripheral, were floated at the time, but never caught on. Since the common data storage medium of the earliest home computers was the audio cassette, the first magazine published on a physical computer medium was actually a cassette magazine rather than a disk magazine; CLOAD magazine, for the Radio Shack TRS-80 computer, began publication in 1978, named after the command to load a program from cassette on that computer system.

CLOAD was not the first electronic periodical, however, because various ARPANET digests had been published as text files sent around the network since the early 1970s. These, however, were pure ASCII text and hence were not diskmags by the current definition. Also, at the time, few people outside of academic institutions had access to this forerunner of the Internet.

=== 1980s ===
In September, 1981, the first issue of Softdisk was published for Apple II computers; coming out monthly on a 5¼" diskette, this was the first floppy-disk-based periodical. This was the first publication of a company also known as Softdisk which would later bring out similar publications for the Commodore 64, IBM PC, and Apple Macintosh. Of these magazines, the one for the Commodore 64, called Loadstar, continued publishing until issue 249 in 2007 - making it the longest running disk software magazine in history. Other publishers produced a variety of competing publications, including Diskazine, Window, I.B.Magazette, UPTIME, and PC Life. The Atari ST, in 1986, saw the first disk magazine in the shape of ST News. This was an English-language on-disk magazine from the Netherlands. Some publishers of paper magazines published disk companions, either polybagged with the magazines (in the form of so-called covermounts) or available as separate subscriptions.

=== 1990s ===
In the early 1990s, id Software founders John Carmack and John Romero had some of their earliest works published on disk magazines while working for Softdisk. A short-lived game subscription called Gamer's Edge published side-scrolling and 3D games written by the team that would later create Commander Keen and Doom.

By the mid-1990s, CD-ROMs were taking over from floppy disks as the major data storage and transfer medium. Some of the existing disk magazines switched to this format while others, such as Digital Culture Stream, were founded as CD-based magazines from the start. The higher capacity of this format, along with the faster speed of newer computers, allowed disk magazines to provide more of a multimedia experience, including music and animation. Such things as movie trailers and music samples could now be provided, allowing a disk magazine to target fans of the entertainment industry rather than the computer hobbyists of the earlier times.

Many disk magazines of the 1990s and later are connected with the demoscene, including Grapevine, for the Amiga computer. Demoscene diskmags have been known to cross over into the closely neighboring underground computer art scene and warez scenes as well. Some of the more commonly well known English diskmags include: Hugi, Imphobia, Pain, Scenial, Daskmig (IBM PC), Jurassic Pack, RAW, Upstream, ROM, Seenpoint, Generation (Amiga), Undercover Magascene, Chaos Control Digizine, Maggie, DBA Diskmagazine, Alive and ST News (Atari ST).

In the late 1990s, the Internet became popular among the general public, which had the effect of killing the market for disk-based publications because people could now access the same sorts of material through the net. As a result, disk-based periodicals became uncommon, as publishers of electronic magazines preferred to use the Web or e-mail as their distribution medium.

Demoscene magazines based on executable program files are still commonly called diskmags, although they are seldom distributed on physical disks any more. Bulletin board systems and the Internet took over as major distribution channels for these magazines already in the 1990s.

=== 2000s ===
The occasional CD- or DVD-based multimedia magazine has come out since 2000, though more often as a promotional gimmick than a self-sustaining publication. More effort has lately gone into creating and promoting Web sites, ezines, blogs, and email lists than physical-medium-based publications. Some publications that are termed "diskmags" are today distributed through the internet (FTP, World Wide Web, IRC, etc.). The former entertainment disk magazine Launch transformed into the online video site LAUNCHcast, owned by Yahoo!. Blender also began life as a CD-ROM diskmag with US-wide distribution. It later transitioned to print. However, with the popularity of tablet computers and portable e-book readers, some print publications are transitioning to electronic form, and other all-electronic publications are starting up.

The longest-lasting disk magazine is, surprisingly enough, for the long-obsolete Commodore 64 computer; Loadstar, originally published by Softdisk starting in 1984, and later an independent company, has continued publishing well into the 2000s for a "cult following" of Commodore buffs.

== Types of content ==
Disk magazines differed in the sorts of material they emphasised. Several distinct sorts of things could be published in an electronic periodical, and different ones might have all or most of their content in one or another of these categories:

- "Static" articles similar to those of paper magazines, including text and illustrations (though, if that's all that is present in a publication, it is usually termed an "e-zine" or "ASCII-zine" rather than a "disk magazine")
- Multimedia features such as video and audio
- Interactive features such as quizzes and surveys. In some cases you could send disks back to the publisher with your responses and other feedback so that it could be published in a later issue, making it into a (rather slow) user forum.
- Software you could run or install; either original software created by staff or freelancers specifically for the publication and usable unrestrictedly by the subscribers, or copies of freeware, shareware, or "crippleware" that might be limited in functionality unless the customer pays more for a registered copy
- Files and add-ons to be used with other software, such as clip art, sound clips, and fonts.

== See also ==
- List of disk magazines
