= List of Softdisk games =

Softdisk was a software and Internet company based in Shreveport, Louisiana. Founded in 1981, its original products were disk magazines (which they termed "magazettes", for "magazine on diskette"). It was affiliated and partly owned by paper magazine Softalk at founding, but survived its demise.

== Games ==
=== Released ===
Game	Release	Developer	Publisher	Ref.
Miner!	1985 (C64)	Softdisk	Code Works	
Brickwar	1986 (DOS)	Softdisk	Softdisk	
Actionauts	1986 (C64)	Advanced Program Technologies	Softdisk	
1000 Miler	1987 (C64, DOS)	Softdisk	Softdisk	
Anna's Gram	1987 (Apple II, C64, DOS)	Softdisk	Softdisk	
Paragon	1988 (C64), 1990 (Apple II), 1991 (DOS)	Softdisk	Softdisk	
Kingdom of Kroz	1988 (DOS)	Apogee Software	Softdisk	
States and Capitals	1988 (DOS)	Softdisk	Softdisk	
Crazy Eights	1988 (DOS)	Softdisk	Softdisk	
The Computer Quiz	1988 (DOS)	Softdisk	Softdisk	
Flippy's Circus Coins	1988 (DOS)	Softdisk	Softdisk	
Maze Runner	1988 (DOS)	Apogee Software	Keypunch Software	
The Astronomy Quiz	1988 (DOS)	Softdisk	Softdisk	
The Lost Crown of Queen Anne	1988 (C64, DOS)	Robert Wayne Atkins	Softdisk	
Same or Different	1989 (Apple II, DOS)	Softdisk	Softdisk	
Legends of Murder: Volume 1 - Stonedale Castle	1989 (DOS)	Softdisk	Softdisk	
Meteors	1989 (DOS)	Apogee Software	Softdisk	
Digithunt	1989 (C64)	Softdisk	Softdisk	
Block Five	1989 (DOS)	Softdisk	Keypunch Software	
Melee	1989 (C64)	Softdisk	Softdisk	
How to Weigh an Elephant	1989 (DOS)	Softdisk	Softdisk	
Magic Boxes	1989 (Apple II, DOS)	Softdisk	Softdisk	
Zappa Roidz	1989 (Apple II, DOS)	Ideas From the Deep	Softdisk	
The IBM BASIC Quiz	1989 (DOS)	Softdisk	Softdisk	
Life in the Fast Lane	1989 (DOS)	Softdisk	Softdisk	
Four Card Solitaire	1989 (DOS)	Softdisk	Softdisk	
Proto Type	1989 (DOS)	Softdisk	Softdisk	
Dungeons of Kroz	1989 (DOS)	Apogee Software	Softdisk	
Squares	1989 (DOS)	Softdisk	Softdisk	
Submarine	1989 (DOS)	Softdisk	Softdisk	
Boxzum	1989 (DOS)	Softdisk	Softdisk	
Darts	1989 (DOS)	Softdisk	Softdisk	
Caverns of Kroz	1989 (DOS)	Apogee Software	Softdisk	
Twilight Treasures	1989 (DOS)	Ideas From the Deep	Softdisk	
Dark Designs I: Grelminar's Staff	1990 (Apple II), 1991 (DOS)	Softdisk	Softdisk	
Dark Designs II: Closing the Gate	1990 (Apple II), 1991 (DOS)	Softdisk	Softdisk	
Shadow Knights	1990 (DOS)	id Software	Softdisk	
Sub Stalker	1990 (Apple II)	Ideas From the Deep	Softdisk	
Dino-Sorcerer	1990 (Apple II, DOS)	Softdisk	Softdisk	
Catacomb	1990 (DOS), 1991 (Apple II, Apple IIgs)	PC Arcade	Softdisk	
Alfredo's Stupendous Surprise	1990 (Apple II)	Softdisk	Softdisk	
Corsair	1990 (C64)	Softdisk	Softdisk	
Pyramids of Egypt	1990 (DOS)	Capitol Ideas Software	Uptime Disk Monthly	
Dangerous Dave in the Deserted Pirate's Hideout!	1990 (DOS)	Uptime Disk Monthly	Uptime Disk Monthly	
Wizard's Doom: Fifty Levels of Exquisite Torture	1990 (C64)	Softdisk	Softdisk	
Chagunitzu	1990 (DOS)	Softdisk	Softdisk	
Galactic Battle	1990 (DOS)	Softdisk	Softdisk	
Pixel Puzzler	1990 (DOS)	Softdisk	Softdisk	
Accordion	1990 (DOS)	Softdisk	Softdisk	
FourSide	1990 (DOS)	Softdisk	Softdisk	
Kid's Kards	1990 (DOS)	Softdisk	Softdisk	
Return to Kroz	1990 (DOS)	Apogee Software	Softdisk	
Scramble	1990 (DOS)	Softdisk	Softdisk	
Rescue Rover	1990 (DOS), 1993 (Apple IIgs)	id Software	Softdisk	
Dark Designs III: Retribution!	1991 (Apple II)	Softdisk	Softdisk	
Hovertank 3D	1991 (DOS)	id Software	Softdisk	
Zig Zag Flag Shag	1991 (Apple II, DOS)	Softdisk	Softdisk	
Commander Keen in Keen Dreams	1991 (DOS)	id Software	Softdisk	
Rescue Rover 2	1991 (DOS)	id Software	Softdisk	
Slordax: The Unknown Enemy	1991 (DOS)	Softdisk	Softdisk	
Catacomb II	1991 (DOS)	Softdisk	Softdisk	
Dangerous Dave in the Haunted Mansion	1991 (DOS)	Gamer's Edge, id Software	Softdisk	
Word Ladders	1991 (DOS)	Softdisk	Softdisk	
Handy Caps	1991 (DOS)	Softdisk	Softdisk	
Xenopods	1991 (DOS)	Gamer's Edge	Softdisk	
American Sign Language Tutor	1991 (DOS)	Softdisk	Softdisk	
Missing Dots Matrix	1991 (DOS)	Softdisk	Softdisk	
Legends of Murder II: Grey Haven	1991 (DOS)	Softdisk	Softdisk	
Change Maker	1991 (DOS)	Softdisk	Softdisk	
Catacomb 3-D	1991 (DOS)	id Software	Softdisk	
Pyramid Solitaire	1991 (DOS)	Softdisk	Softdisk	
Deep Sea Diver	1992 (DOS)	Softdisk	Softdisk	
Dangerous Dave Returns	1992 (Apple II)	Softdisk	Softdisk	
Catacomb Abyss	1992 (DOS)	Gamer's Edge	Softdisk	
Cyberchess	1992 (DOS)	Gamer's Edge	Softdisk	
Curse of the Catacombs	1993 (DOS)	Softdisk	Froggman	
Terror of the Catacombs	1993 (DOS)	Softdisk	Froggman	
Dave Goes Nutz	1993 (DOS)	Softdisk	Softdisk	
Tiles of the Dragon	1993 (DOS)	Softdisk	Softdisk	
ScubaVenture: The Search for Pirate's Treasure	1993 (DOS)	Apogee Software	Softdisk	
Dangerous Dave's Risky Rescue	1993 (DOS)	Gamer's Edge	Softdisk	
Dark Designs IV: Passage to Oblivion	1994 (Apple II)	Softdisk	Softdisk	
Dark Designs V: Search for Salvation	1994 (Apple II)	Softdisk	Softdisk	
Dark Designs VI: Restoration	1994 (Apple II)	Softdisk	Softdisk	
Aces Up	1994 (C64)	Softdisk	Softdisk	
Dangerous Dave Goes Nutz!	1995 (Apple II)	Softdisk	Softdisk	
Elkinloor	1995 (DOS)	Softdisk	Softdisk	
Yote: An African Board Game	1995			
In Pursuit of Greed	1996 (DOS)	Mind Shear Software	Softdisk	
Vor Terra	1996 (DOS)	Softdisk	Softdisk	
Alien Rampage	1996 (DOS)	Inner Circle Creations	Softdisk	

=== Big Blue compilations ===
Compilation	Release	Games & software	Ref.
#1	Nov 1986	Hop-a-long Hangman Planet of the Robots	
#2			
#3	Jan 1987	Triangle Trouble African Desert Campaign	
#4	Feb 1987	Cribbage Squares The Voting Game	
#5	Mar 1987	SuperDots Movie Mogul	
#6			
#7			
#8	Jun 1987	Brickwar Thousand Miler South American Trek	
#9			
#10	Aug 1987	Rainbow	
#11	Sep 1987	Willy the Worm Part 2	
#12			
#13			
#14			
#15	Jan 1988	Go-Mo-Ku Monkey's Uncle	
#16	Feb 1988	Murder in the Museum Klondike	
#17	Mar 1988	Casino Craps Puzzle 15	
#18	April 1988	Canfield PC Puzzle	
#19	May 1988	Kitadel Network	
#20	Jun 1988	Kingdom of Kroz States and Capitals	
#21	Jun 1988	Crazy Eights The Computer Quiz	
#22	Aug 1988	Frigate	
#23	Sep 1988	Western	
#24	Oct 1988	Poker Solitaire	
#25	Nov 1988	Color War Super Cube	
#26	Dec 1988	Maze Runner Flippy's Circus Coins	
#27	Jan 1989	Dungeon of Shalan Square Dare	
#28	Feb 1989	Four Card Solitaire Life in the Fast Lane The IBM BASIC Quiz The Lost Crown of Queen Anne	
#29	Mar 1989	Proto Type Dungeons of Kroz Squares	
#30	Apr 1989	Submarine Meteors	
#31	May 1989	"21" For 1 to 4	
#32	Jun 1989	Darts Block Five Boxzum	
#33	Jul 1989	Hearts Starship Encounter	
#34	Aug 1989	SuperYot	
#35	Sep 1989	Caverns of Kroz Twilight Treasures Anna's Gram	
#36	Oct 1989	Zappa Roidz Poker Slot Machine	
#37	Nov 1989	None	
#38	Dec 1989	Legends of Murder Volume 1: Stonedale Castle	
#39	Jan 1990	Galactic Battle	
#40	Feb 1990	Accordion Pixel Puzzler	
#41	Mar 1990	Kid's Kards FourSide	
#42	Apr 1990	Make-a-Melody Play-a-Melody	
#43	May 1990	Wari	
#44	Jun 1990	Chagunitzu	
#45	Jul 1990	How to Weigh an Elephant The Panda Workout LHX Attack Chopper (Demo)	
#46	Aug 1990	Kono Pyramids of Egypt	
#47	Sep 1990	Castle of Kroz Scramble	
#48	Oct 1990	Computer Crytographer Red Dog	
#49	Nov 1990	Mu Torere	
#50	Dec 1990	Catacomb	
#51	Jan 1991	Pachinco	
#52	Feb 1991	Dark Designs I Rock& Scroll	
#53			
#54	Apr 1991	Dark Designs II: Closing The Gate Word Ladders Handy Caps	
#55	May 1991	American Sign Language Tutor Legends of Murder II: Grey Haven Missing Dots Matrix	
#56	Jun 1991	Zig Zag Flag Shag	
