= Loot Drop =

Social video game studio

- Type: Private
- Industry: Interactive entertainment
- Founded: 2010
- Founder: John Romero; Brenda Romero
- Defunct: 2015
- Successor: Romero Games
- Headquarters: San Mateo, California

Loot Drop was a social video game studio that was started in San Mateo, California. It was created by John Romero and Brenda Romero with veteran game designer Tom Hall heading up his own game. Its tagline was "Believe in fun".

== Formation ==
After creating the social game Ravenwood Fair, John and Brenda Romero left Lolapps to co-found Loot Drop and begin making social games. Due to the success of Ravenwood Fair, several companies were interested in signing a game development and publishing deal with them. RockYou was the first publisher to get to contract. The game that John Romero was developing was titled Cloudforest Expedition. Four months into development, RockYou signed a second development deal with Loot Drop.

The studio got funding for Cloudforest Expedition from social game publisher RockYou in 2011. Within a year, Loot Drop had four titles in development with multiple social game publishers. Romero stated that he wanted to focus on game design rather than monetizing players. The studio was stated to have four teams that would grow to 10 or 11 employees each.

== Studio closing ==
The studio encountered financial trouble in 2012, with the game Tom Clancy's Ghost Recon: Commander being cancelled only five months after launch. This resulted in that development team being laid off. They failed to fund a Kickstarter campaign for an "Old-School RPG". Loot Drop continued developing games until the end of 2015. In its existence, it had developed games for RockYou, Electronic Arts, Ubisoft, Mogol, and Zynga.
