= Romero Games =

Irish video game studio

Romero Games Ltd.
- Type: Private
- Industry: Video games
- Predecessor: Loot Drop
- Founded: August 11, 2015; 11 years ago
- Founders: John Romero; Brenda Romero
- Headquarters: Galway, Ireland
- Subsidiaries: Night Work Games
- Website: romerogames.com

Romero Games Ltd. is an Irish independent video game development studio, based in Galway, Ireland. It was established on 11 August 2015 by husband-and-wife team John Romero and Brenda Romero. This is the ninth game studio established by John Romero in his career, and has currently released four titles.

== History ==
Following his departure from Ion Storm in July 2001, John Romero worked to establish Monkeystone Games in 2001 with Tom Hall before departing to help establish Gazillion Entertainment in 2005. John Romero and Brenda Romero married on 27 October 2012. Together, they worked on Ravenwood Fair, with John Romero as Lead Designer and Brenda as Creative Director and Game Designer. They also founded social game development company Loot Drop in November 2010, and worked on Cloudforest Expedition and Ghost Recon Commander together. They moved to Ireland and together they established Romero Games Ltd. on 11 August 2015.

The studio's first game was an HD, re-skinned Dangerous Dave in the Deserted Pirate's Hideout which added new graphics and music to the classic platformer that he had designed and released in 1990, but was released on mobile. The studio's second game, Gunman Taco Truck, was released on 28 January 2017 on Steam (Windows and Mac) and for iPhone and Android devices.

Night Work Games, a subsidiary of Romero Games, has been developing a first-person shooter titled Blackroom since 2016. On November 23, 2019, it was reported that Romero was still working on Blackroom.

The studio announced in March 2017 that several prominent indie game developers had joined the team at Romero Games to work on a new title that has not yet been announced. Empire of Sin, a role-playing game set in the Prohibition era, was revealed at E3 2019. The game was released on 1 December 2020 to "mixed or average reviews" from critics, according to review aggregator Metacritic.

On 19 July 2022 Romero Games announced that they were starting work on an original, new AAA FPS IP with Unreal Engine 5. Microsoft announced a 4% reducing of staff across the entire organization in July 2025, affecting about 9000 workers. This included the cancellation of several games within Xbox Game Studios and the termination of funding for Romero's project, which led Romero Games to lay off an undisclosed number of employees and seek a new publisher. By October 2026, Romero affirmed he had found a new publisher for the game, and while he was able to rehire many that had been let go, he had to redesign the game to adjust for the smaller team size that he had.

== Games ==
Year	Name
2015	Dangerous Dave in the Deserted Pirate's Hideout HD
2017	Gunman Taco Truck
2019	SIGIL
2020	Empire of Sin
2023	SIGIL 2
Cancelled	Blackroom
Cancelled	Unannounced FPS title
