= Sigil (video game mod) =

2019 Doom episode

- Publishers: Romero Games; Bethesda Softworks (2019 add-on and 2024 release)
- Designer: John Romero
- Composers: James Paddock and Buckethead
- Series: Doom
- Engine: Doom engine Unity (2019 add-on); KEX Engine (2024 release)
- Platforms: Windows, Nintendo Switch, PlayStation 4, PlayStation 5, Xbox One, Xbox Series X/S, Android, iOS
- Release: Windows; May 31, 2019; Switch, PS4, Xbox One, Android, iOS; October 23, 2019; PS5, Xbox Series X/S; August 8, 2024
- Genre: First-person shooter

Sigil (stylized as SIGIL) is the quasi-unofficial fifth episode of the 1993 video game Doom. Published by Romero Games on May 31, 2019, the Megawad was created by an original co-creator of Doom, John Romero, independently of the main game's then-current owner, Bethesda Softworks. It has nine missions, each with a deathmatch version, and a new soundtrack created by James Paddock and Buckethead. While initially released independently, Bethesda later released the episode as a patch for the console ports of Doom.

== Gameplay ==
As an episode of Doom, Sigil has the same gameplay, with no new graphics, sounds, enemies, weapons, or power-ups. Romero said that he wished to make the levels more difficult than in previous episodes, while feeling as though they would have belonged in the original game. Its architectural style differs from the previous episodes, with a liberal placement of lava, floor cracks, pentagrams, and other elements of a more hellish atmosphere.

I wanted the levels to feel like they belong to the original game as if they were a true fifth episode. There's more detail in the levels than episodes 1–4, but not overly so. I believe that people playing the Sigil Megawad will recognize my design style, but see new things I'm doing because this episode does not take place on a military base – it takes place in Hell, which is new to me within Doom's design space. There's a massive room in E5M6 that is the coolest room I've created in any map.

— John Romero

== Plot ==
Sigil's level design often blocks the player's path, by requiring them to find and shoot an eyeball to proceed.

The original four episodes of Doom lead to Sigil as the fifth episode, set in Hell. After Sigil, Doomguy goes to fight demons on Earth in Doom 2: Hell on Earth. Like the rest of the Doom episodes, the only in-game story comes at the end.

John Romero provides exposition for Sigil on its website: "After killing the Spider mastermind at the end of E4M8 ("Unto the Cruel"), your next tour of duty is eliminating the hellspawn that is causing unimaginable carnage in Earth's cities. But Baphomet glitched the final teleporter with his hidden sigil whose eldritch power brings you back to even darker shores of Hell. You fight through this stygian pocket of evil to confront the ultimate harbingers of Satan, then finally return to become Earth's savior. In summary, rip and tear!"

== Development ==
In 2016, John Romero created two single-level WADs "Tech Gone Bad" and "Phobos Mission Control" to positive response. He expressed interest in creating a full-sized episode in time for Doom's 25th anniversary. From 2017 to 2018, Romero created Sigil using Doom Builder, mostly during vacation and evenings.

The December 10, 2018 trailer for the episode said that release was scheduled for February 2019. He promoted it that month by live streaming an early version of it on Twitch. On May 11, the episode was said to have been completed for "quite a while at this point".

The logo came from Baphomet, a pre-existing painting by Christopher Lovell, which was itself derived from the Sigil of Baphomet. Brenda Romero found the image online, and it was promptly selected.

Romero Games produced collector's editions, with extra content such as a signed copy of the game, a shirt with the game's logo, and a documentary about the game's creation. Starting in June 2019, Sigil merchandise became permanently available in the Romero Games store.

Due to production issues, it was not released until May 22, when it was bundled with a soundtrack by Buckethead for the symbolic price of €6.66. It was released for free, with James Paddock's MIDI soundtrack, on May 31.

James Paddock had been modding Doom since 2005, having created more than 200 WADs and 600 MIDIs. In 2019, the same year Sigil's release, he was given his fourth Cacoward for "lifetime achievement".

In January 2020, Bethesda Softworks added Sigil to the existing releases of Doom, Doom II, and Final Doom on the Switch, Xbox One, PlayStation 4, and mobile platforms as an add-on, developed by Nerve Software and running on Unity. It would later be added as part of the 2024 release of Doom and Doom II, developed by Nightdive Studios and running on the KEX Engine, which was released on August 8, 2024.

== Reception ==
Writing for Bit-Tech, Rick Lane said: "Overall, I liked Sigil a heck of a lot more than I expected to. It's far more than just a solid tribute to a classic; it compounds and heightens all of the elements that made the original great, resulting in a rare example of a long-delayed follow-up that makes a significant contribution to the original work." Other reviewers gave praise for the game's elaborate and creative usage of the basic assets available in Doom. Criticism was given to the slower pace, and its general difficulty, which was considered unforgiving for players not already familiar with Doom.

Sigil was a runner-up in the 2019 Cacowards, where it was described as "the most anticipated, previewed, played, pored over, replayed, analyzed, praised, and shat on release of the year".

== Sequel ==
In 2021, Romero stated that he began working on a sequel to Sigil, titled Sigil II, originally meant to run on top of Doom II, but later decided to have it also run on top of the original Doom. It was released on December 10, 2023, for Doom's 30th anniversary as an add-on for the 2019 release of Doom and Doom II, developed by Nerve Software and using Unity. It was later added as a mod and then changed to be a full official game on the 2024 re-releases of Doom and Doom II, developed by Nightdive Studios and running on the KEX Engine.
