= Alien Rampage =

1996 video game

- Developer(s): Inner Circle Creations
- Publisher(s): Softdisk
- Designer(s): Christopher Simms; James Simms
- Platform(s): MS-DOS
- Release: December 30, 1996
- Genre(s): Run and gun
- Mode(s): Single-player

Alien Rampage is a 1996 run and gun video game developed by Inner Circle Creations and published by Softdisk for MS-DOS.

== Gameplay ==
The game was noted for its high level of violence.

The protagonist is an alien named Krupok whose spaceship was destroyed by Untharian scavengers and has crash-landed on the surface of a planet. The objective is to locate the Untharian base and repair the spaceship.

Alien Rampage is a side-scrolling run and gun game. There are 21 levels featuring parallax scrolling. The levels are divided into three "episodes", each containing seven levels. The shareware version includes the first episode. The game features seven weapons (assault rifle being the starting weapon) which can be bought from an arms dealer as the player progresses in the game.

== Development and release ==
Alien Rampage was developed by Inner Circle Creations, a game developer founded in early 1995 by brothers Christopher and James Simms who lived in Louisiana at the time, the same state Softdisk was based in. The game was originally developed by Apogee Software as Ravager until it was cancelled, sold to Inner Circle Creations, and renamed to Alien Rampage. The shareware version was released on October 11, 1996. The full version was released on December 30, 1996. The game was available as a download and CD-ROM.

Piko Interactive released an emulated version for Linux, macOS, and Windows in 2017. The release uses the DOSBox emulator. In 2024, the game was released on the Antstream Arcade streaming platform.

== Reception ==
Reception

Review scores
Publication	Score
Computer Games Magazine	3/5
Computer Life	4/5
Hacker	77%

In a preview, PC Top Player called the graphics attractive, the controls were compared to Prince of Persia. The game's appearance was said to be similar to Opera Soft's Sol Negro (1988).

Hacker called the game imaginative but occasionally frustratingly difficult. The game was praised for its technical performance, for running smoothly on lower hardware specifications. Computer Games Strategy Plus summarized: "this is solid, classic gaming, with fierce action, fun and diverse levels, and good control." The save system was remarked as annoying. Next Generation called it a fun side-scrolling action game with excellent parallax scrolling, although they noted the game as somewhat outdated. MikroBitti liked the graphics and the low system requirements but said the level design is too straightforward. CD Expert said the graphics are conventional but are sufficient for portraying the game's scenery. The player character was noted for looking similar to the Predator alien from the film series. PC Collector called it a fun platform game. PC Team said the game's most unique feature is the high level of gore and violence. They noted the sound effects for enhancing the action effectively.

In December 1997, the game ranked among the top ten most popular titles at Softdisk's online store.

== See also ==
- List of Softdisk games
