= The Lost Crown =

The Lost Crown may refer to:

- Prince of Persia: The Lost Crown, a video game
- The Lost Crown: A Ghost-Hunting Adventure, a graphic adventure video game
- The Lost Crown of Queen Anne, a text-based adventure computer game
- "Lost Crown of Genghis Khan", an episode of the animated television series DuckTales

== See also ==
- Dark Souls II: The Lost Crowns, a set of downloadable content packs for Dark Souls II
