= UpTime (disk magazine) =

UpTime was a group of disk magazines for a variety of personal computing platforms that were published in the 1980s. Bill Kelly started UpTime in his father's basement in 1984. The first issue was published in October 1984. Versions were issued for the Apple II, Macintosh, IBM PC, Commodore 64, and Amiga systems. Among the software that was published there were some of the earliest games created by John Romero. The magazine ceased publication in December 1988.

== Notable releases ==
=== Apple II ===
- Bongo's Bash
- Dangerous Dave
