= Gauntlet: Seven Sorrows =

2005 video game

- Developer: Midway Studios San Diego
- Publisher: Midway
- Producer: David Kunkler
- Designers: Sal DiVita; Mark Simon
- Programmers: Boris Batkin; Mark Johnston
- Artist: Murphy Michaels
- Composers: Inon Zur; Jason Graves; Alexander Brandon
- Series: Gauntlet
- Engine: RenderWare
- Platforms: PlayStation 2, Xbox
- Release: NA: December 12, 2005; AU: February 28, 2006; EU: March 24, 2006
- Genres: Hack and slash, dungeon crawl
- Modes: Single-player, multiplayer

Gauntlet: Seven Sorrows is the follow-up to Gauntlet Legends and Gauntlet Dark Legacy. It uses fantasy fighting action with the strategic role-playing collecting and customization elements for solo play, co-op and an online community. Multiplayer on Xbox Live was available to players until April 15, 2010. Gauntlet Seven Sorrows is now playable online again on the replacement Xbox Live servers called Insignia.

== Gameplay ==
The game features the four original heroes: the wizard, the elf, the warrior, and the valkyrie, each wielding many combos and special attacks that can be purchased at the end of each world removing the dull look of a single attack and adding a nice level of detail. Unlike the previous Gauntlet game, Gauntlet Dark Legacy, there are only four characters, with no unlockable hidden characters and no character appearance customization available. There is also no longer a central hub world where players can upgrade their characters and choose which world to enter next. Upgrading is instead done at the end of each world, and cannot be accessed from the menu, nor is there a shop where items can be purchased.

== Plot ==
Centuries ago, four immortal heroes were gathered together to serve the emperor. He trusted their advice but sought their immortality, so his six great advisors used this against him, and tricked him into crucifying the heroes on a great tree at the bottom of the world. Afterwards, the emperor regretted this act, and yet committed six other sorrows before he was killed by his trusted advisors. However, before his death, he undid his first great sorrow and released his loyal heroes from the tree. Mysteriously set free, the heroes now must set out to destroy the emperor's twisted advisors, transformed into monstrous creatures by stealing the heroes immortality, and set right the emperor's six other sorrows. If the ancient heroes cannot undo the emperor's deeds on their own, his mad plans may tear apart the world. The heroes set out to destroy the emperor, but there are some complications and all their powers are taken away, from there, it is up to the player to gain the powers back and destroy the emperor.

== Development ==
Industry veterans John Romero and Josh Sawyer initially spearheaded Midway's San Diego studio, intent on reviving the Gauntlet action role-playing game (RPG) franchise. Romero and Sawyer both left Midway before the completion of this title. The two characters created by Romero and Sawyer, Lancer and Tragedian, were removed from the final game.

== Reception ==
Reception

Aggregate scores
Aggregator	Score
GameRankings	PS2: 61.56% Xbox: 64.88%
Metacritic	PS2: 59 out of 100; Xbox: 61 out of 100

Review scores
Publication	Score
Electronic Gaming Monthly	6.33 out of 10
Eurogamer	PS2: 5 out of 10
Game Informer	6.25 out of 10
GamePro	PS2: 3.5 out of 5
GameRevolution	D+
GameSpot	5.2 out of 10
GameSpy	3.5 out of 5
GameTrailers	6.7 out of 10
GameZone	Xbox: 7 out of 10
IGN	7 out of 10
Official U.S. PlayStation Magazine	3 out of 5
Official Xbox Magazine (US)	7 out of 10
The A.V. Club	C

Gauntlet: Seven Sorrows was met with mixed reviews.
