= Gunman Taco Truck =

2017 video game

- Publisher: Romero Games
- Engine: Solar2D
- Platforms: Android, iOS, Windows, macOS
- Release: January 28, 2017
- Genre: Roguelike

Gunman Taco Truck is a 2017 post-apocalyptic roguelike indie game created by Romero Games. The player assumes the role of a taco truck driver and salesman, escaping to Winnipeg, Canada, after an accidental nuclear strike, where they will be able to safely sell their tacos.

== Gameplay ==
A player gibs a human enemy. Road signs inform the player of the distance to their destination and can be destroyed for scrap metal.

In Gunman Taco Truck, the player travels through various cities in the United States to get to their end destination of Winnipeg. The majority of the game is spent on the road, where the player can shoot enemies to acquire meat, money, or scrap metal. After completing a road section, they will go to a petrol station, where they can prepare and sell their tacos for money, and purchase fuel, ingredients for tacos, and repairs, armour, and better weapons for their truck. As the player travels through the game, they will find more enemies, whose meat can be used to make new taco recipes. Additionally, while at the petrol station, players may be given tasks for bonus money or scrap metal, such as delivering a package to a specific town.

== Plot ==
In 2020, a scientist accidentally launches seven nuclear bombs across the United States, which cause the people and animals to mutate and grow feral. The player character, "the last Mexican in the U.S.", goes on a journey to Winnipeg, where there are no taco trucks, and they can open their business free of competition.

== Development ==
Donovan Brathwaite-Romero created the concept in 2014. The game was developed over the next 3 years by Donovan and his parents, John Romero and Brenda Romero. Donovan had no prior experience creating a video game, and had to be taught how to code from the ground up by John. In 2017, Donovan was 12 years old.

The game was put through Steam Greenlight on January 13 2017, and was accepted on January 28 2017, where it was released for Windows and Mac. On February 15, it was released for iOS devices.

== Reception ==
Writing for TechRaptor, Travis Williams said "Gunman Taco Truck is a competent action roguelike with some strategy and planning elements thrown in for good measure. Instead of a simple distraction, there is a robust game here that is going to provide quite a challenge, and you'll see a significant amount of gameplay before you reach the end, and it surprised me with just how much game hides just behind the vibrant, silly surface."

The mobile version was given the 2017 Best Game Audio Award by the Irish Game Makers Association, and upon release, it entered the featured section of the App Store in many countries, including the United States, United Kingdom, and Canada.

An April 2020 update for Counter-Strike: Global Offensive includes a music kit from Gunman Taco Truck.
