= Blackroom (video game) =

Canceled first-person shooter

- Developer: Night Work Games
- Director: John Romero
- Designer: John Romero
- Programmer: John Romero
- Artist: Adrian Carmack
- Composer: George Lynch
- Engine: Unreal Engine 4
- Platforms: Windows, Mac OS X
- Release: Cancelled
- Genre: First-person shooter
- Modes: Single-player, multiplayer

Blackroom is a cancelled first-person shooter game from the independent studio Night Work Games, (Note: Subsidiary of Romero Games) created by former id Software developers John Romero and Adrian Carmack. It was planned to be crowdfunded on the Kickstarter platform, but the crowdfunding campaign was cancelled in April 2016. The game was set to launch during the winter quarter of 2018. In 2023, it was confirmed to be cancelled.

== Gameplay ==
The game was set to be a first-person shooter in the same vein as classic shooters that Romero and Carmack first formulated in their early game development years. It was described as "a return to fast, violent and masterful play on the PC." The game was also to feature various multiplayer modes along with its single player campaign, including co-operative play, deathmatch, and more. The controls were described as "fast, skillful movement with rocket jumping, strafe jumping and circle strafing," similar to the controls featured in a previous id Software title, Quake.

== Plot ==
The game was set to take place in an alternate world. HOXAR, a company that specializes in virtual and alternate reality technology, has created the HoloSims, a device that simulates another world to its user. However, something has gone awry with the system, and its users are beginning to see their simulations being warped and changed with terrifying results. The player plays as Dr. Santiago Sonora, a Chief hNode Engineer at HOXAR. After an encounter with the HoloSims device, Sonora begins to have a difficult time separating simulation from reality. Armed with the HOXAR device Boxel and their wits, it is up to Sonora to defeat the system.

== Development ==
Romero's first intention to create a new first-person shooter goes back to 2012, when he mentioned the idea on Twitter. Going forward, during 2014, Romero again certified he was creating a new FPS, and said "I haven't made a shooter since 2000 Daikatana. So I'm basically starting to work on another one". In January 2016, few months before Kickstarter campaign, John Romero said about the game "I don't want to talk about it, because it's a really cool idea, an original idea. I've never seen anything like that before".

Romero announced the game's title as Blackroom, on April 25, 2016, and started a Kickstarter crowdfunding campaign with an aim of $700,000 to be reached in 32 days. The project features John Romero as lead designer and programmer, Adrian Carmack as artist and Dokken's George Lynch as composer; about Blackroom, Romero said "We're developing exactly the type of game we think a lot of shooter fans want. It's the type of shooter we're known for, and the type of game we love to play ourselves. It's a skillful shooter, from movement to weapon and map mastery".

On April 29, 2016, John Romero cancelled Blackroom's Kickstarter campaign, which stopped at over $131,000, pausing it to develop a Blackroom demo and planning to show that and reopen the campaign in the future.

On November 23, 2019, it was reported that Romero was still working on Blackroom. As of September 2020, there had been no new public release. In Romero's 2023 autobiography, “Doom Guy: Life in First Person”, he confirmed that while a demo existed and was shown to publishers, the game was cancelled.
