= John Romero =

American video game designer (born 1967)

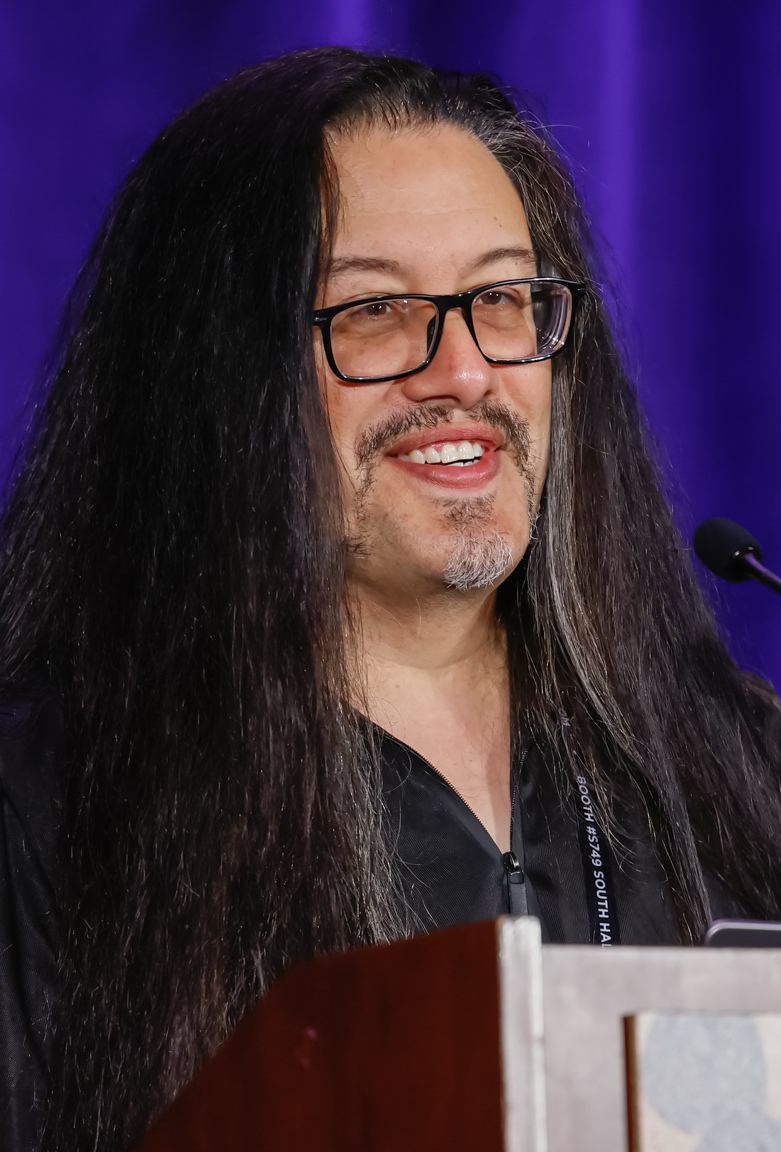
- Romero at the Game Developers Conference in 2022
- Born: Alfonso John Romero; October 28, 1967 (age 59); Colorado Springs, Colorado, U.S.
- Occupations: Video game designer, programmer
- Known for: id Software, Ion Storm, Romero Games
- Notable work: Commander Keen series; Wolfenstein 3D; Doom series; Quake; Daikatana
- Spouses: Kelly Mitchell (m. 1987; div. 1989) Elizabeth Ann McCall (m. 1990; div. 1998) Raluca Alexandra Pleșca (m. 2004; div. 2011) Brenda Brathwaite (m. 2012)
- Partner: Stevie Case (1998–2003)
- Children: 3
- Romero's voice Romero on joining id Software; Recorded February 17, 2023
- Website: romero.com

Alfonso John Romero (born October 28, 1967) is an American video game developer. He co-founded id Software and designed their early games, including Wolfenstein 3D (1992), Doom (1993), Doom II (1994), Hexen (1995) and Quake (1996). His designs and development tools, along with programming techniques developed by the id programmer John Carmack, popularized the first-person shooter (FPS) genre. Romero is also credited with coining the multiplayer term "deathmatch".

Following disputes with Carmack, Romero decided to leave id in 1996. He co-founded a new studio, Ion Storm, and directed the FPS Daikatana (2000), which was a critical and commercial failure. Romero departed Ion Storm in 2001. In July 2001, he and another former id employee, Tom Hall, founded Monkeystone Games to develop games for mobile devices.

In 2003, Romero joined Midway Games as the project lead on Gauntlet: Seven Sorrows (2005), and left shortly before its release. He founded another company, Gazillion Entertainment, in 2005. In 2016, Romero and another former id employee, Adrian Carmack, announced a new FPS, Blackroom, but it was cancelled after failing to find a publisher.

== Early life ==
Alfonso John Romero was born on October 28, 1967, six weeks premature, in Colorado Springs, Colorado. He has said that he has Mexican, Yaqui, and Cherokee grandparents. His mother, Ginny, met Alfonso Antonio Romero when they were teenagers in Tucson, Arizona. Alfonso, a first-generation Mexican American, was a maintenance man at an air force base, spending his days fixing air conditioners and heating systems. After Alfonso and Ginny married, they headed in a 1948 Chrysler with three hundred dollars to Colorado, hoping their interracial relationship would thrive in more tolerant surroundings.

Among Romero's early influences, the arcade video game Space Invaders (1978), with its "shoot the alien" gameplay, introduced him to video games. Namco's maze chase arcade game Pac-Man (1980) had the biggest influence on his career, as it was the first game that got him "thinking about game design." Nasir Gebelli (Sirius Software, Squaresoft) was his favorite programmer and a major inspiration, with Gebelli's fast 3D programming work for Apple II games, such as the shooters Horizon V (1981) and Zenith (1982), influencing Romero's later work at id Software. Other influences include programmer Bill Budge, Shigeru Miyamoto's Super Mario games, and the fighting games Street Fighter II, Fatal Fury, Art of Fighting and Virtua Fighter.

== Career ==
=== Early career ===
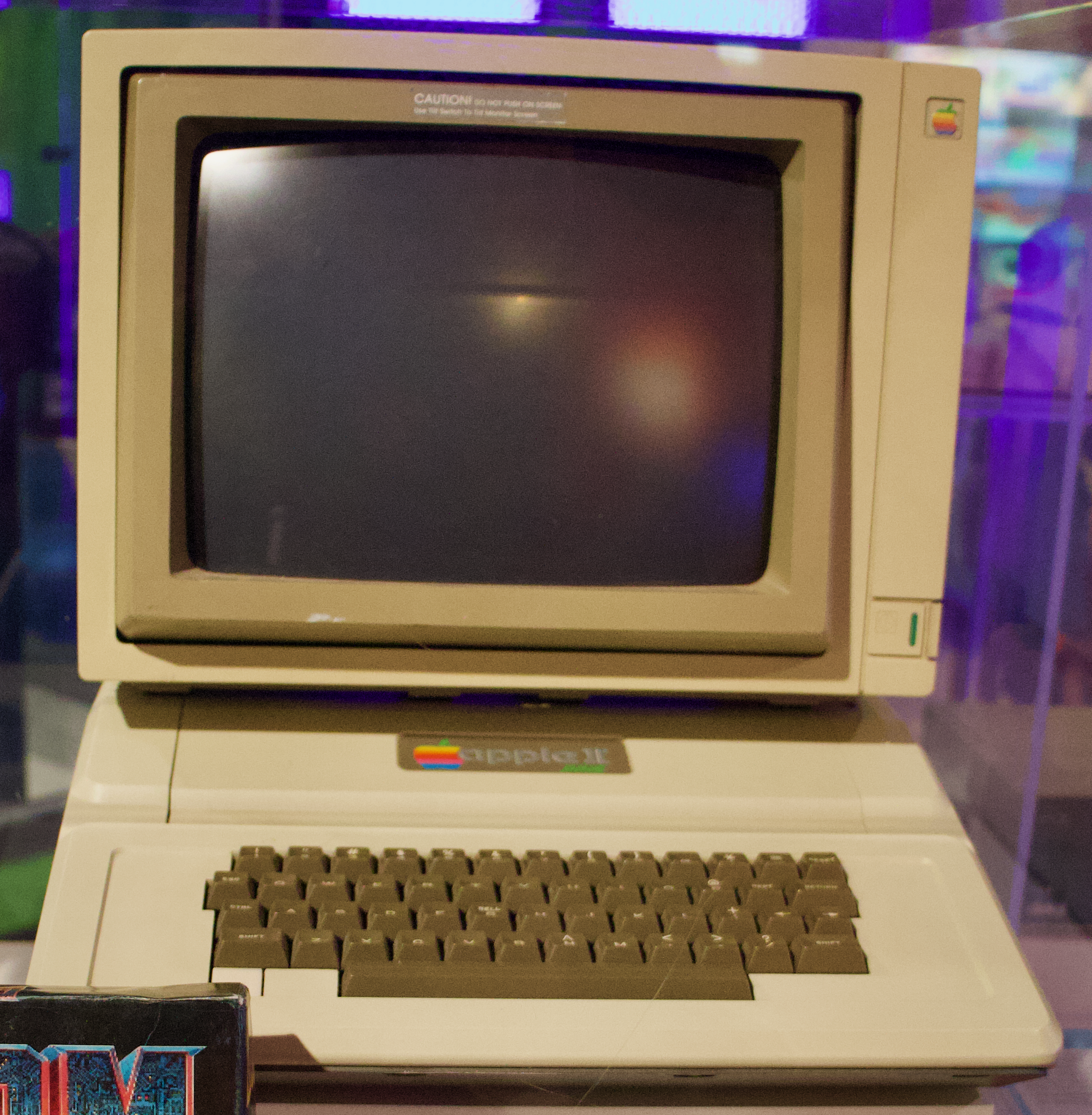
The Apple II owned by John Romero on display at The Strong National Museum of Play

John Romero started programming games on an Apple II he got in 1980. The first game he wrote was an unpublished clone of the arcade game Crazy Climber. His first published game, Scout Search, appeared as a type-in program in the June 1984 issue of Apple II magazine inCider. At least 12 of his games published for print and disk magazines were developed under the name Capitol Ideas Software. He entered a programming contest in A+ magazine during its first year of publishing with his game Cavern Crusader. The first game Romero created that was eventually published was Jumpster in UpTime. Jumpster was created in 1983 and published in 1987, making Jumpster his earliest created, then published, game.

Romero's first industry job was at Origin Systems in 1987 after programming games for eight years. He worked on the Apple II to Commodore 64 port of 2400 A.D., which was eventually scrapped due to slow sales of the Apple II version. Romero then moved onto Space Rogue, a game by Paul Neurath. During this time, Romero was asked if he would be interested in joining Paul's soon-to-start company Blue Sky Productions, eventually renamed Looking Glass Technologies. Instead, Romero left Origin Systems to co-found a game company named Inside Out Software, where he ported Might & Magic II from the Apple II to the Commodore 64. He had almost finished the Commodore 64 to Apple II port of Tower Toppler, but Epyx unexpectedly cancelled all its ports industrywide due to their tremendous investment in the first round of games for the upcoming Atari Lynx. During this short time, Romero did the artwork for the Apple IIGS version of Dark Castle, a port from the Macintosh. During this time, John and his friend Lane Roathe co-founded a company named Ideas from the Deep and wrote versions of a game called Zappa Roidz for the Apple II, PC and Apple IIGS. Their last collaboration was an Apple II disk operating system (InfoDOS) for Infocom's games Zork Zero, Arthur, Shogun and Journey.

=== 1990s: id Software and first-person shooters ===
Romero moved to Shreveport, Louisiana, in March 1989 and joined Softdisk as a programmer in its Special Projects division. After several months of helping the PC monthly disk magazine Big Blue Disk, he officially moved into the department until he started a PC games division in July 1990 named Gamer's Edge (originally titled PCRcade). Romero hired John Carmack into the department from his freelancing in Kansas City, moved Adrian Carmack (no relation) into the division from Softdisk's art department, and persuaded Tom Hall to come in at night and help with game design. Romero and the others left Softdisk in February 1991 to form id Software.

There it was, the familiar milieu of Super Mario Brothers 3: pale blue sky, the puffy white clouds, the bushy green shrubs, the animated tiles with little question marks rolling over their sides and, strangely, his character Dangerous Dave standing ready on the bottom of the screen. Romero tapped his arrow key, moved Dave along the floor, and watched him scroll smoothly across the screen. That’s when he lost it.

— David Kushner, describing Romero's experience of observing the game Dangerous Dave by John Carmack and Tom Hall that introduced an innovative technique for side-scrolling on PC

Romero worked at id Software from its inception in 1991 until 1996. He was involved in the creation of several milestone games, including Commander Keen, Wolfenstein 3D, Doom, Doom II: Hell on Earth and Quake. He served as executive producer (and game designer) on Heretic and Hexen. He designed most of the first episode of Doom, a quarter of the levels in Quake, and half the levels in Commander Keen and Wolfenstein 3D: Spear of Destiny. He wrote many of the tools used at id Software to create their games, including DoomEd (level editor), QuakeEd (level editor), DM (for deathmatch launching), DWANGO client (to connect the game to DWANGO's servers), TED5 (level editor for the Commander Keen series, Wolfenstein 3D: Spear of Destiny), IGRAB (for grabbing assets and putting them in WAD files), the installers for all the games up to and including Quake, the SETUP program used to configure the games, and several others. In his keynote speech at WeAreDevelopers Conference 2017, Romero named this period Turbo Mode, in which he emphasizes having created 28 games, in 5.5 years with a team consisting of fewer than 10 developers. Romero is also credited with coining the multiplayer term "deathmatch".

In level 30 of Doom II, "Icon of Sin", the boss is supposed to be a giant demon head with a fragment missing from its forehead. When first viewing the demon, a distorted and demonic message is played, which is actually John Romero saying "To win the game, you must kill me, John Romero!", reversed and distorted to sound like a demonic chant. One can use the "noclip" cheat to enter the boss and see Romero's severed head which is skewered on a post. The player defeats the boss (without the noclip cheat) by shooting rockets into its exposed brain after activating a lift and riding it. Romero's head functions as its hit detection point; when he "dies", the boss is killed and the game is finished. In the 2013 IGN Doom playthrough to celebrate Doom's 20th anniversary, Romero shared the backstory behind the inclusion of his head as the final boss and the reversed sound effect – they were both a result of in-joke pranking between development team members.

During the production of Quake, Romero clashed with John Carmack over the future direction of id. Romero wanted the game to follow his demanding vision without compromise, but Carmack insisted that the project had to make steady progress toward completion and accused Romero of not working as much as the other developers. Although Romero relented on his vision and joined a months-long crunch effort to finish the game, this did not resolve the tensions within the company, and Romero was forced to resign. In a 1997 interview, Romero said, "Leaving after finishing Quake was the right choice — leaving after finishing a hit game. I keep on good terms with the id guys and it was pretty easy because we've been friends for years." In 2022, during a conversation with podcaster Lex Fridman, Carmack stated that, in hindsight, he regrets the way he dealt with the firing of Romero, citing immaturity and lack of understanding of corporate structure as the primary causal factors. Additionally, Carmack clarified that both he and Romero were currently on good terms.

=== 1996–2000: Ion Storm and Daikatana ===
Romero co-founded Ion Storm in Dallas, Texas with another id co-founder, Tom Hall, where he designed and produced the first-person shooter Daikatana. It was announced in 1997 with a release date for the Christmas shopping season of that year. However, this release date slipped repeatedly in the coming months, and the game began to accrue negative press. In 2010, Gamesauce featured Romero on its cover and contained an in-depth interview with Romero written by Brenda Brathwaite. In the interview, Romero publicly apologized for the infamous Daikatana advertisement. In particular, a 1997 advertisement boasting "John Romero's About To Make You His Bitch....Suck it down" caused controversy in the press and public.

The massive pre-hype for the game and the subsequent delays (it was not released until April 2000) were compounded by the poor reviews the game received when it was finally complete. Daikatana was panned and appeared on numerous "top 10 worst games" listings. During this time, Romero was rumored to have been killed and a photograph of his corpse with a bullet wound was also spread through the Internet. The picture was taken for the magazine Texas Monthly. In 2001, Romero and Hall departed after the release of Hall's Anachronox game and the subsequent closing of the Dallas Ion office.

=== 2000s ===
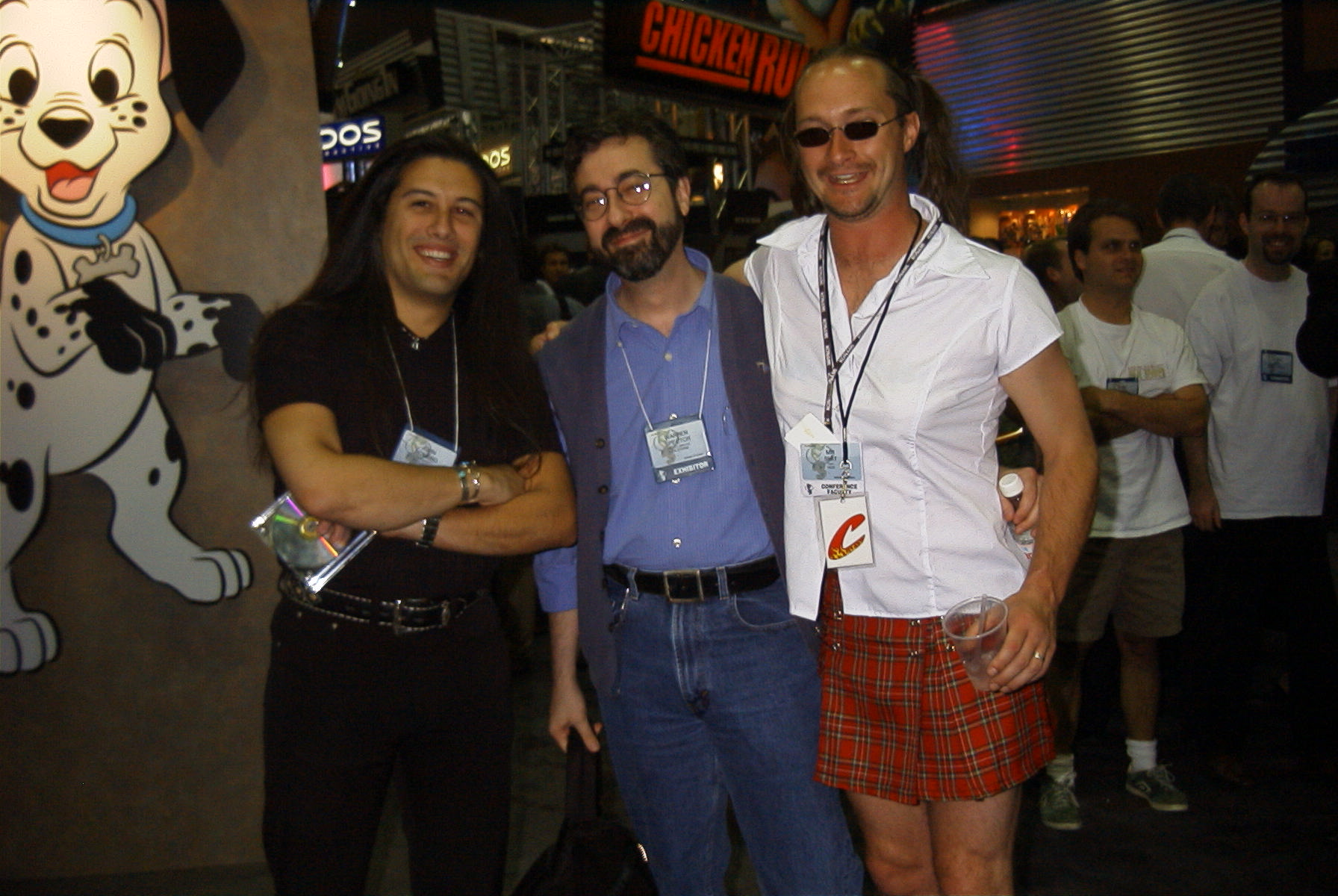
Romero, Warren Spector and Mike Wilson in attendance at E3 2000

In July 2001, Romero and Hall founded Monkeystone Games to develop and publish games for mobile devices. Monkeystone released approximately 15 games during the three-and-a-half-year lifespan of the company. Some highlights of their developments included Hyperspace Delivery Boy! (Pocket PC, Windows, Linux), Congo Cube (Pocket PC, PC, BREW, Java ME), and a version of Red Faction for the Nokia N-Gage. He and his girlfriend, Stevie Case, broke up in 2003, and she left the company in May while Red Faction development continued until October. John then left Monkeystone Games' day-to-day operations to Lucas Davis while Romero and Hall left for Midway in San Diego.

In mid-October 2003, Romero joined Midway Games as project lead on Gauntlet: Seven Sorrows. While he continued to maintain his working relationship with Monkeystone, Lucas Davis took over running the office. The Monkeystone team moved to Austin, Texas to work on Midway's Area 51 title until its release. Monkeystone Games closed down in January 2005. Romero moved from project lead to creative director of internal studio during this time. At the end of June 2005, Romero left Midway Games mere months before the completion of Gauntlet: Seven Sorrows.

On August 31, 2005, Romero confirmed that he was working on a yet-to-be-announced MMOG at his newly opened development studio, Slipgate Ironworks. It was reported that the name was temporary. "For the record," Romero wrote, "I'm co-founder of a new game company in the Bay Area and am much better off in many ways than I was at Midway". He said that he would not reveal anything about the company or the game until 2007. On March 17, 2009, it was announced that Slipgate Ironworks was part of Gazillion Entertainment. Along with venture capitalist Rob Hutter and investor Bhavin Shah, Romero was a co-founder of Gazillion. On July 22, 2006, John Romero and former co-worker Tom Hall guest hosted episode 53 of the podcast The Widget. Romero departed Gazillion Entertainment in November 2010 to form a social game company called Loot Drop alongside Brenda Brathwaite. Hall joined the company on January 1, 2011.

Romero was the chairman of the board for the Cyberathlete Professional League (CPL) for ten years. On December 20, 2006, John Romero announced a new FPS project for the CPL titled Severity for both consoles and PC. It was announced that Tom Mustaine (ex-Studio Director at Ritual Entertainment) would act as Director of Game Development at CPL's new studio. It was stated that Severity would be a multiplayer first person shooter, and that the game would be built on technology licensed from id Software. In October 2009, Angel Munoz, founder of the CPL stated that Severity was no longer being produced because they were not able "to convince game publishers of its value".

=== 2010–present ===
Romero guest-edited the March 2010 issue of the British magazine Retro Gamer. In August 2014, Romero said he planned to make a new FPS. In April 2016, he announced a partnership with the former id artist Adrian Carmack to create the FPS Blackroom, describing their vision as a visceral, varied and violent shooter that harkens back to classic FPS play with a mixture of exploration, speed, and intense combat. They hoped to raise $700,000 (~$939,060 in 2025) via Kickstarter to see the project to completion and anticipated a launch in late 2018. The Kickstarter campaign was cancelled four days after its launch. In 2023, Romero confirmed in his autobiography, Doom Guy: Life in First Person, that while a demo had existed and was shown to publishers, no publishers expressed interest in funding the game after the Kickstarter cancellation, and the game was fully cancelled after that behind-closed-doors demo.

On 2017, Romero won the Bizkaia Award at the Fun & Serious Game Festival, which takes place in the Spanish city of Bilbao. Romero and his wife Brenda Romero established Romero Games on August 11, 2015. They published Gunman Taco Truck in 2017, SIGIL in 2019, and Empire of Sin in 2020. In March 2022, in response to the 2022 Russian invasion of Ukraine, Romero created a new level of Doom II which was subsequently listed for sale through his personal website. Romero stated that all proceeds would be donated to the Ukrainian Red Cross and the UN Central Emergency Response Fund.

== Personal life ==
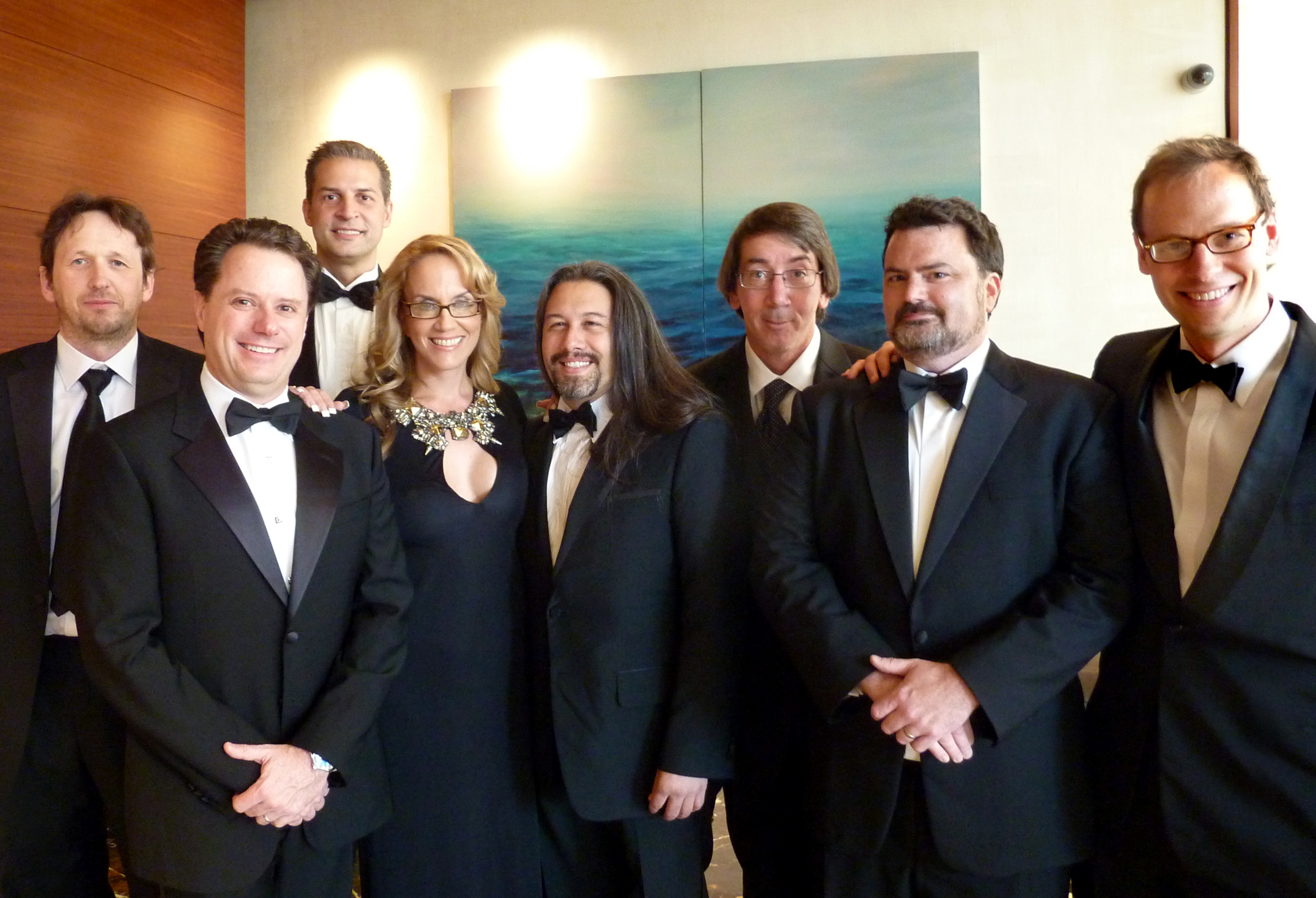
Romero (center) and other game developers at a BAFTA event in Los Angeles in 2011. From left: Rod Humble, Louis Castle, David Perry, Brenda Romero, John Romero, Will Wright, Tim Schafer, Chris Hecker.

In January 2004, Romero married Raluca Alexandra Pleșca, originally from Bucharest, Romania. They divorced in 2011. Romero and game developer Brenda Brathwaite became engaged on March 24, 2012, and married on October 27, 2012. Together, they worked on Ravenwood Fair, with Romero as Lead Designer and Brathwaite as Creative Director and Game Designer. They also founded social game development company Loot Drop in November 2010, and worked on Cloudforest Expedition and Ghost Recon Commander together. Romero has three children from two previous marriages: Michael, born in 1988, Steven, born in 1989, and Lillia Antoinette, born in 1998.

Romero's long hair has been a source of both admiration and derision for his fans. John guest-answered Planet Quake's "Dear Mynx" column, in which a female fan asked for hair care tips. Romero cut his hair short in 2002 and donated it to Locks of Love.

Discussion boards such as Doomworld and BeyondUnreal had threads discussing his new look at the time, although he began to grow it back to its original length in 2003. On January 11, 2022, Romero gave a statement via Twitter on the subject of his hair, to coincide with the 120th anniversary of William Arthur Jones' "Indian haircut order" of 1902. In the statement, Romero said: "I wear my hair long as a proud Yaqui and Cherokee man, and will continue to do so until the day I die."

In 2000, during the development of Daikatana, Romero listed Ultima V: Warriors of Destiny, Super Mario Bros. 3, Age of Empires, Duke Nukem 3D and Chrono Trigger as his favorite games of all time, with Chrono Trigger topping the list. In 2017, Romero listed World of Warcraft and Minecraft as his favorite games of all time.

Romero's favorite programming language as of 2017 is Lua. Romero says he has hyperthymesia. Romero is an atheist. He also claimed that everyone involved at working on the original Doom was an atheist (although game designer Sandy Petersen is a Mormon). On December 19, 2023, Romero acquired Irish citizenship, after living there for about eight years.

Romero was referenced in the 2020 video game Doom Eternal as King Ormero.

== Recognition ==
Date	Award	Description
2023	Lifetime Achievement Award	Awarded at GDC 2023
2017	Bizkaia Award	Awarded at the Fun & Serious Game Festival
2017	Development Legend	Awarded at Develop:Brighton
2016	Cacoward	Awarded at Doomworld.com for the new DOOM 1 level E1M8b
2012	Tech Hall of Fame	Included in list of technology creators.
2012	Apple II Forever Award	Awarded at KansasFest to members of the Apple II community who had made significant contributions to the Apple II.
2011	Most Influential Person in Facebook and Social Games	#1 in Games.com's 2011 list.
1999	MIT Technology Review TR100	Innovators Under 35.
1998	Time Magazine's Cyber Elite 50	#36, The top 50 tech elite of the year.
1998	Top 20 Texans of the Year	Texas Monthly's yearly list of the Top 20 Texans
1997	Time Magazine's Cyber Elite 50	#40, The top 50 tech elite of the year.
1996	The Most Influential People in Computer Gaming of All Time	#7, GameSpot's "The Most Influential People in Computer Gaming of All Time" list.

== Games ==
Name	Year	Publisher	Role(s)
Dodge 'Em	1982	Capitol Ideas Software	Programmer, Designer, Art, Sound
Scout Search	1984	inCider Magazine	Programmer, Designer, Sound
Cavern Crusader	1984	A+ Magazine	Programmer, Designer, Sound, Art
Bongo's Bash	1985	A+ Magazine	Programmer, Designer, Sound
Zippy Zombi	1987	Uptime Disk Monthly	Programmer, Designer, Sound
Wacky Wizard	1987	Uptime Disk Monthly	Programmer, Designer, Sound
Subnodule	1987	Keypunch Software, Inc.	Programmer, Designer, Sound
Pyramids of Egypt	1987	Uptime Disk Monthly	Programmer, Designer, Sound
Neptune's Nasties	1987	Uptime Disk Monthly	Programmer, Designer, Sound
Major Mayhem	1987	Nibble Magazine	Programmer, Designer, Sound
Lethal Labyrinth	1987	Uptime Disk Monthly	Programmer, Designer, Sound
Krazy Kobra	1987	Uptime Disk Monthly	Programmer, Designer, Sound
Jumpster	1987	Uptime Disk Monthly	Programmer, Designer, Sound
Evil Eye	1987	Uptime Disk Monthly	Programmer, Designer, Sound
James Clavell's Shōgun	1988	Infocom	Programmer
Dangerous Dave in the Deserted Pirate's Hideout	1988	Uptime Disk Monthly	Programmer, Designer, Sound, Art
City Centurian	1988	Nibble Magazine	Programmer, Designer, Sound, Art
Zork Zero: The Revenge of Megaboz	1989	Infocom	Programmer
Zappa Roidz	1989	Softdisk Publishing	Programmer, Designer
Twilight Treasures	1989	Softdisk Publishing	Associate Editor
Space Rogue	1989	Origin Systems	Programmer
Might and Magic II: Gates to Another World	1989	New World Computing	Lead programmer
Magic Boxes	1989	Softdisk Publishing	Lead programmer
Journey: The Quest Begins	1989	Infocom	Programmer
How to Weigh an Elephant	1989	Softdisk Publishing	Programmer
Big Blue Disk #32	1989	Softdisk Publishing	Programmer
Big Blue Disk #35	1989	Softdisk Publishing	Contributor
Arthur: The Quest for Excalibur	1989	Infocom	Programmer
Sub Stalker	1990	Softdisk Publishing	Programmer, Designer, Sound, Art
Pixel Puzzler	1990	Softdisk Publishing	Pixel Puzzle Maker
Dinosorcerer	1990	Softdisk Publishing	Programmer
Dark Designs II: Closing the Gate	1990	Softdisk Publishing	Level Designer
Commander Keen 1: Marooned on Mars	1990	Apogee Software	Programmer, Level Designer
Commander Keen 2: The Earth Explodes	1990	Apogee Software	Programmer, Level Designer
Commander Keen 3: Keen Must Die!	1990	Apogee Software	Programmer, Level Designer
Catacomb	1990	Softdisk Publishing	Programmer
Big Blue Disk #40	1990	Softdisk Publishing	Associate Editor
Big Blue Disk #41	1990	Softdisk Publishing	Associate Editor
Big Blue Disk #44	1990	Softdisk Publishing	Associate Editor
Alfredo's Stupendous Surprise	1990	Softdisk	Programmer
Xenopods	1991	Softdisk Publishing	Engine Tools
Slordax: The Unknown Enemy	1991	Softdisk	Engine Tools
Rescue Rover	1991	Softdisk	Programmer
Rescue Rover 2	1991	Expert Software, Froggman, Softdisk	Programmer
Shadow Knights	1991	Softdisk Publishing	Programmer, Level Designer
Paragon	1991	Softdisk	Engine Tools
Paganitzu	1991	Apogee Software	Special Thanks
Hovertank One	1991	Softdisk	Programmers
Dangerous Dave in the Haunted Mansion	1991	Softdisk	Programmer
Commander Keen: Keen Dreams	1991	Softdisk	Programmer
Commander Keen 4: Secret of the Oracle	1991	Apogee Software	Programmer, Level Designer
Commander Keen 5: The Armageddon Machine	1991	Apogee Software	Programmer, Level Designer
Commander Keen 6: Aliens Ate My Baby Sitter!	1991	FormGen	Programmer, Level Designer
The Catacomb (Catacomb II)	1991	Softdisk	Programmer
Catacomb 3-D	1991	Softdisk	Programming
Wolfenstein 3D	1992	Apogee Software	Programmer, Designer, Sound
Spear of Destiny	1992	FormGen	Level Designer
Cyberchess	1992	Softdisk	Engine Tools
Catacomb Abyss	1992	Softdisk	Engine Tools
Curse of the Catacombs	1993	Froggman	Engine Tools
Terror of the Catacombs	1993	Froggman	Engine Tools
Street Ball	1993	Froggman	Engine Tools
Shadowcaster	1993	Origin Systems	Engine Tools
ScubaVenture: The Search for Pirate's Treasure	1993	Softdisk	Engine Tools
Dangerous Dave's Risky Rescue	1993	Softdisk	Engine Tools
Bio Menace	1993	Apogee Software	Engine Tools
Blake Stone: Aliens of Gold	1993	Apogee Software	Programmer
Doom	1993	id Software	Programmer, Designer
Corridor 7: Alien Invasion	1994	Capstone Software	Engine Tools
Super 3D Noah's Ark	1994	Wisdom Tree	Programmer
Doom II: Hell on Earth	1994	GT Interactive	Programmer, Designer
Blake Stone: Planet Strike	1994	FormGen	Programmer
Heretic	1994	id Software	Executive Producer
The Ultimate Doom	1995	GT Interactive	Programmer, Designer
Hexen: Beyond Heretic	1995	id Software	Executive Producer
Heretic: Shadow of the Serpent Riders	1996	id Software	Executive Producer
Final Doom	1996	id Software; Atari, Inc.	Programmer, Designer
Quake	1996	id Software	Programmer, Designer
Chex Quest	1996	Digital Café	Engine Programmer
Doom 64	1997	Midway Games	Engine Tools, Designer
Dominion: Storm Over Gift 3	1998	Eidos Interactive	Music Director
Daikatana	2000	Eidos Interactive	Designer
Red Faction (mobile version)	2001	THQ Wireless	Programmer
Anachronox	2001	Eidos Interactive	Level Designer
Hyperspace Delivery Boy!	2002	Monkeystone Games	Lead Programmer
Jewels and Jim	2003	THQ Wireless	Level Designer
Dig It!	2003	THQ Wireless	Level Designer
Congo Cube	2003	THQ Wireless, RealArcade	Programmer
Cartoon Network: Block Party	2004	Majesco	Programmer
Gauntlet: Seven Sorrows	2005	Midway Games	Special Thanks
Area 51	2005	Midway Austin	Additional Designer
Ravenwood Fair	2010	Lolapps	Programmer, Designer, Sound
Marvel Super Hero Squad Online	2011	Gazillion Entertainment Inc.	Special Thanks
Tom Clancy's Ghost Recon: Commander	2012	Ubisoft, Inc.	Designer
Pettington Park	2012	Zynga Game Network, Inc.	CEO, Additional Design
Dodger Down	2013	Howljerk Games	Testing and Feedback
Play Gig-it	2013	Gig-it Corp	Special Thanks
Techno Dash	2014	Hammerwing Studios, Inc.	Special Thanks
Dangerous Dave in the Deserted Pirate's Hideout	2015	John Romero	Programmer, Designer, Sound, Art
Grom Skate	2015	Grom Social Inc.	Designer, Sound
Warpcop III	2017	indie published	Designer, Sound
July 4, 1976	2017	Playbarf	Programmer, Sound, Designer, Writer
Gunman Taco Truck	2017	Romero Games Ltd.	Programmer, Sound, Designer, Writer
SIGIL	2019	Romero Games Ltd.	Programmer, Designer
Empire of Sin	2020	Romero Games Ltd.	Programmer
SIGIL II	2023	Romero Games Ltd.	Programmer, Designer
