= Playboy: The Mansion =

2005 video game

- North American cover art
- Developer: Cyberlore Studios
- Publisher: Arush Entertainment; Groove Games: PAL: Ubisoft
- Director: Seth Spaulding
- Producer: Eric Marcoullier
- Designer: Brenda Brathwaite
- Programmer: William McFadden
- Artist: Seth Spaulding
- Engine: Gamebryo
- Platforms: Microsoft Windows, PlayStation 2, Xbox
- Release: NA: January 25, 2005; PAL: March 4, 2005
- Genres: Erotic, business simulation game
- Mode: Single player

Playboy: The Mansion is a 2005 simulation video game for the PlayStation 2, Microsoft Windows and Xbox consoles, developed by Cyberlore Studios, published by Groove Games and Arush Entertainment and licensed by Playboy Enterprises.

== Gameplay ==
Playboy: The Mansion puts players in the role of Hugh Hefner, the founder of Playboy Magazine and Playboy Enterprises, referred to in the game as 'Hef'. The aim of the game is to build the famed Playboy Empire from scratch, starting from a humble magazine to celebrity endorsements to home entertainment to Internet websites to merchandise.

The player can mold the famed Playboy Mansion to their own needs and wants, and has the option of experiencing the infamous Playboy Playmate parties in locations such as the Grotto and the Clubhouse. Hef, as well as all other characters in the game, can build three types of relationships with other characters: casual, business, and romantic. Each month, the player has to print an issue of the magazine. To do that the player needs a cover shoot, a centerfold, an essay from a celebrity, interview with a celebrity, a pictorial about a subject and an article about a subject. The player must hire photographers and writers to create each issue. All the characters have interests, such as sports and music, and writers on those topics will produce higher-quality articles. In the game, the player is the photographer during photo shoots. The game contains many sexual references, including sexual relationships.

There are twelve missions in total. Some of the goals include making and/or fixing relationships with people, publishing certain magazine content, and throwing parties. Players can also choose not to achieve goals, as there is no time limit, and do other things such as parties, mansion renovations and playing with the mansion's variety of games; however, magazines must continue to be published as that is the player's income source.

== Music ==
The main song on the video game is "Playboy Mansion" by Prince Charming, from the album Songs For My Therapist. A soundtrack to the game, mixed by American DJ and record producer Felix da Housecat has been released. It features house tracks by many renowned producers like Armand Van Helden, DJ Sneak or Kaskade.

== Expansion pack ==
Playboy: The Mansion - Private Party Expansion Pack is the expansion pack. It adds extra features such as parties like Midsummer Night's Dream, world-famous celebrities and Playmates, new animations, enhanced character editing and party-themed music.

=== Features ===
The expansion adds many new features to the game. When characters engage in sexual activities, they now remove their underwear and their genitals are blurred, much like The Sims characters. Another feature is the ability to throw "theme parties", which consist of Halloween, A Midsummer Night's Dream, Hef's Birthday, Tropical, Playmate of the Year and more.

== Development ==
The game used the Gamebryo engine.

== Reception ==
Reception

Aggregate scores
Aggregator	Score
GameRankings	(Xbox) 62.14% (PC) 60% (PS2) 59.97%
Metacritic	(Xbox) 61/100 (PC) 59/100 (PS2) 59/100

Review scores
Publication	Score
Electronic Gaming Monthly	4.67/10
Eurogamer	5/10
Game Informer	6.5/10
GamePro	2.5/5
GameRevolution	C−
GameSpot	6.3/10
GameSpy	3/5
GameZone	6.8/10 (PS2) 6.6/10
IGN	6.9/10
Official U.S. PlayStation Magazine	2/5
Official Xbox Magazine (US)	7.6/10
PC Gamer (US)	61%
Detroit Free Press	2/4
The Sydney Morning Herald	2.5/5

The game was met with mixed reception. GameRankings and Metacritic gave it a score of 60% and 59 out of 100 for the PC version, 59.97% and 59 out of 100 for the PlayStation 2 version, and 62.14% and 61 out of 100 for the Xbox version.

Eurogamer noted that the game was similar to The Sims series but was unfortunately less entertaining. It was considered "a little too slight a proposition for a full game."

The New York Times gave it a mixed review and stated: "Sex and nudity often work well in movies, but video games laced with sex never rise above mediocrity, and Mansion seems decidedly underbaked." The Sydney Morning Herald gave it two-and-a-half stars out of five and called it "A frisky concept with limited thrills and not enough depth to challenge gamers." Detroit Free Press gave it two stars out of four and stated: "I flipped on the game expecting a world of champagne, roses and frequent wisps of steam. Instead, I got an immediate request that I construct an office on the mansion's upper floor."
