= Dangerous Dave in the Haunted Mansion =

1991 video game

- Developers: Gamer's Edge id Software
- Publisher: Softdisk Publishing
- Artists: Jerry Jones; Adrian Carmack
- Engine: Shadow Knights
- Platforms: DOS, Mobile phones
- Release: DOS: WW: 1991; Mobile phones: WW: 2008
- Genre: Platform

Dangerous Dave in the Haunted Mansion (also known as Dangerous Dave 2 and under the Froggman title, Rooms of Doom) is a 1991 sequel of the computer game Dangerous Dave. It was created by John Romero, John Carmack, Adrian Carmack and Tom Hall. It was developed on the Shadow Knights engine with some extra code for smoother character movement. Also an auto-loading shotgun debuts in the game. Many of the features that debuted in this game were carried over to its sequels, Dangerous Dave's Risky Rescue and Dave Goes Nutz!

== Gameplay ==
Dave's mission is to rescue his brother Delbert, lost in the haunted mansion teeming with creatures. To do this, he needs to complete eight levels, going through the door on each level. A shotgun can be used to fight such monsters as zombies, ghosts, slimes and others. Levels are packed with various traps and shiny diamonds.

== Release ==
In 1993 the game was re-released by the short lived publisher Froggman under the name Rooms of Doom. The game is identical, but the story now involves a character named Jake (Dave) entering a haunted mansion to save his friend Mikey (Delbert). This version was released on both 3½ inch and 5¼ inch floppy disks for DOS computers.

Dangerous Dave in the Haunted Mansion was ported to cell phones in 2008. This version of the game was developed in Java.
