= Dangerous Dave =

1988 video game

- Developer: John Romero
- Publisher: Softdisk
- Platforms: Apple II, MS-DOS, iOS, Windows
- Release: 1988
- Genre: Platform
- Mode: Single-player

Dangerous Dave is a 1988 platform game by John Romero. It was developed for the Apple II and MS-DOS as an example game to accompany his article about his GraBASIC, an Applesoft BASIC add-on, for the UpTime disk magazine.

== Gameplay ==
The Apple II version of the original Dangerous Dave

The object of the game is to collect gold trophies to move on to the next level. Since the original 1988 publishing of Dangerous Dave on UpTime, there have been three sequels and three ports of the original to other platforms.

The idea for Dangerous Dave came to John Romero under the influence of Super Mario. There are similarities between the two games, such as the secret levels, the level design, the monsters, and the jumping. According to Romero, he was "on purpose trying to make a Mario game". The mission is to guide Dave through ten levels, collecting trophies in the hideout of his enemy, Clyde. Romero says that among all Dangerous Dave sequels Dangerous Dave in the Haunted Mansion is "the best Dave ever created".

In 2008, Dangerous Dave in the Haunted Mansion was ported to cell phones.

== Games ==
- Dangerous Dave in the Deserted Pirate's Hideout, 1988, Apple II, 6-color, UpTime (the original)
- Dangerous Dave, 1990, DOS (CGA, EGA, VGA), Softdisk (DOS version of the 1988 original)
- Dangerous Dave in Copyright Infringement, 1990, DOS, EGA, non-published (the demo that launched Commander Keen and id Software)
- Dangerous Dave GS, 1990, Apple IIGS, never completed (IIGS version of the 1988 original)
- Dangerous Dave in the Haunted Mansion, 1991, DOS, EGA, Softdisk
- Dangerous Dave in Trophy Trouble, 1991, Apple II, 16-color, Softdisk (16 color port of the 1988 original)
- Dangerous Dave Returns, 1992, Apple II, 16-color, Softdisk
- Dangerous Dave's Risky Rescue, 1993, DOS, EGA, Softdisk
- Dave Goes Nutz!, 1993, DOS, EGA, Softdisk
- Dangerous Dave Goes Nutz!, 1995, Apple II, 16-color, Softdisk
- Dangerous Dave Pack (compilation), 2012, Windows, Softdisk Publishing
- Dangerous Dave in the Deserted Pirate's Hideout, 2015, iOS, Alfonso Romero

== Post-Romero games ==
=== Dangerous Dave's Risky Rescue ===
Dangerous Dave's Risky Rescue (known informally as Dangerous Dave 3) was published by Softdisk in 1993, and is the first Dangerous Dave game to not be programmed by John Romero. This is because he, John Carmack, Adrian Carmack and Tom Hall had left Softdisk by this point to form id Software. It was followed by a sequel, Dave Goes Nutz!, which shares similar gameplay elements.

Like the previous title, Dangerous Dave is on a mission to save his little brother Delbert, this time from the evil "Dr. Nemesis" (who is also the main antagonist in Softdisk's Catacomb franchise).

=== Dave Goes Nutz! ===
Dave Goes Nutz! (known informally as Dangerous Dave 4) was published by Softdisk in 1993 for. It continues from Dangerous Dave's Risky Rescue, where Dangerous Dave is on a mission to save his little brother Delbert, from the evil "Dr. Nemesis" (who is also the main antagonist in Softdisk's Catacomb franchise). The game takes place within a psychiatric hospital filled with zombies.

== Reception ==
Dangerous Dave's Risky Rescue was reviewed in 1993 in Dragon #200 by Sandy Petersen in the "Eye of the Monitor" column. Petersen gave the game 2 out of 5 stars.
