= Catacomb (video game) =

1990 video game

- Developer: Softdisk
- Publisher: Softdisk
- Director: Tom Hall
- Designers: John Carmack; John Romero
- Programmer: John Carmack
- Artist: Adrian Carmack
- Platforms: Apple II; Apple IIGS; MS-DOS
- Release: 1990
- Genre: Shooter
- Mode: Single-player

Catacomb is a 2D top-down third-person shooter developed and published by Softdisk. It was originally created for the Apple II, and later ported to IBM PC compatibles. It supports EGA and CGA graphics. Catacomb was programmed by John Carmack, who would later work on successful games such as Wolfenstein 3D and Doom. The fast action and the ability to strafe in Catacomb foreshadow Carmack's later work. The enemy movement code in Wolfenstein 3D is based on code from Catacomb.

Catacomb was followed by multiple sequels, which were all initially published by Softdisk. The DOS game The Catacomb and the three Apple II games Sylvan Idyll, Ether Quest and Sand Trap are also top-down third-person shooters. Additionally, the Catacomb series includes four first-person shooters for DOS: Catacomb 3-D, Catacomb Abyss, Catacomb Armageddon and Catacomb Apocalypse.

In March 2013, Catacomb, as well as its sequels The Catacomb and the Catacomb 3-D, were published on GOG.com as part of the Catacombs Pack. The source code to the game was released by Flat Rock Software in June 2014 under GNU GPL-2.0-or-later in a manner similar to those done by id Software and partners.

== Gameplay ==
In the game, the player assumes the role of the magician Petton Everhail, who is contacted by Terexin, High Wizard of the Kieralon. Terexin informs him the Kieralon Empire has fallen. The player must travel to the Kieralon Palace to collect the lost treasures of Terexin. Catacomb consists of fifteen levels in the Apple II version and ten levels in the sampler disk promoting the PC disk magazine Gamer's Edge. To progress to the next level the player must step through a magic teleportation mirror. These mirrors are usually behind a locked door, requiring a key to advance.

There are four different attacks: Fireball, Super Fireball, Bolt (powerful strike in one direction), and Nuke (powerful strike in all four directions). The Fireball and Super Fireball attacks can be cast an infinite number of times. The Bolt and Nuke consume a scroll each time they are cast. The player starts the game with three Bolt scrolls and two Nuke scrolls. Additional scrolls are scattered through the levels. There are five different enemies: Goblin, Skeleton, Ogre, Gargoyle and Dragon.

The player has the ability to strafe, which is a feature that programmer John Carmack would also include in later games such as Wolfenstein 3D and Doom. Another notable element of Catacomb is the often-ironic lines of text written on the walls.

== Development ==
The game Catacomb was initially developed by programmer John Carmack for the Apple II and Apple IIGS personal computers. In 1990 Carmack joined Softdisk, a software company based in Shreveport, Louisiana. There he worked together with game developer John Romero, who initiated a bi-monthly disk magazine called Gamer's Edge. Customers could subscribe to Gamer's Edge to receive one or more PC games from Softdisk at a two-month interval. In July 1990, Softdisk CEO Al Vekovius told Carmack and Romero that in order to attract subscribers, the Gamer's Edge sampler disk should contain two games. Since those two games had to be developed within the challenging time frame of only a single month, the two developers decided to port two of their existing Apple II games to PC. Carmack rewrote his game Catacomb for PC, while Romero ported Dangerous Dave. Both games were finished before the deadline and published on the Gamer's Edge sampler disk.

In the following years, John Carmack and John Romero would continue to work together on successful games such as Wolfenstein 3D and Doom. The enemy movement code in the first game is based on code from Catacomb. According to the book Masters of Doom, Carmack and Romero became aware of each others strengths and weaknesses while working on the ports of Catacomb and Dangerous Dave. This knowledge enabled them to work together effectively.

== Sequels ==
=== The Catacomb ===
The Catacomb
- Publisher: Softdisk
- Platform: DOS
- Release: 1991
- Genre: Third-person shooter

The Catacomb, also known as Catacomb II, is a 2-D top-down third-person shooter for DOS. It was published by Softdisk as a sequel to the game Catacomb. The game contains 30 levels. The graphics and gameplay are identical to its predecessor.

According to the autobiography of John Romero, "Catacomb 2" was developed by id Software and sold to Softdisk in 1991. Softdisk later renamed the game to The Catacomb and published it as part of their Lost game collection of ID Software. In March 2013, The Catacomb was published on GOG.com as part of the Catacombs Pack. The source code of the game was released under the GNU General Public License in June 2014.

=== Catacomb 3-D ===
Catacomb 3-D is a first-person shooter for DOS, developed by Id Software and published by Softdisk in November 1991. The game renders the levels with a 3D perspective and introduced the concept of showing the player's hand in the three-dimensional viewpoint. This makes Catacomb 3-D an early example of the first-person shooter genre.

=== Catacomb Abyss ===
Catacomb Abyss is a first-person shooter for DOS, developed by Softdisk as a sequel to Catacomb 3-D and released in November 1992. Softdisk published a shareware version of Catacomb Abyss, which could be freely distributed and played to encourage gamers to purchase its two sequels, Catacomb Armageddon and Catacomb Apocalypse.

=== Sylvan Idyll ===
Sylvan Idyll
- Publisher: Softdisk
- Platforms: Apple II; Apple IIGS
- Release: 1992
- Genre: Third-person shooter

Sylvan Idyll is a 2-D top-down third-person shooter published by Softdisk in 1992 for the Apple II and Apple IIGS home computers. The Apple II version was developed by Peter Rokitski, while the IIGS port was developed by Nate Trost. The game contains 15 levels and is situated in a large forest.

=== Ether Quest ===
Ether Quest
- Publisher: Softdisk
- Platforms: Apple II; Apple IIGS
- Release: 1993
- Genre: Third-person shooter

Ether Quest is a 2-D top-down third-person shooter published by Softdisk in 1993 for the Apple II and Apple IIGS home computers. The Apple II version was developed by Peter Rokitski. The IIGS port was developed by Nate Trost.

In this game, the protagonist Petton Everhail is transferred to an "ethereal plane" between time and space. Unlike the other 2D Catacomb games, the level progression is non-linear in Ether Quest. From the starting room, the player can go back and forth between several different sections of the game. The website Hardcore Gaming 101 considers this game to have the highest difficulty in the series.

=== Sand Trap ===
Sand Trap
- Publisher: Softdisk
- Platforms: Apple II; Apple IIGS
- Release: 1994
- Genre: Third-person shooter

Sand Trap is a 2-D top-down third-person shooter published by Softdisk in 1994 for the Apple II and Apple IIGS home computers. In the game, the protagonist Petton Everhail has to find the exit of a pyramid. There are two new features compared to the previous games: an armor that offers extra protection and the possibility to freeze time such that enemies are unable to move or attack.
