= Journey (1989 video game) =

Journey: The Quest Begins
- Developer: Infocom
- Publisher: Infocom
- Designer: Marc Blank
- Artist: Donald Langosy
- Engine: Z-machine
- Platforms: Amiga, Apple II, MS-DOS, Mac
- Release: 1989
- Genre: Interactive fiction
- Mode: Single player

Journey: The Quest Begins is an interactive fiction video game designed by Marc Blank, with illustrations by Donald Langosy, and released by Infocom in 1989. Like the majority of Infocom's works, it was released simultaneously for several popular computer platforms, such as the Commodore Amiga, Apple II, and IBM PC compatibles. Journey is unusual among Infocom games in that it could be played entirely via mouse or joystick, with no typing required. It was the thirty-fifth and last game released by Infocom before parent company Activision closed the Cambridge office, effectively reducing Infocom to a "label" to be applied to later games.

Journey was the only game released under the "Infocom Roleplay Chronicles" genre. It contains illustrations similar to those used in James Clavell's Shōgun and Arthur: The Quest for Excalibur. This would be the last game that Infocom would both develop and publish.

== Plot ==
The game package acknowledges the strong influence of Tolkien on the plot of Journey. A land reminiscent of Middle-earth has been ravaged by a mysterious, evil power. Crops, water, and the inhabitants themselves suffer from unexplainable illnesses and blights. A group of villagers ventured forth to seek the help of the reclusive wizard Astrix, but they have not been heard from in months. It is feared that few will survive the additional hardships of the coming winter, and so a second group is being dispatched. The four chosen are Bergon (a young carpenter), Praxix (a wizard), Esher (a healer), and Tag (a merchant). They leave their village behind to cross unknown lands with two goals: to discover the fate of the earlier party, and to plead Astrix for assistance. While Bergon is the leader the group, the story is told by Tag and, for the most part, seen through his eyes.

== Gameplay ==
The game's interface is highly unusual for Infocom. A large window at the top of the screen is divided between a graphic and text describing the current location. The bottom window is subdivided into additional sections: commands that may be performed by the party as a group, such as "Proceed" (continue along the current path), and commands for only one character in the party (the wizard Praxix might be able to "Cast" a spell). The player uses the keyboard, mouse, or joystick to select choices from these menus. This is a stark contrast to the majority of Infocom's other games, in which each command is typed in manually.

At a non-winning end of the game, the player is given the option to read "musings" by the narrator. These typically refer to points in the game where things had gone wrong and give gentle hints on ways to reach a better ending.

== Release ==
The game includes the following supplementary items:

- a red fabric pouch containing a "crystal"
- a map of the land

== Reception ==
G.M. magazine described Journey's storyline as lovely, and a refreshing departure from the graphical tile-based game RPGs that were common at the time. Computer Gaming World gave the game a glowing review, giving particular praise to the game's command interface, but also saying "Journey is full of delightful puzzles, superb prose, and finely honed legends."

Games magazine called Journey "interactive storytelling at its best." The reviewer said that Journey was "an interesting story full of fascinating byways and hidden paths that you are guaranteed to miss the first time through." Games magazine selected Journey as one of the best computer games of 1989.

Amiga Format rated Journey 82% overall, recommending the game to "anyone who likes games that require thought input". The review singled out the game's "simple and easy to use" keyword selection system and the "very logical and intriguing" puzzles.

Game Players said the game was "more like a novel than a text adventure" with the goal being "to find out how the story ends" rather than solving puzzles. The review said Journey had "some of the best interactive fiction writing ever" consisting mostly of "well-written narration". The review also praised the game's "extremely attractive" and "well-executed illustrations." The game was less time-consuming and mentally taxing than previous Infocom titles like Zork and The Hitchhiker's Guide to the Galaxy, trading an emphasis on story for a short playing time. The reviewer felt that "Journey's trade-off is successful", pointing "towards a possible future of the genre" where interactive fiction evolves "into a story-telling medium rather than a gaming medium."

Dragon magazine named Journey the best Macintosh fantasy role-playing game of 1989.
