= Computer Life =

Defunct magazine

Computer Life was a magazine which focused on computers. The New York Times called it "an endless array of permutations that marry the term PC to some older, less-capitalized form of existence" because of its coverage of "the culture of computers." Amidst "hundreds of computing magazines" its focus was Generation X.

== History ==
Ziff Davis began publishing the San Francisco monthly in 1994. Advertising revenues had increased by 1996, but not in proportion to "the increase in overall spending." Part of this was attributed to major portions of some company's ad budgets focused on television.

When it first came out, Family Life was "the largest start-up ever undertaken" by Ziff Davis. This was the era when the magazine's big brother was "No. 1 in total advertising, ahead of Forbes and Business Week." By 1998 it had been renamed; it was subsequently closed by Ziff Davis.
