= Catacomb Abyss =

1992 video game

- Title screen
- Developer: Softdisk
- Publisher: Softdisk
- Designer: Greg Malone
- Programmers: Nolan Martin; Michael Maynard; James T. Row
- Artists: Adrian Carmack; Jerry K. Jones; Carol Ludden; Steven Maines
- Engine: Prototype of Wolfenstein 3D engine
- Platforms: DOS, Windows, MacOS
- Release: DOS; November 1992; Catacombs Pack; Windows, OS X; March 2013
- Genre: First-person shooter
- Mode: Single-player

Catacomb Abyss (also known as The Catacomb Abyss or The Catacomb Abyss 3-D) is a fantasy themed first-person shooter game developed by Softdisk and released in November 1992 for DOS. It is the fourth entry in the Catacomb series of video games. Its predecessor, Catacomb 3-D, was developed by id Software as part of a contract with Softdisk. When the contract ended, Softdisk kept ownership of both the 3D engine as well as the intellectual property of Catacomb 3-D. The company formed a new, in-house team to develop three sequels, known as the Catacomb Adventure Series. This trilogy consists of Catacomb Abyss, Catacomb Armageddon and Catacomb Apocalypse. Softdisk published a shareware version of Catacomb Abyss, which could be freely distributed and played to encourage gamers to purchase the full trilogy.

The plot is a continuation of the events in Catacomb 3-D. The player again takes the role of the high wizard Petton Everhail. After the death of arch-rival Nemesis, his minions construct a mausoleum near the Towne Cemetery to honor their deceased master. Soon evil forces start to emerge around the mausoleum. It is once again up to Petton Everhail to end the terror with the use of his magic spells. The gameplay consists of navigating through the town cemetery, the mausoleum and other environments, while battling the servants of Nemesis with magic spells. Keys need to be collected to unlock doors. The game also contains an item shaped like an hourglass, which temporarily freezes time when picked up.

PC Gamer did a retrospective review of Catacomb Abyss in 2021. The reviewer describes the game as "incredibly primitive", yet also "an interesting glimpse at a direction shooters could have gone, had Wolfenstein and Doom not laid down the templates for the next few years".

== Gameplay ==
The gameplay borrows many elements from Catacomb 3-D. The player searches for keys in a maze to unlock doors that grant access to the next level. To aid navigation, each area within a level has a short description, which is displayed on the interface. The player can shoot magic missiles from its hand to eliminate enemies and to destroy breakable wall segments.

The game contains sixteen regular levels. The final level contains instructions to warp to any level, including three secret levels. Whereas the levels in Catacomb 3-D consisted of mostly dungeons, the levels in Catacomb Abyss bring more varied environments. There are outdoor levels with lightning, an ancient aqueduct flooded with water and hellish corridors with pulsing walls. The five types of enemies from Catacomb 3-D return in Catacomb Abyss, along with several new enemies. Some of these can pop up unexpectedly, such as zombies that rise from the ground and skeleton warriors that emerge from a dirt wall.

Screenshot of the first-person view in Catacomb Abyss

Just like in its predecessor, the player can pick up bolts, nukes and potions, although they are renamed into respectively Zappers, Xterminators and Cures. Functionally they behave the same: a Zapper generates a stream of magic missiles, an Xterminator shoots magic missiles in a circular pattern and a Cure restores the players health back to 100%. There are also treasure chests which provide a random combination of these three items. The player can carry a maximum of 99 of each item. Items can be accidentally destroyed when hit by a magic missile.

Catacomb Abyss introduces a radar called the Crystal Sphere, which shows the magic missiles and nearby enemies. Initially enemies will not show up on the Crystal Sphere. The player can collect up to a total of five gems to unlock the visibility of enemy types on the Crystal Sphere. The game also introduces an item shaped like an hourglass. When picked up, time temporarily freezes. This enables the player to line up many magic missiles in front of frozen enemies, which will get hit once time resumes.

== Plot ==
In the previous game, the wizard Petton Everhail went on a quest through the catacombs to rescue his friend Grelminar from the evil mage Nemesis. Eventually the protagonist succeeded in killing Nemesis. After the death of their master, the minions of Nemesis construct a mausoleum near the Towne Cemetery to honor him. Soon after the construction of the mausoleum, evil forces spread across the land. In response to the terror, the local townspeople hire Petton Everhail to once again go on a quest against the forces of Nemesis. The protagonist starts his quest in the town cemetery, before descending into the crypts deep beneath the mausoleum.

== Development ==
The Catacomb series started when programmer John Carmack developed Catacomb, a two-dimensional game with a top-down perspective for the Apple II. In 1990 Carmack joined Softdisk, a software company based in Shreveport, Louisiana. There he worked on a bi-monthly disk magazine called Gamer's Edge, which was started by game developer John Romero in August. Customers could subscribe to Gamer's Edge to receive one or more PC games from Softdisk at a two-month interval. These games were developed fulltime by John Carmack, John Romero, Adrian Carmack and Lane Roathe, with some additional game and level design by Tom Hall. For the first issue of Gamer's Edge, John Carmack ported his Catacomb game to DOS. In September, Carmack developed an efficient way to rapidly side-scroll graphics. John Romero immediately saw great potential in this new technology. They decided to secretly borrow company equipment to incorporate this technology into their own game: Commander Keen in Invasion of the Vorticons. This game was released through the video game publisher Apogee Software on December 14 of the same year. Commander Keen was released using the shareware distribution model; the first episode was offered as a free download, while the remaining two episodes were available for purchase as a mailed plastic bag with floppy disks. Commander Keen became a commercial success. It didn't take long for Softdisk CEO Al Vekovius to find out that his employees had used company equipment to release a game via a competitive publisher. Nevertheless, Vekovius felt that the company was reliant on the Gamer's Edge subscriptions and tried to convince the team to form a new company in partnership with Softdisk. After several weeks of negotiation, the team agreed to produce a series of games for Softdisk, one every two months. On February 1, 1991, John Carmack, John Romero, Tom Hall and Adrian Carmack founded their own game company, called id Software.

Some of the games that id Software developed for Softdisk utilized the side-scrolling technology from Commander Keen, but John Carmack also used this opportunity to further experiment with his game engines. He developed a 3D engine for the vehicular combat game Hovertank 3D, which was published by Softdisk in April 1991. In November this 3D engine was expanded upon with texture mapping for Catacomb 3-D. At the end of 1991 the publishing contract with Softdisk ended. The team at id Software started development of their next game Wolfenstein 3D, to be published by Apogee Software.

Due to the publishing contract with id Software, Softdisk obtained ownership of both the 3D engine as well as the intellectual property of Catacomb 3-D. This enabled the company to create additional 3D games in the Catacomb series, but a completely new in-house team of game developers had to be formed at Softdisk to fill the gap that was left by the founders of id Software. Head of the new team became game designer Greg Malone, who had previously designed Moebius and its sequel Windwalker. He was joined by programmers Mike Maynard and Jim Row. Some of the enemy designs that Adrian Carmack created for Catacomb 3-D were reused in Catacomb Abyss, but most of the artwork in the game was produced from scratch by artists Jerry K. Jones, Carol Ludden and Steven Maines. The new team spent most of 1992 to produce Catacomb Abyss and its sequels Catacomb Armageddon and Catacomb Apocalypse. Near the end of 1992, Gamer's Edge was discontinued. Mike Maynard and Jim Row left Softdisk to form their own game development company JAM Productions, where they developed Blake Stone: Aliens of Gold. Game designer Greg Malone would later become the creative director for Duke Nukem 3D.

== Release ==
With around 3000 subscribers, the disk magazine Gamer's Edge never became a commercial success. Therefore, after having witnessed the success of the shareware title Commander Keen, Softdisk management decided to adopt the shareware model for Catacomb Abyss. Gamers could freely play and distribute the shareware version of Catacomb Abyss. Included with the shareware version was an electronic catalog, which advertised the registered version of Catacomb Abyss, as well as the two sequels Catacomb Armageddon and Catacomb Apocalypse. Customers could call Softdisk to order these three games. The registered version of Catacomb Abyss comes packaged with a hint manual, but otherwise contains the same set of levels as the shareware version.

The Catacomb series were acquired by the software company Flat Rock Software in 2012, who sold the games as downloads via their site flatrocksoft.com. In March 2013, the Catacomb series were published on GOG.com as the Catacombs Pack. The DOS emulator DOSBox is included with the Catacombs Pack to enable support for Microsoft Windows and Linux.

== Reception ==
Reception

Review score
Publication	Score
PC Joker	65%

=== Contemporary reviews ===
American computer game magazine Computer Gaming World published a review in May 1993. It calls The Catacomb Abyss "very enjoyable" despite the "minimal" EGA graphics and sound. The review warns that some gamers might experience motion sickness due to the game's 3-D smooth scrolling technique.

British video game magazine PC Zone also noted in May 1993 that the 3D graphics do not scroll as smooth compared to Wolfenstein 3D. On long playthroughs this can become irritating, but the reviewer also states that the gameplay in the Catacomb series is better compared to Wolfenstein 3D. They praised "the atmosphere of real tension" in the games and considered Catacomb Abyss a good showcase of what shareware games can offer.

German PC gaming magazine PC Games reported in their March 1993 issue that Catacomb Abyss was brought on the German market as an alternative to the id Software game Hundefelsen 3D. At that time German gamers used Hundefelsen 4C as a codename for Wolfenstein 3D, a game that was banned in Germany for portraying Nazis. The review from PC Games states that "Catacomb Abyss is very playable and fascinating due to the well animated 3D perspective". The reviewer warns that a fast computer is required, as the game is a "first class resource guzzler", but "the great 3D graphics contribute a lot to the atmosphere and the fun of the game".

German video gaming magazine PC Joker reviewed the Catacomb 3D Adventure series in their November 1993 issue. According to the review, the "well camouflaged secrets, variety of bonus items lying around, hidden scrolls, nice graphics and fine sounds create a mood". It concludes that "right from the start, the game has made a passable figure on the full-price market".

=== Retrospective reception ===
PC Gamer did a retrospective review of Catacomb Abyss in 2021 and describes the game as "incredibly primitive", containing "some of the most eye-poppingly awful wall textures ever". What makes the game interesting is the different design choices compared to popular contemporary games. As such it offers "an interesting glimpse at a direction shooters could have gone, had Wolfenstein and Doom not laid down the templates for the next few years". PC Gamer describes the ability to freeze time as an "extremely cool" feature that resembles the visual effect known as bullet time.

The review from gaming website GameFAQs states that Catacomb Abyss is graphically a bit better compared to Catacomb 3-D, with better use of the color palette and some interesting effects, like animated walls, a level flooded with water and lightning in outdoor levels. On the downside, the game is considered to be too easy.

YouTube game reviewer GmanLives also notes that Catacomb Abyss has slightly better graphics and a wider variety of enemies and environments compared to its predecessor. He dislikes that some keys that are required for progression are hidden behind unmarked, breakable walls. Furthermore, he could easily finish the game within two hours, which made it feel more like an expansion pack rather than a full game.

== Sequels ==
=== Catacomb Armageddon ===
Catacomb Armageddon
- Developer: Softdisk
- Publishers: Softdisk; Froggman
- Designer: Greg Malone
- Programmers: Nolan Martin; Michael Maynard; James T. Row
- Artists: Jerry K. Jones; Carol Ludden; Steven Maines
- Engine: Prototype of Wolfenstein 3D engine
- Platform: DOS
- Release: 1992
- Genre: First-person shooter
- Mode: Single-player

Catacomb Armageddon (also known as The Catacomb Armageddon 3-D or as Curse of the Catacombs) is a fantasy themed first-person shooter (FPS) game developed by Softdisk. It was released in 1992 for DOS as the second title in a trilogy known as the Catacomb 3-D Adventure Series.

The plot picks up after the events in Catacomb Abyss. After his evil forces were defeated by the player, arch rival Nemesis retreated from the catacombs and regrouped with a new army in the "Towne of Morbidity". While in pursuit of Nemesis, the player arrives at the town. This marks the start of a new quest, which takes the player through the "Dark Forest", the "Lost City of the Damned" and various other hazardous locations.

The core gameplay in Catacomb Armageddon is largely the same as in its predecessor. The main differences between Catacomb Armageddon and Catacomb Abyss are in the design of the enemies and environments. The game contains sixteen levels, with environments such as a dark forest, a torture chamber and a giant ant colony. The "Demon's Hold" is a prison area where two-headed red demons are trapped behind force fields. Before these demons can be battled, the player has to release them from their prison cells by shooting the force fields. "The Crystal Maze" contains a large room, filled with monsters, a red key and a maze of invisible walls. The player can navigate through the maze by sliding along the invisible walls.

Among the monsters in Catacomb Armageddon are giant ants that when defeated keep twitching their legs in a puddle of green blood. The dark forest houses evil trees that chase the player. Trees that get hit by the player will remain burning, such that the player needs to carefully walk around them. Other enemies include killer rabbits, skeletons, succubi, evil eyes and mages. The final boss is Nemesis, but the player also encounters multiple clones of him.

At its initial release in 1992, Catacomb Armageddon could only be ordered directly at Softdisk, either via phone or mail. In 1993, the game was re-released for the retail market under the title Curse of the Catacombs by the short-lived publishing company Froggman. The Froggman release has a different introduction screen to accommodate for the changed title. It also introduced a broadly smiling cartoon frog on the HUD. According to PC Gamer, due to the inclusion of this frog "all atmosphere was completely knifed through the gut".

American game magazine Computer Gaming World reviewed Curse of the Catacombs in their October 1993 issue. When making a comparison with The Catacomb Abyss, the review states that Curse of the Catacombs contains "more of the same monster bashing and maze crashing excitement". Despite the "primitive" 16-color EGA graphics and "minimal" sound effects, it concludes that the game offers good value for its relatively low retail price.

=== Catacomb Apocalypse ===
Catacomb Apocalypse
- Developer: Softdisk
- Publishers: Softdisk; Froggman
- Designer: Greg Malone
- Programmers: Nolan Martin; Michael Maynard; James T. Row
- Artists: Jerry K. Jones; Carol Ludden; Steven Maines
- Engine: Prototype of Wolfenstein 3D engine
- Platform: DOS
- Release: 1993
- Genre: First-person shooter
- Mode: Single-player

Catacomb Apocalypse (also known as The Catacomb Apocalypse 3-D or as Terror of the Catacombs) is a fantasy themed first-person shooter (FPS) game developed by Softdisk. It was released in 1993 for DOS as the third title in a trilogy known as the Catacomb 3-D Adventure Series.

The plot revolves around arch rival Nemesis using time travel to recruit robots and cyborgs from the future. These mechanized monsters join the ranks of the regular fantasy themed enemies in a final attempt to defeat the player. Among the futuristic enemies are mechanical flies, android mages and drones. They are mixed with fantasy creatures such as wizards, skeletons and blue demons. The environments include a garden, a flooded city and a computer core. Catacomb Apocalypse reintroduces a non-linear hub system, which was previously used in Catacomb 3-D. Consequently, sometimes the player can choose between multiple levels to go to. A new feature in this game, that wasn't in the previous Catacomb titles, are walls that appear solid, but which allow the player to pass through.

At its initial release in 1993, Catacomb Apocalypse could only be ordered directly at Softdisk, either via phone or mail. That same year, the game was re-released for the retail market under the title Terror of the Catacombs by the short-lived publishing company Froggman.

American game magazine Computer Gaming World reviewed Terror of the Catacombs in their February 1994 issue. The review states that the game offers the same gameplay and visuals as the earlier Catacomb games, which has the downside that the graphics are still limited to 16-color EGA, but despite the "lackluster visuals", the review concludes that "playability is good, almost addictive, and offers bang for the buck".

== Legacy ==
Following the publication of the Catacomb series on GOG, Flat Rock Software decided to open-source these games under the GPL license in 2014. This enabled programmers to port the source code of Catacomb Abyss to other operating systems. The source port Reflection Keen, later renamed to ReflectionHLE, allows gamers to play Catacomb Abyss on Microsoft Windows, Linux, MacOS, AmigaOS and Android.

Another source port for Catacomb Abyss called CatacombGL was introduced in 2018, which offers hardware accelerated rendering via OpenGL. CatacombGL initially targeted Microsoft Windows. Support for native Linux was added in 2022.

== Sources ==
- Kushner, David (2004). Masters of Doom: How Two Guys Created an Empire and Transformed Pop Culture. Random House. ISBN 978-0-8129-7215-3.
- Moss, Richard (January 10, 2023). Shareware Heroes: The renegades who redefined gaming at the dawn of the internet. Unbound Publishing. ISBN 978-1-80018-110-6.
