= ScubaVenture: The Search for Pirate's Treasure =

1993 video game

- Title screen
- Developer(s): Apogee Software
- Publisher(s): Softdisk
- Designer(s): George Broussard
- Programmer(s): John Romero
- Engine: F.A.S.T. Game System
- Platform(s): DOS
- Release: December 31, 1993
- Genre(s): Action
- Mode(s): Single-player

ScubaVenture: The Search for Pirate's Treasure is a 1993 action video game. The game was developed by Apogee on contract for Softdisk in 1991, and was marketed as a Softdisk game; Apogee developed the title on behalf of id Software (being the final game they owed Softdisk), in order to let them focus on developing Wolfenstein 3D (1992).

== Plot ==
The player character dives in the Caribbean sea to search the sunken wreck of the Barbarosa to search for treasure and uncover the mystery being disappearing explorers.

== Gameplay ==
The player swims around a number of shipwreck levels with a speargun with limited harpoons for attacking enemies. The player also has a limited oxygen supply and vitality. Vitality is replenished with collectible hearts and oxygen is refilled by picking up tanks.
