= Lolapps =

Video game developer and publisher

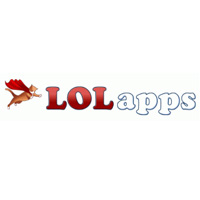
- Industry: Video games
- Founded: 2007; 19 years ago
- Founder: Brian Rue, Kamo Asatryan, Annie Chang, Kavin Stewart
- Successor: 6waves Lolapps
- Products: Ravenwood Fair

Lolapps was a developer and publisher of social games on the Facebook platform. Lolapps was best known for creating Ravenwood Fair with John Romero which had 25 million players worldwide.

In 2011, Lolapps merged with social games publisher 6waves to become 6waves Lolapps. Combined, the companies had 35 million monthly active users, which made 6waves Lolapps the second largest game publisher on Facebook behind Zynga.

== History ==
Lolapps was founded in 2007 by Brian Rue, Kamo Asatryan, Annie Chang, and Kavin Stewart. It started with Quiz Creator, a Facebook app that allowed users to create their own quizzes and invite their friends to play. Based on the growth of Quiz Creator and Gift Creator—a gift creation app—the company raised $4.5 million in funding from Polaris Partners in the fall of 2008.

In 2009, Lolapps acquired social gaming company Roflplay and its founder, Arjun Sethi, became CEO of Lolapps. By 2010, Lolapps had 100 million users, making it competitive in social gaming with Zynga and CrowdStar.

Game designer Brenda Romero joined Lolapps in May 2010. She brought on John Romero to work on Lolapps' new title Ravenwood Fair, which launched in October 2010. By March 2011, Ravenwood Fair had 25 million users worldwide.

In July 2011, Lolapps merged with social games publisher 6waves to form 6waves Lolapps. Later that year in August, South Korean video game publisher Nexon invested $35 million on 6waves Lolapps.

In March 2012, 6waves Lolapps laid off its development team—many of whom came from the Lolapps merger—to focus on game publishing. Later in March, 6waves Lolapps rebranded itself as 6waves, dropping Lolapps from its name.

In January 2022, Stillfront Group acquired 6waves for $201M.

== Controversy ==
In October 2010, the Wall Street Journal discovered that a number of Facebook apps—including Lolapps apps—were transmitting Facebook user data to third parties like ad networks and user tracking services.

The Journal found that some LOLapps applications, as well as the Family Tree application, were transmitting users' Facebook ID numbers to [internet tracking service] RapLeaf. RapLeaf then linked those ID numbers to dossiers it had previously assembled on those individuals, according to RapLeaf. RapLeaf then embedded that information in an Internet-tracking file known as a "cookie."

Facebook considered this a policy violation and suspended Lolapps and other offending apps. Two days later, Lolapps came back online after dissolving its relationship with RapLeaf.
