= Brenda Romero =

American video game designer and developer

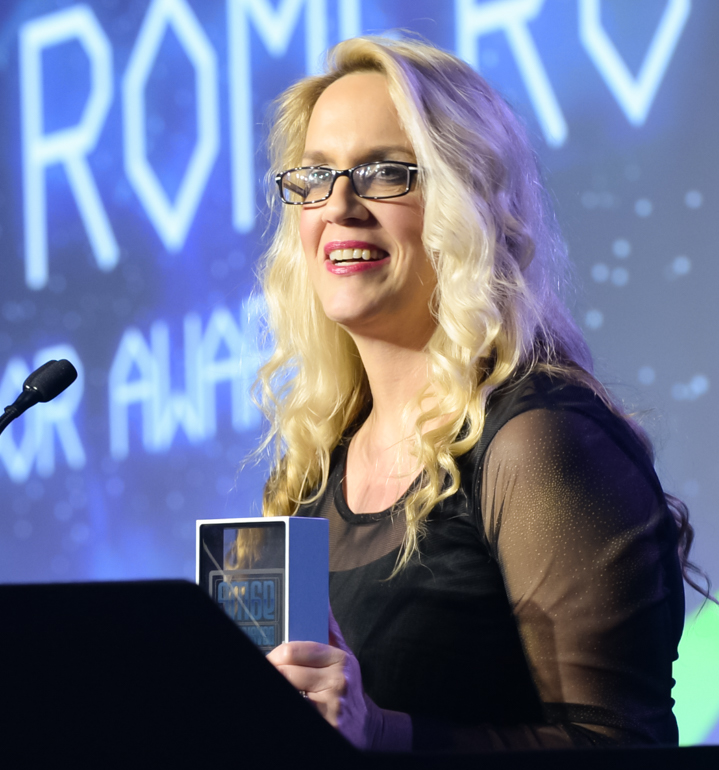
- Romero at 2015 IGF Awards-GDCA
- Born: Brenda Louise Garno; October 12, 1966 (age 60); Ogdensburg, New York, U.S.
- Other name: Brenda Brathwaite
- Occupation: Video game designer
- Years active: 1981–present
- Known for: Wizardry 8
- Spouse: John Romero (m. 2012)
- Children: 3

Brenda Louise Romero (née Garno; born October 12, 1966), previously known as Brenda Brathwaite, is an American game designer and developer. She was born in Ogdensburg, New York and is a graduate of Clarkson University. Romero is best known for her work on the Wizardry series of role-playing video games and, more recently, the non-digital series The Mechanic is the Message. She has worked in game development since 1981 and has credits on 49 game titles.

For Wizardry, Romero provided game design, level design, system design, writing, and scripting. She also wrote the manuals and documentation for some products in the series. Romero provided writing and documentation for the award-winning Jagged Alliance series. She was the lead designer for Playboy: The Mansion and Dungeons & Dragons: Heroes.

== Career ==
Romero began her career in 1981 at video game developer and publisher Sir-tech Software, Inc., on the Wizardry role-playing team. She worked first as a tester, and moved up through the ranks to designer for Wizardry 8. While at Sir-tech, Romero also worked on the Jagged Alliance and Realms of Arkania series. She was employed with Sir-tech for 18 years before moving on to Atari where she worked on the Dungeons & Dragons series for consoles before joining Cyberlore Studios in 2003 to work on the Playboy: The Mansion game. Romero's research for the game was ultimately published in a book, Sex in Video Games.

Nerve magazine cited her as a "New Radical" — one of "the 50 artists, actors, authors, activists and icons who are making the world a more stimulating place".

In 2009, Next Generation magazine identified her as the woman with the longest continuous service in video game development.

Romero served as Chair of the Savannah College of Art and Design's Interactive Design and Game Development department until November 2009. She moved to San Francisco to consult as Creative Director for social media company Slide, Inc., and then became Creative Director of social gaming company Lolapps in May 2010. She co-founded the social game company Loot Drop with John Romero in November 2010, then left Lolapps and joined Loot Drop in February 2011.

In 2013, Romero became the first game designer in residence at the Games and Playable Media Program of the University of California, Santa Cruz. She also served as the program's director.

Romero was the Program Director of the MSc program in Game Design and Development at the University of Limerick in Limerick, Ireland until December 2018.

== Recognition ==
Romero has won several awards in her long career. Some highlights include RPG of the Year for Wizardry 8, a Fulbright Scholar award in 2014, the Game Developer's Choice Ambassador Award in 2015, the Development Legend award at the Develop:Brighton awards. Romero was also invited to give a Ted Talk about her career within the game industry, in which she explains how she incorporates tragic history lessons into her game design.

Date	Award	Description
2018	Honorific Award	Awarded by the Fun & Serious Game Festival
2018	Top 10 Most Influential Women in Game Development	Awarded in recognition of Brenda's most popular games.
2017	BAFTA Special Award	Awarded in recognition of her creative contribution to the industry.
2017	Development Legend	Awarded at Develop:Brighton
2015	Ambassador Award	Awarded at Game Developers Conference in San Francisco for helping the game industry advance to a better place.
2014	Fulbright U.S. Specialist Award	To carry out master classes and curriculum reviews of Digital Games courses at a number of Irish universities.
2014	100 Most Influential Tech Women on Twitter	Named #74 by Business Insider
2013	Top 10 Game Developers of 2013	Awarded a position on the list by Gamasutra
2013	Lifetime Achievement Award	The Women in Gaming session at GDC 2013 honoured Brenda Romero with an award for her service to the industry.
2009	Vanguard Award	IndieCade awarded Brenda the Vanguard Award for Train.
2008	Top 20 Women in Games	Gamasutra named Brenda one of the Top 20 Women in Games.
2006	Top 100 Most Influential Women in the Game Industry	Next Generation named Brenda one of the 100 Most Influential Women in the Game Industry.
2001	RPG of the Year	Wizardry 8 awarded RPG of the Year by Computer Gaming World

== Personal life ==
Brenda Garno married game developer John Romero on October 27, 2012. She has three children from her first marriage.

John and Brenda worked on Ravenwood Fair together. He was lead designer and she was creative director and game designer.

== IGDA and activism ==
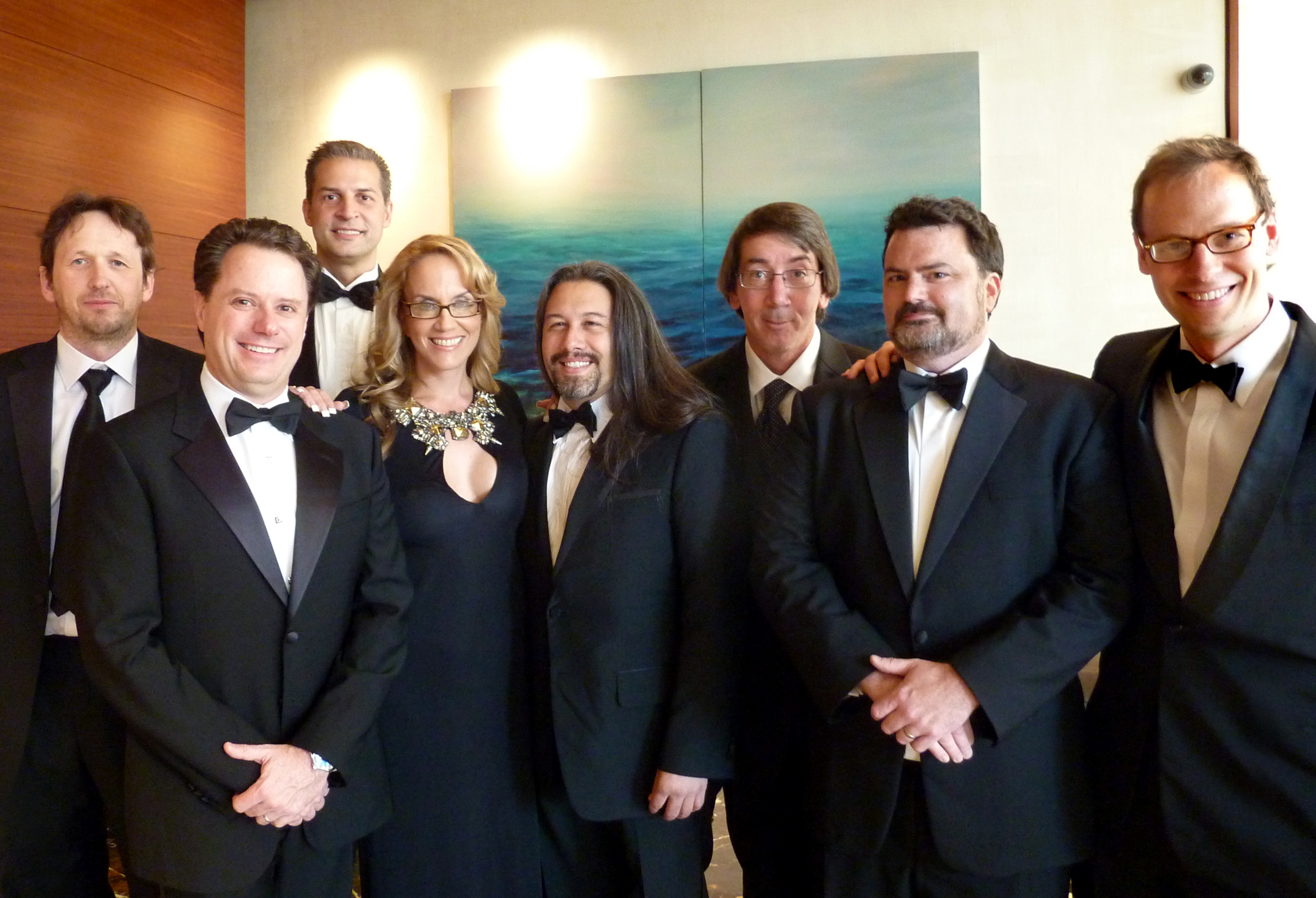
Brenda and other game developers at a BAFTA event in Los Angeles in July 2011. From left: Rod Humble, Louis Castle, David Perry, Brenda Romero, John Romero, Will Wright, Tim Schafer, Chris Hecker.

Brenda Romero was an active member of the International Game Developers Association (IGDA). In 2008, she was elected to the IGDA's Board of Directors. On March 28, 2013, she resigned as co-chair of the IGDA Women in Games SIG.

She had founded the International Game Developers Sex Special Interest Group (Sex SIG) in 2005. Since working on Playboy, she has studied adult and sexual content in video games and is regularly interviewed about the subject in the media. She has written a book on the subject, Sex in Video Games.

She is an anti-censorship activist and a proponent of parental rating awareness.

== Academics ==
She is a regular speaker at universities and conferences, including the Game Developers Conference, Austin Game Developers Conference, and Montreal International Games Summit. Some of her lectures have been held at the Massachusetts Institute of Technology, The Guildhall at Southern Methodist University, and Clarkson University.

In the spring of 2007, she was awarded the Presidential Fellowship at Savannah College of Art and Design to develop an exhibit and presentation titled, "What You Don't Know About Video Games...". In April 2008, Romero became Chair of the Interactive Design and Game Development department at the Savannah College of Art and Design (SCAD). Brathwaite left SCAD in November 2009 to return to full-time commercial game development.

In December 2012, she was appointed "Game Designer in Residence" at the University of California, Santa Cruz.

In March 2014, she was awarded a Fulbright Fellowship.

== The Mechanic is the Message ==
In February 2008, Romero began work on a series of non-digital games known collectively as The Mechanic is the Message. According to the series abstract:

The Mechanic is the Message captures and expresses difficult experiences through the medium of a game. Much like photographs, paintings, literature and music are capable of transmitting the full range of the human experience from one human to another, so too can games. Due to their interactivity, the installation suggests that games are capable of a higher form of communication, one which actively engages the participant and makes them a part of the experience rather than a passive observer.

The series is composed of six separate non-digital games that experiment with the traditional notions of games.

- The New World, 2008
- Síochán leat, 2009
- Train, 2009
- Mexican Kitchen Workers – prototype
- Cité Soleil - concept phase
- One Falls for Each of Us – concept phase

Of the six, Train has received the most attention, and won the Vanguard Award at Indiecade in October 2009 for "pushing the boundaries of game design and showing us what games can do." Train was also featured in The Wall Street Journal as well as on game industry sites including Gamasutra, where it received accolades for its ability to evoke meaning through gestures, the Escapist Magazine, Extra Credits, and on Kotaku. Romero delivered Train: How I Dumped Electricity and Learned to Love Design at the 2010 Gamesauce Conference.

Síochán leat (Irish for "peace be with you") chronicles the history of her children's heritage. Romero made the game following The New World, a game she originally made to teach her daughter about the slave trade. Romero designed Síochán leat to teach her daughter about her Irish heritage and traces the family's history from the Cromwellian invasion of Ireland to their ancestor's eventual immigration into the West Indies on the paternal side and Canada on the maternal side. The game features a burlap pillow simulating an earthen mound covered by 26 pieces of grass, each representing a county in Ireland. In a talk given at the Austin Game Developers Conference in September 2009, Romero noted that the burlap was filled with mementos of her upbringing and her heritage, including photographs of her great grandfather, Paddy Donovan, and one of her mother's rosaries. On her blog, Romero notes that "the game is signed in many ways and is highly autobiographical. It is my history and it also reveals my feelings about its present state."

== Ludography ==
Name	Year	Credit
Druid: Daemons of the Mind	1995	Game and manual writer, tester
Nemesis: The Wizardry Adventure	1996	Manual and dialogue writer, scripter
Jagged Alliance 2	1999	Writer
Jagged Alliance 2: Unfinished Business	2000	Game and manual writer
Wizardry 8	2001	Game designer, game and manual writer
Dungeons & Dragons: Heroes	2003	Lead designer
Playboy: The Mansion	2005	Lead designer, manual writer
Playboy: The Mansion - Private Party	2005	Game designer
Ravenwood Fair	2010	Game designer
Tom Clancy's Ghost Recon: Commander	2012	Director, lead designer, writer
Pettington Park	2012	Game designer
Dodger Down	2013	Game designer, tester
Gunman Taco Truck	2017	Game designer
Empire of Sin	2020	Game designer

== Bibliography ==
- Sex in Video Games is a nonfiction book about the history of sex content in video games.
- Challenges for Game Designers is a non-fiction book that aims to challenge and improves your game design abilities.
- Game Balance is a nonfiction book about balancing computer, video and non-digital games.
- Breaking Into the Game Industry: Advice for a Successful Career From Those Who Have Done It is a non-fiction book about how to get into the game industry with advice from several game industry professionals.
