= The Lost Crown of Queen Anne =

- Developer: Robert Wayne Atkins
- Publisher: Softdisk
- Platforms: MS-DOS, Commodore 64
- Release: 1987
- Genre: Adventure
- Mode: Single-player

The Lost Crown of Queen Anne is a text-based adventure computer game written by Robert Wayne Atkinsfor the Commodore 64 and MS-DOS and is a part of the Classic Adventure Series. It was also included on Big Blue Disk #28 and Loadstar #57.

In the game, the player must find Queen Anne's crown. In the game's fictional plot, the crown went missing shortly after the Queen's death in 1714, and was last known to be in the possession of a Sheikh in the Arabian Desert.

== Plot ==
The game begins in the Arabian Desert, where the player's camel has gone lame, and they are out of food and water. Throughout the game, the player must avoid starvation, dehydration, poison traps, and other dangers. The game ends when the player either finds the crown, or dies.

Certain elements of the game are randomized. Although text-based, the screen is split into a map, area description, and inventory of items. At the bottom of the screen are statistics such as hunger, thirst, number of treasures found, total moves, and score.

== Legacy ==
The game was made available by the developer (together with the other games of his career) for download free of charge in 2003.
