= Ravenwood Fair =

2010 video game

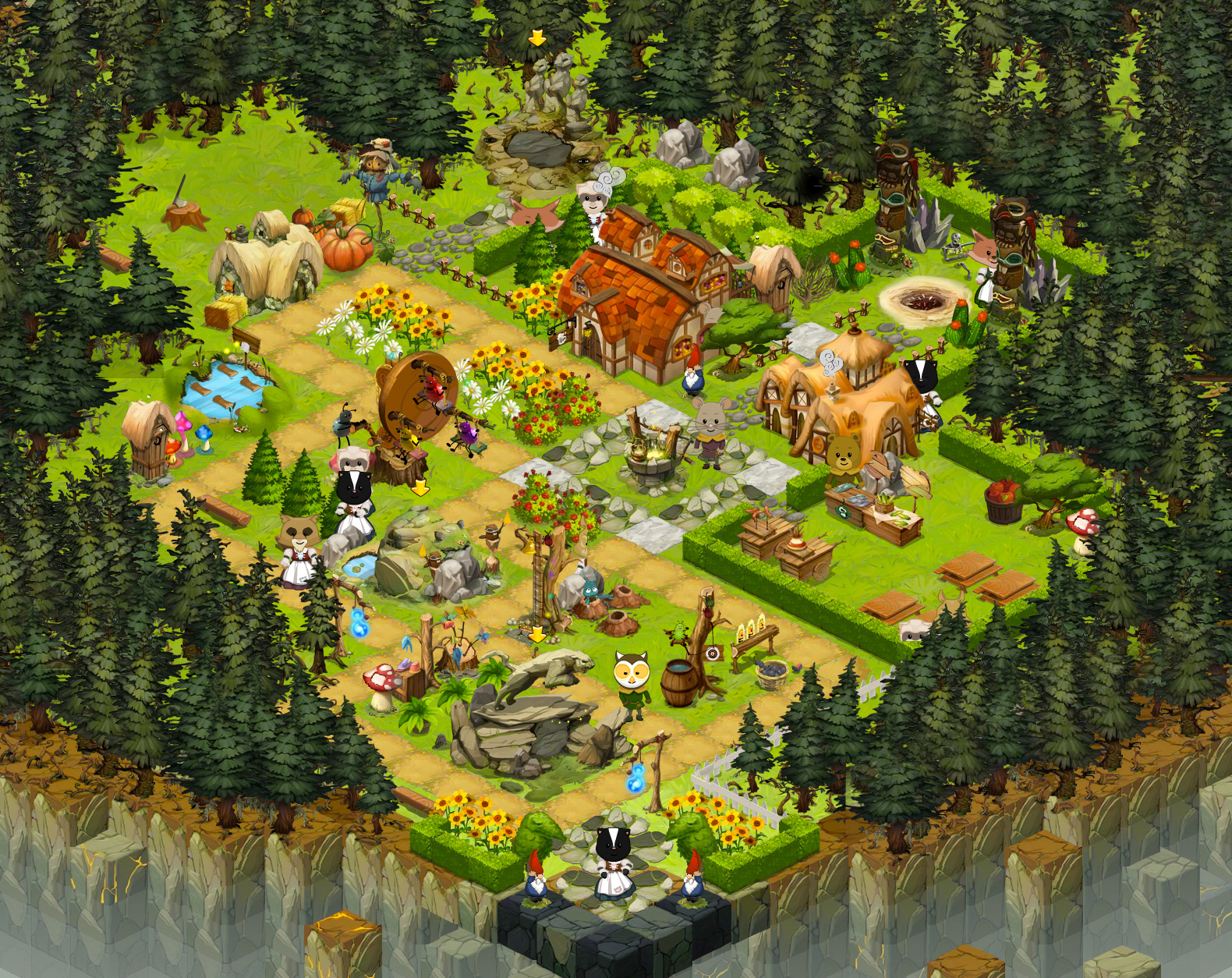
- Developer: Lolapps
- Publishers: Lolapps, Inc.
- Designers: John Romero; Brenda Brathwaite
- Platform: Facebook Platform
- Release: October 19, 2010
- Genres: Business sim, RPG
- Mode: Single player with multiplayer interaction

Ravenwood Fair was a social network game on Facebook designed by John Romero and developed by Lolapps. Ravenwood Fair was launched on the Facebook platform October 19, 2010. The game closed down on July 18, 2013.

== Overview ==
The object of the game was to build a fun fair in the midst of a scary forest while decorating the grounds, fending off various monsters, and completing many quests. Players built games and buildings which attract visitors to the fair, and visitors became scared if they see a monster or the forest erupts near them. Players comforted the visitors when they were scared so they could go back to their normal routine of enjoying the fair.

== Gameplay ==
The player selects an avatar which resembles a woodland animal - either a raccoon (named Rita) or bear (named Randy). The player then completes a short tutorial that shows how to chop trees, pick up loot drops, then build a hotdog cart. After the tutorial, the player is given several quests that direct gameplay toward accumulating materials, building structures, or purchasing decorations and placing them.

The player has an energy bar which determines how many major actions the player can take in a session. More energy can be purchased with mushrooms or Facebook credits to extend gameplay. Mushrooms randomly drop from trees that are chopped down.

Chopping trees and roots are a large part of gameplay. One chop on a tree or root will use an energy. Loot drops from the chopped tree or root and will contain coins, XP (experience points), and often materials needed for quests and building structures. Sometimes a monster, such as a Critter Bear or Domovoi, will appear as a result of chopping a tree and the player can either ignore the monster or pummel it with a shovel to scare it away.

When the player finishes building a structure, the "fun" value attached to the structure accumulates with all other structures in the fair. At various "fun" levels, visitors will fly in on a zeppelin and roam the player's fair, playing games and using buildings and paying coins and XP for them.

All during gameplay, the scary forest erupts randomly with evil laughter, will-o-wisps, or a frightening crow. If a visitor is near a scary part of the forest, the visitor will scream and run to the player for comfort. The player must then click on the scared visitor to comfort them so they can continue enjoying the fair. If the player places a Protector on the ground, it will be able to retaliate against the forest, attack monsters, and comfort the scared visitors.

After the player gathers enough XP, they will level up and have their energy meter filled, and possibly extended. Attaining levels will affect the game in various ways, such as unlocking items for purchase in the store (called Ye Olde Shoppe), new quests becoming available, new monsters appearing when trees are chopped, etc.

== Popularity ==
As of March 2011, Ravenwood Fair had approximately 25 million players worldwide.

Ravenwood Fair has launched on several other social networks such as Japan's Mixi, IMVU, South America's Orkut, and Germany's StudiVZ. The game can be played in 9 languages: English, Spanish, Mandarin Chinese, Turkish, Italian, Indonesian, German, French, and Portuguese.

== Development ==
Lolapps began working on a game called Critter Town in January 2010 using Sean Cooper's fl<iso> engine. This game was redesigned multiple times over a 7-month period, until Lolapps asked Brenda Brathwaite, their new Creative Director, for help in finishing the game. Brathwaite suggested bringing in John Romero to redesign the game and lead it to completion. Romero arrived at Lolapps on August 1, 2010 and worked with a team of 11 developers to create Ravenwood Fair and launch it on October 19, 2010.

The game is full of references to popular culture. The game has been praised for its beautiful painterly art style.

The title theme music track was composed and produced by Aaron Walz of Game Audio Alliance.

An expansion to Ravenwood Fair named Ravenstone Mine was announced in February and launched April 20, 2011.

In October 2010, Lolapps, Inc. was the subject of a shutdown by Facebook just days before Ravenwood Fair launched, due to Lolapps using an advertising company named RapLeaf. Ravenwood Fair was shut down as well a week later for 7 days before becoming fully operational again. Because of the threat of another possible shutdown, Lolapps launched Ravenwood Fair on its own website off Facebook.

On 2 February 2011, John Romero and Brenda Brathwaite gave an IGDA-sponsored presentation titled From AAA To Social Games - Developing Ravenwood Fair at Dolby Laboratories in San Francisco, CA. On 22 February 2011, Romero and Brathwaite gave a presentation at the SF Game Developer's Workshop titled A Post Mortem of Ravenwood Fair at the Art Institute of California - San Francisco.

== Further releases ==
After Ravenwood Fair, the follow-up games Ravenskye City and Ravenshire Castle were released by LOLapps. Together, these three games are referred to as RavenWorld.

The music for the game was composed by Dren McDonald & Aaron Walz. It was released, together with the music of Ravenskye City and Ravenshire Castle, on the album The Music of RavenWorld. A total of nine titles are from Ravenwood Fair and three from the extension Ravenstone Mine.

== Nominations ==
On 19 January 2011, the Academy of Interactive Arts & Sciences announced its 14th Annual Interactive Achievement Award nominees. In the category of "Social Networking Game of the Year", Ravenwood Fair was nominated along with CityVille, Family Feud, FrontierVille, and Nightclub City. CityVille ultimately won the award.
