= Will Loconto =

American musician and producer

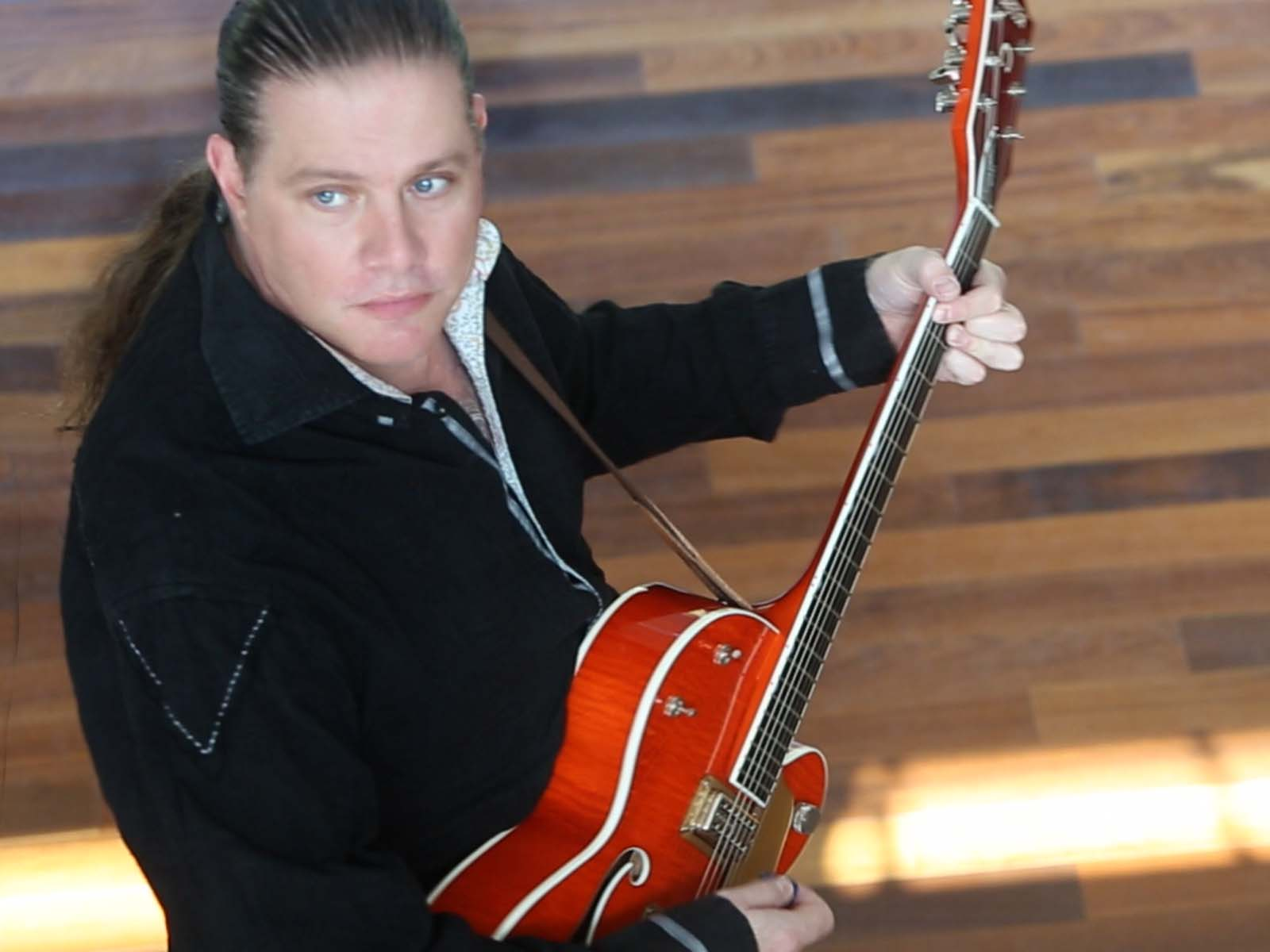
- Occupations: Musician, composer
- Years active: 31
- Known for: Information Society, T-4-2, T42

Will Loconto is a musician, composer, and producer based in Austin, Texas. He is the lead vocalist/songwriter for the U.S. band T42, was a keyboardist for the band Information Society, and has composed music for various video game soundtracks including Daikatana.

== Career ==
In 1989, Loconto replaced Jimron Goff as lead vocalist for the band T42, a Dallas area band that began in the Deep Ellum music scene in the late 1980s.

Loconto quit T42 in 1993 in order to be the keyboardist in the synth band Information Society.

Loconto left Information Society to work for Dallas-based computer game developer Ion Storm as a sound designer and composer. He was part of the initial design team for the game John Romero’s Daikatana. He left Ion Storm in November 1998 and co-founded PC and video game developer Third Law Interactive, distributed by publishing company Gathering of Developers the same year. Through Third Law Interactive, Loconto developed sound and music for Kiss: Psycho Circus: The Nightmare Child.

In 2001, he founded Will Loconto Music and Sound, and audio production company for games, television, and film.

T42 reunited in 2011 to release the album Voltage! and play several live shows. In August 2017, T42 released Hot On Top (Remastered), a remastered version of the 1989 cassette that led to their signing with Columbia Records. Decoder, their first new music since 1992 was released in October 2017. As of 2019, T42 is still playing live shows.

== Honors, decorations, awards and distinctions ==
Awards and Nominations
Year	Organization	Award	Category	Title
2009	Game Audio Network Guild Awards	Finalist	Best Original Instrumental	"The Heist" - Pictureka Museum Mayhem
2011	Hollywood Music in Media Awards	Finalist	Best Original Score for Video Game	Rage (with Assaf Rinde and Rod Abernethy)
2014	Hollywood Music in Media Awards	Finalist	Contemporary Christian/Gospel	"It's Gonna Be a Good Day" - Drew Haley and Will Loconto
2014	14th Annual Independent Music Awards	Finalist	Contemporary Christian/Gospel	"It's Gonna Be a Good Day" - Drew Haley and Will Loconto
2017	Hollywood Music in Media Awards	Finalist	EDM	"#Conspiracy (feat. Kurt Harland Larson)" - Aural Imperative
2018	Hollywood Music in Media Awards	Finalist	Lyrics/Lyricist	"Castaways (feat. Tiger Darrow)" - Interwebz - Will Loconto
2018	Hollywood Music in Media Awards	Finalist	Vocal (Female)	"Castaways (feat. Tiger Darrow)" - Interwebz

== Credits ==
Game Credits
Year	Game title	Credit
1999	Dominion: Storm Over Gift 3	Music and Sound
2000	Kiss: Psycho Circus - The Nightmare Child	Audio Designer
2000	Daikatana	Music
2000	American McGee's Alice	Sound
2001	Elite Forces WWII: Normandy	Sound
2001	WWII: Iwo Jima	Music
2001	Forgotten Realms: Baldur's Gate - Dark Alliance	Music
2001	Anachronox	Sound
2001	The Operative: No One Lives Forever GOTY Edition	Music and Sound
2002	Run Like Hell	Songs
2002	Mini Golf Master 2	Music
2002	Arthur's Quest: Battle for the Kingdom	Sound Designer
2002	Aliens vs. Predator 2: Primal Hunt	Sound Design
2004	Pitfall: The Lost Expedition	Additional Sound Design
2004	Champions of Norrath	Water’s Edge Credits Remix
2006	X-Men: The Official Game	Music and Sound
2006	Rayman Raving Rabbids	Musical Arrangements
2006	American McGee Presents: Bad Day LA	Sound Effects
2006	Over the Hedge: Hammy Goes Nuts	Audio
2007	Lanfeust de Troy	Musician
2007	WWE SmackDown! vs. RAW 2008	Audio
2007	Richard Garriott's Tabula Rasa	Audio
2008	The Incredible Hulk	Sound Effects
2008	Pictureka! Museum Mayhem	Sound and Music
2009	Treasure World	Sound design
2009	Zombie Apocalypse	Music
2011	Zombie Apocalypse: Never Die Alone	Music
2011	Rage	Additional Cinematic Musical Score
2012	The Ville	Launch Team - Audio
2016	Chronos	Outsource Partner - Audio

Discography
Year	Title	Band	Label
1989	Hot On Top	T42	Triangle Music
1990	Don't Let My Love (Push You Away) - Single	T42	Oak Lawn Records
1992	Desire - Single	T42	Columbia
1992	Let Me Go - Single	T42	Columbia
1992	Intruder	T42	Columbia
2008	Best of the Best: A Tribute to Game Music	Various Artists	Game Music Central
2011	Voltage!	T42	A Different Drum
2017	Hot On Top (Remastered)	T42	Triangle Music
