= Monkeystone Games =

Former video game developer and publisher

- Company type: Defunct
- Industry: Video games
- Founded: 2001
- Defunct: 2005
- Headquarters: Quinlan, Texas, United States
- Key people: John Romero, Founder; Tom Hall, Stevie Case, Brian Moon; Lucas Davis
- Website: Official website

Monkeystone Games was a video game developer and publisher founded by John Romero, Tom Hall, Stevie Case, and Brian Moon. After its inception in July 2001, Monkeystone published several titles on multiple platforms.

== History ==
Romero and Hall were co-founders of Ion Storm, and had previously worked together at Id Software on Doom. Case, who was Romero's girlfriend at the time, had also worked at Ion Storm as a level designer. The three of them all worked on the commercially unsuccessful video game, Daikatana, which went through a turbulent development process before releasing in 2000 to negative reviews. Case left Ion Storm in January 2001, with Romero and Hall completing Anachronox before also leaving the company in July of that year.

Romero, Hall, and Case founded Monkeystone Games in Quinlan, Texas in August 2001, in order to explore the development of mobile games. According to Case, Romero became interested in the concept of mobile games towards the end of 1999, and wanted to see what was possible on handheld devices like the Pocket PC with a new company. Romero elaborated that he founded Monkeystone with the intent of directly working on programming video games full-time alongside Hall and Case. He noted, "At Ion we were mainly working in management, managing people, but not able to do what we really wanted to do, and we were kind of torn between it." Joining the three were former Ion Storm employee Lucas Davis, as well as chief financial officer and chief operating officer Brian Moon, who previously worked for Ensemble Studios as their CFO.

In October 2001, Monkeystone announced their first game, Hyperspace Delivery Boy!, a Pocket PC title which began development in August 2001 and was released on December 23 of the same year. They also announced a partnership with ZIOSoft to collaborate on a future title. Following this, the company completed 2003's Congo Cube, which was first released on Windows but later ported to BREW and J2ME. In August 2003, THQ Wireless announced that Monkeystone would develop a version of the 2001 console video game, Red Faction, for the Nokia N-Gage. It was completed in October 2003. Monkeystone also published titles developed by third parties, such as Bust'em, Argentum, and Baseball Mogul 2003, which were all released in 2002.

Romero recalled in a later interview that the reason he left Monkeystone was because he and Case ended their romantic relationship in the spring of 2003. Describing the breakup as the "worst experience" of his life, Romero sought to leave Texas to do something else. Hall decided to join his business partner, so they both left the company in October 2003, leaving Davis to run the company in their absence. Both Romero and Hall were hired at Midway Games the same month they left Monkeystone. During this time, Monkeystone worked on a game based on The Chronicles of Riddick for the N-Gage that was eventually cancelled. According to Romero, the company moved to Austin, Texas to assist Midway Studios Austin with programming the multiplayer mode for its first-person shooter game, Area 51, enabling Romero and Hall to pay Monkeystone's business loan off in full. After Area 51's release in 2005, Monkeystone Games closed, with Romero and Hall each taking half of Monkeystone's employees with them when they both left Midway.

== Games ==
Their first in-house title, Hyperspace Delivery Boy! was first developed for the Pocket PC and released on December 23, 2001. The game was then ported to Windows, Mac, Linux and Game Boy Advance, although the Game Boy Advance version was never released. Monkeystone also published titles by third parties such as Argentum, Rocket Elite, Bust Em, Night Shift, and others.

Monkeystone's second in-house title was a puzzler called Congo Cube. They initially developed Congo Cube for Windows, then ported it to the Pocket PC, Java ME phones, and BREW phones.

Their third in-house title was a recreation of the PlayStation 2 hit Red Faction on Nokia's new gaming deck, N-Gage. It was completed in October 2003.

- Hyperspace Delivery Boy! (2001)
- Baseball Mogul 2003 (2002)
- Red Faction (2003)
- Jewels and Jim (2003)
- Congo Cube (2003)
- Dig It! (2003)
- Cartoon Network: Block Party (2004)

== Staff ==
- John Romero - Chief Executive Officer & Chief Technology Officer
- Tom Hall - President & Chief Creative Officer
- Stevie Case - Chief Operating Officer
- Lucas Davis - Studio Director & Programmer
- Jess Dominguez - Programmer
- Eric Nava - Artist
- Eric Seiler - Artist
- Billy Browning - Artist

== Closure ==
Brian Moon left Monkeystone sometime in 2002. Stevie Case left Monkeystone in mid-2003. Tom Hall and John Romero left Monkeystone in October 2003 to work at Midway Games. One of their colleagues, Lucas Davis, was left to run the day-to-day operations until the company closed in January 2005.

== Legacy ==
In 2002, former id Software John Carmack praised Monkeystone Games, particularly his former colleague Romero for transitioning into the mobile games industry. It inspired him to start his own mobile games as well beginning with Doom RPG and Orcs & Elves that were released in 2005 and 2006 respectively.
