= Stevie Case =

American professional esports player

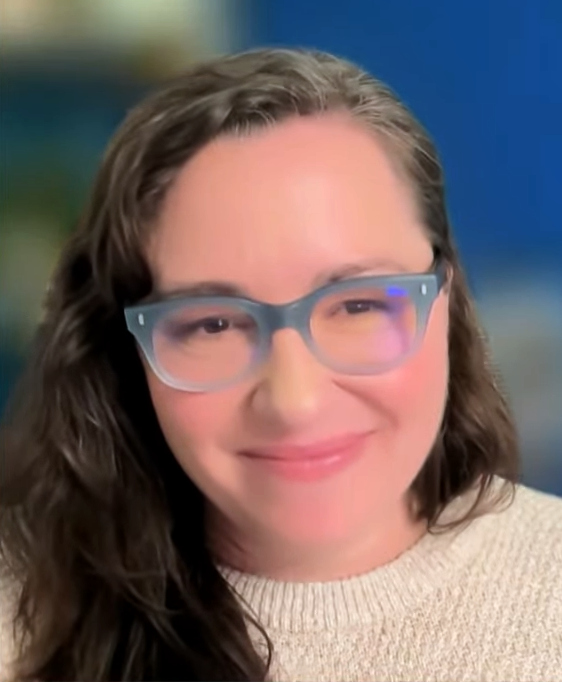
- Case in 2023
- Born: 1976 or 1977 (age 49–50)
- Education: University of Kansas
- Occupation: Chief revenue officer
- Employer: Vanta
- Partner: John Romero (1999–2003)

Esports career information
- Game: Quake
- Playing career: 1996–1997
- Handle: KillCreek

Team history
- 1996–1997: Impulse 9

Stevana "Stevie" Case (born 1976–1977) is an American technology executive and former professional video gamer. She is known for competing in the first-person shooter game Quake in the late 1990s, as well as contributing professionally to the video game industry.

Competing under the alias KillCreek, she was one of the first notable female esports players, gaining recognition for beating Quake designer John Romero in a Quake deathmatch in 1997. She was the first professional gamer signed to the Cyberathlete Professional League (CPL).

Case worked for Ion Storm between 1997 and 2001, conducting quality assurance and level design. She left the company to manage Monkeystone Games with former Ion Storm employees Romero and Tom Hall. After a stint at Warner Bros. managing the production of mobile games, she began working at various companies in business development and sales.

== Early life ==
Case was raised in Olathe, Kansas. Her parents are a science teacher and a social worker, and she has a younger brother named Andy. As a child, she enjoyed playing computer games. Her first gaming experiences were with Lode Runner and Joust on an Apple IIe computer her father bought when she was in second grade.

Case attended Olathe East High School from 1991 to 1994. As the student government president, she was one of the plaintiffs in the 1995 court case Case v. Unified School District No. 233. During the trial, students and parents in Olathe successfully challenged the school district's decision to ban Annie on My Mind from the school library. Case ran for the Kansas Legislature at seventeen years old. She later attended the University of Kansas in hopes of getting into law school.

== Career ==
=== Professional video games ===
While at the University of Kansas as a freshman studying political science, Case enjoyed playing Doom and Doom II with her circle of friends. Through her then-boyfriend, Tom "Entropy" Kimzey, she became interested in playing Quake competitively. Case joined Kimzey's team, Impulse 9, and began competing under the name KillCreek. This alias was taken from the Lawrence, Kansas band Kill Creek, who had a member Case was friends with. Impulse 9 competed in the Quake competitive league Clanring, and won the T1 championship event in 1996.

After a few months of competing and making a name for herself, Case traveled to Dallas to meet some of the developers of her favorite first-person-shooter computer games. During her trip, she got the chance to play a Quake deathmatch against the game's designer, John Romero, but was beaten by him in a close game. After Romero put up a web page jokingly insulting her skill at the game, Case publicly demanded a rematch with him. While Case initially struggled in the best-of-three rematch, she rallied back to win the first round 25–19, and went on to ultimately defeat Romero. As punishment, Romero agreed to set up a web page praising Case.

Case was twenty years old at the time she won the rematch in 1997, and beating one of the co-creators of Quake at his own game brought her a lot of publicity. She gained a sponsor in computer mouse manufacturer SpaceTec IMC that year, and her victory against Romero received coverage in Rolling Stone. Angel Munoz, the founder of the Cyberathlete Professional League (CPL), convinced Case to join his league in July 1997, becoming its first signed professional gamer. She eventually became one of the league's original founders. Case competed in the first all-female Quake tournament that year, coming in second behind Kornelia Takacs. With the stability of sponsors and a $1000 monthly stipend from the CPL, Case decided to drop out of university and move to Dallas in the middle of 1997; she said that while she had a passion for political science, she "was not excited about the day-to-day aspects of politics or practicing law."

=== Transition to game design ===
While playing professionally, Case began looking at game design as a potential career, stating, "I love games, and I love competition—but having no choice but to play the same game day-in and day-out with all sorts of pressure attached just didn't suit my nature." According to Case, she did freelance game design work from her Dallas home for two years after university, using free design tools that she downloaded. One of the first game levels she designed was for Sin Mission Pack: Wages of Sin (1999). Setting up a small studio called Primitive Earthling Games, she and some friends created a Quake II add-on called Vengeance and submitted it to WizardWorks. However, it never became available for purchase due to publishing delays. Between 1998 and 2000, Case authored three strategy guide books for Prima Games: Jazz Jackrabbit 2 (1998), Buck Bumble (1998), and Daikatana (2000). She also contributed to their Quake II strategy guide.

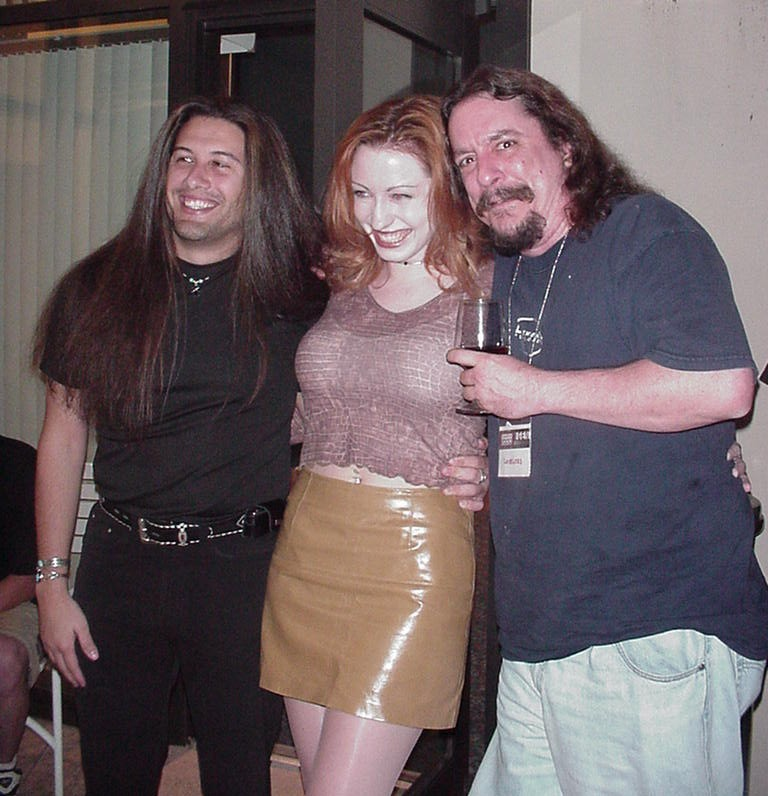
Case with John Romero (left) and Richard Gray (right) at QuakeCon 2000

Case was hired at Ion Storm in the summer of 1997 as a video game tester. After numerous members of the Daikatana development team left during the game's troubled production, Case accepted Romero's job offer to become a level designer in November 1998. Case helped design levels for Daikatana and Anachronox (2001). It was during this time period that Case began to date Romero. According to David Kushner's Masters of Doom, it was at this point when Case "radically reinvented herself" by losing weight, bleaching her hair, and undergoing breast augmentation surgery. Case received further press coverage, appearing on the March 2000 cover of PC Accelerator, and being featured as one of the "Next Game Gods" in the November 2000 issue of PC Gamer. She was approached by Playboy to appear in a nude pictorial, based on an interview she did in the Los Angeles Times. The pictorial was released online in May 2000. When asked about how she changed after moving to Dallas and making video games a career, Case responded:

Making the leap to games helped me to realize that the only way to be truly happy is to live by your own rules, not limited by outside expectations. I love my job, found a wonderful boyfriend and truly found myself through games.

Case was still involved in the Cyberathlete Professional League in some capacity. She eventually transitioned into being CPL's "Master of Ceremonies", and in 1999, Case joined the CPL's board of directors.

Case left Ion Storm in January 2001 to follow Romero to his new company, Monkeystone Games, which was founded in August 2001. Monkeystone was a mobile game development company formed from Romero's interest in mobile games, sparked by him wanting to move away from the lengthy development cycles of big-budget computer games. Case worked as a producer for Monkeystone's first game, Hyperspace Delivery Boy!, and also created the music and sound effects. She also was credited on titles like Monkeystone's Red Faction port for the N-Gage. After leaving Monkeystone Games, Case became a senior project manager for Warner Bros. Online's mobile group.

=== Sales and business development roles ===
According to Case, she decided at this point to slowly transition out of working in the game development industry, stating in an interview:

There was a ton of harassment and hate and sexism and abuse. People would send me hate email all the time. ... The benefit of connecting with people was so drowned out by how bad it felt to be in the spotlight.

Case recalled receiving the opportunity to leave game development when one of her contacts approached her about a potential junior sales position at his workplace. After leaving Warner Bros., Case was employed at Tira Wireless in sales and business development. Afterwards, she held a position with Spleak Media Network, where she was a director of product management.

In September 2008, she was vice president of business development and sales for fatfoogoo, an online commerce company. Case also served as Senior Director of Business Development at Live Gamer, and joined PlaySpan in 2010 as vice president of sales. PlaySpan was acquired by Visa in 2011.

On March 1, 2010, NewWorld, the former parent company of the CPL, announced that it had signed a two-year agreement with Stevie Case for the production of a new podcast show called Stevie FTW. According to the website's RSS feed, the last podcast was uploaded on March 11, 2011, and the last social media update was on the same date.

In 2014, she began working as the vice president of growth at San Francisco-based startup Layer. In 2016, she joined Twilio as an account executive and was promoted to vice president of sales over the years. In 2022, Case became the chief revenue officer (CRO) at software security and compliance company Vanta. She is also listed as a participant in SheEO, a nonprofit supporting the funding of female entrepreneurs, as well as the female investor group 37 Angels.

== Personal life ==
Case dated Quake player Tom "Entropy" Kimzey, who was also a University of Kansas student and a member of Impulse 9. They were involved romantically until the spring of 1997. Case had also dated game developer Tom Mustaine.

Soon after defeating John Romero in a Quake deathmatch, she and Romero started dating. Case and Romero moved in together in 1999, but their relationship ended in May 2003.

Case went on to marry a director of product development at THQ, and had a child with him. In a 2016 interview, Case stated that she had been a single parent with full custody of her child for eight years.

== Works ==
Year	Company	Title	Role/Position
1998	N/A (freelance)	SiN	Special Thanks
1999	Ritual Entertainment / 2015	Sin Mission Pack: Wages of Sin	Additional Level Design
2000	Ion Storm	Daikatana	Level Designer
2001	Ion Storm	Anachronox	Additional Level Design Cleanup
2001	Monkeystone Games	Hyperspace Delivery Boy!	Producer, Music and SFX
2003	Monkeystone Games	Red Faction	Creative Commando
