= Shawn Green (game designer) =

American video game designer

Shawn C. Green is an American video game developer who is best known for his work in the Doom and Hexen series for id Software and for Raven Software. He also worked on Daikatana and Anachronox as a programmer for Ion Storm in Dallas, Texas. He has also worked for Gearbox Software making Halo: Combat Evolved, as well as co-founding Escalation Studios.
