= Hyperspace Delivery Boy! =

2001 video game

- Developer(s): Monkeystone Games
- Publisher(s): Monkeystone Games; Linux Game Publishing
- Designer(s): Tom Hall
- Programmer(s): John Romero
- Composer(s): Stevie Case
- Platform(s): Pocket PC, Windows, Linux
- Release: December 23, 2001
- Genre(s): Puzzle, action
- Mode(s): Single-player

Hyperspace Delivery Boy! is a puzzle action game released for the Pocket PC on December 23, 2001. It was ported to Microsoft Windows and Linux. The game was the first title released Monkeystone Games, a small developer formed by id Software and Ion Storm founders John Romero and Tom Hall, and Romero's then-girlfriend Stevie Case. Much of the gameplay involves solving Sokoban-like puzzles.

== Plot ==
Gameplay (Linux)

Hyperspace Delivery Boy! follows the story of Guy Carrington, a courier in training. Guy is sent by Sergeant Filibuster on several dangerous missions in four locations. During the course of the game, Guy discovers a secret organization known as "THEM".

== Reviews ==
Reception

Review scores
Publication	Score
GameSpot	7/10
PC Games (DE)	61%

Hyperspace Delivery Boy! received average reviews from critics. Marc Saltzman of PC Gamer described the game as a "fun diversion" with "challenging puzzles", but found the game repetitive and featured "sophomoric dialogue" and "embarrassingly cheesy voice acting". Ron Dulin of GameSpot found the game to be fun, highlighting the challenge of the puzzle gameplay and "personality" of the game's humor, but faulted the limited story and "minimal" sound effects and music.
