= HAWC =

HAWC may refer to:

- High Altitude Water Cherenkov Experiment, a gamma-ray observatory in Mexico
- HAWC, a far-infrared telescope aboard NASA's SOFIA project
- Wacca Airport, Ethiopia, ICAO code HAWC
- Hypersonic Air-breathing Weapon Concept, a hypersonic weapon project
- Heavy Armored Weapon Chassis, a combat vehicle in the 1997 video game G-Nome
