= Cartoon Network: Block Party =

2004 video game

- North American box art
- Developers: Monkeystone Games; One Man Band LLC
- Publisher: Majesco
- Platform: Game Boy Advance
- Release: NA: August 3, 2004; PAL: September 15, 2004
- Genre: Party
- Modes: Single-player, multiplayer

Cartoon Network: Block Party is a 2004 arcade-style party game released for Game Boy Advance, developed by American studios Monkeystone Games and One Man Band LLC, and published by Majesco. It features characters from Cartoon Network original animated series such as Johnny Bravo, Ed, Edd n Eddy, Courage the Cowardly Dog, and Cow and Chicken. Critical reception was mostly negative.

== Background ==
Cartoon Network: Block Party was announced by Majesco on April 15, 2003. Upon its announcement, Vice President of Marketing for Majesco Ken Gold stated, "Cartoon Network Block Party complements our upcoming release of Cartoon Network Speedway and is a strong addition to Majesco's line up of quality licensed titles for the Game Boy Advance audience."

The game was released in the United States on August 5, 2004, and in Europe and Oceania on September 15, 2004. In retail, the game was frequently bundled with Cartoon Network Speedway.

== Gameplay ==
The gameplay is similar to Nintendo's Mario Party video game series. Players can experience places from Cartoon Network shows in a board game style. They can also play up to 30 mini-games based on the Cartoon Network shows. Players can choose any of the Cartoon Network characters they like.

== Plot ==
First, Cow and Chicken have gone to a farm, and after eating too many potatoes, their parents suggest that they have some protein. Cow and Chicken both want their favorite protein food: pork butts. In this board the player has to get four pork butts before returning to the start and winning.

Second, in the Ed, Edd n Eddy world, Eddy wants to win a skateboarding competition. Double-D doubts Eddy has a chance. The player must collect three trophies and 50 dollars before returning to the start and winning.

Then, in the world of Johnny Bravo, Johnny is trying his luck with the ladies, when Carl arrives. It turns out he has a date, and Johnny wants to help him prepare. The player must collect a pie, hair goo, a corn dog, a black shirt, and at least 50 dollars before returning to the start and winning.

Last, in Courage's world, Eustace and Muriel are trapped in the mansion of the evil Katz. Courage is in the mansion and is attempting to save them. The player must collect three spiders and 75 cobwebs before returning to the start and winning.
