= Daikatana =

2000 video game

- Developer: Ion Storm
- Publishers: Eidos Interactive; Kemco (N64)
- Producer: Kelly Hoerner
- Designer: John Romero
- Programmer: Shawn C. Green
- Artists: Jeremiah O'Flaherty; Eric Smith
- Writer: Jorge Gonzalez
- Composers: Al Chaney; Will Loconto; Will Nevins; Stan Neuvo; Robert Owen
- Engine: Quake II engine
- Platforms: Nintendo 64; Windows
- Release: Nintendo 64: JP: April 7, 2000; UK: May 5, 2000; NA: August 1, 2000; Windows: NA: May 23, 2000; UK: June 9, 2000; JP: June 30, 2000; AU: July 12, 2000
- Genre: First-person shooter
- Modes: Single-player, multiplayer

John Romero's Daikatana, better known as simply Daikatana, is a 2000 first-person shooter action role-playing game developed by Ion Storm and published by Eidos Interactive for Windows. A port to the Nintendo 64 was released the same year by Kemco. Players control a swordsmaster who travels through various time periods using the eponymous Daikatana, a powerful sword tied to the fate of the world.

Daikatana was directed by Ion Storm co-founder John Romero, a co-developer of the influential first-person shooters Wolfenstein 3D (1992), Doom (1993), and Quake (1996). Announced in 1997 as Romero's first game after leaving id Software, it underwent a troubled development that saw a change in its engine, release date delays, and the departure of several staff members. The protracted development, combined with promotion that focused on Romero's involvement over the game itself, resulted in negative publicity for Daikatana prior to its release.

Released in May 2000, Daikatana received generally negative reviews for its outdated graphics, gameplay, repetitive sound effects, and poor artificial intelligence. It also sold only 40,351 copies, becoming one of the biggest major commercial failures of the video game industry. Due to the negative response, a separate version for the Game Boy Color did not receive a North American release; it was released in Europe and Japan to a more positive reception.

== Gameplay ==
Gameplay of Daikatana

Daikatana is composed of 24 levels (18 in the console version) divided into four episodes, with a varying number of levels per episode. Each episode represents a different location and time period: Japan in 2455 AD, ancient Greece in 1200 BC, the Dark Ages in Norway in 560 AD, and near-future San Francisco in 2030 AD.

One element that Daikatana stressed was the important role of Hiro Miyamoto's two sidekicks, Mikiko Ebihara and Superfly Johnson. The death of either sidekick resulted in failing the level, and their assistance was required to complete certain puzzles. Due to poor AI implementation, the sidekicks, who were one of the game's selling points, became a focus of criticism. Tabs displaying the status of each sidekick are displayed on either side of the player's screen. When a sidekick moves too far away from the player their tab disappears. The player is also able to give the sidekicks commands such as Stay and Follow.

As the player progresses through the game they are able to level various attributes to improve their skills. These attributes are Power, Attack, Speed, Acro and Vitality.

Daikatana has a multiplayer mode which consists of two types of gameplay. Players can fight in a deathmatch style mode or race to collect treasure. In-game text chat is available in multiplayer mode

== Plot ==
In feudal Japan, two rival clans, Ebihara and Mishima, are at war. Mishima goes to swordmaster Usagi Miyamoto to craft a weapon to end the conflict: the Daikatana. However, Usagi realizes Mishima's dark desires and gives the Daikatana to Ebihara; Inshiro Ebihara throws the sword into a volcano at the end of the war.

In 2455 AD, swordmaster Hiro Miyamoto is visited by a man named Dr. Toshiro Ebihara, a descendant of Inshiro who is suffering from a plague and about to die. Toshiro tells Hiro that Kage Mishima, the ruler of the planet, took over the world by stealing the Daikatana and using it to alter history. In 2030, he stole the cure to a viral plague and uses the cure to control the world's population. Mikiko Ebihara (Toshiro's daughter) has been captured while trying to steal back the Daikatana, and Hiro must rescue her and fix history.

Hiro storms Mishima's headquarters where he rescues Mikiko as well as Superfly Johnson (Mishima's head of security) who rebelled when he grew sick of Mishima's brutal totalitarian practices. Mikiko and Superfly join Hiro in his quest and steal the Daikatana. Mishima encounters the trio as they steal the sword, wielding a second Daikatana. Mishima sends the trio back in time to Ancient Greece. Hiro and Mikiko defeat Medusa, recharging the Daikatana as it absorbs Medusa's power. The three time jump once more, only to encounter Mishima again and be sent through time to the Dark Ages, stranded as the Daikatana has run out of energy.

The group finds a sorcerer named Musilde who offers to recharge the Daikatana if Hiro, Superfly, and Mikiko can save his village from the black plague. To do this, the group must defeat the necromancer Nharre, reassemble a holy sword called the Purifier, and use it to restore King Gharroth's sanity so that he may use the sword to end the plague. When King Gharroth recharges the Daikatana, Hiro and his allies time jump again to the year 2030. San Francisco has fallen to gangs and martial law has been declared by the military and Mishima.

The trio fights their way through a naval base where the Mishima is working on weapons. The ghost of Usagi enters Hiro's body and gives him full control over the Daikatana. With Usagi's knowledge and sword skills, Hiro slays Mishima. One of the Daikatana disappears, as its timeline no longer exists.

Mikiko steals the remaining Daikatana and kills Superfly, revealing that the feudal Ebihara clan was just as evil as the Mishima clan. She announces her intentions to use the Daikatana to restore the honor of her ancient clan and take over the world. Hiro defeats and kills Mikiko, then uses the Daikatana to fix history once and for all. The altered timeline concludes: the Daikatana is never found in 2455, the viral plague is cured in 2030, the Mishima clan never takes over the world, and Hiro exiles himself to a forgotten corner of the space-time continuum, safeguarding the Daikatana to ensure that it never falls into evil hands.

== Development ==
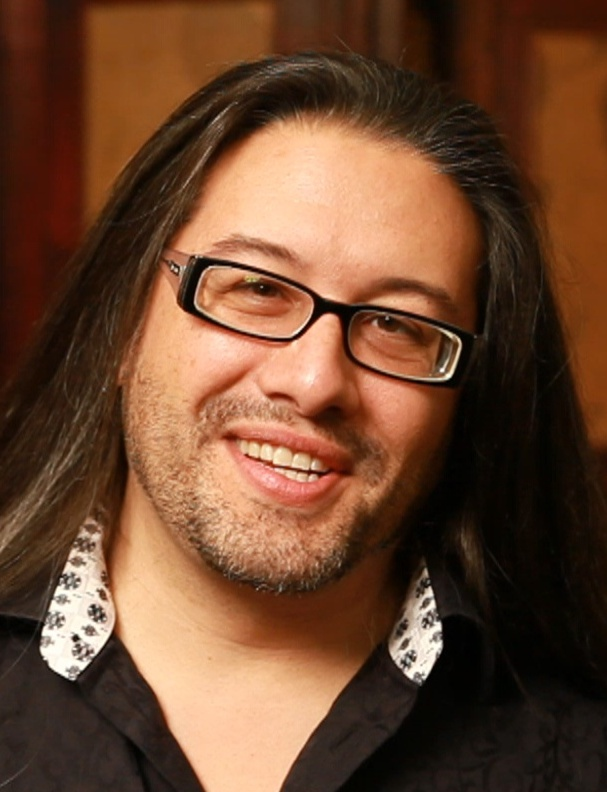
Ion Storm co-founder and Daikatana creator John Romero

Daikatana was conceptualized by John Romero, an influential developer whose résumé included founding titles in the first-person shooter genre (Wolfenstein 3D, Doom, Quake) when he worked at id Software. The game was developed by Ion Storm, a company founded by Romero, Tom Hall, Bob Wright, Mike Wilson, Todd Porter, and Jerry O'Flaherty. Wilson, the CEO, was removed in November 1997, after using $30,000 in company funds to buy a BMW. Wright was removed by Porter and O'Flaherty in May 1998. Over 50 Ion Storm employees left after Wright's removal. Porter and O'Flaherty were fired in 1999, with rumors being that Romero was angry at Porter's interference in Daikatana.

The aim was for the company to create games that catered to their creative tastes without excessive publisher interference, which had constrained both Romero and Hall too much in the past. Daikatana was part of an initial three-game contract made between Ion Storm and expanding publisher Eidos Interactive; and the third title to be conceived at Ion Storm after Anachronox and what would become Dominion: Storm Over Gift 3. Ion Storm received a $13 million advance from Eidos. The game had a rumored budget of $30 million.

Two main influences for Daikatana were Chrono Trigger and The Legend of Zelda: Ocarina of Time, of which Romero was a fan. He implemented the sidekick feature from the former and the mighty sword from the latter. For the sidekicks, Romero wanted Mikiko and Superfly to do everything the player does in the game. Using 2001's Tom Clancy's Ghost Recon as another reference, he wanted the sidekicks to do more than what the AI squads could do, like jumping, running, fighting and solving puzzles (the AI squads are locked to the ground and cannot jump). Romero later regretted this decision, as he found out that programming this feature was very difficult because the sidekicks ended up being buggy and unresponsive.

In 1997, Romero compared Quake's seven weapons and 10 monsters across the game with 150 polygons to Daikatana's 35 weapons and 16 monsters per episode with 500 polygons. John Carmack stated that a game of that size could not be completed by its December release date. Romero's design document for the game was 400 pages long. Kee Kimbrell, the co-creator of DWANGO, was the lead programmer.

The core concept was to do something different with shooter mechanics several times within the same game. Romero created the basic storyline, and named its protagonist Hiro Miyamoto in honour of Japanese game designer Shigeru Miyamoto. The title is written in Japanese kanji, translating roughly to "big sword". The name comes from an item in a Dungeons & Dragons campaign played by the original members of id Software, which Romero co-founded. During this early period, the team consisted of fifteen people. The music was composed by a team which included Will Loconto. Christian Divine created the character Superfly Johnson, originally named Super Williams in honor of Super Fly and Jim Kelly's character from Enter the Dragon. He was originally of French descent with "his name taken from the few cultural documents left in the apocalyptic future" and his "character arc would be finding out his real identity at the end".

The game was built using the original Quake engine and had a planned release date of December 1997. Romero saw the Quake II demo at E3 1997 and decided to switch to the Quake II engine, but did not receive it until February 1998. A version of Daikatana on the Quake engine was shown at that year's E3 alongside Tomb Raider II "to a muted reception" according to Edge. It was listed at 50% completed by August 1997. This change resulted in many delays when finalizing the engine. The problems with programming the new engine contributed to the game being delayed from its projected 1998 release date. Romero stated prior to release that he would have chosen the Quake II engine to develop the game from the start if given the chance. Romero later ascribed some problems triggered in using the technology as being due to the rivalry manufactured by the company's marketing between them and id Software. Due to the delays, development of the game ran parallel to Anachronox, Dominion: Storm Over Gift 3, and eventually Deus Ex. Both Quake II and Quake III Arena came out before Daikatana.

Something that further impacted production was the departure of around twenty staff members from the team, who either left Ion Storm or transferred to the Austin studio. In 1998, lead artist Bryan Pritchard left the company and was replaced by Eric Smith. According to Divine, the growing negative press surrounding the company had a further detrimental effect on development. Some of the backlash eventually led to his own departure for Ion Storm's Austin studio to work on Deus Ex. Almost the entire team working on Daikatana left to join Gathering of Developers by 1999. The most notorious incident was the public resignation of nine core team members at once, something Romero understood given the low team morale but felt as a betrayal of trust. The departures led to the hiring of Stevie Case as level designer and Chris Perna to polish and add to character models. 17 people, one-fifth of Ion Storm's employees, left in early 1999, and Corrinne Yu, director of technology, left for 3D Realms. Only two staff members remained on the game for the entirety of its production.

Problems reached the point that Eidos publishing director John Kavanagh was sent down to sort out problems surrounding its production. In a later interview, Romero admitted there were many faults with the game at release, blaming the development culture and management clashes at Ion Storm, in addition to staff departures causing much of the work to be scrapped and begun over again. Divine attributed the problems to a combination of overly carefree atmosphere, and corporate struggles about company ownership interfering with game production. In a 1999 interview, Romero attributed the slowing of development during that period to the staff departures, but said that most of the level design and the entire score had been completed before that. Wired listed the game 5th on the list of vaporware for 1999. A sequel, using the Unreal Engine 1, was considered.

== Promotion and release ==
The controversial advertisement for Daikatana

Daikatana was revealed in 1997, forming part of the opening publicity for Ion Storm. In subsequent years, the press material focused almost entirely on pushing the company name and its lead developers, something later regretted by several of its staff. This was particularly true of Romero. This consequently drew Romero away from production, leading to further difficulties. Public, journalistic and commercial confidence in the project was weakened by the repeated delays to its release date. The situation was worsened when the Dallas Observer printed a story about the internal struggles of the Austin office, which cited both undercover interviews and leaked emails. The article prompted widespread publicity surrounding the staff departures and the company's financial status. Romero responded by calling the claims of the article "both biased and inaccurate". Later, Romero felt that their marketing's attempts to push the game only made Ion Storm and its core members come off as egotistical.

Daikatana was advertised with a 1997 print ad with the phrase "John Romero's about to make you his bitch", which became notorious. According to Mike Wilson, the ad was created by the same artist who designed the game's box art, under order of their chosen advertising agency. Both Wilson and Romero thought it was funny and approved it. Romero had second thoughts soon after but was persuaded by Wilson to let it pass. Speaking ten years later, Romero said he went along with it as he had a reputation for similar crass phrases. He said that the reactions to the poster tarnished the game's image long before release and continued to affect his public image and career. In a 2008 blog post, Romero attributed the marketing tactic to Wilson, prompting a hostile exchange of public messages between the two. Romero told Retro Gamer that Sasha Shor designed the game's packaging and the ad.

Daikatana was demoed at the 1999 Electronic Entertainment Expo. The demo ran at a very low 12 frames per second, which further damaged the game's public image. Staff member Jake Hughes remembered that Romero wanted changes made which crippled the demo tech and caused the issues, while Romero states that he had already departed for E3 and the upper management insisted on the changes when he was gone. On April 21, 2000, Daikatana was completed and reached gold status. A tie-in comic book was drawn by Marc Silvestri and released by Top Cow for Prima Games' Daikatana: Prima's Official Strategy Guide. The Nintendo 64 version was first released as a Blockbuster rental exclusive by Kemco in August 2000. It was later released for retail on November 26, 2000.

Daikatana received a 44 megabyte patch and its final patch, version 1.2, was released on September 29, 2000. Following the release of Daikatana and Anachronox, Ion Storm Austin decided to close the Dallas branch office in July 2001. In the absence of any further official support after this closure, Romero gave the source code to community members, allowing them to develop additional platform ports (most notably Linux, macOS and other Unix-like systems) and bug fixes.

== Reception ==
=== Sales ===
Ion Storm's 1996 business plan projected that Daikatana would sell around 175,000 copies. Before Daikatana's release, reports indicated that Ion Storm forecast sales of 2.5 million units, a number that GameDaily called necessary for the game "to become profitable". According to American market research company PC Data, a week after its release, the game ranked number ten on their charts from the week of May 28 to June 3. The computer version of Daikatana sold 8,190 copies in the United States by July 21, which drew revenues of $271,982. Mark Asher of CNET Gamecenter called this performance "a disaster". According to PC Data, the game's domestic sales reached 40,351 units through September 2000.

=== Reviews ===
Reception

Aggregate score
Aggregator	Score	
Aggregator	N64	PC
GameRankings	42%	54%

Review scores
Publication	Score	
Publication	N64	PC
Computer Gaming World	N/A	1.5/5
Edge	N/A	4/10
Electronic Gaming Monthly	3.87/10	N/A
Eurogamer	N/A	5/10
GameFan	N/A	77%
GamePro	N/A	3/5
GameRevolution	N/A	C
GameSpot	3.7/10	4.6/10
GameSpy	N/A	74%
GameZone	N/A	7/10
Génération 4	N/A	2/6
Hyper	80/100	60/100
IGN	4/10	5.8/10
Joystick	N/A	40/100
MeriStation	4.7/10	N/A
Next Generation	N/A	2/5
Nintendo Power	5.6/10	N/A
PC Gamer (US)	N/A	53%
PC PowerPlay	N/A	64/100
Super Game Power	7.3/10	N/A

Jeff Lundrigan reviewed the PC version of the game for Next Generation, rating it two stars out of five, and stated that "This isn't the worst game you'll ever play, but there's precious little fun either. Two years out of its time, Daikatana is notable mostly for its mediocrity." Entertainment Weekly gave it a "D", calling the game a "disaster" on the scale of the box-office bomb Waterworld. PC Zone's review criticized the first episode as the worst part of the game and that "Romero's reputation is based on the fact that he is the daddy of game design. Daikatana must be his illegitimate child". The second level in Greece was praised by Robert Coffey in Computer Gaming World as the game's best level.

Computer Gaming World named it the worst game of 2000. It was listed as the worst game of the year by Maximum PC's technical editor Will Smith and associate editor Geoff Visgilio.

The Nintendo 64 version received "unfavorable" reviews, according to the review aggregation website GameRankings. Nintendo Power's gave the Nintendo 64 version a score of 5.6 out of 10 stating that Doom on the Super Nintendo Entertainment System was superior. David Toole's review in GameSpot criticized the low amount of enemies in this version and the simplistic music, but praised the smooth in-game framerate despite the cutscene framerate being low.

=== Retrospective analysis ===
Since its release, the game has been called one of the worst video games of all time. GameTrailers ranked the game as the second-biggest gaming disappointment of the 2000s, citing the game's terrible AI, pushed-back release dates, controversial magazine ad, and internal drama as "the embodiment of game's industry hubris."

The game critic Ben "Yahtzee" Croshaw, on a retrospective episode of Zero Punctuation, also citing the development delays and the magazine ad, named Daikatana "one of the most notorious disappointments in the entire history of first-person shooters", comparing the game to Duke Nukem Forever.

In 2010, Romero said that despite its shaky development and being considered one of the worst games of all time, Daikatana was "more fun to make than Quake" due to the lack of creative interference.

==== Unofficial patch ====
Daikatana v1.3
- Developers: Frank Sapone and others
- Release: June 2, 2014; 12 years ago
- Stable release: 08-17-2023 / August 17, 2023; 3 years ago
- Engine: Quake II engine
- Platform: Microsoft Windows, macOS, Linux, FreeBSD
- Type: Unofficial patch
- Website: github.com/maraakate/daikatana/

Daikatana v1.3 (also referred to as the "1.3 patch") is an unofficial patch project started by modder and IT professional Frank Sapone and other modders.

Upon request, Romero sent the complete source code for version 1.2 of the game to Sapone. However, the hard drive that was sent corrupted. After shelving it for five years, Sapone successfully compiled the source code. After this, Sapone enlisted the help of other modders to help work on the patch. Reportedly, by playing multiplayer matches of the game, it has helped Sapone find bugs and test the code's stability. In 2014, the first version of the patch was released. It is currently under active development.

The project aims to fix various issues the game was criticized for and make general improvements:

- Bug fixes
- Faster loading times with an option to disable the sound effect
- Graphical fidelity
- Improved AI for the sidekick characters (including the options to make them invincible on the easy difficulty, increased health on other modes, or to play without them)
- Fixed online multiplayer utilizing the QTracker service
- Support for widescreen (including 4K and 5K resolutions)
- HD textures
- Glowmaps
- Ability to play the game on macOS (including systems with Apple silicon chipsets), Linux, and FreeBSD

Jack Pooley of WhatCulture called it a "tectonic improvement" over the vanilla game. Matteo Lupetti of Eurogamer said, "Thanks to these modders, Daikatana is a totally playable game now." Speaking about the modders behind the project, Schnapple of Shacknews said, "they've delivered a version of the game that's improved the original considerably." Rashko Temelkovski of GloriousGaming.com said, "thanks to these people, Daikatana is actually much better than you might remember it." John Walker of Rock Paper Shotgun said, "while boosting it ... via the improbable existence of still-maintained Daikatana 1.3 fan project, nothing can fix what a leaden lump of clumsy unfun [Daikatana] truly is."

Romero has praised and endorsed the project on his Twitter account.

== Game Boy Color version ==
The Game Boy Color version of Daikatana was released in Europe and Japan; publisher Kemco decided against the North American release due to the poor reputation of the Daikatana brand. The Japanese version was also only made available as a download for the Nintendo Power peripheral. This version's gameplay differs greatly from the N64 and PC versions: at Romero's request, the title was adapted to the platform as a top-down dungeon crawler, in the style of early Zelda games such as the NES original and The Legend of Zelda: Link's Awakening. In 2004, Romero released the ROM images for the Game Boy Color game on his website, for use with emulators. Frank Provo for GameSpot gave the game a seven out of ten.

== Works cited ==
- Brown, Ken (1999). "Ion To Dump Two Founders". Computer Gaming World. No. 181. Ziff Davis.
- Coffey, Robert (1999). "Making Mayhem: The Blood, Sweat, and Tears of Blood, Guns, and Speed". Computer Gaming World. No. 181. Ziff Davis.
- Coffey, Robert (2000). "Yep...it stinks". Computer Gaming World. No. 193. Ziff Davis.
- Krantz, Michael (1997). "Beyond Doom and Quake". Time. Vol. 149, no. 25. Time Warner.
- Presley, Paul (1999). "Staff picks (and dirty tricks)". PC Zone. No. 141. Future plc.
- "An Audience With John Romero". Edge. No. 45. Future Publishing. 1997.
- "Daikatana". PC Zone. No. 91. Future plc. 2000.
- "Daikatana". Nintendo Power. No. 131. Nintendo. 2000.
- "Daikatana: The Damned". Edge. No. 120. Future Publishing. 2003.
- "Daikatana 2". PC Accelerator. No. 16. Future US. 1999.
- "Eye of the Storm". Hyper. No. 141. Nextmedia. 1997.
- "From Frags To Riches". Edge. No. 191. Future Publishing. 2008.
- "inside id". Edge. No. 73. Future Publishing. 1999.
- "ion storm". Edge. No. 70. Future Publishing. 1999.
- "Patch file size". Edge. No. 88. Future Publishing. 2000.
- "Q&A John Romero". Retro Gamer. No. 141. Future Publishing. 2015.
- "Romero's Vision". PC Gamer. No. 39. Future plc. 1997.
- "Staff picks (and dirty tricks)". Maximum PC. No. 141. Future US. 2000.

=== Bibliography ===
- Kushner, David (2003). Masters of Doom. Random House. ISBN 0-8129-7215-5.
