= G-Nome =

1997 video game

- Cover art with protagonist Joshua Gant and a Union Tactical Defense HAWC
- Developer: 7th Level
- Publishers: NA: 7th Level; EU: Bomico Entertainment Software
- Director: Bill Fahle
- Producers: Dan Donahue; Todd Porter
- Designers: Bill Fahle; Dan Donahue; Todd Porter
- Artists: Jerry O'Flaherty; Jay Lee
- Writer: Dan Donahue
- Composer: Chris Boardman
- Platform: Windows
- Release: NA: February 18, 1997; EU: 1997
- Genre: Mech simulation
- Modes: Single-player, multiplayer

G-Nome is a mech simulation video game developed by 7th Level. Publisher difficulties led to it having a protracted development cycle. Originally intended to be published by Merit for MS-DOS, it was released for Windows on February 18, 1997, as 7th Level's first 3D game. Reviews were unenthusiastic, as critics found that while the main selling point (that characters could leave their mechs and commandeer others) was innovative, the overall execution of the game was weak.

G-Nome was followed up by a real-time strategy spin-off called Dominion: Storm Over Gift 3, developed by 7th Level, but acquired and released by Ion Storm.

== Gameplay ==
A Union soldier entering a vehicle.

The entirety of G-Nome's gameplay is based around close-surface combat, by the means of direct foot movement or the occupancy of vehicles. The majority of the vehicles are mecha assault machines called "HAWCs", (Heavy Armored Weapons Chassis), that carry between two and four weapons, including laser pulse weapons, machine guns and missiles. Each race also has hovercraft and tanks. Certain vehicles may carry passengers. Equipped with low-energy laser rifles, foot combatants are generally disadvantaged to vehicle-occupying opponents, though non-lethal grenade launchers called GASHRs will eject the occupants of any vehicle or structure upon impact.

G-Nome features four alien factions: the Darken, the Union, the Mercs and the Scorp. Each of these races represent a certain environmental theme; the Darken are desert-themed, the Union-centered portion takes place in a volcanic land, the Mercs are snow and ice-themed and the Scorp are grassland-themed. All the races maintain similar naming conventions and strength orientation in regards to their vehicles and structures, with certain attributes of one vehicle having a relative advantage over the other. The one exception to this would be the Mercs, whose faction features an extra vehicle and all their vehicles do not feature auto-eject systems upon destruction, causing a guaranteed fatality, if not attended to.

== Story ==
The game takes place in the year 2225, A.D., on the contested planet Ruhelen. Humanity is space-faring, under a government called the Union Alliance, which is at odds with the alien Scorp species, as well as the Darkens and Mercs. The discovery of the mineral-rich Phygos star system has upset the tenuous ceasefire between the four races, threatening war. The player assumes the role of Sergeant Joshua Gant, a retired Union Intelligence Agency (UIA) operative who was on a mission ten years prior that resulted in the loss of his best friend, Ron Pearl. Gant is reenlisted by UIA director General Allance Wilkins for a covert mission, to euthanize a creature genetically engineered from human prisoners of war by the Scorp called the "G-Nome" and to destroy the laboratory where it is kept. Gant is assigned a team to assemble that includes his old friend and munitions expert in Darken territory, Sergeant Stephen Kylie, the UIA's most proficient geneticist on separate assignment in Merc territory, Doctor Victoria Thane - and an undisclosed final member of the team undercover in Scorp territory.

Gant begins his mission by traversing the Darken Republic and rendezvousing with Kylie. They cross Merc territory to meet Thane, who identifies specialized Merc technology housed in a facility called the Citadel atop Mesa Caracon, for neutralizing the G-Nome. After acquiring the technology, the team heads for the Scorp territory.

Gant and his team bypass the Scorp border and are introduced to the final member of the team, Major Jack Sheridan, who was responsible for the loss of Pearl. Sheridan leads the team to the laboratory, but betrays the mission by attempting to kill Gant, allowing for Kylie to be captured by the Scorp and taking the G-Nome for himself. The Scorp cooperate with the UIA, to prevent Sheridan from cloning the G-Nome at a genetic recombination laboratory located within the volcanic Shalten Frontier.

Gant's team destroys the laboratory, but Sheridan kills Kylie. Gant pursues and kills Sheridan. The G-Nome breaks out of the cargo bay of Sheridan's vehicle and attacks Gant, prompting him to tranquilize it. A barcode on the G-Nome's paw reveals that it is Pearl. Gant falsely reports the G-Nome dead and allows it to flee before the UIA forces arrive. The G-Nome is seen heading toward the sunset during the ending credits of the game.

The UIA rummage through the remains of Sheridan's laboratory, while Wilkins discretely retrieves a petri dish labelled "G-NOME: PEARL". The Scorp subsequently declares war on the Union Alliance, though both they and the Union deny Gant's mission. Wilkins unexpectedly resigns.

== Development ==
G-Nome made its first public appearance in the form of conceptual video footage shown at publisher Merit's booth at the Summer 1994 Consumer Electronics Show. Merit suffered from a number of financial setbacks, delaying the game, and the game's developer, Distant Thunder, was later acquired by 7th Level.

Producer Todd Porter commented on the advantages of switching the development environment to Windows 95: "It's a real time, 3D, texture-mapped, polygon game. We're getting benchmarks that are just incredible right now. We're already a Windows-based company, so working with DirectDraw and Direct Access was a no-brainer. We did the Direct Access in October and what we saw was an immediate increase in speed. Another great thing about it is that we can play in any resolution, 320x200 all the way to 1280x1024."

== Reception ==
Reception

Review scores
| Publication | Score |
|---|---|
| Computer Gaming World | 1/5 |
| GameSpot | 6.2/10 |
| Next Generation | 2/5 |
| PC PowerPlay | 80% |

A Next Generation critic hailed the ability to exit one's mech, wander around on foot, and take over other characters' mechs as a never-before-seen feature, and praised the mission designs for their combination of fun "blast-fests" with ingenuously conceived infiltration missions. He nonetheless concluded that "While it admittedly introduces some interesting new elements, G-Nome doesn't put much of a dent in the MechWarrior genre." Stephen Poole similarly remarked in GameSpot, "The good news is that G-NOME has several unique (and pretty cool) features that you won't find in any other mech game; the bad news is that muddy control, graphics glitches, and a sparse manual keep it from being the best it can be." Besides the ability to take over mechs, he was pleased with the high level of control over one's teammates, but found that control issues make even basic maneuvers unreasonably difficult. He particularly criticized the fact that when on foot, the player character fires in the direction he's running instead of the direction he's facing. His final assessment was that players who can master the frustrating controls would still find the game worthwhile for its gameplay innovations. Greg Fortune of Computer Gaming World was less forgiving: "Vehicle independence is a great concept, but it is so poorly implemented here that it detracts from the game rather than enhancing it." Like Poole, he ridiculed the inability to fire in alternate directions when on foot, and additionally criticized the cockpit display, omniscient radar, troublesome targeting, pixelation, weak enemy AI, and repetitive multiplayer combat.

G-Nome commercially "flopped", according to the Dallas Observer.
