= Vanta (company) =

American software company

- Type: Private
- Industry: Software as a service (SaaS)
- Founded: 2018; 8 years ago
- Founders: Christina Cacioppo, Erik Goldman
- Headquarters: San Francisco, California, US
- Area served: Worldwide
- Number of employees: 1,000+ (2026)
- Website: www.vanta.com

Vanta is an American software company that provides a platform for automating information security monitoring and compliance management. Its software is intended to facilitate governance, risk, and compliance (GRC) processes by automating tasks that would otherwise be performed manually. Founded in 2018 during a period of high-profile data breaches in the technology industry, Vanta emerged from the Y Combinator startup accelerator program.

In its early years, the company grew with minimal outside investment and operated under a lean business model. Since 2021, it has completed several funding rounds, reaching unicorn status in 2022. In 2023, Vanta introduced artificial intelligence (AI) into its product offerings. In its most recent funding round in 2025, the company was valued at US$4.15 billion.

== History ==
=== Origins and launch ===
Vanta was founded in 2018 by Christina Cacioppo and Erik Goldman, both former employees of Dropbox. (Note: Some sources incorrectly cite 2017 as Vanta's founding year. The company was founded in 2018, following its participation in Y Combinator's startup accelerator program that winter.) Cacioppo began her career at Dropbox in 2014 as one of their founding product managers in a team building Dropbox Paper. Goldman worked at Dropbox as a software engineer. Cacioppo conceived the idea for the company while at Dropbox, where she worked on security compliance contracts during the development of Dropbox Paper. In interviews, she described the compliance process as time-consuming and tedious, which informed her view that similar challenges were faced by other companies.

Cacioppo left Dropbox in 2016 and spent the following year studying the market and interviewing information security professionals. Through these interviews, they identified a need for standardized, automated approaches to compliance and security monitoring. In the winter of 2018, they participated in Y Combinator's startup accelerator program and raised US$3 million in seed funding to launch Vanta.

The company was established amid a period of heightened scrutiny following several high-profile data breaches at several technology companies. Vanta's initial project offerings were made to help companies attain System and Organization Controls (SOC 2) compliance, a framework used to evaluate an organization's trustworthiness in handling customer data. Notion was among Vanta's early customers and adopted its compliance and security monitoring products.

In its early years under Cacioppo's leadership, Vanta operated with limited external investment and a lean organizational structure, prioritizing speed to market while controlling expenditures. Its first investments consisted of US$500,000 from Y Combinator and US$3 million in seed funding. Vanta initially developed its product through projects with individual companies, acting more as a consultant, before standardizing the product to serve a broader customer base. During its first two years, the company maintained minimal formal structure, holding no executive or staff meetings, relying on manually written customer emails rather than an automated system, and keeping costs low through practical measures.

Vanta grew through sales, reaching 600 customers without maintaining a company website. To facilitate its product feedback loop, Vanta hired engineers with customer-facing responsibilities. In 2019, Vanta became a sponsor of This Week in Startups, a technology podcast hosted by investor Jason Calacanis. Through the sponsorship, Vanta engaged with other companies, and the podcast served as a key marketing channel for the company. Vanta had five employees at the beginning of 2019 and nearly 45 by 2020. The company was profitable from 2019 through 2021.

=== Fundraising and growth ===
In May 2021, Vanta announced a US$50 million Series A funding round led by Sequoia Capital, with participation from existing Y Combinator investors. Sequoia investors noted that part of their interest in investing in Vanta stemmed from the fact that nearly two dozen of their portfolio companies were using Vanta's products. Cacioppo used these companies as references to demonstrate Vanta's market adoption to Sequoia. The company stated that the funding would support product development, expansion of its sales and marketing team, and the opening of a corporate office in New York City. Vanta reported in US$10 million in annual recurring revenue (ARR), a fivefold increase from the previous year.

In June 2022, Vanta announced a US$110 million Series B funding round led by Craft Ventures. Existing investors, including Sequoia Capital and Y Combinator, also invested in the round. The funding helped Vanta achieve unicorn status with a US$1.6 billion valuation. Investors attributed Vanta's growth to several factors, including its lean operational structure and Cacioppo's direct involvement in product development and customer-facing activities. In October 2022, Vanta announced an additional US$40 million raised as part of its Series B funding round, which had been led in June, bringing its total capital raised to US$203 million. The round included participation from cybersecurity company CrowdStrike and several individual investors. In late 2022, Vanta opened its first European corporate office in Ireland to expand its presence in the region in response to Europe's regulatory environment.

In January 2023, Vanta acquired TrustPage, a company based in Royal Oak, Michigan, whose product automated security reviews between vendors and customers. The financial terms of the deal were not disclosed. In May 2023, Vanta was included on CNBC’s Disruptor 50 list, which recognizes companies deemed innovative and competitive. In July 2024, Sequoia led a US$150 million Series C funding round in Vanta, bringing the company's valuation to approximately US$2.45 billion. The round also included investments from Craft Ventures and Y Combinator, two large U.S. banks—Goldman Sachs and JPMorgan Chase—and the venture arms of technology companies including CrowdStrike, Atlassian, HubSpot, and Workday. The funding was intended to support the company's artificial intelligence (AI) product roadmap, retire legacy compliance products, and expand its market presence in the UK and Australia.

In June 2025, Vanta was named a leader in an International Data Corporation (IDC) MarketScape report evaluating GRC software vendors. The following month, Vanta closed a US$150 million Series D funding round at a valuation of US$4.15 billion, a 69 percent increase from the previous year. The fundraising was led by Wellington Management and previous investors Sequoia, Goldman Sachs, JPMorgan Chase, and Craft Ventures. With this round, the company had raised a total of US$504 million since 2021. Cacioppo declined to comment on the company's ARR but confirmed that the average transaction size and growth rate had increased. She also stated that none of the US$150 million raised in the previous year had been used.

The company also confirmed the acquisition of Riskey, an Israeli company that developed an AI-based risk monitoring and incident categorization product, for an undisclosed amount. Cacioppo stated that Vanta was open to acquiring companies with adjacent product offerings to further expand its product suite, and that the funding could be used for additional acquisitions as the company saw fit. Vanta also said the funds would support the expansion of its AI offerings and noted that it had opened a corporate office in London and a data center in Australia within the past year.

In April 2026, Vanta reported 1,000 employees, over 16,000 customers, and $300 million in ARR, a threefold increase over the previous two years. The company attributed its growth to increased enterprise adoption of AI and growing demand for oversight of shadow IT.

== Corporate affairs ==
Vanta is headquartered in San Francisco, California, United States. The company operates with a primarily remote workforce and maintains offices to support hybrid work in the United States, the United Kingdom, Ireland, and Australia. Vanta also hosts an annual conference, VantaCon. Their chief executive officer (CEO) is Christina Cacioppo.

The company adopted a purple llama as its mascot, citing the animal's protective instincts and its use as a guard animal capable of emitting an alarm-like sound when detecting predators. In an interview, Cacioppo said the choice was intended to reflect Vanta's focus on security without being overly literal. The company selected the color purple, stating that it was intended to convey seriousness and calm. Vanta's llama mascot is named Ilma, a name described as loosely translating to "resolute protector" in German. The name "Vanta" is derived from the word "advantage".

== Products and services ==
=== Overview ===
Vanta is an agentic trust platform that provides automated compliance and continuous governance, risk, and compliance (GRC) management. The product is used to manage security and compliance requirements through automation and reduce manual processes.

In its early years, the company focused on helping customers achieve compliance with specific security certifications. Over time, the product expanded to support broader GRC and trust management use cases, including risk management, identity and access management, trust centers, and security questionnaire automation. In addition to its software products, Vanta provides services through an in-house team and external implementation partners, including technical support, security consulting, and assistance with client onboarding and product use.

Vanta's integrates with over 400 software apps and includes a native AI agent. It also has a dashboard where users can monitor security and compliance across their existing technology stack, surface metrics and insights, and generate reports. The platform includes a library of policies and frameworks and supports the use of data ingested from third-party sources. Vanta supports compliance certification across a range of industry standards, including SOC 2, ISO 42001, ISO 27001, Health Insurance Portability and Accountability Act (HIPAA), General Data Protection Regulation (GDPR) and FedRAMP.

=== Features ===
One of its product features, Access Review, manages and evaluates user access controls. The feature is intended for administrators to review application access rights, detect anomalies, and take preventive actions, such as revoking access when necessary. When an exposure is identified, Vanta generates alerts within the platform, which may be reviewed by auditors and shared through integrated communication tools. The platform can also be used to facilitate compliance certification across a range of industry standards, while supporting internal security posture and documentation.

In addition, Vanta offers a Third-Party Risk Management feature that supports vendor risk assessments by analyzing external documentation, completing security questionnaires, and evaluating a vendor's security posture. In its Vanta Exchange feature, the platform allows for collaboration between organizations and third parties by enabling the exchange of security information, testing data integrations, and collecting documentation required for compliance.

Vanta began launching AI product capabilities in 2023, including integrations with large language model (LLM) providers. (Note: The AI functionality integrates models from providers such as OpenAI and Anthropic, among others.) These features expanded Vanta's functionality by generating recommendations for tests and policies aligned with specific compliance frameworks. Vanta's AI products use machine learning (ML) to extract and contextualize data from internal reports and existing frameworks to support users with defined security and compliance requirements.

In 2025, Vanta launched its agentic AI offering. Although Vanta's agent incorporates human review, the agent is intended to accelerate compliance processes that were previously handled manually. Vanta also offers an AI chatbot that assists users by answering questions and helping complete reports and questionnaires based on documents uploaded to the platform. The company does not train its models using customer data.

== See also ==
- List of unicorn startup companies
