= Dominion: Storm Over Gift 3 =

1998 video game

- Developers: Ion Storm; 7th Level
- Publisher: Eidos Interactive
- Designer: Todd Porter
- Artist: Jeremiah O'Flaherty
- Composer: Will Loconto
- Platform: Windows
- Release: NA: June 11, 1998; EU: 1998
- Genre: Real-time strategy
- Modes: Single-player, Multiplayer

Dominion: Storm Over Gift 3 is a military science fiction real-time strategy video game developed by Ion Storm, published by Eidos Interactive, and released for Microsoft Windows in 1998. The game was originally developed as a spin-off of the mech simulation game G-Nome by 7th Level. Ion Storm acquired both Dominion and its lead designer, Todd Porter, from 7th Level for completion.

== Gameplay ==
A major aspect of Dominion's design is that not all races are equal. Darken forces are sturdier, but are slower to build; Scorp forces cost much less to manufacture, but are weaker than the other races; Merc soldiers are more difficult to control, but are more accurate when firing; and the Humans are a balance of all features. In addition, each race also gets one weapon type unique unto itself. Darken has a "Cloaker which renders other vehicles invisible; the Mercs have the "Widow Maker", which converts enemy towers and tanks into allies; the Humans have the "M-Cat", which freezes any opponents' machinery from firing; and the Scorps have a "Digger", an underground transport to deliver up to six men anywhere visible on the playing field. Each of these vehicles are extremely fragile; an infantryman with a rifle can destroy it in one shot if not well protected.

There are a set of twelve missions, comprising a "campaign", for each of the races, where the computer opponent has the next level up in armaments, men or machines. For instance, when the player has light infantry and machine gun towers, the computer opponent will have bazooka men and rocket towers. There is a list of objectives to complete a mission, some requires the performing of certain tasks, such as recapture a fallen base or rescue a leader from prison, others to merely wipe out the opponent completely.

=== Multiplayer ===
There is a multiplayer mode that supports up to eight players. There are four built-in connection types, serial, modem, IPX and TCP/IP for direct play. Like other real-time strategy games the multiplayer options can be set to have high or low resources and slow to fast speed. MPlayer.com was launched with Dominion, which came pre-installed.

== Plot ==
The game takes place on the fictitious planet of Gift 3 where war has broken out between four different races: the Scorps, Darkens, Mercs and Humans. The setting is shared with G-Nome.

== Development ==
In November 1996, John Romero and Tom Hall left Id Software to form Ion Storm, but their excessive spending forced them to sign a deal with Eidos Interactive, which required them to provide six games for Eidos to publish. To quickly fulfill this requirement, Romero and Hall sought near-completed games for Ion Storm to polish before hand-off to Eidos. In November 1997, video game developer 7th Level exited the market, selling the intellectual property rights of its 1997 game G-Nome to Ion Storm for $1.8 million. When hired from 7th Level, designers Todd Porter and Jerry O'Flaherty were tasked with finishing their spinoff titled Dominion. Despite Romero and Hall believing they could finish development of Dominion in three months, which would cost $50,000, they ultimately needed a full team to work for more than a year.

In October 1997, other top members of Ion Storm thought of firing Porter because the game was running over schedule and budget, but Romero vetoed it. The team hoped to make it for under $3 million, but it had cost more than that by December 1997, six months before release. Porter became CEO of Ion Storm and the Dallas Observer said "He turned down a deal with Compaq computers that would have paid ION 75 cents to $1 for every Compaq computer sold with Dominion preinstalled, and would have guaranteed Ion a minimum of $1.5 million." Porter said that RTS games in 1997 "were a pretty disappointing lot" besides Age of Empires, since they "didn't really feel much like the old real-time strategy", but he thought Dominion was more like "old-school" games in the genre. The game was designed to have a simple interface because Porter thought that RTS games had gotten too complex, and Porter said that the interface would probably be borrowed by other games. It was released as Ion Storm's debut title in June 1998, to poor sales - with possibly less than 24,000 copies sold in four months.

Dominion employs a voxel-based graphics engine.

=== Soundtrack ===
Dominion features an electronic soundtrack by Will Loconto; tracks vary between dark atmospheric styles and techno/electro.

== Marketing ==
At E3 1996, 7th Level showcased Dominion by having staff pretend to play pre-rendered footage, as the game was too unfinished for live gameplay. The showcase neighbored Blizzard Entertainment's large booth for StarCraft, which led Blizzard to reboot their game to increase its visual distinctiveness. Blizzard's developers did not learn that 7th Level had presented pre-rendered footage until years after releasing StarCraft, which ultimately outcompeted Dominion by releasing three months earlier in 1998.

== Reception ==
Reception

Aggregate score
Aggregator	Score
GameRankings	55%

Review scores
Publication	Score
AllGame	3.5/5
CNET Gamecenter	7/10
Computer Games Strategy Plus	2.5/5
Computer Gaming World	2/5
Game Informer	8.5/10
GameSpot	5.9/10
Hyper	65%
IGN	4/10
Next Generation	2/5
PC Accelerator	6/10
PC Gamer (US)	55%
PC PowerPlay	55%
PC Zone	43%

The game received mixed reviews according to the review aggregation website GameRankings. Next Generation said that the game "should have shipped in a plain white box with 'Realtime Strategy Game' stamped on it."

The game sold poorly upon release. The Dallas Observer reported that "Dominion averaged 7,000 copies per month in the first four months it was on the shelves." In the United States, market tracking firm PC Data reported that its sales reached 9,952 units by the end of August 1998, for revenues of $367,600. This number rose to 14,000 units by November 30, 1998, which drew a total of $466,600 in revenue. GameSpy later declared Ion Storm's handling of the game one of the "25 Dumbest Moments in Gaming", noting that the game likely sold less than 10,000 copies.

The game was a runner-up for Computer Gaming World's 1998 "Coaster of the Year" award, which ultimately went to Jurassic Park: Trespasser. The staff wrote, "Ion Storm's initial release sailed like a lead balloon, complete with overhyped and ineffectual AI, 1995-era graphics, and a back story so bad that it had us wondering why we even briefly stopped playing StarCraft for this."
