= Ion Storm =

American video game developer

Ion Storm, L.P.
- Type: Subsidiary
- Industry: Video games
- Founded: November 15, 1996; 29 years ago in Dallas, Texas, US
- Founders: John Romero; Tom Hall; Todd Porter; Jerry O'Flaherty
- Defunct: February 9, 2005; 21 years ago
- Fate: Dissolved
- Headquarters: Austin, Texas, US
- Key people: John Romero; Tom Hall; Warren Spector
- Parent: Eidos Interactive (1999–2005)

Ion Storm, L.P. was an American video game developer founded in Dallas, Texas in November 1996 by John Romero and Tom Hall, both formerly of id Software; a branch in Austin, Texas was opened in 1997. In April 1999, Eidos Interactive acquired 51% of the company in exchange for advances to the developers.

Despite an impressive pedigree and high expectations, the company only produced one commercial and critical success, 2000's Deus Ex. The Dallas studio closed in July 2001, leaving the Austin studio as the new headquarters. After financial struggles at Eidos Interactive, the Austin studio followed with its own closure in February 2005.

== History ==
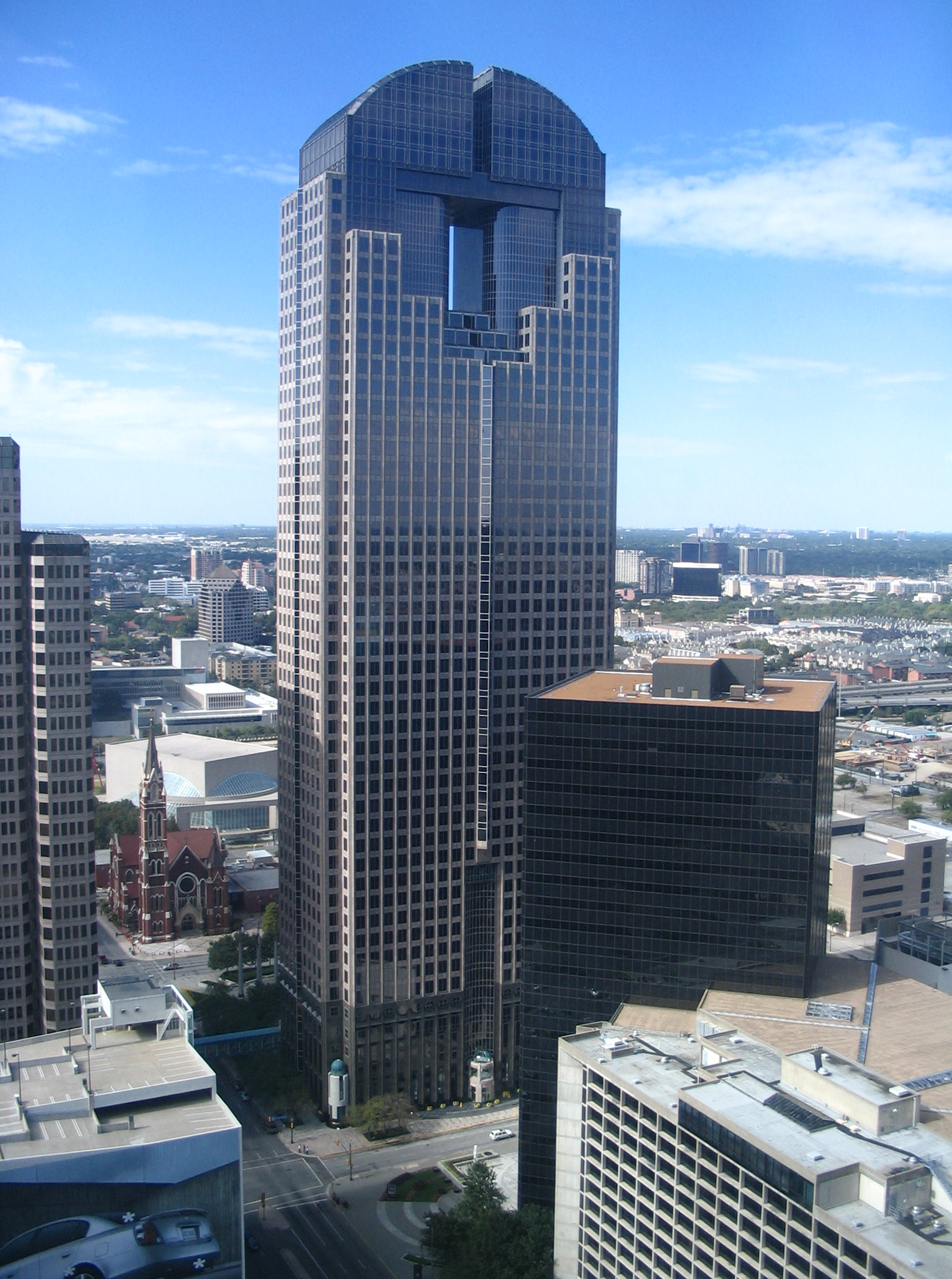
The Chase Tower, in which the Dallas studio was located

=== Formation ===
Ion Storm was founded by John Romero, Tom Hall, Todd Porter and Jerry O'Flaherty on November 15, 1996, with its headquarters in Dallas, Texas. Hall came up with the name, the "Storm" part coming from Porter's first project for the company. The company had signed a licensing deal with Eidos Interactive for six games, and the founders planned to scoop up titles from other companies that were close to completion, finish them, and push them out quickly to bring in initial revenue.

In a fashion similar to other dot com busts, the company spent lavishly on office decor and facilities for employees. The corporate headquarters of Ion Storm were located in Suite 5400, 22,000-square-foot (2,000 m^{2}) of space in a penthouse suite on the 54th floor, the top floor, of the Chase Tower in Downtown Dallas. Ion Storm spent $2 million on the facility. Lisa Chadderdon of Fast Company said that the penthouse location was "unusual". For the first ten years after the construction of the JPMorgan Chase Tower, the penthouse location had been unleased.

Russ Berger Design Group, a firm most known for its work in designing recording studios, was responsible for the interior design of the headquarters. This included a ten-foot-wide company logo set into the terrazzo floor of the lobby and matching green elevator doors. The headquarters included a "crash room", a dormitory facility with two beds, three couches, a VCR, a wide-screen television, and two telephone booths. It also housed a gaming room with a ping-pong table and four arcade machines, a changing area, and a shower room. The headquarters included these facilities because many employees in the video game industry work long hours at a time. The sun shone through the office's glass rooftop directly into the monitors of the employees, forcing them to cover their cubicles with black fabric.

=== Dominion: Storm Over Gift 3 ===
The company's first game was Todd Porter's real-time strategy Dominion: Storm Over Gift 3. Dominion was already partially completed by Todd Porter's previous employer, 7th Level, and was expected to take $50,000 and three months to complete. Instead, development continued for over a year, and cost over $100,000. When it was finally released in 1998 it received poor ratings and equally poor sales according to a report by the Dallas Observer.

=== Daikatana ===
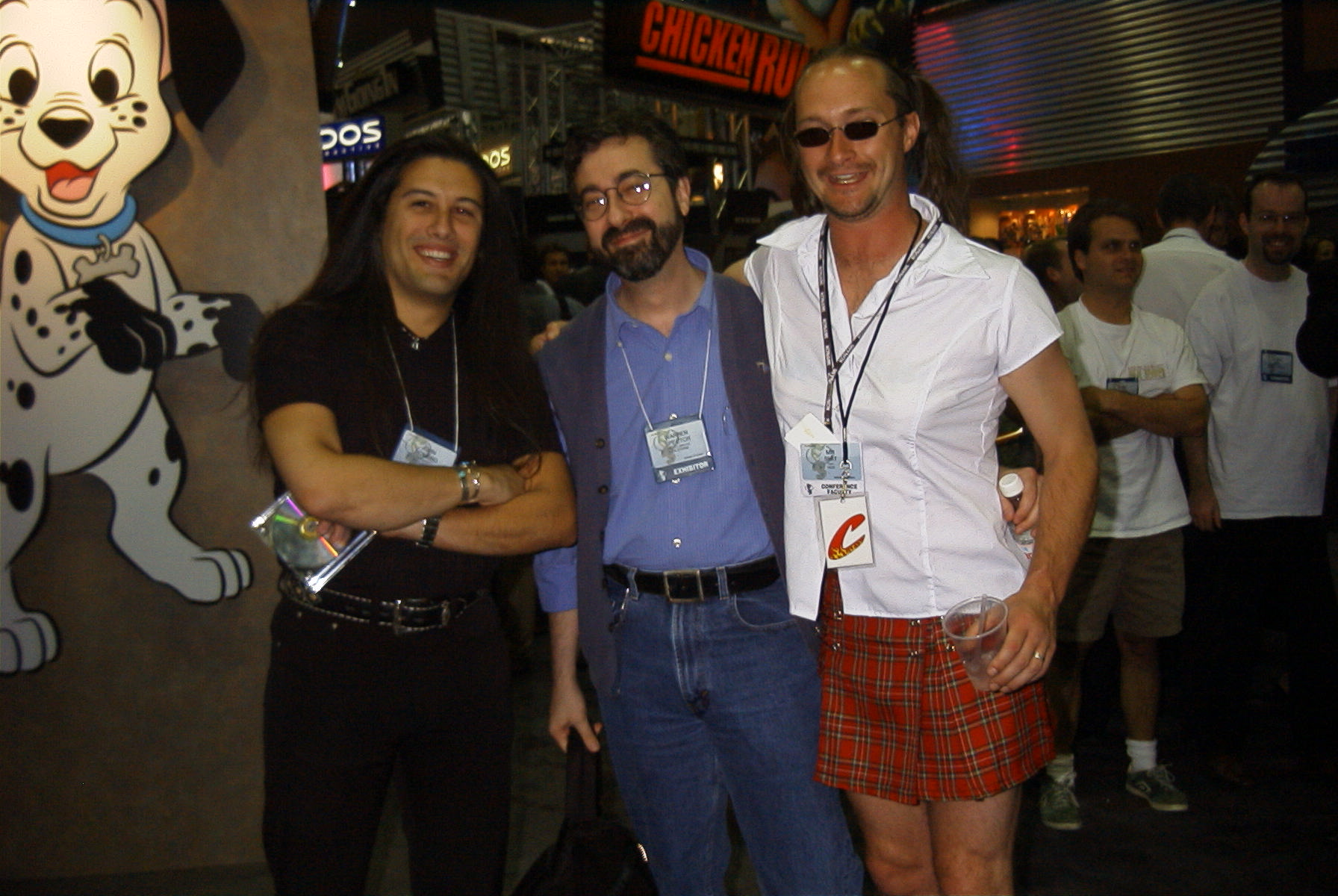
John Romero, Warren Spector and Mike Wilson at E3 2000

John Romero's Daikatana was meant to be finished within seven months of the founding of Ion Storm and was to use the Quake engine. From very early on in the game's development, Daikatana was advertised as the brainchild of John Romero, a man famous for his work at id Software in the development of Wolfenstein 3D, Doom and Quake. Time magazine gave Romero and Daikatana glowing coverage, saying "Everything that game designer John Romero touches turns to gore and gold." During that time, in April 1999, publisher Eidos Interactive acquired a 51% stake in the company, in exchange for advances to the developers. An early advertisement for Daikatana, created by marketer Mike Wilson and approved by Romero, was a red poster with large black lettering proclaiming "John Romero's about to make you his bitch", a reference to Romero's infamous trash talk during gaming. Nothing else was featured on this poster but a small tag-line reading "Suck It Down", an Ion Storm logo and an Eidos logo. However, already behind schedule, the decision was made to port the entire game to the Quake II engine, six months into development. Daikatana was ultimately released three years late in Spring 2000, after its promised launch date of Christmas 1997. The game was released to middling critical reviews, and an aggressive advertising campaign in 1997 touting Romero's name as the reason to buy the game backfired as fans grew angry over delays.

After the release of Daikatana, co-founders Romero and Hall, along with level designer Stevie Case, left the company in 2001 to form Monkeystone Games, a company that produced mobile games.

=== Deus Ex ===
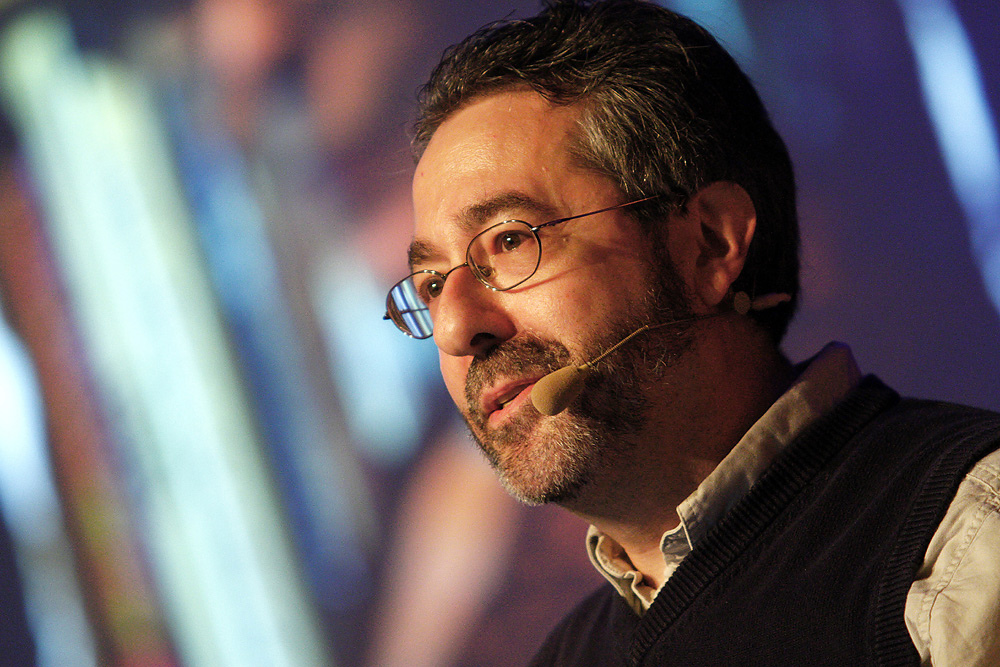
Deus Ex and Ion Storm director Warren Spector

In late 1997, Warren Spector was asked to found the Austin branch of Ion Storm. By keeping well clear of the troubles at the Dallas office, Ion Storm's Austin branch was more successful. Deus Ex, a first-person stealth shooter drawing from a melange of conspiracy theories, released to critical and commercial success in June 2000. With the demise of Looking Glass Studios, Eidos Interactive secured the rights to the Thief franchise and together with Spector tried to relocate as many of the Looking Glass team to Austin as was possible.

=== Anachronox ===
Like Daikatana, Tom Hall's role-playing game Anachronox was moved over to the Quake II engine. These changes brought costly delays to an already beleaguered product line. Although Anachronox received critical acclaim for its vast storyline and characters, it, too, was commercially unsuccessful on its release in June 2001.

=== History and closure ===
Romero and Hall left the company after producing Anachronox in July 2001. After the release of the game, Eidos Interactive closed the Dallas office, initially reported by Shacknews citing anonymous sources in May 2001. The Austin office continued to produce Deus Ex: Invisible War and Thief: Deadly Shadows until Spector's departure to "pursue personal interests outside the company" in 2004. A number of other senior staff also left at about the same time. On February 9, 2005, Eidos announced the closure of Ion Storm's Austin office.

== Games developed ==
=== Ion Storm Dallas ===
Year	Title	Platform(s)
1998	Dominion: Storm Over Gift 3	Microsoft Windows
2000	Daikatana	Microsoft Windows, Nintendo 64
2001	Anachronox	Microsoft Windows

=== Ion Storm Austin ===
Year	Title	Platform(s)
2000	Deus Ex	Microsoft Windows, Classic Mac OS, PlayStation 2
2003	Deus Ex: Invisible War	Microsoft Windows, Xbox
2004	Thief: Deadly Shadows	Microsoft Windows, Xbox

== Legacy ==
The rise and fall of the company is documented in great detail in the book Masters of Doom. Doom was just one of a series of blockbuster games Romero had designed, and Ion Storm was founded in no small part on his celebrity status within the industry. This elevation of the game creators over the products themselves caused problems early on, evidenced in a 1997 advertisement which hyped the subsequently delayed Daikatana by boasting "John Romero's About To Make You His Bitch....Suck it down".

In 2010, Romero would later apologize for the infamous advertisement. Romero stated in an interview that "up until that ad, I felt I had a great relationship with the gamer and the game development community and that ad changed everything. That stupid ad. I regret it and I apologize for it."

The critical and commercial failure of Daikatana was a major contributing factor in the closure of Ion Storm's Dallas office. ScrewAttack named this game the #7 bust on its 2009 "Top 10 Biggest Busts", which listed the biggest failures in gaming, due to its controversial advertising and the hype that Romero built on this game, which in the end turned out to be a failure. GameTrailers ranked this game the #2 biggest gaming disappointment of the decade (the 2000s), citing the game's terrible AI for friend and foe alike, pushed-back release dates, controversial magazine ad, and gossip-worthy internal drama (among other things) as "the embodiment of game's industry hubris."

Since its release, Deus Ex has appeared in a number of "Greatest Games of All Time" lists and Hall of Fame features. It was included in IGN's "100 Greatest Games of All Time" (#40, #21 and #34 in 2003, 2005 and 2007, respectively), "Top 25 Modern PC Games" (4th place in 2010) and "Top 25 PC Games of All Time" (#20 and #21 in 2007 and 2009 respectively) lists. GameSpy featured the game in its "Top 50 Games of All Time" (18th place in 2001) and "25 Most Memorable Games of the Past 5 Years" (15th place in 2004) lists, and in the site's "Hall of Fame". PC Gamer placed Deus Ex on its "Top 100 PC Games of All Time" (#2, #2, #1 by staff and #4 by readers in 2007, 2008, 2010 and 2010 respectively) and "50 Best Games of All Time" (#10 and #27 in 2001 and 2005) lists, and it was awarded 1st place in PC Zone's "101 Best PC Games Ever" feature. It was also included in Yahoo! UK Video Games' "100 Greatest Computer Games of All Time" (28th place) list, and in Edge's "The 100 Best Videogames" [sic] (29th place in 2007) and "100 Best Games to Play Today" (57th place in 2009) lists. Deus Ex was named the second-best game of the 2000s by Gamasutra. In 2012, Time named it one of the 100 greatest video games of all time, and G4tv ranked it as the 53rd best game of all time for its "complex and well-crafted story that was really the start of players making choices that genuinely affect the outcome." 1UP.com listed it as one of the most important games of all time, calling its influence "too massive to properly gauge."
