= Anachronox =

2001 role-playing video game

- North American box art
- Developer: Ion Storm
- Publisher: Eidos Interactive
- Director: Tom Hall
- Producer: Jake Strider Hughes
- Designer: Tom Hall
- Programmer: Brian Eiserloh
- Artists: Don Martinez; Lee Perry III; Ben Herrera
- Writer: Richard Zangrande Gaubert
- Composers: Will Nevins; Darren Walsh
- Engine: Quake II engine
- Platform: Microsoft Windows
- Release: NA: June 27, 2001; UK: July 6, 2001; AU: July 31, 2001
- Genre: Role-playing
- Mode: Single-player

Anachronox is a 2001 role-playing video game produced by Tom Hall and the Dallas Ion Storm games studio. The game is centered on Sylvester "Sly Boots" Bucelli, a down-and-out private investigator who looks for work in the slums of Anachronox, a once-abandoned planet near the galaxy's jumpgate hub. He travels to other planets, amasses an unlikely group of friends, and unravels a mystery that threatens the fate of the universe. The game's science fiction story was influenced by cyberpunk, film noir, and unconventional humor. The story features a theme of working through the troubles of one's past.

Gameplay in Anachronox is a mix of real-time exploration and turn-based combat; the player controls a party of up to three characters as they explore a 3D environment of futuristic cities, space vessels, and outdoor areas. Inspirations for the game include older role-playing video games such as Chrono Trigger and the Final Fantasy series, animator Chuck Jones and the novel Ender's Game. The game was built with a heavily modified version of id Software's Quake II engine, rewritten chiefly to allow a wider color palette, emotive animations and facial expressions, better lighting, particle effects, and camera effects.

The development of Anachronox was long and difficult. Originally planned for a third-quarter 1998 release, it was released worldwide in June 2001 for Microsoft Windows. Tom Hall planned to create a sequel with the copious content removed during production. Critics enjoyed the game and awarded it high marks for its design and story. Ion Storm's Dallas offices were closed mere days after the game's release. In 2002, Anachronox cinematic director Jake Hughes spliced together gameplay footage and cutscenes to create a feature-length, award-winning machinima film.

== Gameplay ==
Anachronox is a role-playing game similar in nature to many Japanese role-playing video games like Final Fantasy. The player controls a party of up to three characters as they explore a 3D environment (colloquially known as a "field map") of futuristic cities, space vessels, and outdoor areas. Players can swap for new party members, talk to non-player characters, and collect and shop for equipment and items. When players near an interactive character or item, a floating arrow-shaped electronic device called the LifeCursor appears, which lets the player click on the person or item. After a certain point in the story, players can travel by shuttle to other planets, triggering cutscenes of the shuttle trips. Each playable character has a unique skill, such as lockpicking, which may be used to solve puzzles. Some sequences involve minigames, such as an unnamed mission in which the player pilots a fighter spaceship to destroy enemies with lasers. Certain field maps also feature simple two-dimensional minigames, including the original games Ox and Bugaboo. The protagonist Boots also possesses a camera, which the player can use to take screenshots for their own enjoyment or as part of quest objectives.

Sylvester "Sly Boots" Bucelli using his pistol on enemies

Enemy encounters trigger a combat mode. As in Chrono Trigger, enemies are openly visible on field maps or lie in wait to ambush the party and thus are not random. Similar to Final Fantasy's Active Time Battle, each character has a meter that gradually fills with time. When the meter is full, characters can physically attack enemies, use MysTech magic, unleash BattleSkill attacks, use items, move to a different position, or use a nearby object to attack, if present. For playable characters and computer-controlled enemies, each attack has their number of hit points (a numerically based life bar) get reduced, which can be restored through healing items or MysTech slags. Use of MysTech and equippable shield cells require Neutron-Radiated Glodents (NRG), a separate energy reserve displayed beneath a character's life bar. NRG is replenished through certain items. Use of BattleSkills require Bouge, a third bar beneath NRG that automatically fills with time; players can use different BattleSkills depending on how full the Bouge bar is. Some characters must undergo certain plot developments to unlock their BattleSkills. When a playable character loses all hit points, he or she faints. If all the player's characters fall in battle, the game ends and must be restored from a previously saved game. Winning battles earns experience points and raises characters' levels, granting them improved statistics. These statistics can be viewed through the status screen, which displays important character information and current quests. Unlike many other RPGs, Anachronox displays a character's attributes with qualitative descriptors (such as Poor and Excellent) instead of integers.

=== MysTech ===
The Mysterium Tech (or MysTech) system allows players to use in-game objects collectively known as MysTech, and create new MysTech by using a configuration screen accessed through Elementor Host items. MysTech cannot be used until they are awakened after a certain story event. Eight basic colors of MysTech exist, representing different elements; for example, green represents poison. Players can use MysTech to inflict damage upon enemies, plague them with certain status effects (such as freezing them in place), or heal party members. Casting status effect-MysTech on party members will cure them if afflicted by enemy status spells. MysTech slabs and Elementor Hosts can be found as treasure in the game world or bought from shops. To create MysTech, players place colored bugs (found on small hills in several game locations) in empty slots on an Elementor Host. The color of bugs placed in the function slot determines the color of MysTech, while other slots modify the power and/or range of the spell. Players can add special bugs known as Cobalt Crawlers to make a spell target all enemies instead of one; a Host filled with eight Crawlers unlocks a secret spell. The effect of bugs can be amplified by feeding them petals from Lifeflowers, which can be found scattered throughout the world of Anachronox. Special types of Hosts with two or three different functions allow players to pick which MysTech function to use in battle.

== Plot ==
=== Setting ===
The game takes place on Anachronox (a portmanteau of anachronism and noxious, meaning "poison from the past"), a small planet floating inside a huge artificial sphere known as Sender One. Husks of futuristic cities exist on artificial tectonic plates, which constantly shift to connect different parts of the planet. Inhabitants believe that diseased aliens were quarantined there eons ago, resulting in the name Anachronox. Northern Anachronox is clean and upscale, while southern Anachronox is crime-ridden and run-down. Humanity travels to different planets from Sender One, which had been the center of a transportation system for a race of non-humanoids enabling faster-than-light travel. Inbound and outbound traffic stops at Sender Station, an orbiting construct above Sender One with hotels and a red light district. Civilizations conduct business using currency like the one-dollar coin known as a "loonie", while several people collect MysTech—shards of rock with markings, believed to be dormant weapons or art pieces created by an extinct alien race. MysTech were first found 300 years ago, and are poorly understood, though avidly collected.

Other planets in Sender One include Sunder, Hephaestus, Democratus, and Limbus. The galaxy's scientific community is headquartered on the temperate planet of Sunder, and people are only permitted to go there if they are sufficiently intelligent. Hephaestus is an important religious center. A mostly volcanic planet, Hephaestus hosts a town and temple complex of monks who study MysTech. Democratus is climatically similar to Earth, with regions of desert, snow, forest, and prairie. Several populations of different sentient species exist on the surface, but the planet is ruled by a race of tall, thin humanoids with large craniums who dwell on a large mechanical ring constructed around the planet. This race is obsessed with the ideal of democracy, and though they possess incredible scientific and engineering knowledge, they are constantly bogged down by their own ineptitude and the frailties of the democratic process. Limbus is known as the "planet of death", as voyagers never return; its surface is arid and rocky, with sparse vegetation. A planet mentioned but not seen in the game is Krapton, home to superheroes and villains. Most of Krapton's human population has fled, tired of being constantly abducted and saved by warring superpeople.

=== Characters ===
From left to right, Grumpos, Rho, Boots, and PAL-18 approach the camera

The protagonist of Anachronox is Sylvester "Sly Boots" Bucelli, a human and former private detective on Anachronox. Twenty-nine years old and described as "bold, brash, and overconfident", Boots has gotten himself into trouble and now runs his agency out of rented storage space above a seedy bar. His only friends are PAL-18, his spirited, sarcastic robot assistant since childhood, and Fatima Doohan, his secretary. Fatima was fatally injured and digitized by Boots onto a PDA-analogue "LifeCursor", where she bitterly lives to render assistance. Several allies join Boots over the course of the game; first is 71-year-old Grumpos Matavastros, a "scholar, outdoorsman, eccentric recluse, and renaissance man"—and a very grumpy person. A former curator of the MysTech museum on Anachronox, Grumpos devotes his life to studying the artifacts. Dr. Rho Bowman joins the party on Sunder; she is a brilliant scientist who's been branded a heretic after publication of her book, MysTech Awake! The team then gains support from Democratus, an eccentric planet boasting a planetary ring and brilliant technology. Said technology includes having the planet shrink to human height to be part of the team. Two further allies are the femme fatale Stiletto Anyway—a 25-year-old former companion of Boots known for being stealthy and aloof—and Paco "El Puño" Estrella, a washed up superhero who's turned to alcoholism after his comic book series was canceled. Their foes include Detta, a heavyset crime boss/kingpin on planet Anachronox, and several other monsters and shady characters.

=== Story ===
Sly Boots lives in a cheap apartment above Rowdy's, a bar in the seedy "Bricks" section of South Anachronox. Grumpos Matavastros commissions Boots to find a piece of MysTech, but a crime boss called Detta accosts them and steals it. Grumpos, Boots, and robot assistant PAL-18 then seek out Dr. Rho Bowman, an expert on MysTech, at an institute for troublesome scientists on Sunder. She undertakes an experiment to activate MysTech, apparently causing the destruction of Sunder. Rho and the others escape the planet on a shuttle, and drift in space for seventeen days until they are brought on board a habitat ring around the planet Democratus. Rho discovers that all MysTech is now active, and can grant powers and spells. Boots pilots a fighter ship to save Democratus from insectoid invaders known as the Verilent Hive. The heroes return to Sender Station's Lounge of Commerce; Democratus joins the party, the High Council having shrunken the planet to human height. While searching for equipment, Boots earns money as an erotic dancer and encounters Stiletto Anyway, an old flame who's become an assassin and plots revenge against Detta. Rho explains that the universe operates on the Big Bounce principle; a universe that forms with a Big Bang will eventually suffer a Big Crunch, giving rise to a new Big Bang. She explains that Sunder was destroyed by an injection of matter from the previous universe, which will hasten the current universe's Big Crunch. If enough matter is switched between universes, the previous one can escape a Big Crunch and the current one will cease to exist.

The team heads to Hephaestus, transformed to a tourist destination now that MysTech is active. They realize MysTech functions can be customized through the use of small, colored bugs and a MysTech host. Sly gains audience with the Grand Mysterium, who tells him that in the next universe, species known as "Chaos" and "Order" fought a bitter war. Order enslaved Chaos in the current universe, but Chaos wishes to escape to the previous universe to prevent future ones from existing and thus eradicate Order. The Mysterium tells Sly he must find and seal off the gate to the previous universe, and to journey to Limbus. The team is captured en route by comic supervillain Rictus; Boots meets former superhero Paco in his prison. Rictus flushes them into empty space; the High Council of Democratus restores the planet to its original size to save them.

Scenes of reflection reveal the past on Anachronox. Stiletto had been Sly's young assistant at his upscale agency; he was in love with her, but Fatima was in love with him. Detta abducted Stiletto, spurring Sly's search. Her love unrequited, Fatima went into his office one night to leave a note of resignation. Sly burst in with news of Stiletto's location, and he and Fatima pursued Detta across Anachronox by flying car. Sly lost control, wrecking it and accidentally killing Fatima. Suffering from major depression, Sly ran up debts with Detta to pay for Fatima's revival inside the LifeCursor.

The team regather at Democratus and journey to Limbus, where they meet creatures of the same race as the Grand Mysterium. They repel invaders called the "Dark Servants" from an orbital portal. The leader of Limbus explains that though Chaos is enslaved in the current universe, the Dark Servants (who originate from the current universe) are trying to free them and have found a way into the previous universe, where they initiated the destruction of Sunder. MysTech is a gift from the forces of Order to help the current universe's inhabitants fight Chaos. The team return to Anachronox to find Rowdy, a disguised citizen of Limbus who has been searching for the gate to the previous universe. Rowdy notes that they must destroy the key to the gate, now in the possession of Detta. The team infiltrate his fortress, kill him, and prepare to destroy the key at the gate itself—the fountain spiral of Anachronox. Grumpos seizes it, revealing himself to be a Dark Servant; he escapes with the agents of Chaos into the previous universe. Sly and the others prepare to follow them and save the universe; the game ends as they approach the gate.

== Development ==
=== Conception ===
Ion Storm began developing Anachronox in 1996, funded by Eidos Interactive as part of a three-game deal alongside Daikatana and an unplanned third game. Formal announcement followed in April 1997, promising a third-quarter 1998 release. Tom Hall, veteran designer and one of the founders of Ion Storm, helmed the project and originated most of its story and design. Other founding members of the team were Todd Porter (producer), Jake Hughes (associate producer and director of cinematics), Ben Herrera (artist), Brian Eiserloh (programmer), and David Namaksy (lead mapper). Mapper Larry Herring was hired after being mentored by John Romero and submitting a custom Doom 2 map to Tom Hall. Hall first conceived Anachronox in his bathroom, prompting him to install a whiteboard and sound-recorder in his shower, as well as several notepads around his house for future ideas; he had conceived the character Sly Boots years earlier in college. He wrote a 460-page design document (completed in May 1997) outlining the universe of Anachronox, beyond the game's scope; other game design documents of the period, he noted, were usually only 125 pages in size. He then condensed the story, leaving a third beyond the scheduled game. The game's design phase lasted three months. Hall made plans for two expansion packs from the outset of development, owing to the huge story. Developers told Next Generation the story would be "Campbellian" and feature immense environments. Hall noted in mid-1997, "Not since Keen has a universe been so clear in my head."

Tom Hall announced that Anachronox would feature a "turbulent story with a roller coaster of emotion", and promised it would bring personality and humor to the role-playing genre. Hall aimed to make an emotionally gripping, cinematic experience from the beginning: "I want this game to answer the question, 'Can a computer make you cry?' I want to make the characters so warm and friendly and lovable and identifiable... I want to start them off in fun situations, but as the game goes on, I want the atmosphere to get darker and darker. Friends betray the lead character, other friends die, and you will feel some of what they feel because you have been with these people for 50 hours, and in a sense, lived part of their lives with them." Hall remarked that the characters were facets of his childhood. He later compared the name Anachronox (meaning poison from the past) and the internal struggles of each character, caused by turbulent events in their pasts and "psychic poison." Hall aimed to feature high-quality direction and camera-work in Anachronox, reminiscent of epic cinematic themes in role-playing video games like the Final Fantasy franchise. Hall enlisted producer Jake Hughes to direct cut scenes; Hughes had previously worked on several short independent films. Developers used real-time game cutscenes instead of live-action cinematics to avoid "[taking] players out of the game." Hall remarked, "All these games switch to cutscenes that look five hundred times better than the game. The secret is not to let the cutscenes kick the game's ass."

Tom Hall chose the Quake engine for Anachronox; its developer John Carmack took interest in its use for a role-playing game. Ion Storm would soon switch to the Quake II engine, necessitating a transition from December 1997 to March 1998. The team would implement engine support for 32-bit color, particle systems, a spline-based camera scriptor, facial deformations, and lip-synching. The team mimicked filmography via sweeping camera shots to compensate for graphical limitations. Facial deformation involved moving the vertices of a character's face, thereby creating emotional expressions and body language. Developers built the first models in Lightwave; the main characters had polygon counts of 500–700. By the end of 1997, Hall had scripted interaction with 130 non-player characters for 160 planned locations. Hall cited Chrono Trigger as a strong influence; previewers drew parallels with the Final Fantasy series and Ultima III. As in Chrono Trigger, battles were scripted and not caused by random, unavoidable encounters. Hall explained, "if there's a dragon guarding a door, I want the chance to say, 'whoah, look at the time, gotta run', not, 'think I'll check this door. (*roaaar*) Dragon? Where the hell was that?!?'" The team expanded the Final Fantasy-style combat by allowing actions to be queued in advance. Hall listed some of his inspirations for Anachronox in mid-2000: "In movies, some inspirational people are Spielberg, Hitchcock, George Roy Hill, Rob Reiner, and now Sam Mendes. Also a big fan of Chuck Jones, who directed Warner Brothers cartoons. Novels: Gateway, Ender's Game, Snow Crash, Hitchhiker's, so many more. Games: Chrono Trigger, Final Fantasy, LucasArts adventures (Ron Gilbert and Tim Schafer rock), Ape Escape (buy it now), Mario, Ultima III, Wizardry I, oh, I'm sure I'm forgetting some!" Hall also drew dramatic inspiration from a scene in Chrono Trigger in which the characters discuss the theme of regret around a campfire.

=== Programming and design ===
As production continued, Tom Hall dubbed the game's scripting language "APE" (Anachronox Programming Language). Hall explained, "I call it my new Apple II because it's so much fun to program in and it takes all the drudgery out of it. It's sort of if you mushed together C, Basic and Java in a way—for programming people it's sort of Windows based. It began as a defined dialogue window, but provided variables so that you could position and move a picture. So from there it grew like UNIX with little bits and pieces, and you have things that initialize data to the window, things that constantly update the window, and things that happen after the window, in little code chunks and with that you can do any little thing." Hall wrote and coded the mini-game Bugaboo for Anachronox in 15 hours to demonstrate the environment's simplicity. Other tools developed for the game were B.E.D. (a battle editor), ION Radiant (for level design, based on QERadiant), NoxDrop (for item and character placement), and Planet (a spline-based camera system coded by Joey Liaw). Ion Storm worked with QuakeEd developer Robert Duffy to create QERadiant, later adapted to ION Radiant. Hall lauded Planet: "you can control entities on paths, trigger events, manipulate particles, and do just about anything you please. One of the more common team beliefs is that the only true limit to Planet is the person controlling it." Hall aimed to provide several end-user modification tools, such as one to allow gamers to create their own MysTech elements. Other programs would allow implementation of new dialogue, voice-acting, and camera work. Ion Storm developed tutorials and documentation for each tool.

Developers tasked both art and map design personnel with creating levels, ensuring visual quality. Hall implemented a "grow as you play" philosophy, choosing to show certain features and statistics (like "Beat" or the use of MysTech) only after the player enabled their use. Developers sought to make the game accessible to expert and casual players through two statistic displays—numerical or qualitative (using categories such as "very good" or "bad"). Hall disparaged complicated number systems found in other games: "One of the things I hate about RPGs is, you've got, like, 'here's this thing and here's that thing' and it's like 'this is 52 and that's 53' I mean, what's the difference? It's like, OK it's 'a point,' and the formula will come up to be like 'two points' and like, sure, that's going to make a difference. So now I have to hit the guy three times..." Hall also sought to ensure players knew their next goal, and invented the character of Fatima Doohan to keep track of missions. Fatima's name is a pun born from the phrase, "What am I doing?" Hall named her after the experience of loading an old saved game in an RPG and having forgotten what comes next in the current quest or storyline.

Ion Storm contracted Soundelux Design Music Group to provide music for Anachronox. The firm hired Bill Brown for additional music. Tom Hall was impressed with Brown's work, particularly music for the planet Democratus. Hall worked with musician Ron Jones and a local Dallas band to record the game's two funk numbers by mid-1998. Tom Hall planned for each character to have their own theme music, and for songs to change via interaction or exploration. He spoke of the planned music, "The Anachronox sound will be industrial, mixed with forties bluesy swing. As you get on later in the game, the music gets scarier, more chaotic, and gets down to hard-core metal." Developers integrated DirectMusic support in 1999 to allow dynamic changing of background music. Sound programmer Henrik Jonsson implemented 3D sound and other capabilities using the Miles Sound System. Developers also planned to use software called Magpie Pro to lip-sync animated mouths to spoken words. The team chose not to record voices for each line of dialogue, as Tom Hall felt certain speech would become repetitive. The Undermain Theatre group of Dallas provided several voices. Tom Hall voiced PAL-18 reportedly because "no one else got it goofy enough".

=== Promotion and later development ===
Ion Storm debuted a trailer for the game at E3 1997. The team worked several long nights and slept in a cardboard fort (named "Fort Nox") in the office to prepare the trailer. A thief stole the developers' laptop at the Dallas airport, requiring Ion Storm to upload a new demo for the conference. Hall continued writing and designing; he invented the Brebulan language by creating several phonemes and glyphs of the letter 8 turned on its side. Ben Herrera completed several sketches of characters and worlds by August 1997, and the team hoped to achieve full engine functionality by September 2, Hall's birthday. The game would suffer serious delays in its production. Eidos regularly sent producer James Poole to Dallas to check progress. After Ion Storm exhausted the initial $13 million provided for Daikatana and Anachronox, Eidos purchased a controlling stake in the company to install John Kavanagh as president in hopes of speeding development; monthly expenditures meanwhile rose to $1.2 million.

Ion Storm solicited feedback from fans after demonstrating progress on Anachronox at E3 1998, and assured inclusion of a multiplayer mode. Tom Hall touted, "It is going to be very cinematic and about as non-linear as you can get. Some levels will be bigger than anything ever seen in a 3-D environment. We are really pushing the engine for this, with loads of textures." Developers made two demonstrations; the second featured lasers, lens flare, and volumetric fog. The gaming press received Anachronox well; one reporter wrote the game was "stunningly beautiful...[with] some of the most superb effects ever seen in a computer game, including rippling water, stunning laser lights and shadow effects". Another wrote that the game would be "graphically spectacular, with detailed characters". Panelists at E3 nominated Anachronox in the "Most Promising Game" and "Best RPG" categories for the Game Critics Awards. Ion Storm planned for a 1999 release, and unveiled new screenshots at the 1998 European Computer Trade Show. Among the game's maps developed in 1998 were Hephaestus (polished by David Namaksy); Whitendon (Iikka Keränen); Democratus, "Matrix 0", and certain interiors of Anachronox (Larry Herring); and the city of Limbus (Rich Carlson). Lead programmer Joey Liaw left Ion Storm to attend Stanford University in mid-1998. That November, several developers at Ion Storm departed to form their own company; among them was David Namaksy, lead level designer for Anachronox. Leaked e-mails evidencing leadership struggles at Ion Storm the following January eroded morale among the remaining team.

As of January 1999, Ion Storm CEO Todd Porter expected the game to ship 2.5 million copies. Ion Storm decided to produce a sequel for Anachronox around early 1999, feeling there would otherwise be too much content for one game, requiring prohibitive costs and delays. Team member Brian Eiserloh noted that several art assets had already been created for the sequel. By May 1999, the team had settled on a cast of 450 non-player characters, and planned for a late 1999 or early 2000 release date. Ion Storm launched the Anachronox website in early 1999 with a movie-style trailer. Tom Hall featured four Anachronox non-player characters in his online tongue-in-cheek spoof of Kasparov versus the World. Among the game's maps completed in 1999 were the Bricks slums of Anachronox (Seneca Menard), Ballotine (Josh Jay), Sender Station (Lee Dotson), others parts of Democratus (Matt Sophos), the Casinox area of Anachronox (Brian Patenaude), and the junkyard maze of Anachronox. Tom Hall reported in 1999 that an option was being developed to remove adult themes, later manifested as an option to turn off profanity. Ion Storm demonstrated the game at E3 1999; the team drove an RV to the event, which suffered a blowout and electrical failure. Computer Games Magazine afterward commented that Anachronox had "wider roots than a Banyan grove and more promise per square byte than a CD collection of political speeches."

Hall personally invented and scripted Boots's erotic dancing mini-game. He noted, "we're not above degrading our main character." Ion Storm showed off the mini-game at E3 2000, drawing humored reactions. Art director Lee Perry noted in March 2000 that perfecting the battle system was the biggest remaining hurdle for release. Ion Storm promoted a fall 2000 release date in May, and IGN reported in July that a Dreamcast port of Anachronox was planned for production after the PC version's release. Ion Storm issued a clarification that they were only considering a Dreamcast port. The team finished the game's control setup in August. Ion Storm loaned staff to the team of Daikatana to speed its release in summer 2000. Though losing money, Eidos allowed development of Anachronox to continue due their high esteem of Tom Hall, as well as a desire not to punish the game's team for the delays resulting from assisting Daikatana. Eidos maintained no expectations of profit, and merely hoped Anachronox would recoup its budget.

The team began working six-day weeks by late 2000. By 2001, the team was working 12- to 16-hour days and 6- to 7-day weeks. Hall described weekly bug meetings before release: "you see 100 bugs at the start of the week, fix the 80 you can replicate, and then meet the next Monday to address the 200 bugs they found, fix the 160 you can replicate, then meet to discuss the 400 they found...the time in-between is scary. Usually, the programmers find the bug, then stumble out of their cube, 'we were SO lucky to find that' or 'how did that EVER work?' It's like some bizarre divination method that no one is quite sure how it finds things, but no one wants to 'disturb the mojo'." Several Internet rumors that Ion Storm would soon close spread in May 2001. By June 2001, all dialogue had been recorded and Ion Storm was working on balancing, playtesting, and adjusting gameplay; release was set for the next month. Anachronox went gold and shipped to manufacturers in late June.

=== Release and patches ===
Anachronox was released on June 27, 2001, in North America, July 6 in the United Kingdom, and July 31 in Australia. PC Gamer packaged a game demo of Anachronox with its 100th issue. The Canberra Times staged a giveaway of three game copies to coincide with its release in Oceania. By the end of 2001, sales of Anachronox in North America had reached 20,480 units, according to PC Data. Vice later estimated sales four months after initial launch at 40,000 units. The game was rereleased in Oceania as a budget title in 2004.

Team member Lucas Davis compiled the development tools and documentation for Anachronox and released them in August 2001. Four bug-fixing patches exist for Anachronox. Ion Storm created the first (1.01), which fixes a buffer overrun crash occurring especially under Windows 2000. Ion Storm released the first patch (1.01) on July 2, 2001, shortly before its offices were shuttered. Joey Liaw set up a GeoCities website for reporting bugs and technical information after the game's release, and worked on a new patch in his spare time. The second patch (1.02, or build 44) was released in May 2003. This patch overhauls the save-game system, adds taxi-cabs between distant points in the Bricks and provides important stability fixes. It was followed by another patch by Joey Liaw, version 1.02 (build 45), released September 2003. In April 2004, a fan-made unofficial patch got released (version 1.02 (build 46) which fixes most of the remaining bugs. Fans have translated the game into German and released a conversion patch. Level designer Rich Carlson released a scrapped secret level for Anachronox in February 2004 after finding it on an old floppy disk.

== Reception ==
Reception

Aggregate scores
Aggregator	Score
GameRankings	80%
Metacritic	77/100

Anachronox earned positive reviews from critics. The Daily Telegraph called it the most original game Ion Storm had produced, while The Scotsman's reviewer appreciated its "many original touches". PC Gamer featured Anachronox four times in its top 100 PC games lists: #16 (2007), #17 (2008), #61 (2010), & #76 (2015). It was also USA Today's Game of the Week. Writer Jeff Green lamented that Ion Storm had shut down after Anachronox; he called it "easily the best console-style RPG ever made for the PC."

Reviewers highlighted the gameplay style, branded an unusual mix between role-playing video games and PC first-person shooters. Some compared it to the Final Fantasy series and Deus Ex. The Evening Standard wrote, "Anachronox swaps puzzlement for humour while keeping the character interaction, deep storyline and strategic battles that make the Japanese games so good." Computer Gaming World felt the game "incorporates the best elements of the adventure and role-playing genres." In contrast, Next Generation felt the genre-blending resulted in generic gameplay at times. Lyndon Russell of the Herald Sun praised the basic mechanics, though he found the combat predictable. Erik Wolpaw praised the battle system's unique focus on movement, but wished characters could wait for a turn rather than perform an action. The puzzle elements, such as those brought by Fatima, were well-received, even considered "indispensable".

The game's aesthetics were strongly praised. One reviewer appreciated the variety of styles in the music; it has been compared to Yanni, Enya, John Tesh, and sci-fi scores. Alan Dang contrarily found the music at times "neutral" and generic; Paul Ward found it pleasant but sparse. Numerous critics praised the voice acting and dialogue. The game's cinematic cutscenes were also acclaimed; Computer and Video Games noted they were "superbly used for laughs or to create a real sense of dramatic tension", while Next Generation wrote that Anachronox would be remembered as the germination point for blending interactive gaming and cinema. The Guardian, while also giving praise, found them somewhat predictable. Several reviewers praised the field map and level design of all but the last levels. Earlier ones were said to contain many "little details that bring the game to life" and significant immersion. The later levels were less well received, with one reviewer suspecting that Ion Storm ran out of time to polish the game, as some end-game locations were "hideously ugly, with huge slab-like polygons, dodgy backdrops and pixelated low resolution textures". The Guardian felt the lighting was too dark in general, while Kevin Cheung of The Sydney Morning Herald found the graphics blocky.

Reviewers hailed the story, characters, setting, and dialogue of Anachronox, citing its science fiction themes and offbeat, quirky humor. The Advertiser summarized the plot as "a beefy storyline loaded with strong characters, powerful dialogue, outrageous humour, seemingly endless surprises and a wild ride around the galaxy." Elliott Chin singled out the game's humor, which, while divisive of Computer Gaming World's staff at first, won it the publication's "Best Use of Humor" 2001 award. Even apart from humor, the dialogue was acclaimed as "so clever, it almost distracts from the game play" and as "very natural and colloquial". David Gordon of The Independent enjoyed the game for its "dark and ominous" plot and setting, centered on the quest to stop the destruction of the universe. The setting was compared to Blade Runner, film noir, The Matrix, Total Recall and the Dark City franchise. Reviewers enjoyed the game's odd characters and how the team of "has-beens and rejects" brought new life to the genre, particularly by averting the coming-of-age cliché. Sly was well-received, described as a "typical downtrodden B-movie private eye", a "Mickey Spillane-style hero" in a cyberpunk setting, and a "space-age Sam Spade". Several critics complained about the game's slow start on the planet Anachronox, especially its elevator-riding scenes. Reviewer Elliott Chin disagreed, evoking "a superb sense of timing, starting out small and slowly building to the main event", while David Phelan stated that strong character writing would encourage gamers to play beyond the "pedestrian-paced" opening scenes.

Several critics took issue with the game's graphics and outdated Quake II engine; reviewer Stephen Hunt named the game "a muddy affair" due to the "elderly" engine. Some reviewers, however, felt the game's charm made the engine's age irrelevant. Reviewers also encountered several software bugs and glitches, among them incompatibility with Windows 2000 and a bug forcing the player to repeat a sequence near the end several times. However, they differed in their opinions of the game as a result of them, ranging from "nearly unplayable" to "a flawed classic." Reviewers also criticized the game's restricted display resolution choices; players could only choose from two options at polar ends of hardware requirements.

== Legacy ==
Before releasing Anachronox, Ion Storm retextured characters and adapted sequences from the game for Shiner, a production by the Undermain Theatre. Scenes from the game were used to illustrate the vivid imagination and struggles of a paralyzed woman named Xela. Anachronox references the films Miller's Crossing and Barton Fink through street addresses on planet Anachronox; Tom Hall had studied acting at the University of Wisconsin–Madison and volunteered as an usher for Undermain. Though received well, the game did not prevent the closure of Ion Storm's Dallas office in July 2001; John Romero and Tom Hall departed after its release. The game became "semi-obscure"; Tom Hall explained: "Millions were spent making it, and upon release, $50,000 (~$84,339 in 2024) advertising it." He reflected on the game in 2007:

[It was] hubris to take 15 people and say you're going to make a console-style RPG, but, well, that's what we did. It wasn't insanely buggy compared to some titles, but it was rushed out the door. Eidos wanted to ship it. If we'd shipped Joey [Liaw]'s final build, it would have been very stable... I think most people didn't know the game was out. I sing the praises of Eidos for sticking with us through all the craziness—they were amazing. But they spent millions on the game, and in the tens of thousands on advertising. I think it could have found a pretty strong audience. But with all the craziness that had gone on, I feel fortunate that people got to experience it at all... People still write to me saying they found a copy, that they played and loved the game, and that they wished they'd heard about it coming out at the time.

— Tom Hall

Vice published a 2021 retrospective on the development of Anachronox, with the development team fondly remembering Hall's leadership. Vice concluded that Anachronox was an "unqualified success", writing that Tom Hall successfully translated the 2D console JRPG experience into a 3D PC game whose adult themes, varied gameplay, and unique dialogue fully realized his "ridiculously ambitious" vision. Hall later reflected, "There are many sadder stories than this one...we got our games out."

=== Machinima film ===
Cinematic director Jake Hughes independently combined the game's cut-scenes into a two-and-a-half-hour film titled Anachronox: The Movie, released as 13 MPEG files on Machinima.com. The work was considered by some to be machinima's first feature-length production and one of its most ambitious projects (although The Seal of Nehahra predated it by a few years). Judges at the 2002 Machinima Film Festival (MFF) awarded it Best Picture, Best Writing, and Best Technical Achievement. Machinima.com's editors said of the film, "Anachronox: The Movie is a tour de force, one of the finest Machinima films produced to date, and probably the most accomplished Machinima feature to date. Hell, it managed to hold two overworked jury members in a room for two and a half hours before the MFF 2002—what more can we say?" As of 2003, Machinima.com planned to release the film on DVD with extra footage and artwork. In 2006, the DVD images got distributed via BitTorrent.

=== Sequel ===
Tom Hall felt the story of Anachronox was too large for one game (requiring an estimated 70 hours of gameplay), and planned for two expansion packs in 1998. Each expansion pack would represent another third of the overall story. He confirmed in 1999 that Anachronox would be followed by only one sequel; several art assets had already been created for the sequel by mid-2000. Hall speculated in 2000 that further adventures in two new universes may take place after the sequel. Ion Storm's closure nixed plans for a continuation; Hall has unsuccessfully tried to purchase the intellectual property rights to the Anachronox universe. He later stated that he did not regret ending Anachronox on a cliffhanger, as most characters had resolved their inner turmoil.

Hall noted in 2007 that other team members were willing to come back to help: "We went through such turmoil but stayed for the love of the universe, the game and each other. Former team members often mention that if I ever got the intellectual property back and was going to make Anachronox 2, just tell them when and where. We have, as we say, 'The Love.'" Hall remarked in 2010, "If I don't do the game in the next 10 years, I'll just write up the rest of the story and put it on my website for closure, how about that?".

On February 17, 2015, Square Enix announced that it will allow developers to create games based on some of their old Eidos IPs via the Square Enix Collective project, including the Anachronox IP.
