= Battleship (disambiguation) =

A battleship is a large, heavily armored warship.

Battleship may also refer to:

== Geography ==
- Battleship, West Virginia, a community in the United States
- Battleship Butte, a butte in Utah, United States
- Battleship Cove, a maritime museum in Massachusetts, US
- Battleship (Antarctica), a massif
- Battleship Rock, a butte in Utah, United States

== Games ==
- Battleship (game), a guessing game for two players
  - Battleship (puzzle), a logic puzzle based on the game
  - Battleships (video game), a 1987 computer video game based on the original game
  - Battleship (1993 video game), a NES and Sega Game Gear video game by Mindscape
  - Battleship (1996 video game), a PC video game by Hasbro Interactive
  - Battleship: Surface Thunder, a 2000 PC video game based on the original game
- Battleship (2012 video game), a game based on the 2012 Battleship film

== Music ==
- "Battleships" (song), a song by Daughtry
- "Battleship", a song by Red Hot Chili Peppers from Freaky Styley

== Other ==
- Battleship (film), a 2012 science fiction action film
- Battleship (horse), an American thoroughbred racehorse
- Battleship (rocketry), a non-functional rocket or rocket stage used to test a launch vehicle
