= List of war amputees =

This is a list of soldiers who have had their limbs amputated.

== 1700-1799 ==
Image	Name	Lifespan	Rank	Country	War(s)	Limb Loss	Date of injury	Description
	Horatio Nelson, 1st Viscount Nelson	(1758–1805)	Vice-admiral of the White	British Empire	First Anglo-Maratha War, American Revolutionary War, War of the First Coalition (WIA), War of the Second Coalition (WIA) and War of the Third Coalition	Right arm	July 25, 1797	During the Battle of Santa Cruz de Tenerife on July 25, 1797, Nelson was on a boat and was hit in the arm by grapeshot. He had his arm amputated and was hailed as a hero when he returned to England.

== 1800-1899 ==
Image	Name	Lifespan	Rank	Country	War(s)	Limb Loss	Date of injury	Description
	Henry Paget, 1st Marquess of Anglesey	(1768–1854	Field Marshal	British Empire	French Revolutionary Wars and Napoleonic Wars (WIA)	Right leg	June 16, 1815	Towards the end of the Battle of Waterloo, Henry Paget was shot in the right leg by one of Napoleon's cannons.
	James Edward Hanger	(1843–1919)	Private	Confederate States of America	American Civil War	Left leg	June 3, 1861	After being a soldier for only two days, Hanger was shot in the leg by a Union cannonball and the leg was amputated, making him the first amputee of the war. Following the war, Hanger built his own wooden prosthetic leg and established the Hanger, Inc.
	John Wesley Powell	(1834–1902)	Major	United States	American Civil War	Right hand	April 6–7, 1862	Shortly after his marriage, Powell took part at the Battle of Shiloh and was struck in the right arm by a Minié ball. After the war, he became an acclaimed explorer and geologist.
	William Francis Bartlett	(1840–1876)	Brigadier General	United States	American Civil War	Left leg	April 24, 1862	During the Siege of Yorktown, on April 24, 1862, Bartlett (who was a captain at the time) was shot in the left knee by Confederate pickets. The wound required the amputation of his leg and Bartlett continued to fight even after his amputation.
	Francis T. Nicholls	(1834–1912)	Brigadier General	Confederate States of America	American Civil War	Left arm	May 25, 1862	During the Valley Campaign, General Nicholls was shot in the left arm and left to recover in Winchester, Virginia.
	Alfred A. Stratton	(1844–1874)	Sergeant	United States	American Civil War	Arms	June 18, 1864	The 20-year-old blacksmith lost both his arms during the Siege of Petersburg when his arms were struck with a Confederate cannonball and amputated by Mr. A. S. Coe.
	Stephen Joseph McGroarty	(1830–1870)	Colonel	United States	American Civil War	Left arm	July 20, 1864	At the Battle of Peachtree Creek on July 20, 1864, McGroarty left arm was shattered at the elbow by a minié ball in the beginning of the engagement, yet he remained with his men through the fight.

== 1914-1918 ==
Image	Name	Lifespan	Rank	Country	War(s)	Limb Loss	Date of injury	Description
	Paul Wittgenstein	(1887–1961)	Lieutenant	Austria-Hungary	World War I	Right arm	23 August – 11 September 1914	During the Battle of Galicia, Wittgenstein was shot in the elbow by Russian forces and his arm was amputated. Following the war, he became a famous left-handed pianist.
	Joseph O'Sullivan	(1897–1922)	lance corporal	British Empire	World War I	Right leg	July 31 – November 10, 1917	The Irish Republican Army volunteer fought in World War I and lost his right leg at the Battle of Passchendaele.
	Laurence Stallings	(1894–1968)	Captain	United States	World War I	Right leg	June 25, 1918	During the Battle of Belleau Wood, Stallings severely wounded his leg after he charged a German machine gun nest. He refused to have the leg amputated and it was later amputated in 1922 after he damaged it falling on ice.

== 1939-1945 ==
Image	Name	Lifespan	Rank	Country	War(s)	Limb Loss	Date of injury	Description
	Aleksey Maresyev	(1916–2001)	Colonel	Soviet Union	World War II	Legs	April 23, 1942	On 5 April 1942 his Yakovlev Yak-1 was shot down near Staraya Russa, after which he was almost captured. Despite being badly injured, he managed to return to the Soviet-controlled territory, braving blizzards and German patrol units. During his 18-day-long journey his injuries deteriorated so badly that both of his legs had to be amputated above the knee. Before the surgery he was lying on a stretcher with a sheet over his face and considered to be a hopeless case due to the extent of his injuries in addition to suffering from gangrene and blood poisoning. One doctor offered to operate on him and thereby saved him, but told him he would not lose his legs.

== 1946-1999 ==
Image	Name	Lifespan	Rank	Country	War(s)	Limb Loss	Date of injury	Description
	Max Cleland	(1942–2021)	Captain	United States	Vietnam War	Both legs and right forearm	April 8, 1968	On April 8, with a month left in his tour, Cleland was ordered to set up a radio relay station on a nearby hill. A helicopter flew him and two soldiers to the treeless top of Hill 471, east of Khe Sanh. When the helicopter landed, Cleland jumped out, followed by the two soldiers. They ducked because of the rotor wash and turned to watch the liftoff. Cleland reached down to pick up a grenade he believed had dropped off his flak jacket. It then exploded, the blast slamming him backward, shredding both his legs and his right arm.

== 2000-Present ==
Image	Name	Lifespan	Rank	Country	War(s)	Limb part	Date of injury	Description
	Eric Alva	(b. 1970)	Staff Sergeant	United States	Iraq War	Right leg	March 21, 2003	On the first day of the Iraq War, March 21, 2003, United States Marine Corps Staff Sergeant Eric Alva stepped on a landmine and lost his right leg.
	Tammy Duckworth	(b. 1968)	Lieutenant colonel	United States	Iraq War	Legs	November 12, 2004	On November 12, 2004, when the UH-60 Black Hawk helicopter she was co-piloting was hit by a rocket-propelled grenade fired by Iraqi insurgents. She was the first American female double amputee from the Iraq War.
	Gregory D. Gadson	(b. 1966)	Colonel	United States	Gulf War, Kosovo War, Iraq War (WIA) and War in Afghanistan	Legs	May 7, 2007	On the night of May 7, 2007, while returning from a memorial service for two soldiers from his brigade, he lost both his legs and severely injured his right arm to a roadside bomb in Baghdad. He became one of the first military personnel to use a next-generation powered prosthetic knee with technology to make it possible for amputees to walk with confidence and with a more natural gait.
	Andy Allen	(b. 1988)	Ranger	Northern Ireland	War in Afghanistan	Legs	2008	Allen was a Ranger in the Royal Irish Regiment, he was hit with an IED in Helmand. Following the war, he became the Ulster Unionist Party spokesperson for Communities.
	Bob Andrzejczak	(b. 1986)	Sergeant	United States	Iraq War	Left leg	2009	Andrzejczak had served in the Iraq War as a sergeant in the Army's 25th Infantry Division until his discharge following an injury from a grenade explosion which led to the amputation of his left leg in 2009. As a result, he was awarded the Purple Heart and Bronze Star; his recovery was featured on a 2009 episode of The Oprah Winfrey Show.
	Dan Crenshaw	(b.1984)	Lieutenant commander	United States	War in Afghanistan	Right eye	2012	The Scottish-American politician and Navy SEAL officer lost his eye to an IED in Helmand, Afghanistan. The explosion destroyed his right eye and damaged his left eye which was repaired with surgery. Crenshaw was awarded with the Purple Heart for his service.
