= Vengeance of Excalibur =

1991 video game

- Developer: Synergistic Software
- Publisher: Virgin Games
- Designers: Robert Clardy; Alan Clark
- Platforms: MS-DOS, Macintosh, Amiga, Atari ST
- Release: 1991
- Genre: Role-playing
- Mode: Single-player

Vengeance of Excalibur is a 1991 role-playing video game developed by Synergistic Software and distributed by Virgin Games. It is a sequel for Synergistic's 1990 title Spirit of Excalibur, set in Spain around the turn of the 10th and 11th Centuries. Vengeance of Excalibur puts the player in control of a small team of Knights of the Round Table who will seek out in Spain for the stolen items of the treasure of Camelot (the series advances the timeline of Arthurian lore 500 years past period where it is usually established).

== Plot ==
The game begins two years after Spirit of Excalibur left off: Britain has been reunited under King Constantine III, who succeeds King Arthur after the Battle of Camlann, and peacefully rules over the realm after killing Mordred's sons and their aunt, Morgan le Fay. During a stormy night a lone knight is admitted into Camelot; while Constantine converses with the stranger, the knight lets in a second figure, who subsequently transforms Constantine into a statue. They then proceed to the treasure room of the castle and steal its contents, including Arthur's mythical sword Excalibur and the recently recovered Holy Grail. The knight is also able to subdue and kidnap Nineve, the court's sorceress, second in magical power only to Merlin. With the treasures of Camelot stolen, plagues and demonic creatures roam the British country-side. Merlin is appointed acting regent of the realm while the Knights of the Round Table are dispatched in small groups to search the medieval western Europe and find a way to stop this mystic assault.

The player controls a group of knights bound for the Iberian Peninsula from Portsmouth: a witness to the assault on Camelot reveals that the knight is the rogue warrior Sir Bruce sans Pitie, and that there is evidence that indicates that he may have traveled to Spain, a country torn by the war between the Christian kingdoms of the north and the Muslim caliphates of the south, and plagued by groups of mercenary knights, violent bandits, and clannish Basques. If they manage to negotiate these hazards, the forces of the Round Table must still find and defeat Sir Bruce and his ally, the Shadow Master.

== Gameplay ==
Screenshot of a "scene level" from Vengeance of Excalibur Episode 1

Gameplay in Vengeance of Excalibur is nearly identical to its predecessor Spirit of Excalibur: the game is made up of seven episodes, each with a specific goal, usually the retrieval of one of the stolen artifacts, and a number of lesser quests that may be undertaken to complete the episode, or to enhance the powers of the player's knights. Unlike Spirit where the player had many knights under his control, in Vengeance of Excalibur he or she only has a team of four knights which are later joined by the sorceress Nineve and by other characters who temporarily join the player's team – usually to provide troops for large-scale battles. Some of the knights the player can choose from at the beginning are either returning characters from Spirit, like Sir Lancelot or Sir Bors, while the others are new and not necessarily derived from Arthurian mythology. Every character has his strong point when the game begins; for example Lancelot is the most combat-capable starting out, while Bors is the most pious. The player is also presented with the chance to import four characters from Spirit of Excalibur, bringing the total number of knights that can be chosen up to sixteen. These imported characters (which can include Lancelot and Bors) are translated into the game with most of their statistics and items intact from Spirit, which can make the game easier if they were significantly developed in the previous game.

Vengeance of Excalibur has some important differences that set it apart from that of its predecessor. The first difference relates to individual combat, which now allows for 3-versus-3 fights, as opposed to the 1-vs.-1 battles of the original game. In addition, the player can no longer manually control his fighter: there are now however three different combat styles that the player can choose for every character who is fighting (reckless/full offense, normal, and cautious/full defense). The second difference is the size of the locations the player can travel to. In Spirit of Excalibur every location usually had a few scenes, like the outside and the inside of a castle, from which the characters could move to and from. In Vengeance locations often have more than two scenes, and the characters can be directed to more than one direction in each scene. This effectively creates a larger environment for the player to explore, and it makes in-game mazes and labyrinths possible.

== Reception ==
Computer Gaming World stated that Vengeance's story was inferior to its predecessor and the final battle was disappointing, but liked the audio.

== See also ==
- Darklands
