= Probe One: The Transmitter =

1982 video game

- Publisher: Synergistic Software
- Programmers: Lloyd D. Ollmann, Jr.
- Platform: Atari 8-bit
- Release: 1982
- Genre: Graphic adventure

Probe One: The Transmitter is a graphic adventure game published by Synergistic Software for Atari 8-bit computers in 1982.

== Gameplay ==
Probe One: The Transmitter is a game in which the player searches the research center of a space colony for a transmitter, while avoiding droids.

== Reception ==
David Stone reviewed the game for Computer Gaming World, and stated that "Probe One will appeal most to adventurers who prefer path-finding to solving riddles and puzzles. It is billed as the first in a series of science fiction adventures. It's not a bad start, but like all else in this universe, it could have been done better."
