= LA Law: The Computer Game =

1992 video game

- Developer: Synergistic Software
- Publisher: Capstone Software
- Platform: MS-DOS
- Release: 1992
- Genres: Adventure, interactive movie,
- Mode: Single-player

LA Law: The Computer Game is a video game developed by Synergistic Software for MS-DOS and compatible operating systems and published by Capstone Software in 1992. The game is based on the TV show L.A. Law.

== Gameplay ==
The object of the game is to solve a case. Cases are solved in a point-and-click interface. The other goal is that prove worthy for a law firm. Information about the case must be gathered. When ready, the case is taken to court. During court, there is a choice of whom to speak to and which evidence to give. The first such case is called "The Wrathful Race" involving a man accused of vehicular homicide. The judge may, for example, allow a continuance in order for the defense to gather evidence, but 9 hours (this is simulated elapsed time and not actual elapsed time) may be the maximum time allowed to review evidence and interview the widow, the medical examiner, a private investigator, etc. before the case will be brought to court. The judge will typically not allow the player, acting as the defense, to object to a statement by the prosecution if he or she is permitted to establish the evidence and the date and time the alleged crime was committed. A defense composed merely of an assertion by the defendant that the victim was a bad driver and died due to his own negligence, is usually insufficient, because it does not refute that the defendant knew about the accident and willingly left the scene.

The instruction manual which came with the game also advised users on what numbers to call in order to gather the necessary evidence in the allotted time.

== Reviews ==
- Just Games Retro
- Pelit
