= Air Cavalry =

1995 video game

- North American cover art
- Developer: Synergistic Software
- Publishers: NA: Cybersoft; EU: GameTek
- Programmers: Alan Clarke; Steve Coleman; Christopher Phillips
- Composers: Christopher Barker; Craig Utterback
- Platform: Super NES
- Release: NA: June 1995; EU: 1995
- Genres: Flight simulation Shoot 'em up
- Modes: Single-player, multiplayer

Air Cavalry is a flight simulation video game developed by Synergistic Software. It was released by Cybersoft and GameTek for the Super NES in 1995.

== Gameplay ==
Gameplay screenshot.

In the game, players control an advanced helicopter gunship. Flying above multiple types of terrain, players have to complete a number of objectives using different types of helicopters with different uses for each. Players can select from three theatres of operations with six or more objectives that increase in difficulty. Players can also practice in the training mission.

== Reception ==
Reception

Review scores
Publication	Score
Computer and Video Games	47/100
Electronic Gaming Monthly	5.875/10
Game Players	52%
Next Generation	2/5
Ação Games	3/5

Air Cavalry received generally mixed reviews. The four reviewers of Electronic Gaming Monthly commented that the low supply of ammunition and the unfailing accuracy of enemy fire make the game unpleasantly difficult, and that the Mode 7 sequences look poor. They nonetheless assessed the game as "decent", and said that enthusiasts of military games would find it very appealing.

GamePro, in contrast, praised the Mode 7 sequences and remarked that "Easy targeting and non-moving enemies makes this a better game for rookies than veterans." While they criticized the slow-moving helicopter and simplistic gameplay compared to the Strike series, they concluded that "if you're looking for a solid shooter, Air Cavalry comes to the rescue." Next Generation reviewed the game, and stated that "Success is as much of luck as skill, which makes it frustrating as well as overly repetitive."
