= Battleship (1993 video game) =

1993 video game

- Developers: Mindscape UK (NES); NGM Productions (Game Gear)
- Publisher: Mindscape
- Programmers: Henrik Markanian (NES); Gil Espeche (Game Gear)
- Composer: Mark Knight
- Series: Battleship
- Platforms: Nintendo Entertainment System, Game Gear
- Release: 1993
- Genre: Turn-based strategy
- Mode: Single-player

Battleship is a 1993 Nintendo Entertainment System and Game Gear video game based on the eponymous board game.

== History ==
This game was mentioned in Nintendo Power. Other versions of Battleship, include Battleships for Amiga, Atari ST, Commodore 64 and ZX Spectrum, Battleship for CD-i, Battleship for Game Boy and Game Boy Color, and others for PC and mobile phones. A sequel appeared on the Super NES and Sega Genesis, Super Battleship.

== Gameplay ==
The object is to sink the opponent's fleet without them sinking the player's fleet first. In this updated version, both the player and the computer get extra firepower from military aircraft and support weapons. Some scenarios resume an earlier game and overcome a bleak prospect.

The game has eight levels with five battles each and the player must win 40 battles to clear the game. After winning a battle, a password will be provided. New weapons are added at each level.
