= Escape from Arcturus =

1981 video game

- Publisher: Synergistic Software
- Platform: Apple II
- Release: 1981

Escape from Arcturus is a video game for the Apple II published in 1981 by Synergistic Software. It consists of two games which can be played independently or one after the other: Space Fortress, which is a clone of the arcade video game Space Zap, and Escape.

== Gameplay ==
Escape from Arcturus is a game in which the player can either try to survive as long as possible while defending against unstoppable hostile alien bases, or evacuate inhabitants from the planet while aliens attack.

== Reception ==
Bob Boyd reviewed the game for Computer Gaming World, and stated that "The high score for each mode is saved on disk which is a nice feature. The graphics are good in the "Fortress" mode and outstanding in the "Escape" mode. As current arcade games go, however, Escape from Arcturus tends to be a little simplistic."
