= Apventure to Atlantis =

1982 video game

- Publisher: Synergistic Software
- Platform: Apple II
- Release: 1982

Apventure to Atlantis is the sequel to Odyssey: The Compleat Apventure written by Bob Clardy for the Apple II and published by Synergistic Software in 1982.

== Gameplay ==
This is a sequel to Odyssey: The Compleat Apventure whose story picks up with the player as ruler of this island and updates the format of the game to include internal areas displayed in the form of the then-current Mystery House game, and also incorporated a parser that allowed the use of text adventure-style commands.

== Reception ==
Softalk said "Atlantis is a worthy successor to its progenitor; preserving many of the original's noblest achievements and adding refinements that in turn promise even greater things in future Apventures."

Creative Computing said "The game has sound, color, animation, excitement, and – for when you're really stuck – a hint sheet. If you find static adventures boring, try this one."

The 1984 Software Encyclopedia from Electronic Games rated the game an 8 out of 10 and said "Colorful, animated visuals decorate this entertaining cross between action adventures and arcade-style games."
