= Odyssey: The Compleat Apventure =

1980 video game

- The title screen, showing the intentionally misspelled title.
- Developer: Synergistic Software
- Publisher: Synergistic Software
- Programmer: Robert Clardy
- Platform: Apple II
- Release: NA: 1980
- Genre: RPG

Odyssey: The Compleat Apventure is a video game written by Robert Clardy and released by Synergistic Software in 1980. It was created for the Apple II platform and is considered one of the first microcomputer-based role-playing video games. The title was intentionally misspelled; Apventure is a reference to the Apple computer while "Compleat" is simply an Archaic spelling of the word "complete" meant to match the feel and setting of the game.

A forerunner of Akalabeth and Ultima, Odyssey was a multi-part adventure game that placed the player in the role of the leader of an army who sets out to vanquish the Caliph, an evil wizard. Elements of Dungeons & Dragons can be found within the game, which combines elements of two earlier games written by Clardy: Dungeon Campaign and Wilderness Campaign.

== Game overview ==
In the game, the player is tasked with recovering a magic orb wielded years ago by the High One and restoring it to his fortress; since the High One was defeated, the Caliph has seized power and installed himself in the fortress of the High One. In order to save the human race, the player also must defeat the Caliph and earn the right to be the next High One.

The game features several major sections. Except for the endgame section, the game play is presented in a top-down map format with limited animation and sound effects.

=== Part 1 ===
The game starts on an uncharted island in the fictional Sargalo Sea, where the player and a small party of recruits have to search the island for castles, ruins and temples, wherein they can find randomly placed treasure and valuable magical items. Along the way, the game generates random encounters with monsters, warriors, rogues, and wizards. Some wizards and warlocks encountered might be kindly disposed towards the player and provide magical items, while others may attack on sight. Similarly, some groups of rogues and warriors encountered might choose to join the player's group rather than fight. This segment is similar to the earlier Synergistic Software game Wilderness Campaign.

Combat is conducted using a random number generator - the party with the higher number during a round inflicts damage on the enemy, with damage gauged by the number of people or creatures killed. When a group reaches zero members, the team is defeated. The player's "roll" is determined by the number of recruits, their strength and experience, and the type and quantity of weapons and armor carried.

For the player, maintaining a large army is necessary in order to continue to carry gold, treasure, and necessities such as weapons. The fewer recruits in a party, the fewer items that can be carried. Recruits can be added to the team by having groups of warriors and rogues agree to join; a more expensive way of adding recruits is to purchase contracts that periodically become available for sale. Three randomly scattered towns allow the player to purchase food (which must be replenished) and goods such as lockpicks that allow access to some structures. The type and quantity of goods available for purchase are randomly generated. The player also encounters the occasional caravan from which goods can be purchased - or, the player may choose to attack the caravan; if the caravan is defeated, the team receives the spoils which consists of a number of random items that may or may not be useful.

The towns are not explored. Instead, the player is automatically taken to the market where bartering for goods occurs. The player can choose to pay the full price, or can negotiate for a lower fee. Depending on the player's charisma level (set at the start of the game), the merchants may agree to charge less, or they may get upset at a low bid and remove an item from sale completely (which can be hazardous to the player if the item removed for sale happens to be badly needed food). Merchants are replenished after the player leaves the town and has an encounter of some sort. Caravans work the same ways as towns, except as they are randomly encountered one has only a single chance to strike a deal. Occasionally, huts are encountered in the wilderness where the player can gamble a (usually large) amount of gold for an alleged magic item that may or may not be any good.

Gold is accumulated from chests and other sources, including magical scrolls; the higher the party's wisdom score is, the more gold is obtained from a scroll.

The opening gameplay screen from Odyssey. The purple crosses represent towns. The player's avatar can be seen top-centre.

Travel around the island can be slow and dangerous, and items purchased by the player may be necessary to pass through obstacles or avoid loss of recruits. (For example, if the player has a shovel, recruits can be rescued from avalanches and cave-ins; a machete may be needed to pass through dense jungle; an amulet is needed to cure swamp fever, etc.) If a player is lucky, a magic carpet might be found in a chest or be obtained from a friendly wizard or warlock. This allows quick travel across the island; riding a magic carpet avoids monster battles but also skips over buildings and ruins that may contain treasure. Horses can also be obtained with a similar effect; however, the player must have a sufficient quantity of horses to carry the team, while only one magic carpet is required.

The ultimate goal of the island section of the game is to collect enough gold to purchase a ship, which is usually available only at "Port Karre", the town closest to the northwest corner of the island, and also to collect ample magical objects and other items (mirrors, wooden planks, even a monkey or two) which will be needed later in the game. The game does not indicate how many or what particular objects might be needed (due to the random nature); it's up to the player to determine if a sufficient variety and quantity of items has been obtained before setting sail. After embarking, the player cannot return to the island.

=== Part 2 ===
The game then becomes a sea expedition, with the player navigating their vessel between several islands. Among hazards that must be dealt with: pirate attacks, unpredictable winds, whirlpools, scurvy among the crew, falling off the edge of the world, and rotting sails. How well the player is able to cope with these hazards depends upon how well stocked the player's team became on the main island. (Once Part 2 begins, the island can no longer be accessed.) Merchant vessels may also be encountered - with the player having the same options as with caravans, attack or barter. After leaving the island, this is the only easy way to obtain necessary items such as fruit, spare sails, and weapons (however the player is no longer required to be continually stocked with regular food). The group may also encounter pirates, whirlpools, birds, and other hazards that can kill men and damage the ship.

The map of islands in the Sargalo Sea in which you navigate your ship consists of a ring of islands around the perimeter of the screen. Your ship starts out next to the island you just left (in the lower right of the screen) while "Lapour", the island now held by the Caliph (your goal) is in the upper left. You may land on other islands to stock up on food and resources but for the most part these islands are not fully explorable as the first one was, and serve only as places to stock up on supplies by displaying a few lines of text after you land (with one exception—see below). Navigation is a complex scheme, as you are at the mercy of wind and currents (and whether the vessel has any intact sails left) and you cannot navigate directly as you can in early Ultima titles. You must set the sails in different directions in order to catch the wind, and raise and lower anchor to start and stop your ship. Hazards include running aground if the player weighs anchor too close to shore, being caught in a whirlpool which may destroy the ship or destroy its sails, scurvy among the crew, calm winds (which is harmless to the ship but prevents any progress until the winds start up again) and falling off the edge of the world if the ship gets too close to the edge of the map.

During this segment of the game, the goal is to discover a magical orb and take it to the Caliph's island in order to defeat him and become the ruler of the land. The orb can be discovered in one of two ways. While sailing, the player may encounter the god Argorion who will tell the player where a great treasure may be found (the player's ability to find the treasure will depend upon whether he/she was able to obtain a sextant during the island expedition). If you sail to the proper coordinates in the sea and search, you will find the item. The other way is that one of the islands will randomly contain a blocky, lo-res graphical dungeon (somewhat similar to the Clardys' earlier Dungeon Campaign game), which are the caverns beneath the "Temple of Mordril", whose corridors reveal themselves to you and are added to the map as you wander through them. The team runs into random hazard encounters along the way (such as cave-ins, poison gas, and wandering monsters), as well as the occasional treasure, and eventually finds the magical orb. (In order to access this dungeon, however, you must first tithe a magical item, provided you have any left.)

Regardless how the orb is obtained, the next goal is to travel to "Lapour", the island at the top left corner of the sea map, which is the Caliph's island.

=== Part 3 (endgame) ===
During the final segment of the game, the screen returns to a view of an island, similar to that in part one except that there is a large castle drawn in the middle of the screen which the player approaches from the bottom. Although it looks similar, gameplay does not consist of free movement as it did on the first island. Instead the player advances upon the former High One's fortress, now the castle of the Caliph, a series of three overcoming randomized obstacles placed in his/her way such as walls, giant pits, etc. (like most obstacles in the game, these are described in text rather than actually seen). The player's ability to get past these obstacles with minimal damage/loss of men depends upon what items have been kept in inventory. Seemingly innocuous items found on the main island early in the game such as mirrors and monkeys which served no purpose, are often essential to overcoming the obstacles here. (For example, a monkey is needed to unlock a door; mirrors can protect against damage from Medusa). If the team makes it to the castle, a great (off-screen) battle ensues, which the player invariably wins so long as the team has a fair number of men. The game ends with a tally of how many creatures the player's team killed, how large the team became, etc.

== Sequel ==
There is a sequel to Odyssey: The Compleat Apventure called Apventure to Atlantis whose story picks up with the player as ruler of this island and updates the format of the game to include internal areas displayed in the form of the then-current Mystery House game, and also incorporated a parser that allowed the use of text adventure-style commands.

== Graphics and technology ==
Although primitive by today's standards, Odyssey was considered cutting-edge for its time, making use of the Apple II's two graphics modes (high-resolution and low-resolution), and text. The game was written in Integer BASIC and was one of the first microcomputer games to be created using multiple programs, requiring floppy disc activation and access mid-game. Prior to this, most games were self-contained, single programs; Odyssey was split into several different programs and took up an entire disk. The game also made use of rudimentary sound effects.

This feature, however, led to a way in which the player could cheat: by removing the disk when the computer required access, a cursor flashes on screen; typing "GOTO 770" would fool the computer into thinking that the player had just opened up a treasure box. This is one of the earliest known examples of a cheat code. In addition, the use of Integer BASIC led to some overflow errors when the player had acquired more than 127 people or 39 items of the same type.

The game's title screen art, a line-drawing of a dragon, was also used for the title screen of another 1980 adventure game release, Eamon.

== Reception ==
BYTE in 1980 called Odyssey "an engrossing game", stating that it had "the best use of color graphics in a game for the Apple that I have seen". The magazine approved of the randomly generated environments and large number of possible encounters and outcomes, and concluded that both new and experienced adventurers would enjoy the game. Deirdre L. Maloy reviewed the game for Computer Gaming World, stating that "Odyssey was the program that sold me on an Apple computer. At that time, the graphics were the best I had seen on a computer game. Odyssey and its predecessors, 'Wilderness Campaign' and 'Dungeon Campaign', are still very good programs, although Odyssey is undoubtedly the best (as well as the most time-consuming) of the three". Softalk called it "a fun and canny fantasy game" in 1980.

Scorpia of Computer Gaming World in 1991 described the trio of Synergistic Software games (Wilderness Campaign, Odyssey, and Atlantis) collectively as pioneering computer role-playing games, stating that they offered on a 48K Apple II several wilderness environments; multiple forms of transportation, including sailing by the wind; non-hostile NPCs; a variety of areas to explore; and region-specific monsters. In 1993 she wrote the three games were "some of the finest of the early CRPGs", with "an astonishing range of features", especially for a 48K Apple II.
