= Wilderness Campaign (video game) =

1979 video game

- Typical game screen; the green elements are randomly placed while the white elements are terrain and the White Mage's fortress
- Developer: Synergistic Software
- Publisher: Synergistic Software
- Programmer: Robert Clardy
- Platform: Apple II (48k)
- Release: NA: 1979
- Genre: CRPG

Wilderness Campaign is a role-playing video game written by Robert Clardy and released in 1979 by Clardy's company Synergistic Software. It was created for the Apple II platform and is considered one of the first microcomputer-based role-playing video games.

Clardy incorporated themes from Dungeons & Dragons into the game, which later was modified and included as the opening quest of Odyssey: The Compleat Apventure (1980), a multi-part video game also written by Clardy.

== Game overview ==
In the game, the player explores the Kingdom of Draconia with a party of unnamed adventurers, seeking a magical weapon from the Sanctuary of the White Mage to overthrow the Great Necromancer. During their exploration, players will enter abandoned ruins, battling monsters and hostile citizens and collecting gold to pay their mercenaries and purchase additional resources from villages, including food and upgraded weapons and armor. They also may seek shelter in friendly castles, whose rulers may bestow additional gold and adventurers. Other items the player can purchase may help the party cross difficult terrain.

== Development and release ==
Robert Clardy began work on Wilderness Campaign in December 1978. After it was finished, it was packaged with Clardy's earlier game, Dungeon Campaign, for commercial release by Synergistic Software.

== Legacy ==
Vince Erato incorporated the adventuring and resource management mechanics of Wilderness Campaign into the electronic board game Dark Tower.
