= Spirit of Excalibur =

1990 role-playing video game

- Developer: Synergistic Software
- Publisher: Virgin Mastertronic
- Director: Robert Clardy
- Programmer: Alan B. Clark
- Artists: Rob Landeros; Robert Stein III
- Composers: Christopher Barker (PC); Mark Riley (Amiga)
- Platforms: MS-DOS, Amiga, Atari ST, Apple IIGS, Macintosh, CDTV
- Release: 1990
- Genre: Role-playing game
- Mode: Single-player

Spirit of Excalibur is a 1990 role-playing game developed by Synergistic Software and published by Virgin Mastertronic for MS-DOS, Amiga, Atari ST, Commodore CDTV, Apple IIGS and Macintosh. The player controls a host of characters with the goal of uniting Sub-Roman Britain under a single king and defending the kingdom. The game was followed by the sequel Vengeance of Excalibur in 1991.

== Gameplay ==
DOS screenshot showing a portion of Britain on the map screen

Screenshot of a "scene level": a group of knights of the Round Table (left) meets some evil knights (right)

The geographical setting for Spirit of Excalibur is a depiction of actual southern England with its cities, castles, villages, churches and other locations scattered throughout the land. The player starts by controlling a single character, Lord Constantine III of Britain, but as the game proceeds he will be able to control many other knights and the armies they lead, including King Arthur's best friend and magician Merlin. All action takes place at two different levels: a so-called "map level" and a "scene level".

As its name implies, the "map level" shows a multi-screen overview map of Britain, which the player can explore by scrolling. The computer- and player-controlled characters move across the map from place to place and are usually marked by a shield icon with the knight or character's own insignia. To solve the puzzles and mysteries which allow him to proceed through the game, the player must visit key locations and interact with various characters, sometimes enlisting their help and sometimes fighting them. These types of action take place at the "scene level".

When two different groups meet, the player is shown a scene depicting a side view of all characters present at that location. Dialogs, individual combat, exchanges of objects, and requests for information all take place at the scene level. During the fights on this level, one of the player controlled characters combats one of the enemies. The fight ends when all the elements of a group are dead or have withdrawn. The player can choose whether to activate an automatic control or fight manually and he can also have any of his characters use an object or a magician cast a spell. Individual combat ensues between characters who are not supported by an army, but upon a meeting between two hostile armies a specific combat screen opens. If the player has control over one of the two sides, he can issue commands to his units, for example ordering a group of soldiers to charge the enemy, some knights to flank the adversary of have one of the Knights of the Round Table use an object.

All characters have specific characteristics listed in a status display: numerical values identify the character health status, his/her magical or combat abilities, the strength of his/her defences and the nobility and faith levels. While combat skill or health level are quite self-explanatory, nobility and faith play a slightly subtle role: these virtues are fundamental to each character, so much that extremely low levels of nobility or faith will have the specific knight turn evil and the player will lose control over such character. The player can lower a knight's nobility value for example by committing inappropriate actions for a noble (e.g. attacking innocent people), but he can also enhance such value by committing good deeds like helping a damsel in distress. Faith values can be altered quite similarly: in presence of supernatural creatures or tools faith can be reduced, but having a character spend some time in a church will make his/her faith stronger.

== Plot ==
As the title suggests, the game is based on Arthurian legend. Both fictional and historical sources are used to recreate the atmosphere of the age of King Arthur and the Knights of the Round Table, and to draw out characters' names, history and relationships. The game's sources include medieval works such as Thomas Malory's Le Morte d'Arthur, modern ones such as Marion Zimmer Bradley's The Mists of Avalon, and a number of historical treatises on Arthur of the late 1980s. The game is set in the year 539, shortly after the Battle of Camlann at which King Arthur has been mortally wounded by the traitorous Mordred. Britain urgently needs a new king who can reunite its scattered realms and bring the Round Table back to its former glory. Arthur left a successor in the person of Lord Constantine the Crown Regent.

Spirit of Excalibur consists of five different episodes each with its main quest and a number of lesser ones to solve both to achieve the episode main goal and the game aim of reuniting Britain. During the game the player first leads Constantine to Camelot where he can claim Arthur's throne, then gathers forces to defeat both the Saxon invaders and the sons of Mordred who seek to usurp the throne just as their father did. As the game progresses, enchanted beings threaten Constantine's kingdom and the player must find the magical means to stop these menaces as well, up to the final confrontation with Arthur's half-sister Morgan le Fay who is dabbling in dark arts. The game is won if the player can unite all the fragmented kingdoms of Britain and successfully keep Constantine alive past the last episode.

== Reception ==
Reception

Review scores
Publication	Score
Zero	83% (Amiga)
Dragon	4/5 (DOS)
Amiga Action	70% (Amiga)
Amiga Power	62% (Amiga); 2/5 (Amiga)

Computer Gaming World praised Excalibur's VGA graphics and described it as a "technical wonder", but criticized the documentation and game for not explaining the goal. The DOS version of the game received 4 out of 5 stars in Dragon. Amiga reviews were varied from average to very positive and included the scores of 70% in Amiga Action, 62% in Amiga Power, and 83% in Zero.

Jim Trunzo reviewed Spirit of Excalibur in White Wolf #24 (Dec./Jan., 1990), rating it a 4 out of 5 and stated that "Fans of the Arthurian legends will thrill to the authenticity and feel of the game. All gamers will love the challenge and presentation of Spirit of Excalibur."

== Sequel ==
The sequel was developed also by Synergistic Software and published by Virgin Games for the Amiga, Atari ST, DOS and Macintosh computers in 1991. It begins after Morgan has been slain and all her evil magic was undone, which also means the demon lord Shadowmaster was set free and becomes the powerful new main antagonist.
