= Front Page Sports: Football Pro '98 =

1997 video game

Front Page Sports: Football Pro 98
- Developer: Synergistic Software
- Publisher: Sierra On-Line
- Platform: Windows
- Release: November 1997

Front Page Sports: Football Pro 98 is a 1997 video game from Sierra On-Line. The game features Dan Marino as the star athlete on the box.

== Gameplay ==
The gameplay in Front Page Sports: Football Pro '98 builds on this series, and retains the simulation features from earlier entries like detailed coaching profiles, robust play design tools, and the ability to guide a team across seasons through drafts, trades, and free agency. League and team management menus are streamlined with a revamped interface. Internet play is expanded, with improved chat and arcade-style options, plus utilities like a schedule maker to recreate real NFL seasons. Players in the action mode have only two joystick buttons. New rosters, logos, stadium artwork, and weather details are included.

== Reception ==
Reception

Review scores
Publication	Score
Computer Gaming World	3/5
Computer Games Magazine	1.5/5
GameSpot	6.3/10
PC Player	63/100
PC Games	46%

GameSpot gave the game a score of 5.9 out of 10' stating: "For gamers who revel in the challenges of play design, draft and trade decisions, game plans, and even practice-camp priorities, FPS: FP '98 is still the only game in town. Whether or not a slightly improved version of "the only game in town" is worth $25 or $30, though, is up to you."

The game was the 8th best-selling football game from the January to October 1997 period according to the Hartford Courant.
