= Dungeon Campaign =

1978 video game

- The startup screen
- Developer: Synergistic Software
- Publisher: Synergistic Software
- Programmer: Robert Clardy
- Platform: Apple II (16k)
- Release: NA: 1978
- Genre: Adventure

Dungeon Campaign is a video game written by Robert Clardy and released in 1978, later published commercially by Clardy's company Synergistic Software in 1979. It was created for the Apple II platform and is derived from Gary J. Shannon's Dragon Maze. Dungeon Campaign is considered one of the first microcomputer-based adventure video games.

Clardy incorporated themes from Dungeons & Dragons into the game, which later was included as a side quest within Odyssey: The Compleat Apventure, a multi-part adventure / role-playing video game also written by Clardy and released in 1980.

== Game overview ==
In the game, the player uses the keyboard to navigate a party of thirteen adventurers, including one elf and one dwarf, through the dreaded Totmacher Castle dungeon consisting of four randomly generated maze levels, which are connected by pits and stairways. The player collects treasures as they progress through the dungeon and may encounter traps and other menaces, including monsters and sorcerers. The sole exit is on the lowest level. The elf and dwarf are included to warn the player of nearby traps and to map the dungeon as it is explored, respectively; the other anonymous adventurers provide a hit point system to keep track of damage incurred from the various traps and other hostile characters.

Although reaching the exit is relatively easy, the game uses the treasures collected during the adventure to provide a final score.

== Development and release ==
Shortly after purchasing his first computer, Robert Clardy began modifying the code for Dungeon Maze, an Integer BASIC program published in the Apple II Reference Manual (1978) which included a routine to randomly generate a maze. Clardy added multiple levels and a party system.

Initially, Clardy gave away copies of the game to members of his local user group, the Apple Puget Sound Program Library Exchange; their enthusiastic reception encouraged him to add more features and, after completing a follow-up game using the Apple II's high-resolution mode, Wilderness Campaign, in December 1978, packaged both games together for a commercial release under Synergistic Software, the company he founded with his wife, Ann Dickens Clardy.

== Reception ==
Gregg Williams reviewed Dungeon Campaign in 1980 for Byte, calling it one of his favorite games for Apple II.
