= Mike Sullivan (American football coach) =

American football player and coach (born 1967)

Las Vegas Raiders
- Title: Quarterbacks coach

Personal information
- Born: January 28, 1967 (age 59); Santa Maria, California, U.S.

Career information
- High school: Cabrillo (CA)
- College: Army

Career history

Coaching
- Humboldt State (1993) Graduate assistant; Army (1995–1996); Assistant linebackers coach (1995); Outside linebackers coach (1996); Youngstown State (1997–1998) Defensive backs coach; Army (1999–2000) Defensive backs coach; Ohio (2001) Defensive backs coach; Jacksonville Jaguars (2002–2003); Defensive quality control coordinator (2002); Offensive assistant (2003); New York Giants (2004–2011); Wide receivers coach (2004–2009); Quarterbacks coach (2010–2011); Tampa Bay Buccaneers (2012–2013) Offensive coordinator; New York Giants (2015–2017); Quarterbacks coach (2015); Offensive coordinator (2016–2017); Denver Broncos (2018) Quarterbacks coach; Pittsburgh Steelers (2021–2024); Quarterbacks coach (2021–2023); Senior offensive assistant (2024); Las Vegas Raiders (2026–present) Quarterbacks coach

Operations
- Army (2020) Director of recruiting

Awards and highlights
- 2× Super Bowl champion (XLII, XLVI); NCAA Division I-AA national champion (1997)
- Coaching profile at Pro Football Reference

Mike Sullivan (born January 28, 1967) is an American professional football coach who is the quarterbacks coach for the Las Vegas Raiders of the National Football League (NFL).

== Early life ==
Sullivan grew up mostly in Southern California and graduated from Cabrillo H.S. in Lompoc, CA in 1985. He then attended the U.S. Military Academy in West Point, NY where he was a two-year letterman in football as a defensive back, and graduated in 1989. He was commissioned as an Infantry Officer upon graduation, later attending the Army Airborne, Ranger, and Air Assault Schools before serving in the 25th Infantry Division.

== Coaching career ==
=== New York Giants (2004–2011) ===
==== Quarterbacks coach (2004–2011) ====
Sullivan served as the Giants' quarterbacks coach where his coaching was cited as a major reason for Eli Manning's success in his early seasons. He was the main reason for Eli Manning's historic 2010 season. Manning set franchise records with 339 completions and a 62.9 completion percentage, as well as his second season with over 4,000 yards, but also threw a then career-high 25 interceptions.

He remained on the staff as the quarterbacks coach in 2011, coaching Eli Manning to perhaps his greatest statistical season. Manning threw for a career-high 4,933 yards, 29 touchdowns with 16 interceptions, and had a completion percentage of over 60% for the fourth year in a row with Mike Sullivan as his position coach. The Giants would go on to win Super Bowl XLVI against the New England Patriots 21–17, with Eli Manning being named Super Bowl MVP under Sullivan's coaching.

During his tenure as wide receivers coach, Sullivan is credited with helping develop Plaxico Burress, Hakeem Nicks, Steve Smith, Mario Manningham, and others.

Sullivan also gave WR Victor Cruz the idea to do the “Salsa” dance, which became a staple of his NFL Career.

=== Tampa Bay Buccaneers (2012–2014) ===
On February 10, 2012, Sullivan was hired as the Tampa Bay Buccaneers' offensive coordinator. On December 31, 2012, NFL.com reported that Sullivan will be interviewed by the Chicago Bears for the head coaching position after Lovie Smith was fired.

In 2012, the Buccaneers had their best offense in years, with Josh Freeman then setting a Franchise record for most passing yards in a single season. The Buccaneers ranked 9th in the NFL in Total Yards.

Under Sullivan, WR Vincent Jackson set a then Franchise record for most receiving yards in a season with 1,385. Jackson also had back-to-back 1,000 yard seasons.

On December 30, 2013, the Buccaneers parted ways with their entire staff.

=== Return to the Giants (2015–2017) ===
==== Quarterbacks coach (2015) ====
On December 31, 2014, Sullivan was re-hired as the Giants quarterback coach, reuniting with his former team and quarterback, Eli Manning. Sullivan replaced Danny Langsdorf, who left to take the offensive coordinator job at Nebraska.

==== Offensive Coordinator (2016–2017) ====
On January 14, 2016, Sullivan was promoted to offensive coordinator with the departure of former Giants head coach Tom Coughlin, and the hiring of former offensive coordinator Ben McAdoo.

In 2016, under Sullivan’s tutelage, Odell Beckham Jr. had 101 receptions, 1,367 yards and 10 touchdowns. The Giants made it to the playoffs, but lost to the Packers in the Wild Card round.

=== Denver Broncos (2018) ===
On January 4, 2018, Sullivan was named as the quarterbacks coach of the Denver Broncos, taking over for interim QB coach Klint Kubiak. Following the end of the Broncos season, he was not retained by newly-hired head coach Vic Fangio.

In 2018 under Sullivan, QB Case Keenum completed 62.3% of his passes and had a career high 3,890 yards.

=== Pittsburgh Steelers (2021–2024) ===
On February 4, 2021, Sullivan was hired by the Steelers as quarterbacks coach. After the firing of offensive coordinator Matt Canada on November 21, 2023, Sullivan was designated as the team's primary play-caller for the remainder of the season, with running backs coach Eddie Faulkner taking over as interim offensive coordinator.

Sullivan coached Ben Roethlisberger in his final season in which he threw for 3,740 yards and 22 touchdowns.

=== Las Vegas Raiders (2026–present) ===
On March 24, 2026, Sullivan was hired by the Las Vegas Raiders as their quarterbacks coach under head coach Klint Kubiak.

== Administrative career ==
On March 19, 2020, Sullivan returned to West Point as the football team's Director of Recruiting.

== Personal life ==
Sullivan is a purple belt in Brazilian Jiu Jitsu. He also graduated from U.S. Army Ranger School. He is a 1989 graduate of the United States Military Academy and classmate of Gregory D. Gadson.

Sullivan is of Mexican descent.
