= Synergistic Software =

American video game developer (1978–1999)

- Industry: Video games
- Founded: 1978; 48 years ago
- Founder: Robert Clardy; Ann Dickens Clardy
- Defunct: 1999; 27 years ago
- Fate: Closed
- Headquarters: Seattle, United States
- Parent: Sierra On-Line (1996–1999)

Synergistic Software was a video game developer based in Seattle. Founded in 1978, the company published some of the earliest available games and applications for the Apple II family of computers. They continued developing games for various platforms into the late 1990s.

== History ==
After graduating from Rice University in 1974 with degrees in Electrical Engineering and Mathematical Science, Robert (Bob) Clardy was hired by Boeing as an electrical engineer at the Johnson Space Center, then moved to Seattle in 1977 with his wife Ann. Bob Clardy first was exposed to personal home computers at that time, following the releases of the Apple II and Tandy TRS-80, both in 1977. He purchased an upgraded (16 Kb) Apple II in 1978 and began modifying the code for Dragon Maze, an Integer BASIC program written by Gary J. Shannon and published in the Apple II Reference Manual (1978). Shannon's Dragon Maze randomly generated a maze which the player would then have to navigate and escape while being chased by a dragon.

Synergistic was founded in 1978 by Bob and Ann Dickens Clardy; according to them, Ann's father named the company. The modifications to Dragon Maze became the basis for Synergistic's first commercial program, the Dungeons & Dragons-inspired game Dungeon Campaign (1978). Together, the Clardys developed and marketed Dungeon Campaign and its successor Wilderness Campaign (1979), which originally were sold together on one diskette or cassette. In January 1980, Bob began to write Odyssey: The Compleat Apventure (1980), building on the themes and gameplay of the two earlier Campaign games. Odyssey was exhibited at the Fifth West Coast Computer Faire, where Bob's original Apple II was stolen.

In Dungeon Campaign, the player explores four randomly generated maze levels with a party of fifteen adventurers, gathering as much gold as possible while avoiding traps and the guardian of each level. Gregg Williams reviewed it in 1980 for Byte, calling it one of his favorite games for Apple II. Wilderness Campaign, which added resource management to an adventure set in the "Kingdom of Draconia", is credited with inspiring the gameplay of the 1981 electronic board game Dark Tower.

Synergistic also published several business applications, including a word processor, graphics utility (Higher Graphics, 1979), and a simple database program called The Modifiable Database. Modifiable Database grew from an outside commission which Clardy had taken to write a simple database program. Synergistic hired its first full-time employee in March 1981, a programmer named Mike Branham, followed by Bob's younger brother Will, later that year, to handle marketing. Also in 1981, Synergistic moved from Bob and Ann's basement into an office space, followed by a move in 1982 to a larger office in Renton, Washington.

Synergistic was acquired by Sierra On-Line in 1996. They maintained their identity as an independent development group within Sierra until the studio was closed on February 22, 1999.

== Software ==
Campaign-Adventure series

1. Dungeon Campaign (1978)
2. Wilderness Campaign (1979)
3. Odyssey: The Compleat Apventure (1980)
4. Apventure to Atlantis (1982)

World Builders engine series

1. War in Middle Earth (1988)
2. Spirit of Excalibur (1990)
3. Vengeance of Excalibur (1991)
4. Conan: The Cimmerian (1991)
5. Warriors of Legend (1993)

Non-games

- Higher Text II (1980)
- Data Reporter (1981)

Other games

- Escape from Arcturus (1981)
- Bolo (1982)
- Crisis Mountain (1982)
- Probe One: The Transmitter (1982)
- Microbe (1983)
- The Fool's Errand (1986), MS-DOS port
- Pitstop II (1984), Atari 8-bit port
- Thexder (1985), MS-DOS port
- Rockford (1988)
- SideWinder (1988)
- Silpheed (1988), MS-DOS & Apple IIGS ports
- The Third Courier (1989)
- Low Blow (1990)
- LA Law: The Computer Game (1992)
- The Beverly Hillbillies (1993)
- Homey D. Clown (1993)
- Super Battleship (1993)
- Spectre (1994)
- Carrier Aces (1995)
- Air Cavalry (1995)
- Thexder 95 (1995)
- Front Page Sports: Football Pro '97 (1996)
- Front Page Sports: Football Pro '98 (1997)
- Triple Play 97 (1996)
- Birthright - The Gorgon's Alliance (1997)
- Diablo: Hellfire (1997)
