= Eddie Faulkner =

American gridiron football player and coach (born 1977)

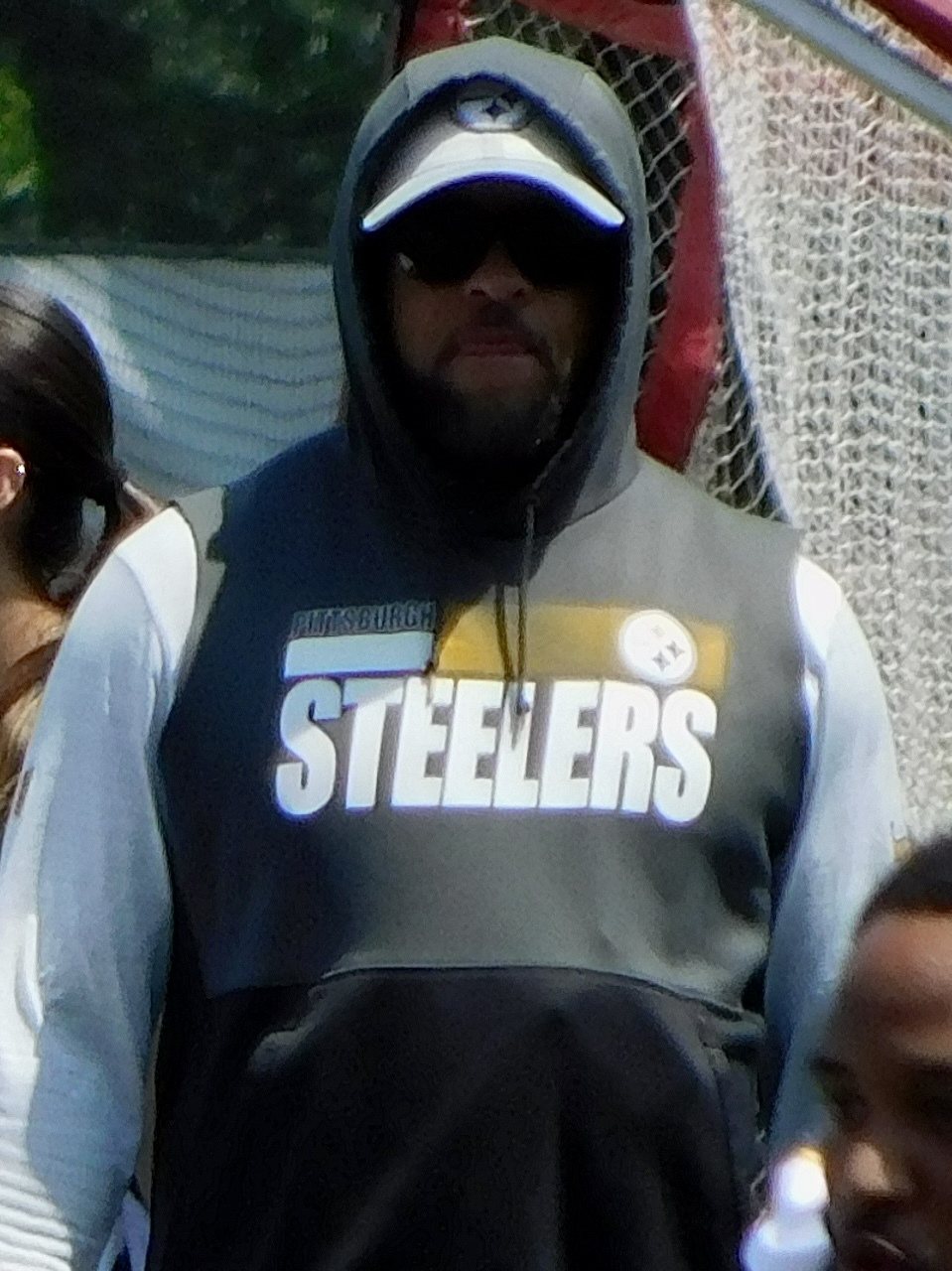
- Faulkner with the Pittsburgh Steelers in 2025

Baltimore Ravens
- Title: Running backs coach

Personal information
- Born: October 20, 1977 (age 49); Muncie, Indiana, U.S.

Career information
- Position: Tailback
- High school: Muncie Central (IN)
- College: Wisconsin (1996–2000)
- NFL draft: 2001: undrafted

Career history

Playing
- Pittsburgh Steelers (2001)*; Edmonton Eskimos (2001)
- * Offseason or practice squad member only

Coaching
- Anderson (IN) (2002) Running backs coach; Ball State (2003–2010); Graduate assistant (2003–2004); Running backs coach & special teams coordinator (2005–2008); Offensive coordinator & running backs coach (2009–2010); Northern Illinois (2011) Running backs coach & special teams coordinator; Pittsburgh (2012) Running backs coach; Wisconsin (2012) Tight ends coach; NC State (2013–2018) Tight ends coach, fullbacks coach & special teams coordinator; Pittsburgh Steelers (2019–2025); Running backs coach (2019–2025); Interim offensive coordinator & running backs coach (2023); Baltimore Ravens (2026–present) Running backs coach
- Coaching profile at Pro Football Reference

Eddie Faulkner (born October 20, 1977) is an American football coach who is currently the running backs coach for the Baltimore Ravens of the National Football League (NFL).

== Playing career ==
Faulkner played college football at Wisconsin from 1996 to 2000. He was a tailback, compiling 1,064 yards and seven touchdowns over his career. After his college career was over, he signed a pro contract with the Pittsburgh Steelers before going on to play for the Edmonton Eskimos.

== Coaching career ==
After his playing career was over, he started coaching at Anderson University as a running backs coach before moving on to Ball State.

=== Ball State ===
Faulkner joined the coaching staff at Ball State as a graduate assistant in 2003, working all the way up to offensive coordinator in 2009. He was named the interim head coach in 2010 after Stan Parrish was fired.

=== Northern Illinois ===
Faulkner left Northern Illinois to accept an assistant coaching position at Pittsburgh before leaving Pittsburgh to take a position at his alma mater Wisconsin.

=== Wisconsin ===
Faulkner was named the tight ends coach at his alma mater Wisconsin in 2012.

=== NC State ===
Faulkner left Wisconsin after one season to accept a position at NC State as a tight ends and fullbacks coach, and special teams coordinator.

=== Pittsburgh Steelers ===
Faulkner was named the running backs coach for the Pittsburgh Steelers on January 17, 2019. After the firing of offensive coordinator Matt Canada on November 21, 2023, quarterbacks coach Mike Sullivan was designated as the team's primary play-caller for the remainder of the season, with Faulkner taking over as interim offensive coordinator.
