= Microbe: The Anatomical Adventure =

1982 video game

- Publisher: Synergistic Software
- Platform: Apple II
- Release: 1982

Microbe: The Anatomical Adventure is a 1982 video game published by Synergistic Software for the Apple II.

== Gameplay ==
Microbe is a game in which a microscopic crew must journey through the body starting from the leg, through various organs and the connecting veins and arteries, to the brain to find out what is wrong with the patient.

== Reception ==
Tom Cleaver reviewed the game for Computer Gaming World, and stated that "I thoroughly recommend Microbe to gamers of every stripe for the enjoyment it provides, and I recommend it to everyone else for its educational content."

== See also ==
- Fantastic Voyage
