= The Beverly Hillbillies (video game) =

1993 video game

- Developer: Synergistic Software
- Publisher: Capstone Software
- Director: Robert C. Clardy
- Producers: Leigh M. Rothschild (Executive); David Turner
- Programmers: James David Walley; Michael D. Branham
- Artist: Kirt Lemons
- Composer: Christopher Barker
- Engine: World Builder
- Platform: MS-DOS
- Release: 1993
- Genre: Adventure

The Beverly Hillbillies is a video game developed by Synergistic Software and published in 1993 by Capstone Software for IBM PC compatibles. It was released in conjunction with the 1993 film of the same name (itself a remake of the 1960s television show). The game, a point-and-click adventure, tells the story of the Clampetts, a poor family in the Ozarks who discover oil on their property and become millionaires, moving to Beverly Hills with their newfound wealth. Despite being a tie-in to the film, the game shares only vague similarities in plot.

Poorly received at its release, The Beverly Hillbillies has since been mentioned as one of the worst video games ever made because of its frustrating puzzles and numerous bugs.

== Plot ==
Jed Clampett is hunting rabbit near the family's shack in the Ozark Mountains. During the hunt, he stumbles upon an oil field, generating millions in wealth for the family. The family drives their jalopy across the Los Angeles freeway, eventually arriving at their new home in Beverly Hills.

In Los Angeles, the Clampetts meet a bank employee named Tyler and plan a hoedown to celebrate their arrival. During the hoedown, Granny Clampett is kidnapped by Tyler and his partner-in-crime Laura in a scheme to embezzle the Clampetts' wealth. The family discovers Granny locked in a bank vault.

To free Granny, the Clampetts concoct a "tonic" using a variety of strange ingredients, including a bear claw, corn mash, and weasel hair. The tonic is then used to weaken the vault door. Granny is rescued, and Tyler and Laura are thwarted.

== Reception ==
The Beverly Hillbillies received mixed to negative reviews on release. A Computer Gaming World review noted its "banal puzzles" and stated that adventure game fans should "look elsewhere." A review in Game Players PC Entertainment called the game "atrocious," scoring the game 0.5/5 and criticizing "obtuse" puzzles and poor humor.

The game has been remembered as an example of the poor quality of licensed games, as well as one of the "biggest stinkers of all time." A 2005 essay in Computer Gaming World cited The Beverly Hillbillies as a particularly poor example of video game tie-ins, calling it "lazy, cynical, pointless," and "soulless."
