= Alfred A. Stratton =

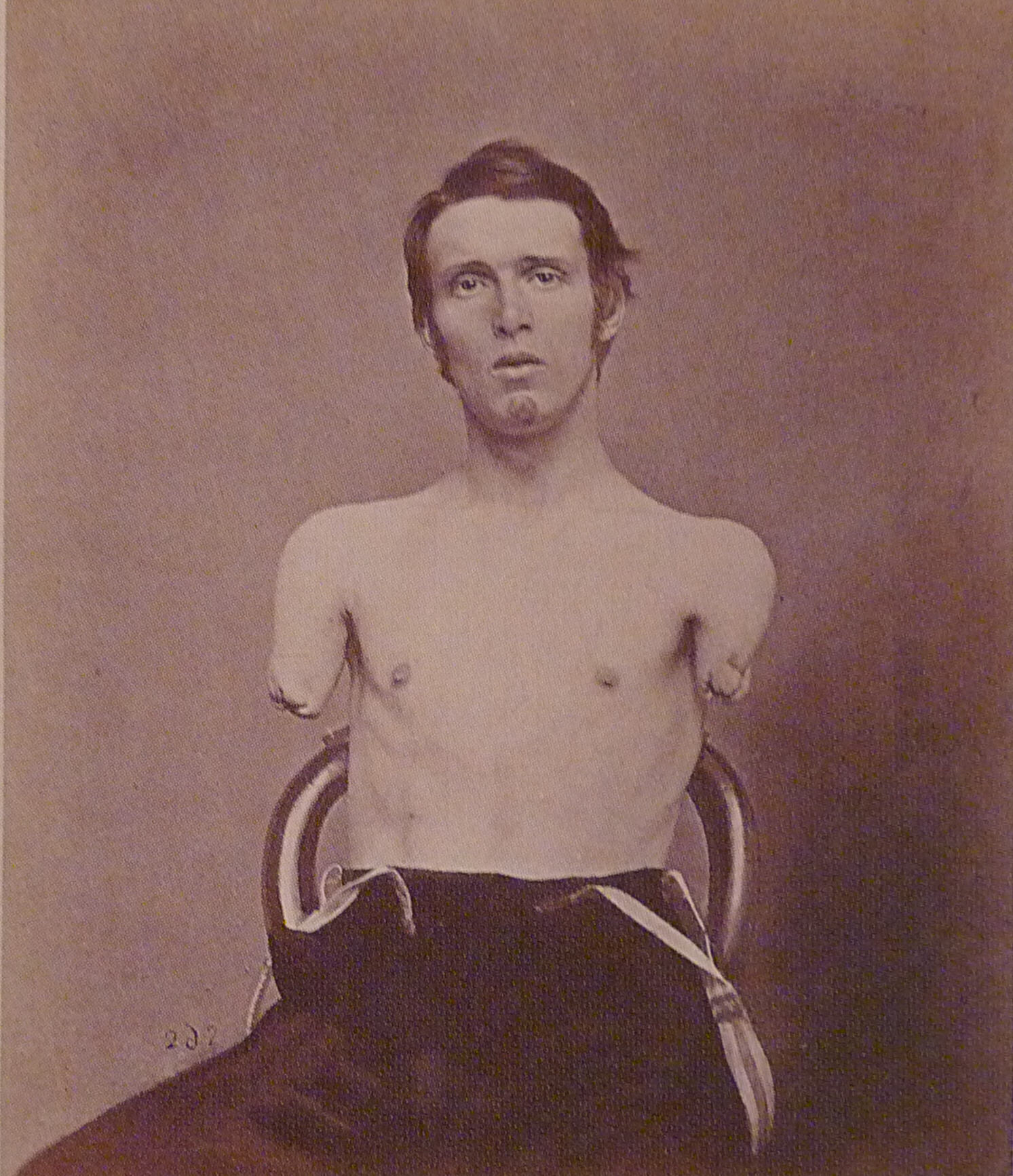
- Stratton on December 24, 1869
- Born: 1844; Chautauqua County, New York
- Died: June 10, 1874 (aged 29–30); Washington, D.C.
- Military career
- Allegiance: Union
- Branch: Army
- Service years: 1861-1864
- Rank: Sergeant
- Units: Company G, 147th New York Infantry Regiment
- Conflicts: American Civil War; Battle of the Wilderness; Battle of Spotsylvania Court House; Battle of North Anna; Battle of Totopotomoy Creek; Battle of Cold Harbor; Siege of Petersburg

Alfred A. Stratton (1844 - June 10, 1874) was a Union soldier who had both his arms amputated during the Siege of Petersburg in 1864. Following the war, he became a watch at the and when Alfred died in 1874, his coffin was carried by four Civil War amputees.

== Early life ==
Alfred was born in the Autumn of 1844 in Chatauqua County, New York and orphaned at a young age. Alfred worked as a blacksmith and enlisted in the Union Army when he was just 17-years-old at Ellicott, New York on August 19, 1863.

== Civil War ==
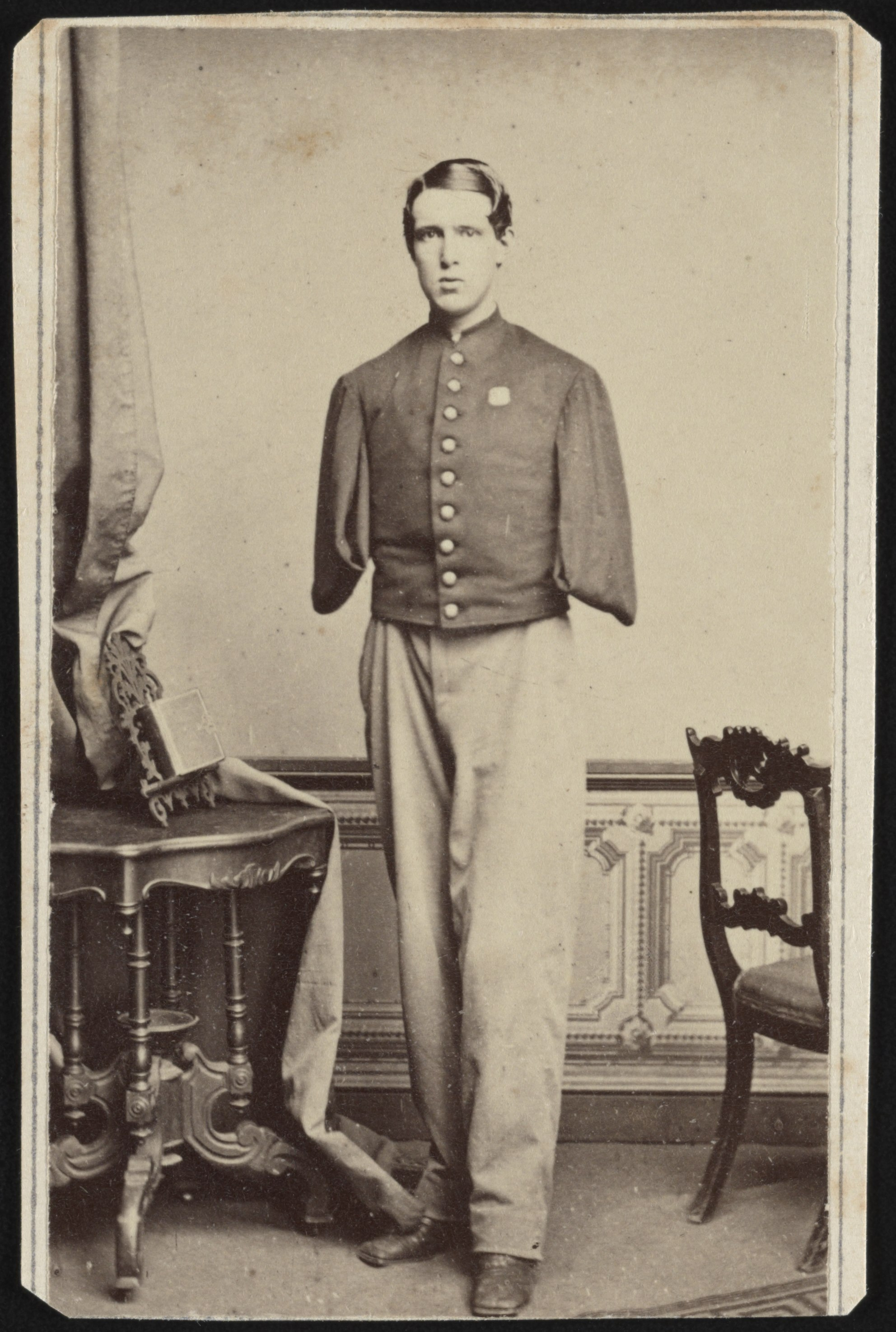
Sgt. Alfred Stratton (1864)

Alfred was placed in Company G, 147th New York Infantry and took part in several battles including the Battle of the Wilderness, the Battle of Spotsylvania Court House and the Battle of North Anna. However, on June 18, 1864, during the Siege of Petersburg while Alfred was a part of an assault on Fort Steedman, he was struck by a Confederate cannonball and suffered extreme damage to his arms which were amputated by a man known as A. S. Coe. Following this, Alfred was promoted to a sergeant and was discharged on September 27, 1864.

== Post War ==
Following Alfred's military discharge, he married Julia Elizabeth Johnson and had three children: Alfred Mertin Stratton (1866–1867), Alice Stratton (b. 1867) and Henry Draper Stratton (1871–1915). Following the war, Alfred was praised for gallantry and befriended Reuben Fenton. Alfred found employment as a watchman for the United States Department of the Treasury in Washington, D.C. and died aged 29. His pallbearers were four other amputated soldiers.
