= Battleship: Surface Thunder =

2000 video game

- Developer: Meyer/Glass Interactive
- Publisher: Hasbro Interactive
- Producer: Michael Rea
- Designer: Michael Rea
- Programmer: Scott Ramsey
- Composer: Jeff van Dyck
- Platform: Microsoft Windows
- Release: NA: September 12, 2000
- Genre: Action game
- Modes: Single-player, multiplayer

Battleship: Surface Thunder (also known as Battleship 2: Surface Thunder) is a PC video game developed by Meyer/Glass Interactive and published by Hasbro Interactive. It was released in the United States on September 12, 2000. The game is split into two modes: the regular classic battleship and a new arcade version that expands on the classic game in the form of a mission-based third-person shooter.

== Gameplay ==
=== Classic battleship ===
In classic, players can play different versions of the board game with up to three other players. Players select between 6x6, 8x8, and 10x10 grids before a match begins. All modes begin with the placement of five ships, which can be rotated freely. After both players place all of their ships, they take turns firing single shots at the opposing player's grid; they can either hit or miss. In Salvo, however, the player fires multiple shots at once depending on the number of ships the player has. In Volley, the player gets to fire again if they manage to hit a ship. Once a ship is hit, the ship sinks, causing the player to lose a shot per turn in Salvo. The first player to sink all of the opponent's ships wins the game.

=== Arcade battleship ===
In arcade, the player controls the Battleship, travelling in 3D maps and destroying opposing ships, turrets, and planes as the player attempts to reach the exit. As the Battleship, the player can fire in four directions, call in a whale to extinguish a fire, and take advantage of various power-ups found throughout the game's 20 maps.

==== Power-ups ====
In the maps, various power-ups can be collected to assist in destroying enemies and surviving their intense fire. Armor can extend the player's life bar up to two times, while red and green health crates will restore health. Extra lives will give the player another chance should they die. Invincibility crates will temporarily make the player invulnerable to damage. Speed and turbo can increase the ship's speed, making it easier to dodge enemy fire. Turret and rapid-fire give the ship greater firepower. Depth charges and rockets allow the player to take on submarines and aircraft respectively. Mines and flames give other options to take out enemy ships. With the submarine power-up, the ship can briefly transform into a submarine, which makes ships, turrets, and aircraft unable to attack.

==== Levels ====
The game features 20 missions with various objectives, which include rescuing a certain number of life rafts, destroying specific targets, and escorting allies. Some missions are linear paths to the exit, while others feature branching pathways that have different enemies and power-ups. As the player navigates through the level, they will be faced with numerous enemies and structures, some of which must be destroyed, either to complete the mission objective or to open the next gate. The player can use standard fire or any nearby power-ups to take on these enemies. The player can be awarded points or extra power-ups if they take out the enemies. If the player loses all of their health, they will lose a life, and the player respawns immediately with the invincibility power-up. If the player loses all of their lives, they must restart the mission and their points are reset back to zero.

== Plot ==
A neighboring country's kind king has fallen ill and can no longer rule, so his son, Good Prince Dudley, has taken his place on the throne. However, Prince Dudley vanishes during one of his travels, and the shady Lord Drash has assumed control in his absence. Lord Drash's first act as ruler was to launch an unprovoked and devastating attack on the surface fleet. Enemy ships have sunk all the ships in the fleet – except the lone battleship under the player's command. The player must locate Prince Dudley and restore him to power.

== Reviews ==
Reception

Aggregate score
Aggregator	Score
Metacritic	65/100

Review scores
Publication	Score
GameSpot	5.0/10
GameZone	9.5/10
IGN	7.4/10

Battleship: Surface Thunder received "mixed" reviews according to Metacritic. The game received a 7.4/10 (Decent) rating on IGN. GameSpot rated Battleship: Surface Thunder 5.0/10. Many praised the classic version mode and detailed ships and environments but criticized repetitive gameplay and some visual issues.
