= Super Battleship =

1993 video game

- Packaging for the Super NES version
- Developer: Synergistic Software
- Publisher: Mindscape
- Platforms: Super NES, Genesis
- Release: Super NES: NA: November 1993; Genesis: NA: January 1994
- Genre: Strategy
- Modes: Super Battleship and Classic Battleship (single-player)

Super Battleship is a naval simulator video game released for the Super NES and Genesis. The game is strictly single-player and is primarily a strategy game with some real-time elements. It is based on the Battleship board game by the Milton Bradley Company.

== Gameplay ==
The game features two modes: Super Battleship mode and Classic Battleship mode. Classic Battleship mode is essentially an electronic version of the board game Battleship, where the players play against the computer because the game is strictly single-player.

Super Battleship is a naval simulator played by sailing ships to a close enough range to shoot an opponent's ships and cities. Super Battleship contains 16 missions that must be completed within a certain number of rounds. Ships have four different weapons: missiles, torpedoes, depth charges, and guns. The game is turn-based with each side giving movement and attack orders within a time limit. A turn ends when either the time limit expires or all ships receive orders. Actual combat occurs in real-time: guns and torpedoes are fired at surface ships while the opponent can fire back. Depth charges are dropped on submerged submarines. Cruise missiles move erratically and must be guided to the target. Crewmen can be assigned to repair ships' damaged systems. Ships resupply by capturing bases and storehouses or pulling into friendly harbors. In some missions, once the player, the enemy, and the neutral merchant ships have taken their turns, friendly or enemy shore batteries will then attack any ships that are within range of their fire support.

The game's interface contains both radar and sonar modes. Radar detects surface ships while sonar detects submarines and mines. Victory conditions vary from escorting freighters to a destination or completely destroying an enemy force.

Aside from the battles taking place in real-time, Super Battleship is essentially a strategy game with a relatively slow pace. It also provides no background and very little storyline. The four ships are the same as those in Classic Battleship (PT Boat, Cruiser, Destroyer, Battleship) but only the enemy gets to use submarines.

== Versions ==
The Genesis and Super NES versions differ from each other in a few aspects. Although the missions are the same, the graphics are significantly improved in the SNES version, as well as the difficulty reduced. In the Genesis version, the firing of the ships is faster as well as the pace of the rest of the gameplay. Additionally, the method of firing and aiming missiles changed: the Genesis version require missiles to dive on a target, while in the SNES version the missiles oscillated from side to side. In addition, the SNES version also has "Taps" play whenever a ship sinks (save for when the last ship sinks).

== Reception ==
Electronic Games gave the SNES version 79%.
