= Gregory D. Gadson =

United States Army officer (born 1966)

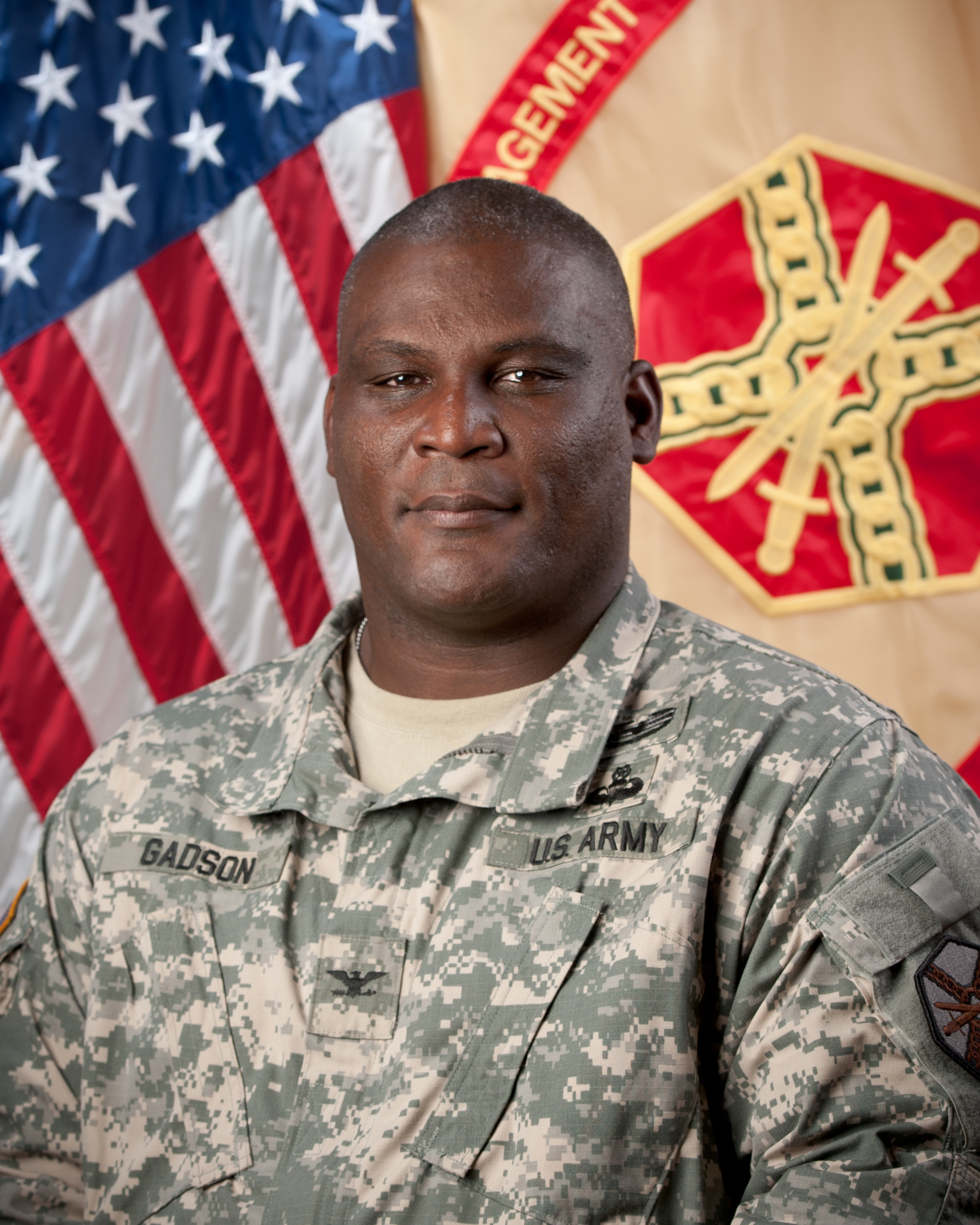
- Born: February 19, 1966 (age 60); Chesapeake, Virginia
- Education: United States Military Academy (BS); Webster University (MA); Georgetown University (MPM)
- Military career
- Allegiance: United States
- Branch: United States Army; Field Artillery
- Service years: 1989–2014
- Rank: Colonel
- Units: 2nd Battalion, 32nd Field Artillery Regiment
- Commands: U.S. Army Garrison: Fort Belvoir; 2nd Battalion, 32nd Field Artillery Regiment
- Conflicts: Gulf War; Operation Desert Storm; Kosovo War; Iraq War; War in Afghanistan
- Awards: Distinguished Service Medal; Legion of Merit; Bronze Star (3 awards); Purple Heart; Meritorious Service Medal; Army Commendation Medal

Gregory Dimitri Gadson (born February 19, 1966) is an American actor, a motivational speaker, and a retired colonel in the United States Army and former commander of the U.S. Army Fort Belvoir garrison. He is also a bilateral above-the-knee amputee. He served in the U.S. Army for 25 years of active duty as a field artillery officer. He served in Operations Desert Shield and Desert Storm, Operation Joint Forge, Operation Enduring Freedom, and Operation Iraqi Freedom.

== Education and military career ==
Gadson attended the United States Military Academy at West Point, New York, graduating in 1989. He also holds a master's degree in Information systems from Webster University and a master's degree in policy management from Georgetown University. He is a graduate of the Command and General Staff College and the Advanced Field Artillery Officers Course and in 2010, he became an Army War College Fellow at the Institute of World Politics in Washington, D.C.

=== Assignments ===
- Commander, U.S. Army Garrison, Fort Belvoir, Virginia
- Director, Army Wounded Warrior Program, Alexandria, Virginia
- 2nd Battalion, 32nd Field Artillery.
- 4th Infantry Brigade Combat Team, 1st Infantry Division (Fort Riley).
- Battalion fire direction officer for 5th Battalion, 18th Field Artillery, III Corps at Fort Sill.
- Division targeting officer, Headquarters and Headquarters Battery, 82nd Airborne Division Artillery.
- Battalion adjutant, 3rd Battalion, 319th Airborne Field Artillery Regiment.
- Battalion fire support officer, 1st Battalion, 504th Parachute Infantry Regiment.
- Commander, Battery C, 3rd Battalion, 319th Airborne Field Artillery Regiment.
- Commander, Headquarters and Headquarters Company, 82nd Airborne Division for the 82nd Airborne Division at Fort Bragg.
- Personnel distribution officer and human resources commander, Alexandria, Virginia.
- Battalion operations officer, 2nd Battalion, 11th Field Artillery.
- Operations officer, 25th Infantry Division, executive officer.
- Special assistant to the commanding general, United States Army Pacific at Fort Shafter.

=== Deployments ===
- Platoon fire direction officer, firing battery platoon leader (Desert Shield/Desert Storm)
- Chief of operations, Multinational Division North, Bosnia-Herzegovina, (Stabilization Force XI), 25th Infantry Division (Light)
- 25th Infantry Division Artillery, Forward Operating Base Salerno, Afghanistan (Operation Enduring Freedom V)

=== Injury ===
On the night of May 7, 2007, while returning from a memorial service for two soldiers from his brigade, he lost both his legs and severely injured his right arm to a roadside bomb in Baghdad. He became one of the first military personnel to use a next-generation powered prosthetic knee with technology to make it possible for amputees to walk with confidence and with a more natural gait.

=== Military awards ===

Distinguished Service 2 awards	Legion of Merit	Bronze Star Medal 3 awards	Purple Heart
Meritorious Service Medal 4 awards	Army Commendation Medal 4 awards	Army Achievement Medal 4 awards	National Defense Service Medal 2 awards
Armed Forces Expeditionary Medal 3 awards	Southwest Asia Service Medal 3 awards	Afghanistan Campaign Medal	Iraq Campaign Medal
Global War on Terrorism Service Medal	NATO Medal for Service in ex-Yugoslavia	Kuwait Liberation Medal (Saudi Arabia)	Kuwait Liberation Medal (Kuwait)

Gadson is also authorized to wear the Combat Action Badge and the Master Parachutist Badge.

=== Civil awards ===
He won one of the prestigious Henry Viscardi Achievement Awards for 2017, bestowed by the Viscardi Center to honour extraordinary leaders with disabilities.

== Athletics ==
Gadson played football at West Point between 1985 and 1988, wearing the No. 98 jersey. In 2007, he was present when the New York Giants beat the Washington Redskins at FedExField at the invitation of West Point classmate Mike Sullivan, who was then on the coaching staff of the New York Giants. This win was the beginning of a 10-game road winning streak and came after Gadson had made an inspirational speech to the team. The streak culminated in the Giants winning Super Bowl XLII and in recognition of his contribution, Gadson received a specially minted Super Bowl ring. Gadson has since remained with the team as a motivational speaker.

== Acting career ==
Gadson made his acting debut in Battleship, a 2012 American science fiction naval war film, as Lieutenant Colonel Mick Canales, playing a war veteran who regains his appetite for life when Oahu is threatened by an alien attack. Director Peter Berg, having seen news articles about Gadson, decided to cast him as an army officer trying to recover from the loss of his legs. In 2023, Gadson made a guest appearance on the television series NCIS: Los Angeles, specifically in the second episode of the fourteenth season titled "Of Value".

== Photography ==
Gadson has been an avid photographer for many years. His work has most recently been featured prominently in Coming Home: Journey, Community, Dialog, a public art project based in New York City that seeks to encourage communication between civilians and those who have served in the US military.

== Filmography ==
- Battleship (2012) – Lieutenant Colonel Mick Canales
- The Inspectors (2015–2016) – David Cole (10 episodes)
- A Journal for Jordan (2021) – (Uncredited)
- NCIS: Los Angeles (2022–2023) – Col. Jackson Ladd (2 episodes)
- Freedom Isn't Free (2024) – Himself (short film)
