= Battleship Butte =

Mountain in Utah, United States

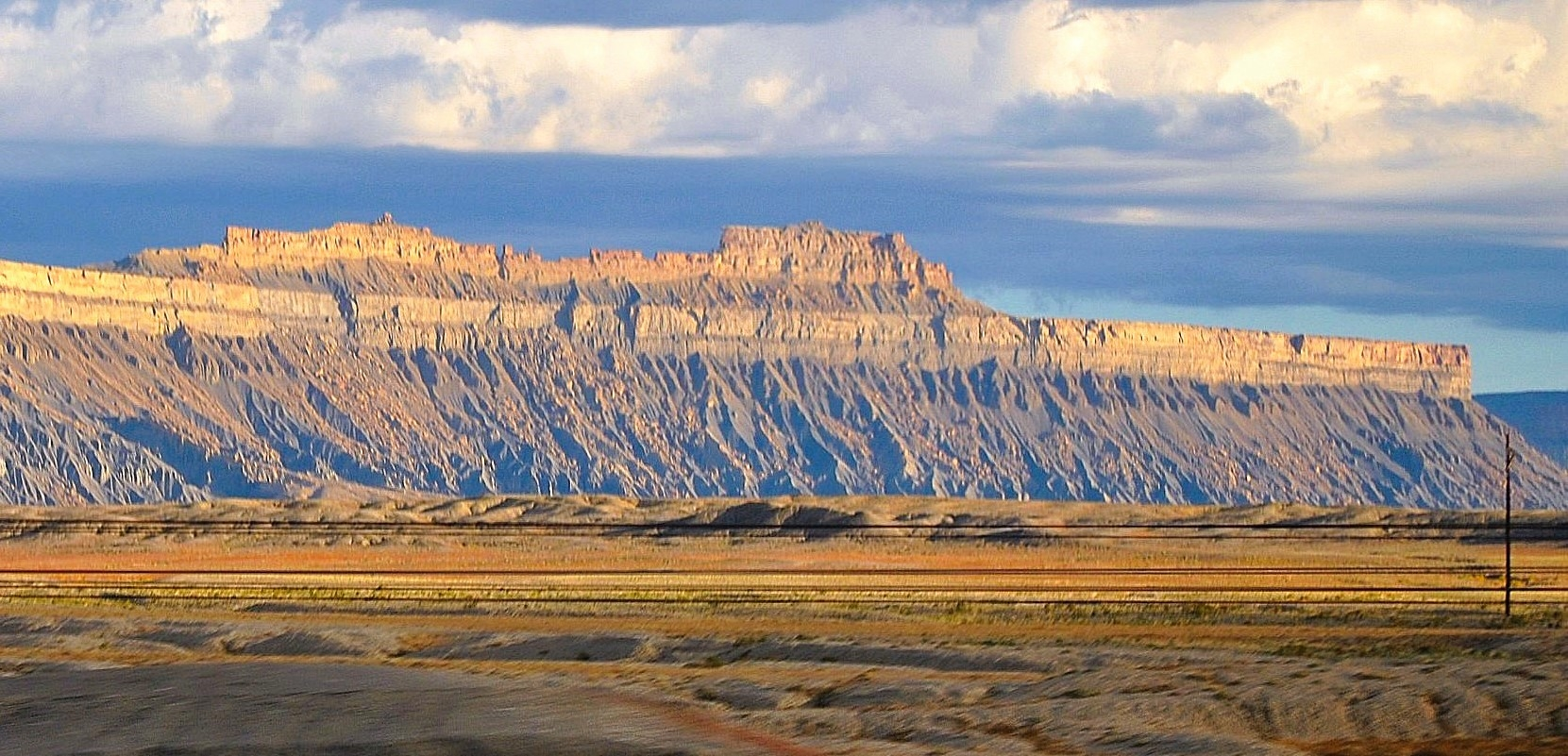
- South aspect

Highest point
- Elevation: 5,802 ft (1,768 m)
- Prominence: 355 ft (108 m)
- Parent peak: Cliff Benchmark
- Isolation: 1.10 mi (1.77 km)
- Coordinates: 39°04′19″N 110°11′20″W

Naming
- Etymology: Battleship

Geography
- Location within Utah Location within the United States
- Country: United States
- State: Utah
- County: Emery
- Protected area: Desolation Canyon Wilderness
- Parent range: Colorado Plateau
- Topo map: USGS Blue Castle Butte

Geology
- Rock age: Late Cretaceous
- Rock type: Sedimentary rock

Climbing
- First ascent: 1968 by Leo Dumas and party
- Easiest route: class 5.5

Battleship Butte is a 5,802-foot (1,768 m) summit in Emery County, Utah, United States.

== Description ==
Battleship Butte is situated six miles (9.7 km) north of the town of Green River at the southern end of the Beckwith Plateau and along the boundary of the Desolation Canyon Wilderness Study Area which is the largest Wilderness study area managed by the Bureau of Land Management in the contiguous 48 states. Precipitation runoff from this landform drains to the Green River which flows two miles east of the butte. Topographic relief is significant as the summit rises 1,400 feet (427 meters) above the surrounding terrain in 0.4 mile (0.64 km). The butte is composed of sandstone of the Mesaverde Group which was deposited in the Late Cretaceous, and it overlays Mancos Shale of the surrounding terrain. The butte is so named because its profile resembles a battleship. The descriptive toponym has been officially adopted by the U.S. Board on Geographic Names.

== Climate ==
According to the Köppen climate classification system, Battleship Butte is located in a Cold semi-arid climate zone, which is defined by the coldest month having an average mean temperature below 32 °F (0 °C), and at least 50% of the total annual precipitation being received during the spring and summer. This desert climate receives less than 10 inches (250 millimeters) of annual rainfall, and snowfall is generally light during the winter. Spring and fall are the most favorable seasons to Battleship Gunnison Butte.

== Gallery ==
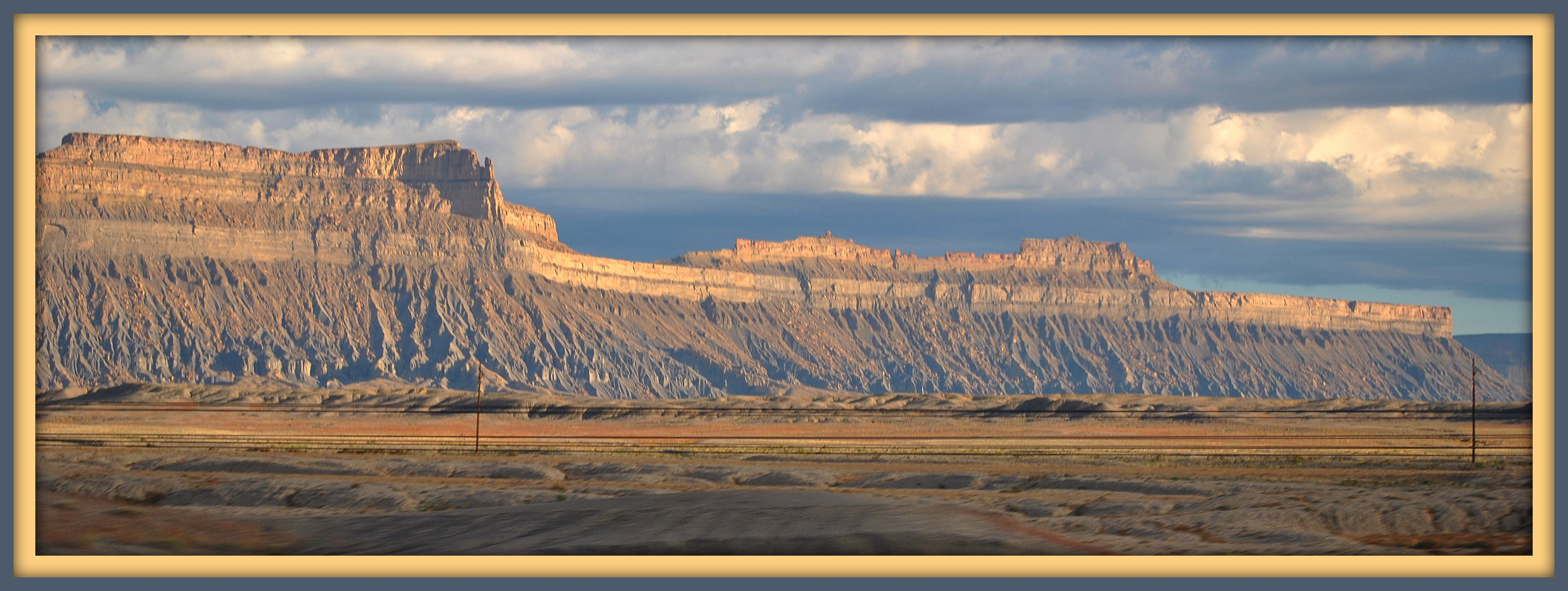
Cliff Benchmark (left) and Battleship Butte (right) from south

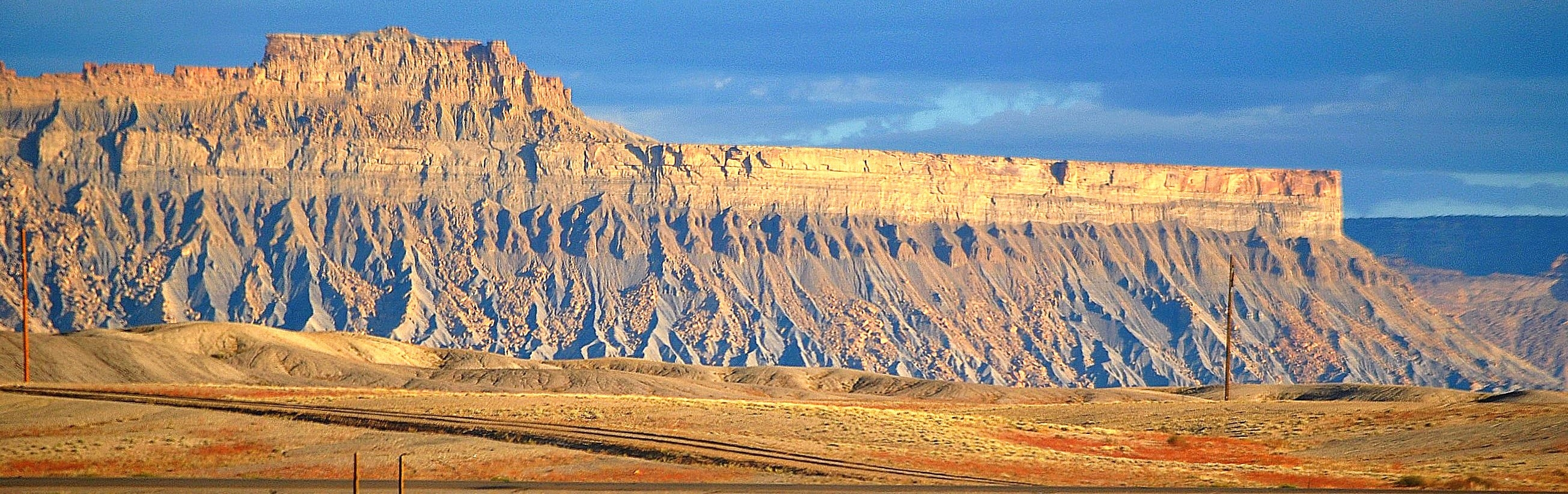
South aspect of Battleship Butte seen from the California Zephyr

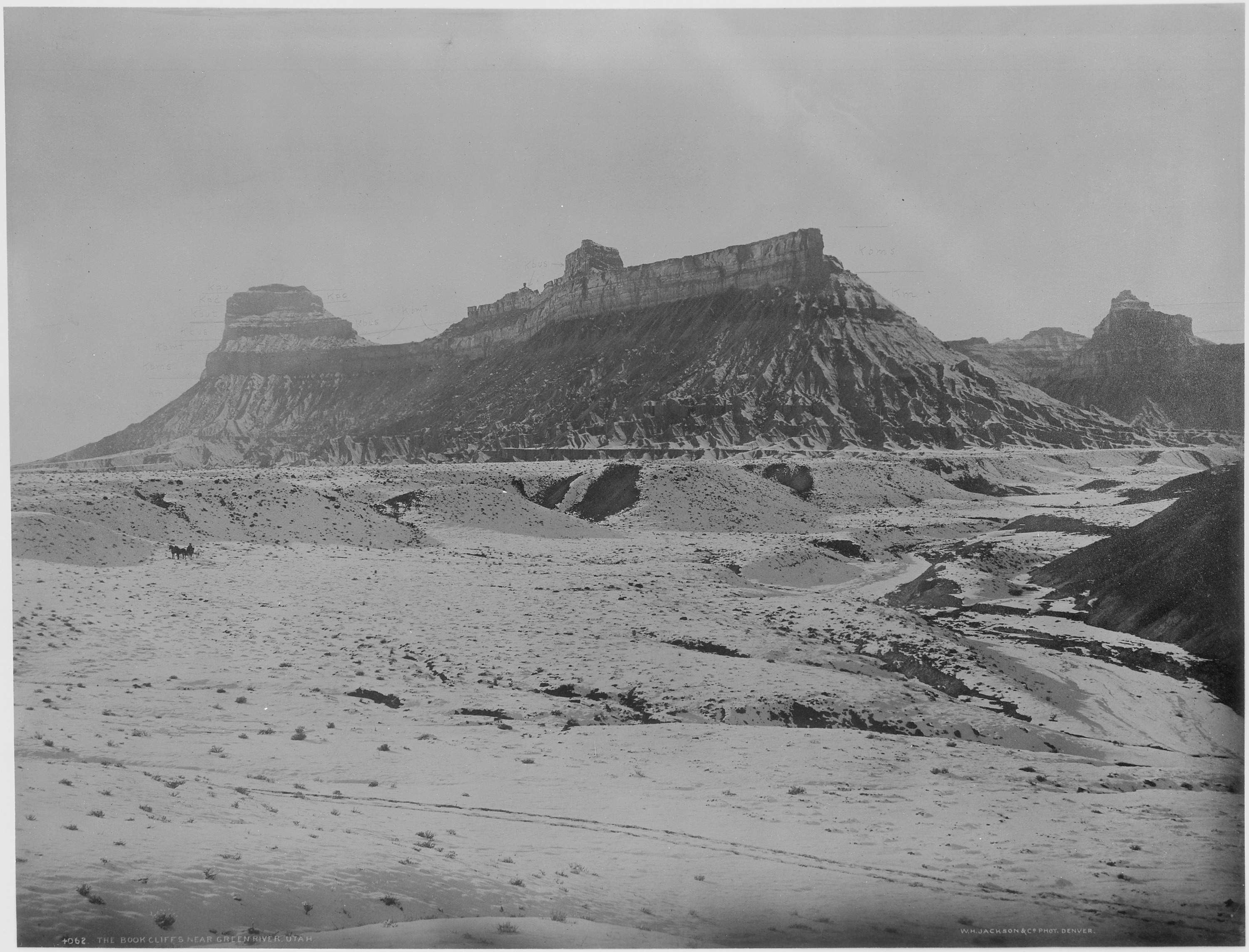
East aspect, centered
(Cliff Benchmark to left, Blue Castle Butte to right)
Photo by William Henry Jackson, circa 1870s

== See also ==
- List of mountains of Utah
