= Battleship (film) =

2012 military science fiction action film by Peter Berg

- Theatrical release poster
- Directed by: Peter Berg
- Written by: Jon Hoeber; Erich Hoeber
- Based on: Battleship by Hasbro
- Produced by: Brian Goldner; Scott Stuber; Peter Berg; Sarah Aubrey; Duncan Henderson; Bennett Schneir
- Starring: Taylor Kitsch; Alexander Skarsgård; Rihanna; Brooklyn Decker; Tadanobu Asano; Liam Neeson
- Cinematography: Tobias A. Schliessler
- Edited by: Colby Parker Jr.; Billy Rich; Paul Rubell
- Music by: Steve Jablonsky
- Production companies: Hasbro Studios; Bluegrass Films; Film 44
- Distributed by: Universal Pictures
- Release dates: April 3, 2012 (Yoyogi National Stadium); May 18, 2012 (United States)
- Running time: 131 minutes
- Country: United States
- Language: English
- Budget: $209–220 million
- Box office: $303 million

Battleship is a 2012 American military science fiction film loosely based on the board game of the same name by Hasbro. The film was co-produced and directed by Peter Berg and written by Jon and Erich Hoeber. It stars Taylor Kitsch, Alexander Skarsgård, Rihanna in her feature film debut, Brooklyn Decker, Tadanobu Asano and Liam Neeson. The film follows the crews of a small group of warships as they are forced to battle against a naval fleet of extraterrestrial origin in order to thwart their destructive goals.

Battleship premiered at the Yoyogi National Stadium in Tokyo on April 3, 2012, and was released by Universal Pictures in the United States on May 18. The film received generally negative reviews and flopped at the box-office, grossing $303 million worldwide against a production budget of $209–220 million, losing both Universal and Hasbro $150 million and making it one of the biggest box-office bombs of all time.

== Plot ==
In 2005, the potentially habitable "Planet G" is discovered, and in 2006, a communications array to reach any extraterrestrial life is built on Oʻahu. There, a slacking Alex Hopper is arrested while attempting to impress Samantha "Sam" Shane, daughter of Admiral Terrance Shane. Alex's brother, Commander Stone Hopper, forces Alex to join the United States Navy.

Six years later, Alex is a lieutenant aboard the USS John Paul Jones and in a relationship with Sam, a physical therapist working with wounded veterans. While Stone is a model officer commanding the USS Sampson, the rebellious Alex, despite showing plenty of potential, is facing a disciplinary discharge.

During the 2012 RIMPAC exercise, five alien spacecraft arrive. Their communications ship hits a satellite and crashes through the Bank of China Tower in Hong Kong, while the others plunge into the waters off the coast of Hawaii. Sampson, John Paul Jones, and Japanese destroyer JDS Myōkō discover a floating structure that generates an impenetrable force field, isolating the Hawaiian Islands and the three destroyers from the rest of the world and jamming all radar and communications inside.

Three alien warships surface and first contact devolves into a battle after the humans decide to fire a warning shot across the aliens' bow; Myōkō is destroyed, Sampson is lost with all hands, including Stone, and John Paul Jones' command personnel and executive officer are killed, leaving Alex to reluctantly take charge as the next highest-ranking sailor on board. John Paul Jones disengages to recover Myōkō's survivors, including Captain Yugi Nagata, while alien drones destroy Oahu's military bases.

Hiking near the communications array, Sam and retired United States Army lieutenant colonel and double amputee Mick Canales discover the aliens' presence. They encounter scientist Cal Zapata, who reveals the aliens have taken over the array to re-establish communications with their home planet. The John Paul Jones' crew captures an alien, who telepathically shows Alex images of alien conflict and planetary destruction.

More aliens board and retrieve their comrade while one starts sabotaging the ship. Its armored suit proves impervious to small-arms fire, but it is obliterated by the destroyer's 5-inch gun, and the captured alien's helmet reveals their eyes are hypersensitive to sunlight. Ashore, Sam, Mick, and Cal recover his spectrum analyzer, using it to radio John Paul Jones that the aliens will contact their planet and most likely call for reinforcements when the facility's satellite is in position in four hours.

As night falls, Hopper realises they have no visibility. Nagata suggests using the National Oceanic and Atmospheric Administration (NOAA) tsunami warning buoys around Hawaii to track the warships without radar; this plan works and allows John Paul Jones to destroy two of them. The third proves too elusive, so they lure it into facing east as the sun rises. Alex and Nagata shoot out its bridge windows with sniper rifles, blinding its crew with sunlight and allowing John Paul Jones to destroy it. The destroyer then attempts to target the communications array, but is sunk by drones launched from the alien structure emitting the force field; Alex, Nagata, and several other sailors barely escape.

The survivors commandeer the decommissioned World War II-built battleship USS Missouri with the aid of retired Navy veterans. The floating structure is revealed to be a giant mothership, but Missouri disables the force field, allowing Admiral Shane to scramble fighter jets from the aircraft carrier USS Ronald Reagan. The battleship's turret carrying the ship's last shell is disabled, forcing the sailors to carry the shell by hand to the ship's last functioning turret. Sam, Mick, and Cal stall the aliens at the array, where Mick kills an alien soldier. Alex uses the final shell to destroy the array, rendering the Missouri defenseless, but the mothership's drones are destroyed by Royal Australian Air Force (RAAF) F/A-18 fighter jets, as reinforcements carpet bomb the mothership, eliminating the alien threat.

Alex is promoted to lieutenant commander and presented with a Silver Star and his brother's posthumous Navy Cross. Admiral Shane promises Alex will soon have a ship of his own, while he is also recommended to become a Navy SEAL. Alex asks him for Sam's hand in marriage; the admiral initially refuses, but invites Alex to lunch. Some time later, three boys and a repairman in Scotland are scared off by an alien that emerges from a crashed pod. Signal Transmission: NASA launches the Beacon Project, sending a powerful communication signal to a habitable alien planet in the Gliese solar system. Ocean Arrival: Five extraterrestrial spacecraft travel to Earth in response to the signal, with four of the massive vessels crashing into the Pacific Ocean near Hawaii. [1, 2] Underwater Force Field: The submerged alien ships generate a massive, impenetrable electromagnetic dome around the Hawaiian Islands, trapping a small fleet of international naval warships inside. [Amphibious Vessels: Unlike traditional flying saucers, the alien ships are massive, heavy aquatic machines that submerge beneath the ocean surface and leap out of the water like mechanical whales to launch attacks. Alien Creatures: Inside the ships are humanoid alien creatures wearing heavy, armored environmental suits with luminous visors designed to protect their eyes from Earth's bright sunlight. Naval Combat: After the aliens destroy two modern destroyers using explosive peg projectiles and spinning "shredder" drones, Lieutenant Alex Hopper takes command of the surviving ship, the USS John Paul Jones. Tracking Underwater: Because the alien ships hide underwater and jam military radar, Hopper teams up with Japanese Captain Nagata to track the submerged vessels using a grid of tsunami warning buoys. [1, 2] Final Battle: After the John Paul Jones is destroyed, the surviving crew teams up with World War II veterans to reactivate the decommissioned museum battleship USS Missouri, using it to sink the remaining alien vessels and destroy their land-based communication relay.

== Cast ==
- Taylor Kitsch as Lieutenant Alex Hopper, a highly spirited but undisciplined U.S. Navy Weapons Officer on USS John Paul Jones.
- Alexander Skarsgård as Commander Stone Hopper, Alex's older brother, commanding officer of USS Sampson.
- Rihanna as Gunner's Mate Second Class Cora "Weps" Raikes, on USS John Paul Jones.
- Brooklyn Decker as Samantha Shane, a physical therapist, Admiral Shane's daughter and Alex's girlfriend.
- Tadanobu Asano as Captain Yugi Nagata, JMSDF, Commanding Officer of JS Myōkō and Alex Hopper's rival turned friend.
- Liam Neeson as Admiral Terrance Shane, Commander of the U.S. Pacific Fleet and father of Samantha Shane.
- Hamish Linklater as Cal Zapata, a scientist working on O'ahu.
- Jesse Plemons as Boatswain's mate Seaman Jimmy "Ordy" Ord, who is sarcastic and doubtful of Alex, on USS John Paul Jones.
- John Tui as Chief Petty Officer Walter "Beast" Lynch, a crew mate of USS John Paul Jones.
- Joji Yoshida as Chief Engineer Hiroki, a crew mate of JS Myoko.
- Gregory D. Gadson as Lieutenant Colonel Mick Canales, a U.S. Army combat veteran and double amputee.
- Adam Godley as Dr. Nogrady, the scientist leading the Beacon program.
- Peter MacNicol as the U.S. Secretary of Defense
- Jerry Ferrara as Sampson JOOD Strodell
- Stephen Bishop as JPJ OOD
- Josh Pence as Chief Moore
- Rami Malek as Lieutenant Hill
- Louis Lombardi as The Bartender
- Gary Grubbs as USAF Chief of Staff
- Ray Mabus (who was at the time serving as United States Secretary of the Navy) as Reagan CO

== Production ==
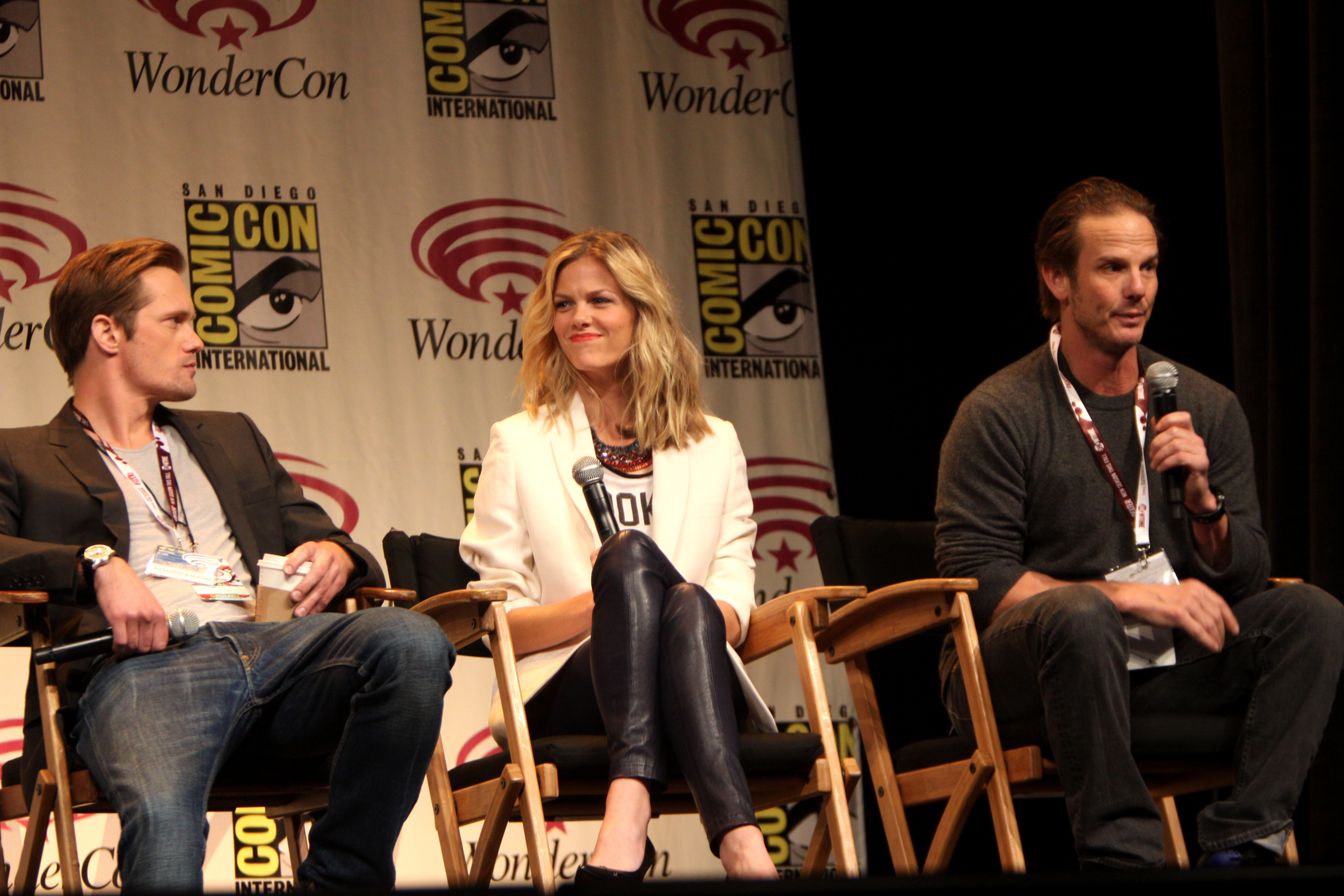
Alexander Skarsgard, Brooklyn Decker and Peter Berg promoting the film at WonderCon 2012.

Battleship was greenlit with a production budget of $150 million but went through a troubled pre-production. Universal at one point considered canceling the film, which would have resulted in a $30 million loss. However, new chairman Adam Fogelson decided the studio would lose less money if they increased the budget of the film instead of outright cancelling it. Filming was set to take place in Australia's Gold Coast in 2010, but changed location due to a lack of Australian government tax incentives and a high estimated budget of $220 million.

Filming took place in the United States on the Hawaiian islands of Maui and Oʻahu, as well as on the mainland in order to film a few apartment scenes in Sherman Oaks, California. A driving scene and a shootout were filmed in Playa del Rey, California. Some scenes were also filmed in Baton Rouge, Louisiana.

Further filming was done on the decommissioned Iowa-class battleship USS Missouri. Featured in the film were the real-life guided missile destroyers USS Benfold (DDG-65), USS John Paul Jones (DDG-53), and USS Sampson (DDG-102) all of which are active members of the US Navy Pacific Fleet. The JS Myōkō (DDG-175) a Kongō-class destroyer of the Japan Maritime Self-Defense Force also appeared in the film.

The Science & Entertainment Exchange provided science consultation for the film.

=== Casting ===
Jeremy Renner was originally considered for the role of Hopper. In April 2010, it was reported that Taylor Kitsch had been cast as Alex Hopper, Alexander Skarsgård played his brother Stone Hopper, Brooklyn Decker stars as Sam, Hopper's fiancee and Liam Neeson as Admiral Shane, Sam's father and Hopper's superior officer. Barbadian R&B singer Rihanna makes her acting debut in the film, as a sailor. In an interview with GQ, Berg explained how he came up with the idea to cast her. He realized she could act after her appearance on Saturday Night Live. She accepted the role because she wanted "to do something badass" and also because it wasn't a role too big for her to play.

Tadanobu Asano has a role in the film as the commander of the Japanese Kongō-class destroyer Myōkō. Double amputee U.S. Army Colonel Gregory Gadson, who had never acted before, plays LTC Mick Canales. He was cast after Berg saw a picture of him in National Geographic.

The film marks the reunion between former co-stars Kitsch and Jesse Plemons, who previously worked together on Berg's television series Friday Night Lights. Berg said he loves working with friends and explained he knew how comfortable Kitsch was with Plemons, "I know that he's really good for Taylor and he makes Taylor better. So, I wrote that whole part for Jesse." He added, "I never thought of it as a Friday Night Lights reunion. I thought of it as protection, bringing a trusted family member in."

U.S. Navy sailors were used as extras in various parts of this film. Sailors from assorted commands in Navy Region Hawaii assisted with line handling to take Missouri in and out of port for a day of shooting in mid 2010. A few months later, the production team put out a casting call for sailors stationed at various sea commands at Naval Station Mayport, Florida to serve as extras. Sailors were also taken from various ships stationed at Naval Station Mayport, Jacksonville, Florida, namely USS Hué City, USS Carney and USS Vicksburg were some of the ships that provided sailors.

== Music ==
Due to his success with the Transformers franchise, composer Steve Jablonsky was chosen to score the official soundtrack. The soundtrack features original compositions from Jablonsky and features rock guitarist Tom Morello from Rage Against the Machine. Director Peter Berg stated:

Working with composers often is a really frustrating experience because you speak a different language and, oftentimes, they take two or three jobs, at the same time. They're difficult and pretentious and they're tormented artists. I'm not going to name names, but most of them are. One guy who isn't is Hans Zimmer, who taught Steve Jablonsky. We had a couple of meetings, and I came up with this idea. The day I met with him, I had had an MRI for my neck, and they make that really scary sound. I was like, 'I just had this MRI, and when I was in there, I was thinking about the aliens, and it was really scary.' And he was like, 'Oh, that's awesome!' He went and recorded MRIs and made music out of MRIs, and that's the theme of the aliens in our film. He is no drama, and just goes and gets it done. The score is big and awesome and scary and driving. At times, it's very simple and acoustic and touching and emotional. He's the best I've ever worked with.

== Release ==
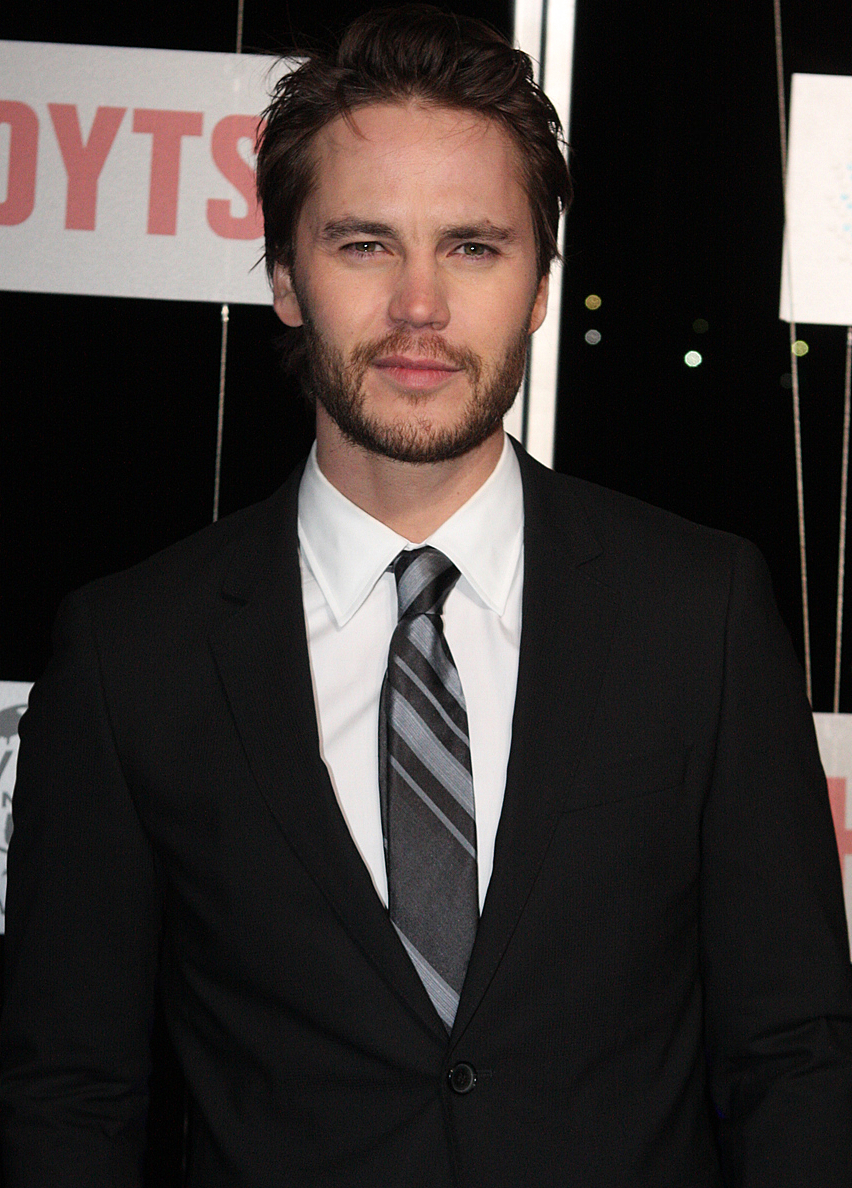
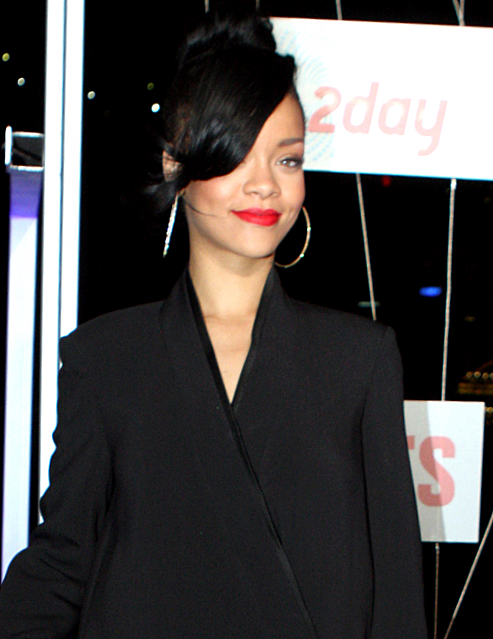
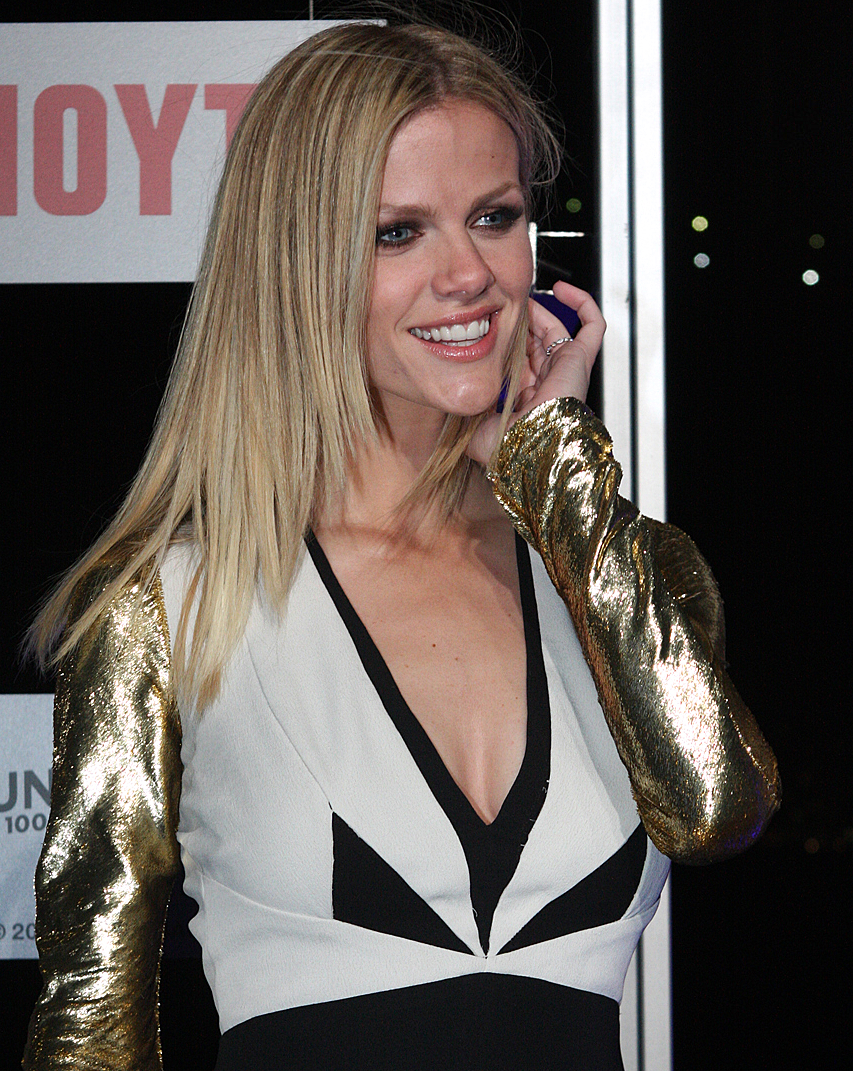
Taylor Kitsch, Rihanna and Brooklyn Decker at the Battleship Australian premiere in April 2012.

The film was released in May 18, 2012, in the United States. The film's world premiere took place in Tokyo on April 3, 2012. The event was attended by director Peter Berg, actors Taylor Kitsch, Brooklyn Decker, Alexander Skarsgård and Rihanna. Later on they initiated a Press Tour visiting Madrid, London, and Cartagena de Indias to promote the film.

=== Home media ===
Battleship was released on DVD and Blu-ray on August 20, 2012, in the United Kingdom, and on August 28 in the United States and Canada. Its revenue was $32.4 million. Battleship was released on 4K Blu-Ray on January 17, 2017. It received a novelization written by Peter David.

== Reception ==
=== Box office ===
Battleship grossed $65.4 million in the United States and Canada, and $237.6 million in other territories, for a worldwide total of $303 million, against a production budget of $209 million. In May 2012, The Hollywood Reporter estimated that Universal would lose $150 million on the film. However, a decade later, the film was a huge success on streaming services.

The film opened in several territories on Wednesday, April 11, 2012, five weeks before its North America release, grossing $7.4 million. Through April 13, the film had earned a three-day total of $25 million. By the end of its opening weekend, it earned $55.2 million from 26 markets, ranking second behind the 3D re-release of James Cameron's Titanic. In its second weekend, it topped the box office outside North America, with $60 million. In South Korea, it achieved the highest-grossing opening day for a non-sequel and the third-highest overall ($2.8 million). In comparison to other Hasbro films, Battleship's opening in the United Kingdom (£3.76 million) was behind the first Transformers (£8.72 million), but did better than G.I. Joe: The Rise of Cobra (£1.71 million).

In the United States, Battleship grossed $8.8 million on its opening day, with $420,000 from midnight showings. It went on to debut to $25.5 million, finishing in second place behind Marvel's The Avengers.

=== Critical response ===
Rotten Tomatoes reports that 33% of 222 critics gave the film a positive review and an average rating of 4.6/10. The site's critics consensus reads: "It may offer energetic escapism for less demanding filmgoers, but Battleship is too loud, poorly written, and formulaic to justify its expense – and a lot less fun than its source material." Metacritic assigned the film a weighted average score of 41 out of 100, based on 39 critics, indicating "mixed or average" reviews. Audiences polled by CinemaScore gave the film an average grade of "B" on an A+ to F scale.

Megan Lehmann of The Hollywood Reporter thought that the "impressive visual effects and director Peter Berg's epic set pieces fight against an armada of cinematic clichés and some truly awful dialogue." Empire magazine's Nick de Semlyen felt there was a lack of character development and memorable action shots, and sums up his review of the movie in one word: "Miss."

Many reviews criticized the "based on a board game" concept driving the film, although some, such as Jason Di Rosso from the Australian Broadcasting Corporation's Radio National, claimed the ridiculousness of the setup is "either sheer joy or pure hell – depending on how seriously you take it", Syfy's James Grebey admired the creative direction as "geniuses unironically with admiration" for having "instead zagged hard when every rational person would have zigged and created the most contrived and dumbest movie ever made out of what should’ve been a straightforward adaptation", while de Semlyen "had to admire [the film's creators] jumping through hoops to engineer a sequence that replicates the board game." Several compared the film to Michael Bay's Transformers film series in terms of quality and cinematic style, with Giles Hardie of The Sydney Morning Herald claiming that the movie "finds the same balance between action-packed imagination and not taking the premise seriously that made Michael Bay's original Transformers such a joyride."

Andrew Harrison of Q magazine called the film "crushingly stupid". Film critic Kenneth Turan, in a review written for the Los Angeles Times, also expressed disappointment, criticizing the film's "humanoid aliens", stating that they are "as ungainly as the movie itself, clunking around in awkward, protective suits." He called the content "all very earnest", but added "it's not a whole lot of fun". Peter Travers of Rolling Stone gave the film one out of four stars, and he commented "Battleship is all noise and crashing metal, sinking to the shallows of Michael Bay's Armageddon and then digging to the brain-extinction level of the Transformers trilogy."

Other critics were less harsh for Battleship: Writing for Time, Steven James Snyder was somewhat positive because he had low expectations of the film. He wrote, "The creative team behind this ocean-bound thriller decided to fill the narrative black hole with a few ingredients all but absent from today's summer tent poles – namely mystery, nostalgia and a healthy dose of humility" and described it as "an unlikely mix of Independence Day, Pearl Harbor, Jurassic Park and The Hunt for Red October".

Giving it a B+ grade, Lisa Schwarzbaum of Entertainment Weekly said, "For every line of howler dialogue that should have been sunk, there's a nice little scene in which humans have to make a difficult decision. For every stretch of generic sci-fi-via-CGI moviemaking, there's a welcome bit of wit." The Washington Post gave the film a three-star rating out of four commenting it is "an invigorating blast of cinematic adrenaline".

Roger Ebert of the Chicago Sun-Times gave the film 2.5 stars out of 4, praising the climax as "an honest-to-God third act, instead of just settling for nonstop fireballs and explosions, as Bay likes to do. I don't want to spoil it for you. Let's say the Greatest Generation still has the right stuff and leave it at that."

=== Accolades ===
List of awards and nominations
Award	Category	Recipient(s)	Result
Annie Awards	Best Animated Effects in a Live Action Production	Willi Geiger, Rick Hankins, Florent Andorra, Florian Witzel, Aron Bonar	Nominated
Golden Trailer Awards	Best Sound Editing		Nominated
Golden Trailer Awards	Best Summer Blockbuster 2012 TV Spot		Nominated
Houston Film Critics Society	Worst Film		Nominated
Golden Raspberry Awards	Worst Picture		Nominated
Golden Raspberry Awards	Worst Director	Peter Berg	Nominated
Golden Raspberry Awards	Worst Supporting Actor	Liam Neeson	Nominated
Golden Raspberry Awards	Worst Supporting Actress	Brooklyn Decker	Nominated
Golden Raspberry Awards	Worst Supporting Actress	Rihanna	Won
Golden Raspberry Awards	Worst Screenplay	Jon Hoeber and Eric Hoeber	Nominated
Golden Raspberry Awards	Worst Screen Ensemble		Nominated
Saturn Awards	Best Special Effects	Grady Cofer, Pablo Helman, Jeanie King and Burt Dalton	Nominated
Teen Choice Awards	Choice Movie Breakout	Rihanna	Won
Visual Effects Society	Outstanding Visual Effects in a Visual-Effects Driven Film	Grady Cofer, Pablo Helman, Kevin Elam, Glen McIntosh	Nominated
Visual Effects Society	Outstanding FX and Simulation Animation in a Live Action Feature Motion Picture	Florent Andorra, Willi Geiger, Rick Hankins, Florian Witzel	Nominated

== In other media ==
A video game based on the film, titled Battleship, was released in May 2012, to coincide with the film's international release. The game was published by Activision and developed by Double Helix Games for PlayStation 3 and Xbox 360, and developed by Magic Pockets for Wii, Nintendo 3DS, and Nintendo DS.

Hasbro released several new editions of the classic board game, including an update to the regular fleet versus fleet game and a "movie edition", featuring the alien vessels and a card-based play mode.

== See also ==
- American Warships, the mockbuster film released at the same time and featuring one of USS Missouri's sister ships, USS Iowa.
- Under Siege, a 1992 film starring Steven Seagal also set aboard USS Missouri, but filmed on the USS Alabama.
- Battle: Los Angeles, a 2011 film portraying an alien force in direct combat with the U.S. military.
