= Battleship (2012 video game) =

2012 video game

- Developers: Double Helix Games (PS3 & X360); Magic Pockets (Wii, DS & 3DS)
- Publisher: Activision
- Engine: Slayer (game engine)
- Platforms: PlayStation 3; Xbox 360; Wii; Nintendo DS; Nintendo 3DS
- Release: AU: April 18, 2012; EU: April 20, 2012; NA: May 15, 2012
- Genres: First-person shooter (PS3/X360); Turn-based strategy (Wii/DS/3DS)
- Mode: Single-player

Battleship is the name of two video games based on the film of the same name (which in turn is based on the board game Battleship), both of them published by Activision in 2012. It was released for PlayStation 3, Xbox 360, Wii, Nintendo DS, and Nintendo 3DS. The PlayStation 3 and Xbox 360 versions are a first-person shooter developed by Double Helix Games while the Wii, DS and 3DS versions were a turn-based strategy game developed by Magic Pockets.

== Plot ==
Battleship follows elite demolitions specialist Cole Mathis as he clashes against an aquatic-based extra-terrestrial peril in the sand and sea of the beautiful Hawaiian archipelago. He uses his battle command to command the ships to battle against the alien fleet at sea. The human ships at sea are the Nimitz-class carrier USS Ronald Reagan (CVN-76), Iowa-class battleship USS Missouri (BB-63), fictional Ticonderoga-class cruiser USS Yukon, fictional Arleigh Burke-class destroyer USS John Quincy Adams, fictional Oliver Hazard Perry-class frigate USS Chesapeake, and fictional Virginia-class submarine USS Laredo.

The Nintendo versions of the game follows instead the adventures of LCDR. Danny Hunter and LT. Roads and is a turn-based strategy instead of a first-person shooter.

== Reception ==
Reception

Aggregate score
| Aggregator | Score |
|---|---|
| Metacritic | (X360) 38/100 (PS3) 44/100 (WII) 55/100 (3DS) 55/100 |

Review scores
| Publication | Score |
|---|---|
| Destructoid | (X360) 5/10 |
| Eurogamer | (X360/PS3) 4/10 |
| GameSpot | (X360) 3.5/10 |
| Nintendo World Report | (WII) 6/10 (3DS) 5/10 |
| Pocket Gamer | (3DS) 3.5/5 |
| Push Square | (PS3) 3/10 |

=== First-person shooter (PlayStation 3 & Xbox 360) ===
The first-person shooter game for the PlayStation 3 and Xbox 360 has received mostly negative reviews. Aggregating review websites GameRankings and Metacritic gave the Xbox 360 version 40.67% and 38/100 and the PlayStation 3 version 39.43% and 44/100 PlayStation Official Magazine UK remarked "It isn't even the sketchy gameplay that sinks this Battleship – it's the abhorrently commercial objective apparent in every second of rushed gameplay".

=== Turn-based strategy (Wii, DS & 3DS) ===
Reviews for the turn-based strategy game for the Wii, DS and 3DS were significantly more positive, but were nonetheless mixed. Aggregating review websites GameRankings and Metacritic gave the 3DS version 55.83% and 55/100, the Wii version 55.50% and 54/100, and the DS version 40.00%. Nintendo World Report called it "competent", but essentially no more than a second rate variation on Advance Wars. Pocket Gamer gave a more positive review, acknowledging that the game is an Advance Wars copycat but concluding "Those looking to recreate the movie on the go are out of luck here, but if you're after a complex and thoughtful game of naval tactics, Battleship should be right up your galley."
