= Battleship (1996 video game) =

- NA cover art
- Developer: NMS Software Ltd.
- Publisher: Hasbro Interactive
- Platform: Microsoft Windows
- Release: GER: September 30, 1996; NA: November 26, 1996; UK: 1999
- Genre: Action game

Battleship (also known as Battleship: The Classic Naval Warfare Game) is a PC video game developed by NMS Software Ltd. and published by Hasbro Interactive. It was released in 1996 in Germany, 1997 in North America and 1999 in the United Kingdom.

== Gameplay ==
Battleship is a revision of the board game popularised by the Milton Bradley Company. The game contains several variants: 'Classic', which usually follows the turn-based rules of the board game, and the more in-depth 'Ultimate Battleship', where the player manipulates fleets of ships on a larger playing field in real-time. 'Ultimate Battleship' is supported by several modes, including missions and scenarios. Battleship also features local 'hot seat' play, and supports multiplayer games for up to four players over LAN, modem-to-modem, or online using MPlayer.

== Reception ==
Reception

Review scores
Publication	Score
Computer Gaming World	3/5
Computer and Video Games	3/5
GameSpot	6.8
PC PowerPlay	77%
PC Zone	70%

Battleship received a mixed reception. Positive reviews evaluated the game based upon its innovations compared to the board game. Mark Clarkson of Computer Gaming World said the real-time approach of the game was a "pleasant surprise", and "Hasbro has spruced up the old game considerably". Gareth Jones of PC PowerPlay praised the game as "more technical than the board game" with its "deep and complex gameplay, although acknowledged that "apart from the name, it's actually almost nothing like the original board game".

Less favorable reviews of Battleship focused on the lack of depth of particular features. Andy Mitchell of PC Zone said the game's "bells and whistles...ultimately doesn't change the fact that this is still a pretty basic concept wrapped in hi-tech clothing". Moira Muldoon of GameSpot critiqued the Classic mode of the game as having "no strategy", due to the player being unable to turn boats lengthwise, and knowing which type of ship they have hit.
