= Battleships (video game) =

1987 video game

- Developer: Elite Systems
- Publisher: Elite Systems
- Platforms: ZX Spectrum, Commodore 64, Amstrad CPC, BBC Micro, Amiga, Atari ST
- Release: EU: 1987
- Genre: Turn-based strategy
- Mode: Single-player

Battleships is the international title of a video game based on the classic board game. The object is to sink the opponent's entire fleet (six ships) without him sinking the player's fleet first.

== Gameplay ==
This version of the game had the particularity of allowing fire by salvos of up to 24 shots, depending on the number of unsunk ships the player had. After all shots were placed by the player, a scene showing a ship firing its guns at the enemy fleet was played, showing hits and damage. The game could be played in Hotseat, since each player's fleet placement was never shown after the game had started proper.

There also have been other versions of the battleship game for various consoles and handheld devices, including Battleship.
