= Viktor Antonov (artist) =

Bulgarian video game artist (1972–2025)

- Виктор Руменов Антонов
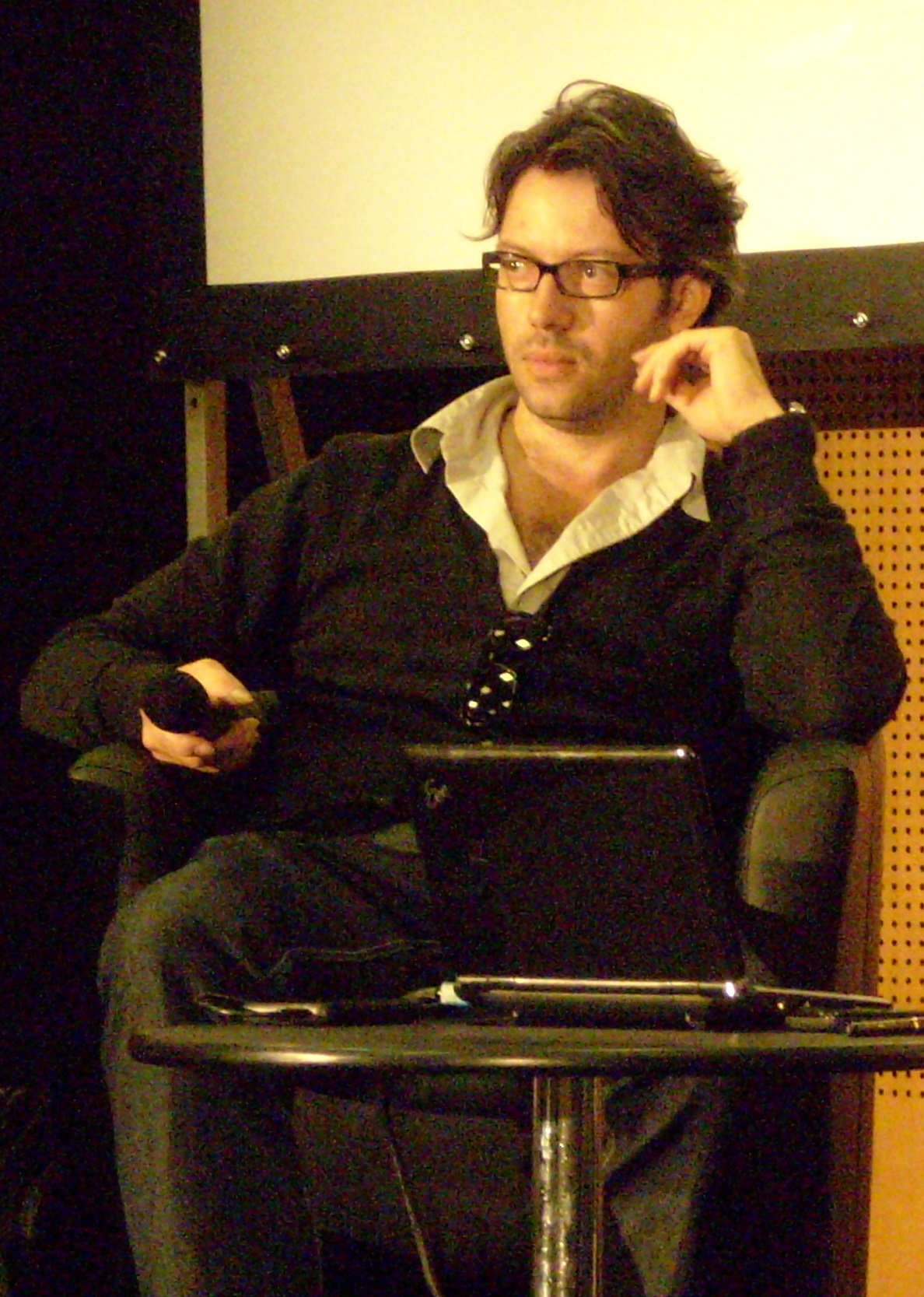
- Antonov at Paris Games Week in 2010
- Born: 5 February 1972; Sofia, Bulgaria
- Died: 7 February 2025 (aged 53); Paris, France
- Education: ArtCenter College of Design
- Years active: 1997—2025

Viktor Antonov (Bulgarian: Виктор Антонов; 5 February 1972 – 7 February 2025) was a Bulgarian artist, video game designer, writer, and worldbuilder who worked on numerous first-person shooter (FPS) games. In 2017, Blake Hester wrote for Vice that Antonov "has created disturbing, memorable, and unique worlds" which "conjure images of cyberpunk metropolises and grim London alleyways."

Antonov's first game credits were at Xatrix Entertainment, for Redneck Rampage (1997), Redneck Deer Huntin' (1998), Redneck Rampage Rides Again (1998), and Kingpin: Life of Crime (1999). At Valve, he worked on Counter-Strike: Source (2004), Half-Life 2 (2004), and Half-Life 2: Lost Coast (2005). As art director of Half-Life 2, he principally designed its dystopian setting of City 17: a decaying Eastern European city occupied by the Combine alien empire, featuring Soviet-era Brutalist buildings and alien structures similar to panopticons which constitute the Combine's surveillance state. Antonov was temporarily art director of Valve's Team Fortress 2 (2007).

While developing Dark Messiah of Might and Magic (2006) and Dishonored (2012) at Arkane Studios, Antonov worked on films and wrote a graphic novel. He principally designed Dishonored's setting of Dunwall, a labyrinthine dystopian city with steampunk Victorian and Gothic buildings; it and City 17 are often considered some of the best worlds ever made for video games. Finally, he had design roles on many ZeniMax Media-owned games: Wolfenstein: The New Order (2014), Fallout 4 (2015), Doom (2016), Dishonored 2 (2016), The Elder Scrolls: Legends (2017), and Prey (2017).

== Early life ==
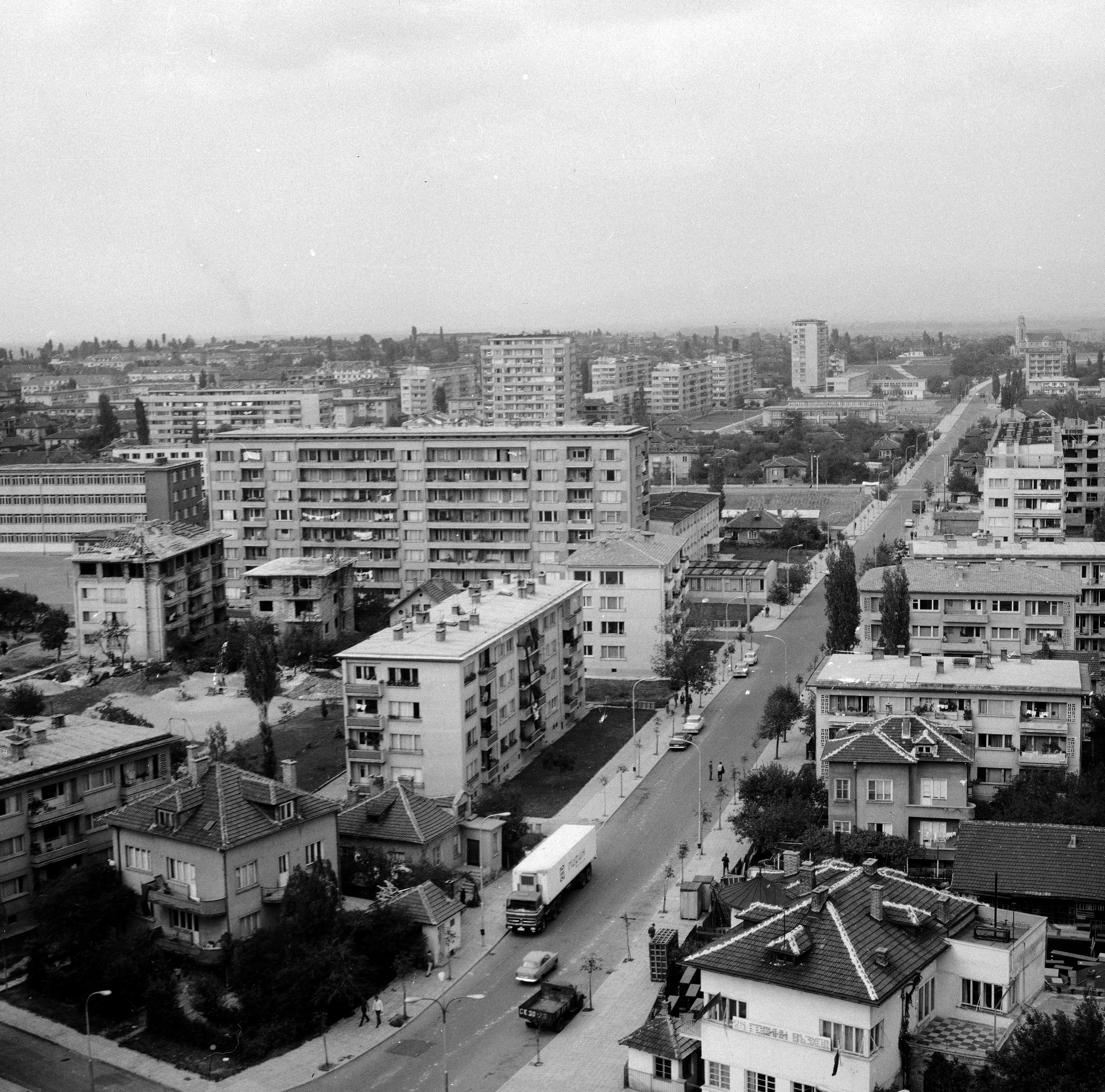
A street in Sofia in 1969, during Bulgaria's socialist era

Viktor Antonov was born in Sofia, Bulgaria, on 5 February 1972. He later stated his lifelong passion for architecture and worldbuilding—the creation of detailed fictional worlds—originated from his childhood living in Sofia whilst Bulgaria was a socialist state politically aligned with the Soviet Union. The country's poor economy meant large areas of the city were typically empty, letting him easily break into buildings and engage in "urban exploration" inside them; this gave him an appreciation of their designs.

Antonov moved to Paris at age 17, and then to Los Angeles some time later. He engaged in "very rigorous" studies of design at the ArtCenter College of Design in Pasadena, California, later saying it was "one of the harshest schools there are". He received a degree in transportation design, and started working as an architect of concept cars. He also worked in TV commercial production, planning to enter the special effects industry in L.A. However, Antonov decided to follow video game design after getting a job at local developer Xatrix Entertainment (now Gray Matter Interactive).

== Career ==
=== 1990s: Xatrix Entertainment ===
Antonov's first job in the gaming industry was as a painter of the maps found in Xatrix Entertainment's 1997 PC FPS Redneck Rampage. He then worked on three more Xatrix titles for the PC that came out the year after: Redneck Deer Huntin' and Redneck Rampage Rides Again, sequels to the 1997 game; and Quake II Mission Pack: The Reckoning, an expansion pack for the 1997 FPS Quake II.

Antonov followed these by working as a level designer for the 1999 PC FPS Kingpin: Life of Crime, which has an art deco aesthetic. The game takes place in a major city, so before its levels were designed, he explored L.A. to get an understanding of city layouts. He later claimed Kingpin's game world was "the first realistic city" created in the Quake II game engine. That someone could be employed by a major game studio as both an artist and level designer, Antonov said, was because "at this time, the video game industry did not have clearly define[d] positions, and an artist could create entire worlds".

=== 1999—2006: Valve ===
==== Counter-Strike: Source and Half-Life 2 (2004) ====
While at Xatrix, Antonov formed a creative partnership with fellow artist Aaron Barber. The latter was soon hired by Seattle-based developer Valve, and Antonov followed him there in 1999. The company hired Antonov after being impressed by his advanced level design for Kingpin. At his new job, he first worked on two FPS games which released in 2004: the online multiplayer tactical shooter Counter-Strike: Source, released for the PC; and the sequel to the 1998 sci-fi game Half-Life, Half-Life 2, which was a blockbuster success upon its release for PCs and consoles.

==== City 17 ====
During the development of Half-Life 2, Antonov was promoted from a concept artist to being the game's art director. He was the principal designer of its dystopian setting of City 17: a decaying Eastern European city in an unspecified location, occupied by the Combine, an alien empire that invaded Earth (during and after the events of the first Half-Life) and established an oppressive world government.

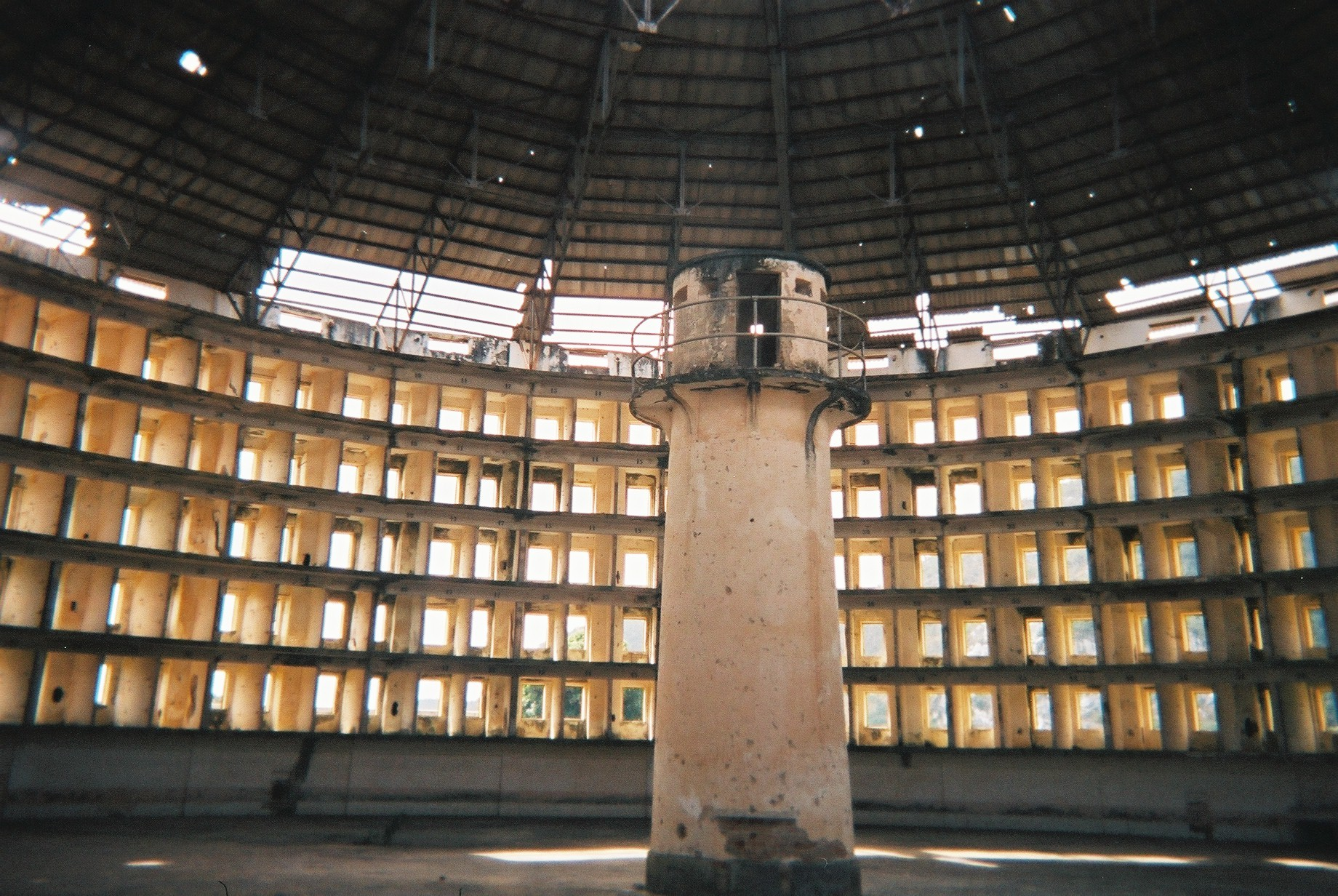
City 17 is built like a series of panopticons: prisons in which a guard can monitor every inmate at once, but the inmates cannot tell if they are being watched.

City 17 features numerous Soviet-era concrete buildings in the Brutalist style, as well as structures constituting the Combine's surveillance state which are built like a series of panopticons: a type of prison in which a single guard can monitor every prisoner simultaneously from a central tower, but each prisoner is not able to see whether they are being watched. Ted Litchfield writes for PC Gamer that the Combine's "invasive, angular, [and] alien" architecture "latch[es] onto the human architecture underneath like tumors".

In the middle of City 17 is the Combine's Citadel, a skyscraper far taller than any of its surroundings, at one to five miles high (according to fan estimates). The empire uses it as a stronghold, to expand its army, and to surveil the city's residents. Half-Life 2's player character Gordon Freeman must travel to and enter the Citadel to damage the Combine's infrastructure.

Antonov used Half-Life 2 as an opportunity to game explore an urban Eastern European setting. He felt that such a setting was underused in popular fiction, and that putting it in Half-Life 2 would lead to a "specific, as opposed to generic" aesthetic. He successfully pitched the idea to Valve president Gabe Newell and others on the team by telling them: "Let’s take video games outside of the bunkers and the corridors and the hallways, and let’s have a whole world that feels real and very intense. And then when any event happens in this world, the impact will be much stronger." After this, City 17's architecture and atmosphere took inspiration from Soviet-era Sofia, Belgrade, and St. Petersburg—mainly Sofia—as well as Franz Kafka's writings and George Orwell's novel Nineteen Eighty-Four. Antonov collected images of the Gare d'Austerlitz train station in Paris to use as reference for the station the player starts the game from.

Antonov made sure City 17 made sense not only in terms of level design, but as an actual living space, with "coherence and consistency" in street layouts and architecture "that shouldn’t be noticed by the players", but nonetheless is subconsciously felt by them. He also had to determine how the game's environments would interact with the advanced lighting technology offered by Valve's new Source game engine. Half-Life 2 writer Marc Laidlaw said that Antonov served as a bridge between "the daily practical ‘Yes, but how do I actually build it?’ needs of [the] level designers, and my vague, atmospheric, ‘It should sorta feel like’ suggestions"—as well as between the literary themes of the story and the design of City 17. Antonov later said that the game's development provided him a far more effective education on design than the ArtCenter College of Design did.

==== Reception to Antonov's work ====
Antonov's concept art for the final version of the Citadel skyscraper. Its drastically tall design and placement in Half-Life 2's world make it an orientating landmark and recurring source of motivation for the player.

Laidlaw later said he was thankful Antonov was on the Half-Life 2 team, because his experience in recreating Eastern Europe helped them stand out from sci-fi's "wearisome influences of Star Wars and Blade Runner and Alien".

In 2017, Blake Hester wrote for Vice magazine that City 17 as a setting "is often regarded as being fantastic". It has been listed as one of the best or most iconic cities in gaming by PC Gamer, TheGamer, and DualShockers. Konstantinos Dimopoulos, a game designer who produced an unofficial map of the city in 2018, claimed that it is "one of the most successful, coherent, economically designed, and memorable urban environments ever crafted". As an example, he notes that the Citadel's imposing height and reoccurring appearances in the game make it "act as a major landmark that keeps players both oriented [in the game world] and focused on their goal". City 17 was made the setting of Half-Life 2's 2020 sequel Half-Life Alyx.

==== Half-Life 2: Lost Coast (2005) and Team Fortress 2 (2007) ====
Antonov worked on Half-Life 2: Lost Coast, an additional level for Half-Life 2 released in 2005 as a free download for owners of the game. His last credit at Valve was for the online multiplayer FPS Team Fortress 2 (2007), temporarily working as its art director until his friend Moby Francke joined the company, at which point Antonov handed the role to him. Antonov left the company in 2006. He later explained that he was disappointed he had "spent six years of my life on one single project", and he did not care to work on small-scale episodic games, which Valve made with Half-Life 2: Episode One (2006) and Episode Two (2007). He wanted to make more "AAA" games like the original Half-Life 2, at a job in Europe which gave more artistic independence and "maneuverability" than Valve.

=== 2006—2012: Arkane Studios and independent projects ===
==== Dark Messiah of Might and Magic (2006) and cancelled projects ====
Antonov joined French developer Arkane Studios. He was a level designer for their 2006 action role-playing game (RPG) Dark Messiah of Might And Magic, helping his team replicate Valve's process of making levels for Half-Life 2. Around 2007 and 2008, Arkane began developing an officially licensed Half-Life sequel, centered around the alien zombies that infest the ghost town of Ravenholm in Half-Life 2. Antonov continued helping Arkane replicate Valve's design process. The project was soon scrapped, because they did not develop it in the time that Valve wanted, and Valve was having trouble deciding where Half-Life as a series should go while making its episodic entries. Arkane's then-president Raphaël Colantonio has said that Antonov's work on the project "was pivotal to what would become Arkane later", as "he trained us in all of [Valve's] practices in terms of art, in terms of how to think of a level, [and] how to think of architecture". Antonov was a level designer for the studio's next project, an FPS titled The Crossing, for which he created a sci-fi version of Paris. In 2009, this project was also cancelled, as Arkane was unable to secure financing for it, as well as a publisher that would let them retain the game's intellectual property rights in the future. However, elements of The Crossing later came to fruition in Arkane's 2021 FPS Deathloop.

==== Film works and graphic novel ====
Antonov worked on the 2006 film Renaissance directed by Christian Volkman. He then wrote and illustrated the graphic novel The Colony: A Structure Celebrating the Triumphs of Technology, published in 2010. Antonov was also a co-writer and production designer of the 2011 French sci-fi film The Prodigies.

==== Development of Dishonored (2012) ====
Starting in 2009, Antonov was the visual design director of Arkane Studios' Dishonored, a first-person stealth action-adventure game that released in 2012. During the game's development, he worked with the other heads of its art team, Sébastien Mitton and Jean-Luc Monnet, to restructure the team and improve their creative processes, making what Colantonio has called "a world-class team of artists that could rival any top team in the world". The game was in pre-production for three years, as every asset in Dishonored's world was created specifically for the project, rather than being borrowed from asset libraries.

The team at Arkane wanted the game to have a "contemporary and cool" setting with a "real", "politically incorrect" tone. Antonov specifically wanted to make a realistic game with a retrofuturistic aesthetic set in the past. In 2012, he told Eurogamer that the modern gaming industry was not exploring that type of style—an exception being 2007's BioShock—and was focusing too much on war games, and New York City as a setting. Furthermore, he wanted Dishonored to have a specific, stripped-down gameplay experience, saying modern games contained too many mechanics from different genres, like "narration, music, contemplation, [and] shooting", which caused them to "lose the experience" originally intended by their designers. While clarifying he was "not a harsh critic of games", Antonov felt "artists and art directors should make their own life a little bit harder by pushing management to take more artistic risks, and use [their] technology [at] a better, higher level".

==== Dunwall ====
One of the Dishonored enemies you encounter are the Tallboys who clear the infected masses are primarily inspired from the London stilt walkers

Antonov was the principal designer of the city of Dunwall, Dishonored's steampunk dystopian setting described as an "oily" labyrinth of brickwork buildings. The city, whose economy is centered around the whaling industry, is governed by an authoritarian monarchist regime filled with officials too "callous" to deal with its residents' problems. During the events of the game, Dunwall is experiencing a plague virus which originated from its overwhelming rat population. It has significant wealth inequality, and the plague has trapped its lower class inside the city, "condemned to die by either an infection in the body or a knife in the heart", Levi Winslow writes for Kotaku. The city features a mix of Victorian and Gothic architecture, and was inspired by British cities, mainly London and Edinburgh, as they were from the mid-1800s to 1930. Antonov stated that that Britain is "both exotic and familiar to Americans and to Europeans, so it was just about perfect".

==== Art and design of Dishonored ====
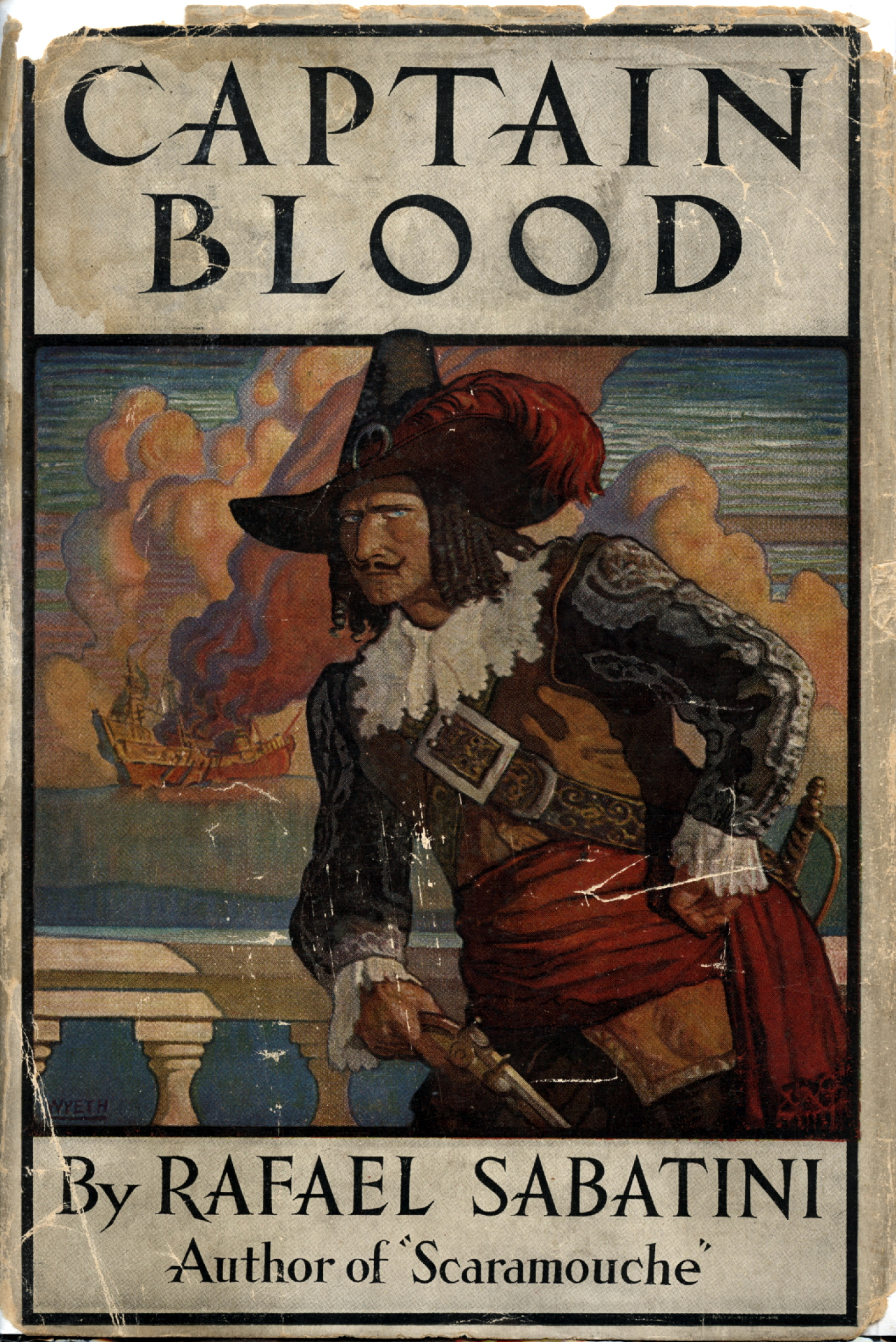
Dishonored's character designs were inspired by illustrations made for old adventure novels like Captain Blood (1922).

Antonov's team was also inspired by older stealth action games developed by Ion Storm and Looking Glass Studios; Robert Purchese wrote for Eurogamer that this likely included Thief: The Dark Project (1998) and Deus Ex (2000). The game's "stylised" character designs were inspired by the "flamboyant" illustrations made for older adventure novels, especially ones about pirates such as Captain Blood (1922).

In some cases, rather than using industry artists, Dishonored's developers hired industrial engineers, industrial designers, and other professionals in non-industry fields—including illustrators from Russia—to design the game's assets, as they felt this would make Dunwall's exotic, industrial scenery feel more authentic. For example, Antonov and Sébastien Mitton tracked down a specific textile carpet designer in Russia to have them make key art for the game. Most of the character design was done by professional anatomists.

Antonov's main goal in designing Dunwall was "to reduce the scope and increase the density of experience" in exploring game worlds. Inside the city's "claustrophobic" areas, players can navigate small spaces like the underside of a table, and are able to reach and enter any location they can see while playing. Controlling Corvo Attano, an assassin given magical abilities, the player is aided in exploring small spaces by possessing any rats they see in the world, and can use the rat's burrows as shortcuts between locations. These locales have a large amount of verticality, the player being able to travel from "roof to balcony to street level", and are rendered with more detail than was previously seen in games like Dishonored.

==== Reception to Antonov's work ====
Upon Dishonored's release, Antonov stated that he felt his work on Dunwall surpassed his work on City 17: "for me, [...] Dunwall is far superior by quantity of design, quality of design, and precision". PC Gamer and Rock Paper Shotgun have since listed Dunwall as one of the best cities in gaming. In 2022, Levi Winslow wrote that it is the most "vivid and memorable" city they had ever explored in a game, "so environmentally and thematically intertwined that it gives me the creeps"; Dishonored makes significant usage of environmental storytelling, showing the effects of the plague on Dunwall by having most of its rooms be unoccupied, the presence of fresh food and burning fireplaces indicating they were abandoned by their occupants shortly prior to the events of the game. Much of the city is littered with corpses that the rats can be seen feasting on.

=== 2012—2017: ZeniMax Media subsidiaries ===
Antonov also worked on Dishonored's DLC. Following this, Antonov became the visual design director for American company ZeniMax Media, meaning he worked on projects developed by ZeniMax's subsidiary developers—including Bethesda Game Studios, MachineGames, id Software, and Arkane—and made sure "the level of visual design and fiction" coming out of them was "the highest possible", Robert Purchese wrote.

In 2012, a ZeniMax subsidiary named BattleCry Studios was founded in Austin, Texas, by developer Rich Vogel. Antonov worked on their planned debut release, a team-based multiplayer FPS titled BattleCry. In 2015, Bethesda Softworks, the planned publisher of BattleCry, revealed their "concerns" about the viability of the game releasing, and it was cancelled in 2017.

Antonov was the additional art director of MachineGames' Wolfenstein: The New Order (2014); a visual designer of Dire Wolf Digital's The Elder Scrolls: Legends (2017); and a consultant on Bethesda Game Studios' Fallout 4 (2015), id Software's Doom (2016), and Arkane's Dishonored 2 (2016) and Prey (2017).

=== 2020s: Eschatology Entertainment ===
In 2022, Antonov co-founded game developer Eschatology Entertainment alongside Boris Nikolaev, Dmytro Kostiukevych, and Fuad Kuliev. Upon Antonov's death, they were working on Guns of Eschaton (codenamed "Project DG"), a game about "a gunslinger exploring a world 'on the verge of destruction'".

== Death and legacy ==
On 7 February 2025, Antonov, at age 53, died in Paris from undisclosed causes. The news was first revealed on Marc Laidlaw's Instagram story a week later, and was confirmed in a statement from Eschatology Entertainment. Many of Antonov's former colleagues paid tribute to him on social media. Laidlaw and Raphaël Colantonio respectively wrote that he was a "visionary" who was "instrumental to the success of Arkane Studios". Ex-Valve writer Chet Faliszek said that he was a "breath of fresh air at Valve", and Arkane designer Harvey Smith praised his "dry, devastating wit". Valve artist Laura Dubuk recalled he was helpful as her mentor when she started at the company.

Multiple outlets noted Antonov's influence on the games industry. Aftermath writer Luke Plunkett said that he was key "in defining the visual style of some of most visually-striking video games" ever, which, as John Walker wrote for Kotaku, are "some of the most loved games of all time". Engadget writer Igor Bonifacic claimed, "if there's one person who helped make Half-Life 2 so memorable, it's Antonov", and for Rock Paper Shotgun, Edwin Evans-Thirlwell said that City 17 "continues to influence more pessimistic sci-fi game developers today".

== Works ==
=== Video games ===
Game	Release	Developer	Credit(s)	Ref.
Redneck Rampage	1997	Xatrix Entertainment	map painter	
Redneck Deer Huntin'	1998	Xatrix Entertainment		
Quake II Mission Pack: The Reckoning	1998	Xatrix Entertainment		
Redneck Rampage Rides Again	1998	Xatrix Entertainment		
Kingpin: Life of Crime	1999	Xatrix Entertainment	level designer	
Counter-Strike: Source	2004	Valve		
Half-Life 2	2004	Valve	concept artist, art director	
Half-Life 2: Lost Coast	2005	Valve		
Dark Messiah of Might and Magic	2006	Arkane Studios	level designer	
Team Fortress 2	2007	Valve	art director (temporary)	
Dishonored	2012	Arkane Studios	visual design director	
Wolfenstein: The New Order	2014	MachineGames	additional art director	
Fallout 4	2015	Bethesda Game Studios	consultant	
Dishonored 2	2016	Arkane Studios	consultant	
DOOM	2016	id Software	consultant	
Prey	2017	Arkane Studios	consultant	
The Elder Scrolls: Legends	2017	Dire Wolf Digital	visual designer	
Guns of Eschaton	2026	Eschatology Entertainment	art director	
Life Beyond	Upcoming	Darewise Entertainment	art director	
Untitled Half-Life game	Canceled	Arkane Studios	level designer	
The Crossing	Canceled	Arkane Studios	level designer	
BattleCry	Canceled	Bethesda Game Studios Austin		

=== Films ===
Film	Release	Director	Credit(s)
Renaissance	2006	Christian Volkman	
The Prodigies	2011	Antoine Charreyron	co-writer, production designer
