= Call of Duty 2 =

2005 video game

- Developer: Infinity Ward (Note: Ported to Mac OS X by i5works.)
- Publisher: Activision (Note: Mac OS X port published by Aspyr.)
- Director: Jason West
- Producer: Vince Zampella
- Designers: Zied Rieke; Steve Fukuda
- Programmer: Eric Pierce
- Artists: Michael Boon; Ursula Escher
- Writer: Michael Schiffer
- Composer: Graeme Revell
- Series: Call of Duty
- Engine: IW engine
- Platforms: Microsoft Windows; Xbox 360; Mobile; Mac OS X
- Release: October 25, 2005: Microsoft Windows; NA: October 25, 2005; EU: November 4, 2005; Xbox 360; NA: November 22, 2005; EU: December 2, 2005; Mobile; WW: January 5, 2006; Mac OS X; NA: May 26, 2006; EU: July 5, 2006
- Genre: First-person shooter
- Modes: Single-player, multiplayer

Call of Duty 2 is a 2005 first-person shooter game developed by Infinity Ward and published by Activision in most regions of the world. It is the second installment of the Call of Duty series. Announced by Activision on April 7, 2005, the game was released for Microsoft Windows on October 25, 2005, and as a launch title for the Xbox 360 on November 22, 2005. Other versions were eventually released for Mac OS X, mobile phones, and Pocket PCs.

The game is set during World War II and the campaign mode is experienced through the perspectives of four soldiers: one in the Red Army, one in the United States Army, and two in the British Army. It contains four individual campaigns, split into three stories, with a total of 27 missions. Many features were added and changed from the original Call of Duty, notably regenerating health and an icon that indicates a nearby grenade about to explode.

The game drew critical praise, particularly for the graphics, sound, and the regenerating health system. The Xbox 360 version sold more than 250,000 copies in its first week, more than two million copies by January 2008, and nearly six million copies by November 2013. Retrospective reviews have been positive, with critics praising the game's improvements over its predecessor and innovations that become the series' mainstays, although some have found it dated. It is considered to be one of the Xbox 360's best games and one of the best video games of all time.

== Gameplay ==
The Pointe du Hoc D-Day mission in the single-player campaign depicts U.S. Rangers going ashore in LCVP landing craft.

Call of Duty 2 is a first-person shooter that has a single-player story mode and a multiplayer mode. The player takes on the roles of several Allied protagonists in specific missions during World War II. The player can crouch and lie prone, and is able to scale low walls and other obstacles.

The player can carry two firearms, and may swap them for others found on the battlefield. A gun's iron sights can be used to aim more accurately. Fragmentation and smoke grenades can be carried. Emplaced weapons such as machine guns and flak cannons are available in some locations. Some missions place the player in control of a tank.

A compass on the heads-up display (HUD) shows allies, enemies, and markers that indicate locations the player must reach, areas to defend, or enemy artillery pieces or tanks that the player must plant explosives on to disable.

The player has binoculars. Generally ignored during infantry-centric missions, they are useful for scouting and vital to the long-range use of the Crusader tanks and a mission in which the player must direct artillery fire to defend a town.

Should the player take severe damage, the screen will turn red and the sound of the character's heartbeat will increase in volume; these indicate that the player's health is low. Health is only restored through automatic recharging when the player is not taking fire. Some attacks will kill the player instantly, such as nearby explosions by grenades or shells. A player who dies restarts from the last checkpoint.

In April 2006, Infinity Ward released Call of Duty 2 Radiant, which allows a player to create their own multiplayer or single-player maps. The mapmaker includes Maya plug-in support, an effects editor, and an asset manager that allows custom models to be made and imported into the game, as well as custom effects.

=== Campaign ===
Call of Duty 2 contains three individual campaigns, fought in the roles of four World War II soldiers, for a total of 27 missions. The game has four difficulty levels: Easy, Regular, Hardened, and Veteran.

=== Multiplayer ===
Call of Duty 2 features several game types: Deathmatch, Team Deathmatch, Search & Destroy, Capture the Flag and Headquarters. The maps include Normandy, Africa, and Russia. Each team can choose a variety of weapons, depending on the map. Players can choose between American soldiers, Soviet soldiers, and British soldiers for the Allied forces, while the Axis forces must play as German soldiers.

Each PC multiplayer server can hold a maximum of 64 players, while the limit is eight players on Xbox. In the Xbox 360 version, players can play on Xbox Live and get new map packs. There are 13 official maps, including three remakes from the original Call of Duty. There are three extra map packs (Bonus Pack, Skirmish Pack, and Invasion Pack) that add a total of eight maps.

== Plot ==
=== Soviet campaign ===
The player controls Private Vasili Koslov of the 13th Guards Rifle Division in December 1941, initially involved in the defense of Moscow from the advancing German troops. The next level involves the destruction of a German stronghold in Stalingrad during early December 1942. The next objective involves battling for strongholds throughout Stalingrad throughout the middle of December 1942, including re-connecting cut telephone wires and re-capturing the rail-yard and train-station. The final mission takes place during the final Soviet offensive in Stalingrad in January 1943, which involves the re-capture and defense of city blocks and Stalingrad city hall.

=== British campaign ===
The player controls a British soldier, Sergeant John Davis of the 7th Armoured Division in North Africa, led by Captain Price. The first level in early November 1942, has the player taking part in a sneak attack on German Afrika Korps troops, ending with the destruction of a German supply station. The next level has the player defending a town from overwhelming numbers of Germans sending counter attacks from North, West, South and East; finally achieving victory by destroying much of the German tank force using artillery. This is followed by the Second Battle of El Alamein, during which the player has to fight through several trenches, machine gun nests, 88mm Flak 36 guns and finally taking the German field headquarters. The assault on El Dabaa to intercept the remaining Germans in Egypt and destroy several 88mm guns soon follows, ending the first British campaign. An addendum to the second set of missions has the player taking on the role of a British tank commander, David Welsh, while engaging German forces in Libya. The first mission of the third campaign in Toujane, Tunisia, has the player immediately under fire, holding a house until they break out and rendezvous with the second squad. They then retake Toujane with reinforcements the next day all before assaulting Matmata. The final British campaign takes place during the Battle for Caen as part of Operation Overlord.

=== American campaign ===
As Corporal Bill Taylor of the 2nd Ranger Battalion, the player starts off by playing a part in D-Day, at the assault of Pointe du Hoc, to destroy a German artillery battery, and hold it against a massive German counter-offensive in the following mission. Soon after, the player captures a nearby town and serves as a sniper against mortar crews until reinforcements arrive. The second objective is focused on Hill 400, involving the capture of Bergstein, a disastrous charge at Hill 400's bunkers and the defense against the German counterattack, with the player again performing sniper work against German mortar teams, destroying enemy armor, and generally holding the hill against a massive counter-attack, all the while burdened by artillery and overwhelming numbers of German soldiers. The final mission is set amongst the Americans in the Rhine River crossing into Germany. It begins as one of the few missions with the player immediately under fire, providing cover fire against the Germans until reaching the riverbanks and then fighting through most of the town. The final fight has the player defeat two German Tiger I tanks.

=== Ending ===
The end credits depict the dramatic rescue of Captain Price from the Germans by a group of American soldiers. After the credits end, the words "No cows were harmed in the making of this game" appear, as in the original Call of Duty. This is a reference to the dead cattle visible in the Normandy missions.

== Development ==
On April 7, 2005, Activision announced that Infinity Ward was developing Call of Duty 2, set for release in fall 2005 for PC. It had been speculated that Infinity Ward was developing the sequel at the same time as Gray Matter Studios developed Call of Duty: United Offensive. Infinity Ward president Grant Collier said:

"Our team at Infinity Ward is committed to thrusting gamers into the heat of battle like no other, taking players on a thrill-ride of adrenaline that leaves everyone gasping for air. In Call of Duty 2, we are creating the most intense and realistic action game imaginable with a stunning visual atmosphere and an advanced technology that delivers an unprecedented level of authenticity".

The press release said players would engage enemies in a less linear battlefield, tackle the major battles chronologically, and use squad tactics not available in previous Call of Duty games. Infinity Ward also confirmed making a "Battle Chatter System", similar to Medal of Honor: Pacific Assault, where squad members converse to create situational awareness.

The game engine—proprietary IW engine—is a modified version of id Tech 3, which was used in the first Call of Duty game. With the new game engine, Infinity Ward expanded the scope of combat to deliver a realistic battlefield experience and improved the visuals. The developers were able to cloud visibility with smoke from smoke grenades and create weather effects like dusty sandstorms and whiteout blizzard.

The game was known to "let players experience four individual soldier stories as they overcome insurmountable odds in multiple campaigns. Players have the freedom to follow each of the four storylines through for the ultimate character-driven experience, or they can engage in the historic battles chronologically for quick hitting action. Squads now have the freedom to take on a variety of mission objectives, on expansive battlefields that allow for multiple paths and the ability to utilize actual combat tactics like outflanking and fire and maneuver capabilities".

Call of Duty 2 was going to be more immersive than the original Call of Duty. Vince Zampella, creative director of Infinity Ward, said, "We didn't want to take any of the parts out that made Call of Duty so good. But there were a couple of things that we admit could have been done better". A demo of the game showed a more open gameplay style and a better AI for the enemies, who would actively go after the player. There are a set number of enemies set on the map that will begin reacting to the player's presence once the first shot has been fired. Groups of enemies farther away send units up to see what is happening and add to the combat while enemies directly in front of the player will join in and take cover quickly.

Infinity Ward spent a lot of time on WWII battlefields, which led them to scrap whole levels for parts of the game that took place in France, since they found the location very different from what they imagined.

One of the details the team added are post-war effects that continue on the battlefield throughout the game, where dust and smoke continue to roll through the streets, clouding up vision, and junk and debris scattered everywhere. The game has sound attenuation, with a 5.1 surround sound system, and context sensitive dialog, with a total of twenty-thousand lines of dialog. Each of the soldiers fighting alongside the player will call out the position of enemy soldiers, warn of flank attacks, and help out in ways that were not possible in the first game of the series. Zampella said, "We really wanted realistic battle chatter going that's not only entertaining, but actually adds to the gaming experience. So now you'll hear your guys telling you that there's [sic] two guys hiding behind that rusty car in the street or that there are people on the second floor of a building".

A small grayed-out grenade icon appears in the center of the screen when the player is near a grenade, with an arrow pointing in the direction of the grenade. Enemies can sometimes seem to be dead when they are not, where the enemy can still wield his side arm and fire at the player, known as Last Stand, which would later become a perk available to players in the multiplayer of subsequent games.

The game was showcased in E3 in 2005 and was announced as a launch title for the upcoming Xbox 360.

The game's budget was $14.5 million. Development time was 2 years with 75 people. Despite being first on the new Xbox 360 platform, the game was developed with no mandatory overtime or weekend work.

== Reception ==
Reception

Aggregate score
Aggregator	Score
Metacritic	(PC) 86/100 (X360) 89/100

Review scores
Publication	Score
1Up.com	(X360) A
Eurogamer	(X360) 7/10
GamePro	(X360) 5/5 (PC) 4.5/5
GameSpot	(X360) 8.8/10 (PC) 8.8/10
GameSpy	(PC) 5/5 (X360) 4.5/5
IGN	(X360) 9.0/10 (PC) 8.5/10
Official Xbox Magazine (US)	9.0/10
X-Play	(PC) 5/5

Call of Duty 2 received "generally positive" reviews, according to review aggregator website Metacritic. The graphics and sound were widely praised and the reactions to the regenerating health system were mostly positive, with reviewers from GameSpot and GamePro calling it an improvement over the previous health bar system.

For the Xbox 360 version, IGN's Douglass C. Perry described the presentation as "classy and well-produced", and said the graphics were some of the best on the Xbox 360 at its launch. He called the sound effects "unbelievable", whilst the gameplay was described as containing an "enormous amount of action". GameSpot reviewer Bob Colayco summarized his review by stating that Call of Duty 2 has "smooth, detailed graphics and great sound", as well as praising the artificial intelligence, realism, and variety in the campaign. GamePro called the game "breathtaking", and commended the game for its "strikingly realistic detail on weapons and walls, emphasized by normal mapping, exceptional shading and lighting, specular highlights, and some absolutely phenomenal particle effects". GameSpy editor Will Tuttle called it "One of the finest FPSs ever created. Thanks to a combination of sharp visuals, teeth-rattling sound effects, and tricky enemy AI, you'll be on the edge of your seat from the moment you're dropped into combat until your dying breath".

For the PC version, IGN editor Tom McNamara was impressed with the presentation and graphics, describing them as "Excellent" and "smooth" respectively. He also said the graphics did not suffer "from also being developed for the 360". McNamara also praised the sound, describing it as "sad music, encompassing battle noise, and excellent voice work". Bob Colayco of GameSpot also reviewed the PC version of the game, as he did its Xbox 360 counterpart. Colayco again commended the sound, calling the presentation of the game "excellent", as well as praising the aggression of the artificial intelligence. Unlike in his review of the Xbox 360 version, Colayco felt the multiplayer aspect was "fun". His main critique was for performance, stating "performance can chug at times". GameSpy's Sal Accardo noted "Instead of feeling like a stale retread [of the original Call of Duty] or losing steam halfway through, it manages to be a blast from start to finish". GamesRadar' Joshua Latendresse called the single-player campaign "stunning" and cited that the multiplayer was even better.

Despite this praise, McNamara of IGN commented that he finds implementing regenerating health to be "a little troublesome", and that it allows players to "experience a kind of combat only a mythical super-soldier could withstand" which, therefore, "propels the game from gritty authenticity to John Woo fantasy". GameSpot's Colayco was critical of the game's pricing, stating it had a "higher pricepoint than its PC counterpart". He also complained that the multiplayer aspect could only support eight players. The PC version multiplayer was criticized as being a step back from that of Call of Duty: United Offensive.

Call of Duty 2 was the most popular launch title on the Xbox 360, with 200,000 units sold in its first week of availability. 77% of people who purchased an Xbox 360 also purchased the game, which contributed to its high sales. As of July 2006, 1.4 million copies of the game had been sold on the Xbox 360. By January 2008, the game had sold 2 million copies. By November 2013, the game had sold 5.9 million copies.

The editors of Computer Games Magazine named Call of Duty 2 the seventh-best computer game of 2005. They called it "the ultimate WWII shooter".

During the 9th Annual Interactive Achievement Awards, the Academy of Interactive Arts & Sciences nominated Call of Duty 2 for "Overall Game of the Year", "Console Game of the Year", "First-Person Action Game of the Year", "Outstanding Achievement in Online Gameplay", and "Outstanding Achievement in Visual Engineering".

=== Retrospective reviews ===
Retrospective assessments of Call of Duty 2 have been mostly positive. Critics have praised the game for its campaign, impressive set pieces, gameplay, multiplayer, and innovations over its predecessor that became mainstays in subsequent games in the series, including health regeneration, smoke grenades, and a grenade damage indicator. Sam Loveridge of GamesRadar+ argued that Call of Duty 2 was "the foundation for the series' rapid rise to dominance". It has been called one of the Xbox 360's best games, one that showcased the console's technical achievements. Others have criticized the game as dated and noted the limitations of the multiplayer on the Xbox 360, which allowed only eight players in matches. In lists ranking the series' games, Call of Duty 2 has generally placed between ten and fifteen, although others have placed it in the top five, with the staff of NME ranking it number two behind Call of Duty 4: Modern Warfare (2007).

== Advertisement controversy ==
A television advertisement for Call of Duty 2 was the subject of some controversy in 2006. The commercial, created by a Los Angeles animation studio Rhythm and Hues Studios, depicted a first-person view of events that were supposed to transpire during the game, rather than scenes from the game itself. Some consumers felt that the advertisements were misleading, and in February 2006 the United Kingdom's Advertising Standards Authority (ASA) demanded that networks remove the advertisements after three consumers filed complaints of false advertising. According to ASA spokesperson Donna Mitchell, "Viewers felt that the ad was misleading because the quality of graphics was superior to that of the game's". Activision denies that the scenes were meant to give an impression of gameplay, stating in a press release shortly after the ASA banning that "The footage was intended purely to communicate the subject matter of the game rather than to represent actual gameplay".

== Other versions ==
A collector's edition of the game was released for Windows on October 25, 2005 and for the Xbox 360 labeled as the "Special Edition". It features the game and a bonus disc, which includes interviews, a making of the movie and two mission walkthroughs. On May 17, 2006, Activision announced a Game of the Year Edition for the Xbox 360, which includes material from the Special Edition, plus a token to download the Skirmish Map Pack. In January 2006, MFORMA (now Hands-On Mobile) released Call of Duty 2 for mobile phones. The mobile version is a 2D top-down shooter. It received a favorable review from IGN, praising its length and storytelling.
