= Off-Road Redneck Racing =

2001 video game

- Developer: Rage Software
- Publishers: EU: Rage Software; NA: Interplay Entertainment
- Platform: Microsoft Windows
- Release: EU: March 16, 2001; NA: May 1, 2001
- Genre: Racing video game
- Modes: Single-player, multiplayer

Offroad, known in North America as Off-Road Redneck Racing, is a video game developed by Rage Software for Windows in 2001. It is a spinoff of the Redneck Rampage series in North America.

== Gameplay ==
The game features a variety of off-road vehicles, ranging from buggies to pickup trucks. The tracks are set in off-road environments, such as a swamp or farm land. The main single player aspect consists of a championship mode, in which the player can gain upgrades and join teams as they progress. Other single player modes are the challenge races against computer opponents, or time trials to beat a set record. Various in-game options can be adjusted, such as the season and weather. Network play was also supported against other human players.

As shown on the box art and title, the game is technically a spin-off of the Redneck Rampage series of video games. The original Redneck Rampage games were a first-person shooter based on the Build engine, also for the PC. The game featured two rednecks (shown on the box art for Off-Road Redneck Racing) using a variety of weapons to battle aliens and brainwashed townsfolk in backwoods locations. The original 1997 game had strong sales, and also spawned another spinoff, titled Redneck Deer Huntin'; however, Off-Road Redneck Racing is the only game in the series not to use the aforementioned Build engine.

The relations to Redneck Rampage are low. Besides the title and box art, a few textures from the original games (such as the in-game font) are used. In addition, sound clips from the main character of Redneck Rampage are used as a voice-over during races; however, these were recorded for the original game, and got recycled for the game.

== Reception ==
Reception

Aggregate score
Aggregator	Score
Metacritic	65/100

Review scores
Publication	Score
Computer Games Magazine	3/5
Computer Gaming World	3.5/5
EP Daily	6/10
GameRevolution	C+
GameSpot	7.2/10
Génération 4	13/20
IGN	7.2/10
Next Generation	3/5
PC Gamer (US)	78%
PC Zone	64%

The game received "mixed" reviews according to the review aggregation website Metacritic. Emmett Schkloven of NextGen wrote (in a southern accent) that the game was "Not bad fer gettin' back to yer white-trash roots, but it certainly doesn't have the staying power of a great racer." Tom Price of Computer Gaming World said that the game was "far from being the best unpaved racer out there, but it's a lot better than the name would suggest. Everything about it is polished, from the graphics and interface to the bluegrass soundtrack. Most importantly, the driving action is fast and furious, and offers more challenges than just following the quickest line around a track. The only thing missing is the cultured, sophisticated humor of that other infamous redneck game—and that's hardly missed at all."
