= Ladbech =

Ladbech is a railway town and archaeological site in southern Tunisia. It is part of Toujane, one of the Matmata mountain villages located in the Medjerda valley, outside of Bou Salem.
