= Cyberia (video game) =

1994 video game

- Developer: Xatrix Entertainment
- Publisher: Interplay Productions
- Composers: Thomas Dolby; Mike Kapitan
- Series: Cyberia
- Platforms: MS-DOS, 3DO, FM Towns, Sega Saturn, PlayStation
- Release: December 2, 1994: MS-DOS; NA: December 2, 1994; EU: 1994 3DO; EU: 1994; NA: January 1996; JP: January 26, 1996 FM Towns; JP: 1995 Saturn; NA: 1996; JP: February 16, 1996; EU: April 19, 1996; BR: August 1996 PlayStation; NA: February 1, 1996; JP: February 16, 1996; EU: April 19, 1996
- Genre: Action-adventure
- Mode: Single-player

Cyberia is a science fiction action adventure video game released for MS-DOS on December 2, 1994, and released two years later on the PlayStation, Sega Saturn, 3DO and FM Towns consoles. A sequel, Cyberia 2: Resurrection, was released in 1995 for both DOS and Windows 9x formats.

== Gameplay ==
Zak using the mercenary rig's gun turrets to shoot down Cartel ships

Cyberia uses prerendered visuals during gameplay, and boasted impressive graphics for its time. While mostly linear, there are two points in the game where the player makes a decision that can change important outcomes. There are four basic methods of gameplay which Cyberia employs: exploring the environment through walking (from node to node), attempting to complete puzzles in a full screen view, using a gun turret to shoot down planes, and flying in various vehicles. Direction and speed during flight are computer controlled while the player controls the weaponry. Vehicles include the TF-22 Transfighter stealth jet, a nanotech virus cleaner, "Charlie" the remotely operated decontamination robot, and the Cyberia weapon itself.

Weapons and methods of attack are few in the exploring sections of gameplay. Attached to Zak's suit is a heat pulse weapon that can be fired from his arm. The only other modes of attack during the walking portions of the game consist of traps that must be set to outsmart an enemy, which goes hand-in-hand with the occasional demand for stealth. For the gun turret portion, two heat-charged energy blasts are released from each side of the turret when Zak fires it. When flying the stealth aircraft, Zak is able to dispense continuous bolts of blue energy at the cost of the aircraft's power supply; controlling the virus cleaner is the same concept. The "Charlie" robot adds a new form of attack: a weapon which kills all enemies on the screen at the cost of a moderate amount of the machine's energy. A similar electrical energy weapon seen on the virus cleaner is also used when Zak is joined with the Cyberia weapon.

The various puzzles in the game can range from requiring the player to figure out the password on a computer to disarming a bomb on a stealth aircraft. Zak can use his suit's BLADES (Bi-optic Low Amplitude Displayed Energy System) to scan the current puzzle in several ways for help in completing it. The three modes of Zak's BLADES are as follows:

- InfraRed/Thermal Scan - Detects heat traces and marks left in the InfraRed spectrum. This scan is very sensitive, and thus very accurate.
- Magnetic Resonance Imaging - Allows Zak to "look through" a puzzle object to determine an item's function and the way it operates.
- BioScan - Scans the area for organic matter in a limited range.

Puzzle difficulty and arcade difficulty are set in the beginning of the game, but setting both to "easy" is not permitted; if the player attempts to do so, the game will state that it will be "too easy." Arcade difficulty controls the toughness of the combat in the game (both on the ground and in the air).

The Saturn version of the game supports the mouse and mission stick in addition to the standard controller. The 3DO version supports only the standard controller and flight stick. The PlayStation version is one of the few games compatible with the PlayStation Mouse.

== Plot ==
Cyberia is set in the near future of the year 2027, five years after a global economic collapse. The world is under the dominion of two opposing superpowers, the First World Alliance in the west and the Cartel in the east. William Devlin, the leader of the FWA, receives word that a devastating weapon is being produced in a secret base in Siberia, referred to as the Cyberia Complex. Curious to unravel the mysteries of this weapon, Devlin pardons a cyber-hacker named Zebulon Pike "Zak" Kingston and charges him with the task of infiltrating the Complex and retrieving intel on the weapon being produced there.

Already becoming aware of Cyberia's secret operations, the Cartel seizes control of the Complex with the same goal as the FWA which is to discover the nature of the super weapon being produced by a third party. Zak is scheduled to rendezvous with an oil rig run by an FWA-contracted mercenary group managed by Luis Arturo Santos and his assistant Gia Scarlatti to pick up a TF-22 TransFighter, a sophisticated aircraft that will ensure Zak's arrival at the Cyberia Complex. Shortly after arriving, the oil rig is attacked by the Cartel. After Zak and Gia defend the rig using gun turrets, the mercenaries, sensing betrayal, move to kill Zak by hunting him down and sabotaging the TF-22. Zak eventually steals the TF-22 and travels through several hostile locales en route to the Cyberia Complex; a mountain range infested with Cartel hoverfighters, a Cartel-run oceanlab, and a commuter tunnel are among the places visited by Zak. Eventually, the TF-22 reaches the Cyberia Complex and Zak proceeds to wreak havoc on the Cartel's analysis efforts.

While exploring the Complex, Zak encounters more than Cartel soldiers, as he is forced to eradicate the Complex scientists experimental virus which killed some of the soldiers. After purging the virus from the Complex, Zak uncovers the Cyberion, an amorphous collection of miniature robots, or nanites, that has achieved sentience. Devlin then contacts Zak and informs him the cyber-hacker himself is a weapon, which Cyberion explains to mean that a high-yield explosive device has been implanted into Zak's brain. Upon reaching the Cyberion, Devlin had intended to detonate the device from orbit, eliminating the weapon and killing Zak simultaneously. Zak, frustrated over Devlin's betrayal and upon Cyberion's suggestion, merges with the Cyberion which defuses the explosive device in Zak's head. Together, Zak and the Cyberion launch into space to confront Devlin in the FWA space station. The station's defenses are slowly crippled until the Cyberion and Zak make the final move and kill the treacherous Devlin by destroying the station. The resulting shockwave causes the Cyberion/Zak amalgamation to lose consciousness while it plummets to Earth. Upon crashing, an FWA retrieval team led by a Doctor John Corbin is heard hoisting up the remains of Cyberion/Zak into a helicopter.

== Reception ==
Reception

Review scores
Publication	Score
IGN	6/10 (PS1)
Next Generation	3/5 (PC, PS1, 3DO)
Maximum	3/5 (SAT)
Sega Saturn Magazine	82% (SAT)

Reviews for Cyberia were generally mixed. For the most part, the game's cinematic, prerendered visuals were lauded; according to Philip Jong of Adventure Classic Gaming, Cyberia was "one of the first game titles to combine computer animations and Hollywood film technique to form visually stunning graphics and cut scenes." Similarly, IGN stated that the "use of multiple camera angles, eerie soundtrack, detailed light-sourcing, and short, effective cut-sequences really pulls the player into the game." Radion Automatic of Sega Saturn Magazine likewise commented that "the graphics remain stylistically constant pretty much throughout (apart from the ropey anti-aircraft concept), displaying solid-looking rendered characters and backgrounds in a cinematic enough fashion to carry the atmosphere." Scary Larry and Tommy Glide of GamePro both noted the excellent polygon rendering on the characters and the detailed backgrounds. A reviewer for Next Generation praised the rendered graphics, soundtrack, and "absorbing" storyline, and said even with the very limited interactivity, "Cyberia keeps itself above the competition by mixing sequences with puzzles and plot devices that keep the gamer drawn into the story". Maximum complimented the "slick metallic looking graphics", though like Radion Automatic, they found the graphics of the anti-aircraft sections unimpressive.

Despite the praise over the game's aesthetics, reviewers found shortcomings in Cyberia's linear gameplay. In his review, Jong goes on to criticize the game's "weak puzzles ... [that are] not well integrated into the story or gameplay." He concludes by saying Cyberia is "a classic example of beauty, but no substance." In IGN's words, "gameplay does tend to suffer in graphic adventures, which usually consists of doing things over and over until you do it right." Radion Automatic felt the gameplay was enjoyable, but acknowledged that "it's hard to think who to recommend it to. The roleplay element isn't quite deep enough to appeal to solid adventure fans and the action is a bit too simple for super-speed cyber-shoot-'em-up heads." Maximum echoed these remarks: "RPG purists will find this too shallow and action fans will find it too dull." They elaborated that the game tends to switch between gameplay styles abruptly, with no rhyme or reason, making it difficult to get involved with the game. Scary Larry complained of twitchy controls, and said that the game focuses too much on puzzle elements and not enough on action. Tommy Glide found the controls to be initially confusing and annoying, and said the game lacks replay value. One reviewer for Next Generation found the main problem to be that Cyberia does not allow the player to explore and "[create] your own story", while another simply stated "it never achieves the level of interactivity that's required to make it a truly great game."

Reviews for the game showed little variation across the four different versions (PC, PlayStation, Saturn, and 3DO), and a Next Generation critic stated that the four versions are "exactly" alike.

== Cyberia 2: Resurrection ==
Cyberia 2: Resurrection was released on March 26, 1996 for MS-DOS and Microsoft Windows as a sequel. It features the same gameplay as the original with improved 3D-rendered graphics and an increase in the amount of in-game cinematics.

The story picks up where the first game ended. After Zak and the Cyberia weapon crash land back on Earth following the destruction of Devlin's orbital headquarters, they are intercepted by an FWA team led by a Dr. Corbin. Corbin, under orders from his FWA employers, places Zak in cryo-storage and uses the remains of the Cyberia weapon to create a deadly virus called nano-toxin. Though the FWA seeks to quell a growing rebel movement with the nano-toxin, the maniacal Corbin intends to use it to kill millions and "reshape the world as we know it." After three years in cryo-storage, Zak is thawed out by a renegade FWA major, and together the two of them set out to find Corbin and stop his plans.

Cyberia 2 received a score of 82/100 from Computer Game Review.

Unlike its predecessor, it featured a rock soundtrack.
