= Call of Duty: Finest Hour =

2004 video game

- Developer: Spark Unlimited (Note: Additional development for PlayStation 2 and Xbox versions by Kuju Entertainment. Ported to GameCube by Exakt Entertainment.)
- Publisher: Activision
- Designer: Eric Church
- Writer: Michael Schiffer
- Composer: Michael Giacchino
- Series: Call of Duty
- Engine: RenderWare
- Platforms: GameCube, PlayStation 2, Xbox
- Release: NA: November 16, 2004; AU: November 25, 2004; EU: December 3, 2004
- Genre: First-person shooter
- Modes: Single-player, multiplayer

Call of Duty: Finest Hour is a 2004 first-person shooter video game developed by Spark Unlimited and published by Activision for GameCube, PlayStation 2, and Xbox. It is the first console installment of the Call of Duty series.

Although it is based on the original Call of Duty for Microsoft Windows, it has a different storyline and acts as a side-story of the main game. It features six intertwined stories and battles based on real events from the perspective of soldiers on each side of the allied campaign (U.S., British, and Soviet) during the Second World War.

The game's music was composed by Michael Giacchino, who previously worked on the original Call of Duty and the Medal of Honor franchise. AC/DC singer Brian Johnson provides the voice of Sergeant Starkey, one of the British commandos.

== Gameplay ==
Much like the rest of the Call of Duty franchise, Finest Hour is a first-person shooter where the player takes the role of a soldier during the Second World War. In the game's three campaigns, they will play as various characters from Russia, England, and the United States, respectively. The player uses authentic weaponry from the time period.

Throughout the game, players will perform additional roles then just as infantry. These include the usage of mounted machine gun turrets, both on structures and vehicles, and the usage of heavy weaponry such as tanks.

Players have a limited health pool that is depleted upon being shot, attacked at melee range, or from fall damage; health can be restored by picking up and consuming health packs, the number of which can be held is limited by your choice of difficulty level in the campaign.

=== Multiplayer ===
Finest Hour can support both online and local multi-player support, depending on the console. It had no online multiplayer support for the GameCube as it does not take advantage of the GameCube broadband or modem adapter. On the Xbox, Finest Hour had Xbox Live support and up to 32 players can play locally through Xbox's System Link feature. The PlayStation 2 port of Finest Hour also had PS2 Online support, with up to 16 players per session. While Xbox Live for the original Xbox was shut down in 2010, Call of Duty: Finest Hour is now playable online using replacement online servers for the original Xbox called Insignia.

== Plot ==
Rather than following a singular campaign, Finest Hour features three smaller campaigns that cover different fronts of the Second World War. The first, taking place in the Eastern front, covers much of the battle of Stalingrad and the following Russian counterattack. The North African campaign follows British soldiers sabotaging and sapping German forces in Tunisia, whilst the Western Front campaign follows American soldiers fighting through Western Europe in an attempt to reach further into Germany.

=== Eastern front ===
In the Soviet campaign, the player first controls Private Aleksandr Sokolov. Sokolov participates in the Battle of Stalingrad following Sergeant Oleg Puskov. The sergeant is eventually killed by a sniper, sacrificing himself to save Sokolov. A female Soviet sniper, named Tanya Pavelovna appears and shoots the German sniper, then sends Sokolov on a mission to liberate Mamayev Kurgan hill. After the mission is completed, Sokolov becomes Pavelovna's spotter as the two work to harass the Germans. Pavelovna and Sokolov navigate through the sewers to help defend a tractor factory to ensure the safety of a T-34, supervised by Major Nikolai Badanov. In the tank, the major fights his way to General Belov's headquarters. Nikolai has orders from Belov to deliver a radio to a spotter team at the train station in order to coordinate a Katyusha rocket barrage on German armor. Afterward, Badanov is involved in the Soviet assault on a German airfield at Tatsinskaya, codenamed Operation Little Saturn. Nikolai and other T-34s proceed to the airstrip to destroy German aircraft. Upon destroying the airfield they meet up with more Soviets to assault the German headquarter's air traffic control.

=== North Africa ===
The British campaign follows Edward Carlyle. Carlyle embarks on a night raid in Matmata with a commando team led by Sergant Starkey to storm a German fortress and destroy a fuel depot. After the Matmata raid, Starkey and Carlyle evacuate in a Jeep. By daybreak Starkey drives through German infested roads, while Carlyle mans the 50. Cal Browning machine gun. Eventually Carlyle and Starkey make it to a besieged British fort, where they rescue Sergeant Dehart and a cartographer and ultimately neutralize the German presence in the fort.

=== Western Front ===
The American campaign follows Sergeant Chuck Walker. The first three missions concentrate on the capture of Aachen, with Chuck protecting the tank column along the way. After the capture of Aachen, the story shifts focus to M4 Sherman tank commander Sam Rivers, a young African-American who fends off Germans around the town of Tillet. After that, the newly promoted Lieutenant Walker infiltrates the city of Remagen to scout the Ludendorff Bridge and escort Rivers' tank squad to the bridge. Upon reaching the bridge, a huge hole in the ground prevents the tanks from moving on. Chuck eliminates the German garrison before they can scuttle it to prevent the Allied advance, delivering the bridge into Allied hands, so they can push into Germany.

== Multiplayer ==
The Xbox and PS2 versions of the game offer online multiplayer for up to 16 players. There are eight maps and four game modes. Standard deathmatch, team deathmatch, and capture the flag modes are included, as well as "search and destroy," which is a team-based mode in which one team attempts to set a time bomb on a target, while the other team tries to thwart the bombing. In line with other online-enabled games on the Xbox, multiplayer for Call of Duty: Finest Hour, Xbox Live was available to players until 15 April 2010. The game is now playable online again on the replacement Xbox Live servers called Insignia.

== Reception ==
Reception

Aggregate score
Aggregator	Score		
Aggregator	GameCube	PS2	Xbox
Metacritic	74/100	76/100	73/100

Review scores
Publication	Score		
Publication	GameCube	PS2	Xbox
Electronic Gaming Monthly	8/10	8/10	8/10
Eurogamer	N/A	N/A	7/10
Famitsu	N/A	32/40	33/40
Game Informer	8.5/10	8.5/10	8.5/10
GamePro	3/5	3/5	3/5
GameSpot	6.6/10	6.7/10	6.7/10
GameSpy	4/5	4/5	4/5
GameZone	7.5/10	8.7/10	7.5/10
IGN	7/10	7.3/10	7.3/10
Nintendo Power	3.7/5	N/A	N/A
Nintendo World Report	6/10	N/A	N/A
Official U.S. PlayStation Magazine	N/A	4/5	N/A
Official Xbox Magazine (US)	N/A	N/A	7/10
The Sydney Morning Herald	N/A	N/A	3/5
The Times	N/A	5/5	5/5

Call of Duty: Finest Hour received generally mixed-to-positive reviews. According to the review aggregation website Metacritic, the PlayStation 2 version received "generally favorable reviews", with an average score of 76 out of 100, while the GameCube and Xbox versions received "mixed or average" reviews, earning an average score of 74 out of 100, and 73 out of 100, respectively. according to Metacritic.

IGN stated that despite its portrayal of a good shooter, it is still stuck between realism and over-the-top antics; the graphics were criticized as being very ordinary along with the effects being disappointing and the sound was also found to be out of place in some areas of the game. GameSpot's Bob Colayco was equally mixed in his review, giving it a 6.7 out of 10 and describing the game as "a competent shooter on most counts", positively noting its variety of locales in its three campaigns, but he criticized the feeling of weaponry, stating "that it's often difficult to tell how much damage you're doing to an enemy, and when your target is actually dead."

The Times gave the PS2 and Xbox versions all five stars, saying, "What singles out this series from the rest is that it homes in on the sheer intensity and ugliness of war." However, The Sydney Morning Herald gave the latter console version three stars out of five, saying, "Although missions are well-designed and combat can be intense, sequences such as the battle to reclaim Stalingrad lack the scale and cinematic grandeur of the PC version." Detroit Free Press gave it two stars out of four, saying that the game, "while offering a well-scripted narrative, comes up with precious few reasons to play out these battles again. No surprises here -- just solid, albeit predictable, action that could have been better."

In Japan, where the PS2 and Xbox versions were ported and published by Capcom, Famitsu gave it a score of 33 out of 40 for the latter, and 32 out of 40 for the former. Nintendo Power's five reviewers gave the GameCube version of the game an average score of 3.7 stars out of 5.

By July 2006, the PlayStation 2 version had sold 1.2 million units and earned $45 million in the U.S. NextGen ranked it as the 41st highest-selling game launched for the PlayStation 2, Xbox or GameCube between January 2000 and July 2006 in that country. Combined sales of Call of Duty console games reached 4 million units. The PS2 version also received a "Platinum" sales award from the Entertainment and Leisure Software Publishers Association (ELSPA), indicating sales of at least 300,000 units in the UK.
