= Call of Duty: United Offensive =

2004 video game expansion pack

- Developer: Gray Matter Studios
- Publishers: Activision; Aspyr (Mac)
- Producer: Ken Turner
- Designer: Dan Koppel
- Programmers: Jed Adams, Alexander Conserva, Ryan Feltrin
- Artist: Corky Lehmkuhl
- Writers: Michael Schiffer, Richard Farrelly
- Composer: Michael Giacchino
- Series: Call of Duty
- Engine: id Tech 3
- Platforms: Windows, Mac OS X
- Release: Microsoft Windows: NA/AU: September 14, 2004; EU: September 24, 2004; Mac OS X: NA: November 30, 2004
- Genre: First-person shooter
- Modes: Single-player, multiplayer

Call of Duty: United Offensive is an expansion pack for the first-person shooter video game Call of Duty. It was developed by Gray Matter Studios, with contributions from Pi Studios, and published by Activision. It was released for Microsoft Windows on September 14, 2004, and for Mac OS X on November 22, 2004.

== Gameplay ==
United Offensive level depicting the Battle of the Bulge

The biggest changes made by United Offensive are in the multiplayer aspect of the game. There are new maps which are much larger than the ones in the original game, new weapons from the single player campaign, an in-game rank system which grants additional bonuses with more points, and vehicles such as tanks and jeeps.

=== Characters ===
Cpl. Scott Riley is the first playable protagonist of United Offensive in the American campaign. Riley participates throughout the entire Bastogne campaign by defending Bois Jacques, capturing and securing the crossroads and town of Foy, and capturing Noville. The "Bois Jacques" and "Foy" missions of Riley's campaign are reminiscent of HBO's Band of Brothers episodes Bastogne and The Breaking Point, respectively.

Sgt. James Doyle is the second playable protagonist in United Offensive, serving as the playable character in the British campaign. Doyle is a Royal Air Force B-17 Flying Fortress gunner who is shot down over the Netherlands on the RAF's first daylight mission using the Fortresses. The Dutch resistance, with the help of Major Ingram, an S.A.S. operative, rescue him before he is captured by the Germans. Doyle (now an S.A.S. operative) and Ingram are then sent to Sicily with other S.A.S. operatives to knock out several huge cliff mounted cannons, not unlike those in the 1961 film, The Guns of Navarone. Doyle returns in Call of Duty 3 as the player character of the British/French sections of the campaign.

Pvt. Yuri Petrenko is the playable Soviet protagonist in United Offensive. Petrenko participates by helping defend the Soviet trenches during the Battle of Kursk, securing Ponyri's streets, destroying German panzer tanks in Prok, and assaulting and defending Kharkov until the arrival of Soviet reinforcements.

=== Multiplayer ===
United Offensive introduces a ranking system to multiplayer. As players' scores increase, they gain ranks. Each rank spawns with new perks/benefits. Multiplayer mode features objectives such as planting or defusing explosives, destroying or protecting objectives, capturing or protecting flags, and assisting friendly flag carriers. The ranks are reset each map and are not persistent.

United Offensive adds three new multiplayer modes to the game: Domination, Capture the Flag, and Base Assault.

Domination

The objective of Domination is to control all of the control points on the map. There are three of these control points scattered around the map, and are usually found in key strategic locations. To capture a control point, a player must stand near it with no enemies nearby. After a certain amount of time, the area is captured by your team. Every time a team captures a control point, they add a point to their overall score. To win, a team must either have the higher score when time runs out, or capture all of the control points on the map.

Base Assault

Base Assault requires teams to use heavy weaponry such as tanks and artillery strikes to attack their opponent's bases and destroy them. On each map, both teams have three bases they must defend and attack. Once a bunker takes enough damage, it is not destroyed, but exposed to infantry attack. To completely destroy a bunker, a player must sneak into the basement of an exposed bunker and plant an explosive. Then they must keep the other team from defusing the explosive so it will explode and destroy the bunker. A team wins either by destroying the most bunkers before time expires, or completely destroying all of the opposing team's bunkers. In some modifications of Base Assault games, teams must use only anti tank weaponry and satchel charges instead of tanks to destroy the bases.

Capture the Flag

The most traditional game mode is Capture the Flag. Each side has a flag that they must protect. The objective is to steal the enemy's flag and take it back to their own base to score a point. A team can only score if they have their flag intact. For example, if both teams take the opposing flags at the same time, neither team can score until one team retrieves their flag. A team wins either by capturing the flag a certain number of times or capturing the most flags at the end of the game. A limited selection of maps are available for CTF play.

== Reception ==
Reception

Aggregate scores
Aggregator	Score
GameRankings	87%
Metacritic	87/100

Computer Games Magazine presented United Offensive with its 2004 "Expansion of the Year" award. The editors wrote, "Anyone that enjoys the original Call of Duty will be hard-pressed to find fault with this—if you want one expansion to serve as a role model for all others, this is the one." It was nominated for GameSpot's 2004 "Best Expansion Pack" award, which went to Rise of Nations: Thrones and Patriots.
