= Crimson Tide (film) =

1995 American film by Tony Scott

- Theatrical release poster
- Directed by: Tony Scott
- Screenplay by: Michael Schiffer
- Story by: Michael Schiffer; Richard P. Henrick
- Produced by: Don Simpson; Jerry Bruckheimer
- Starring: Denzel Washington; Gene Hackman; George Dzundza; Viggo Mortensen; James Gandolfini; Matt Craven; Rocky Carroll
- Cinematography: Dariusz Wolski
- Edited by: Chris Lebenzon
- Music by: Hans Zimmer
- Production companies: Hollywood Pictures; Don Simpson/Jerry Bruckheimer Films
- Distributed by: Buena Vista Pictures Distribution
- Release date: May 12, 1995
- Running time: 116 minutes
- Country: United States
- Language: English
- Budget: $53 million
- Box office: $157.4 million

Crimson Tide is a 1995 American submarine action thriller film directed by Tony Scott and produced by Don Simpson and Jerry Bruckheimer. It takes place during a fictional period of political turmoil in Russia, in which ultranationalists threaten to launch nuclear missiles at the United States and Japan.

The film focuses on a clash of wills between the seasoned commanding officer of a U.S. nuclear missile submarine (Gene Hackman) and his new executive officer (or XO, played by Denzel Washington), arising from conflicting interpretations of an order to launch their missiles. The story parallels a real incident during the Cuban Missile Crisis.

Crimson Tide was released by Buena Vista Pictures Distribution on May 12, 1995. The film received mostly positive reviews from critics and grossed $157.4 million against a $53 million budget. Hans Zimmer, who scored the film, won a Grammy Award for the main theme, which heavily uses synthesizers instead of traditional orchestral instruments. An extended cut, which incorporates seven minutes of deleted scenes, was released on DVD in 2006, while the 2008 Blu-ray release only includes the theatrical version. In a 2025 interview, Bruckheimer mentioned that he was developing a sequel and was hopeful that Washington would reprise his role.

== Plot ==
In post-Soviet Russia, civil war erupts as a result of the ongoing conflict in Chechnya. Military units loyal to Vladimir Radchenko, a Russian ultra-nationalist rebel, take control of a nuclear missile installation in the Russian Far East near the Chinese and North Korean borders and threaten nuclear war if confronted.

USS Alabama, a U.S. Navy submarine, is dispatched on patrol with orders to launch a pre-emptive nuclear strike if Radchenko fuels his missiles. Combat-hardened veteran Captain Frank Ramsey chooses Lieutenant Commander Ron Hunter, who has an extensive education in military history and tactics but no combat experience, as his new XO.

Tensions arise between the headstrong Ramsey and the more analytical and cautious Hunter, exacerbated by Ramsey's decision to order a missile drill amidst the chaos caused by a galley fire that results in the death of the chief mess officer. Hunter helps fight the fire and discreetly questions the decision but is chastised by Ramsey for the appearance of discord.

Alabama receives an Emergency Action Message ordering a missile launch against the Russian base. As Alabama prepares to fire, a second radio message is detected before a rebel Russian Akula-class submarine attacks, damaging the boat’s radio and leaving the message incomplete.

With the last confirmed order being to launch, Ramsey decides to proceed. Hunter disagrees, believing the partial second message may be a retraction. When Hunter refuses to consent as is required for a launch to be authorized, Ramsey tries to relieve him of duty. Hunter orders Ramsey arrested for attempting to circumvent two-man protocol. The Chief of the Boat sides with Hunter and has Ramsey relieved of command and confined to his stateroom, putting Hunter in charge.

The Russian submarine attacks Alabama again. Alabama emerges victorious but is damaged when a torpedo detonates next to her hull. The main propulsion system is disabled, and the bilge bay begins flooding. As the crew tries to restore propulsion, Hunter orders the sealing of the bilge with sailors trapped inside, saving Alabama at the expense of the men. Propulsion is restored before Alabama reaches hull-crush depth.

Officers and crew loyal to Ramsey unite and stage a mutiny. They retake the control room, confining Hunter, the Chief of the Boat, and some others to the officers' mess. Repairs to the radio continue, but Ramsey is determined to proceed without waiting for verification. Hunter escapes his arrest and prepares to retake the ship. He gains the support of weapons officer Peter Ince in the missile control room, further delaying the launch and leading Ramsey to go there. Hunter's party storms Alabama's command center, removing the captain's missile key. Ramsey and his men return, resulting in an armed Mexican standoff. With news that the radio will soon be repaired, Ramsey and Hunter agree to wait until the deadline for a preemptive missile launch to be effective.

Communications are eventually restored, revealing the full message from the second transmission – a retraction ordering that the missile launch be aborted because Radchenko's rebellion has been quelled. Ramsey turns the conn over to Hunter and returns to his cabin.

The two men are put before a tribunal at Naval Station Pearl Harbor to answer for their actions. The tribunal concludes that both men were right and both men were wrong, and Hunter's actions were deemed lawfully justified and in the best interests of the United States. Unofficially, the tribunal reprimands both men for failing to resolve their differences. Thanks to Ramsey's personal recommendation, the tribunal agrees to grant Hunter command of his own sub while allowing Ramsey to save face via an early retirement with full honors. Outside, Hunter meets with Ramsey to express his gratitude, and the two men part ways amicably.

A textual epilogue states that as of January 1996, only the President has the authority to launch nuclear missiles.

== Cast ==
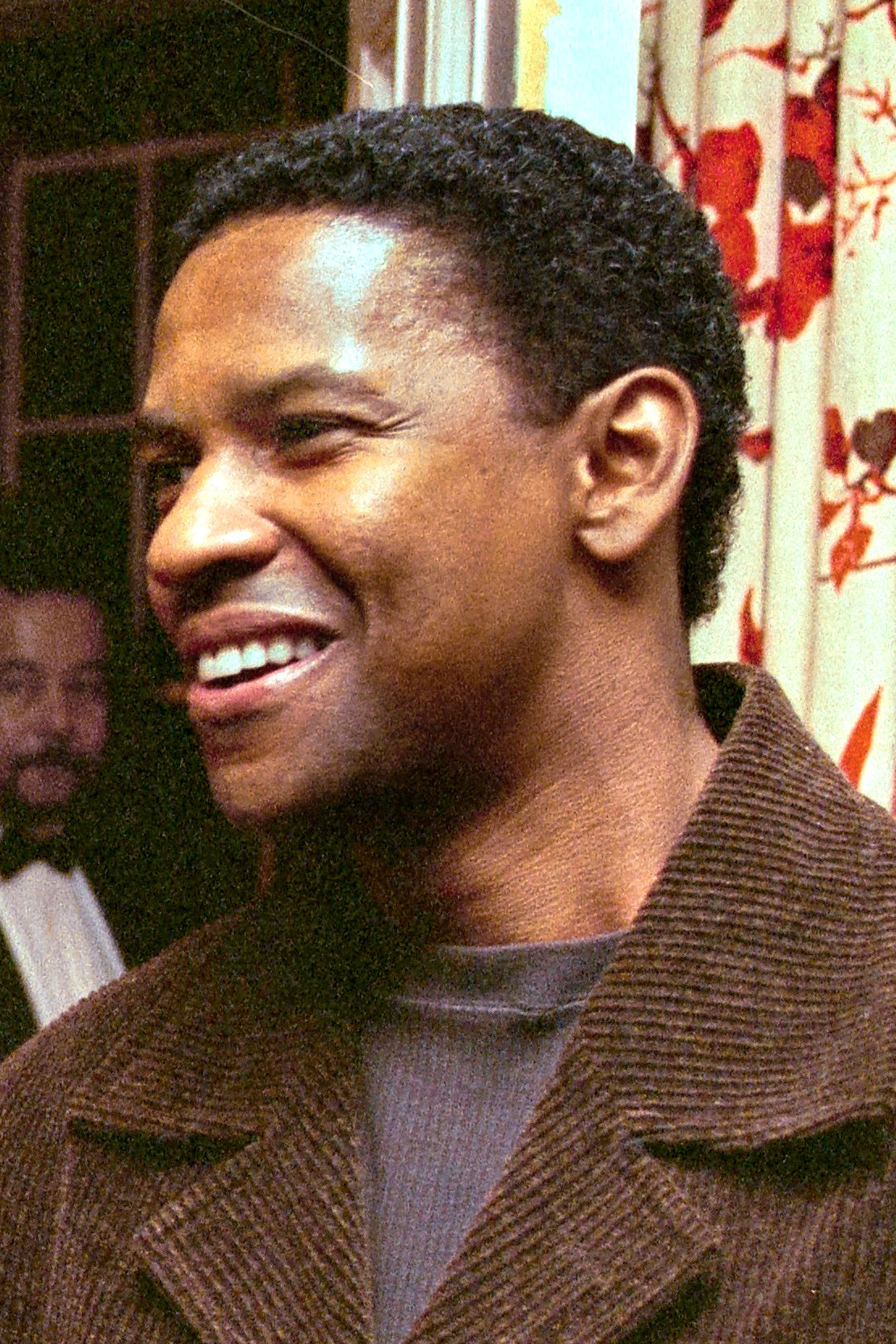
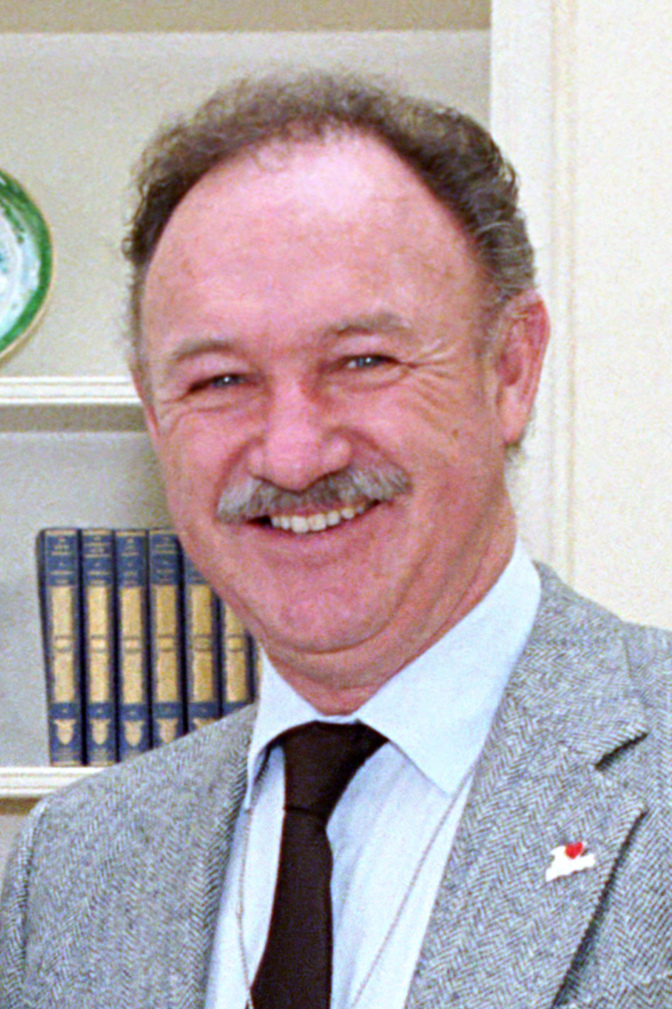
The film stars Denzel Washington (left) and Gene Hackman.
- Denzel Washington as Lieutenant Commander Ronald "Ron" Hunter, Executive Officer (XO)
- Gene Hackman as Captain Franklin "Frank" Ramsey, Commanding Officer (CO)
- Matt Craven as Lieutenant Roy Zimmer, Communications Officer (COMMO)
- George Dzundza as Chief of the Boat Walters (COB)
- Viggo Mortensen as Lieutenant Peter Ince, Weapons Officer (WEPS)
- James Gandolfini as Lieutenant Robert "Bobby" Dougherty, Supply Officer (SUPPO)
- Lillo Brancato as Petty Officer Third Class Russell Vossler, Radio Operator
- Rocky Carroll as Lieutenant Darik Westergard, Operations Officer (OPS)
- Danny Nucci as Petty Officer Danny Rivetti, Sonar Supervisor
- Steve Zahn as Seaman William Barnes
- Rick Schroder as Lieutenant Paul Hellerman, Damage Control Officer (DCO)
- Vanessa Bell Calloway as Julia Hunter, Ron's wife
- Jaime P. Gomez as Officer of the Deck Mahoney (OOD)
- Michael Milhoan as Chief of the Watch Hunsicker (COW)
- Scott Burkholder as Tactical Supervising Officer Billy Linkletter (TSO)
- Marcello Thedford as Lawson
- Scott Grimes as Petty Officer Hillaire
- Mark Christopher Lawrence as Leading Culinary Specialist Rono
- Earl Billings as Culinary Specialist Rick Marichek
- Ryan Phillippe as Seaman Grattam
- Eric Bruskotter as Bennefield
- Jacob Vargas as Petty Officer Dehner, Sonarman
- Jason Robards as Rear Admiral Anderson (uncredited)
- Tommy Bush as Admiral Williams
- Daniel von Bargen as Vladimir Radchenko, Russian ultra-nationalist leader
- Richard Valeriani as himself

== Historical parallels ==
Crimson Tide parallels events that occurred during the Cuban Missile Crisis onboard Soviet submarine B-59, with Denzel Washington's character reflecting Soviet second-in-command Vasily Arkhipov. An article in the United States Army War College's magazine compares Hackman's Captain Ramsey character to real world examples of senior US military officers of the 21st century being relieved of command, analyzing him as a learning tool regarding toxic military leadership, noting that:

[Captain Ramsey] actively dismissed information that weakened his illusory correlation between the events in eastern Russia and the need for the submarine to launch nuclear weapons. … The limitations on Captain Ramsey’s leadership demonstrate that he was not a critical thinker. Captain Ramsey did not apply mental agility, creativity, or adaptability in analyzing the enemy or situation around him, thus guiding the world to the brink of nuclear war.

== Production ==
=== Development and writing ===
In 1993, the United States Navy allowed studio executives researching the movie to embark aboard Trident submarine USS Florida from Bangor, Washington, with the Gold Crew. Those embarked included Hollywood Pictures president of production Ricardo Mestres, director Tony Scott, producers Don Simpson and Jerry Bruckheimer, screenwriter Michael Schiffer, and writer Richard Henrick. While aboard, the Navy allowed the film crew to videotape Florida's Executive Officer, Lieutenant Commander William Toti, performing many of the same actions (Executive Officer's response to fire, flooding, missile launch sequence, etc.) that actor Denzel Washington eventually performed as executive officer in the movie.

The Navy had been led to believe that the movie's storyline was about a Trident ballistic missile submarine crew attempting to stop the ship's fictional computer from launching nuclear missiles and starting World War III. In movie parlance, the Navy was told the story would be "The Hunt for Red October meets 2001: A Space Odyssey." The Navy wanted the Florida crew to prove to the studio executives that "there is no computer on a Trident submarine that can launch missiles; hence the storyline is implausible.

Following the at-sea walk-through and missile launch demonstration, Florida returned to port to drop off the studio executives. During that transit, Toti spent much time in the ship's wardroom with the studio executives, walking them through the missile launch redundancy procedures. A few months later, the studio returned to the Navy with the revised storyline, and the Executive Officer, Lieutenant Commander Hunter (the character played by Denzel Washington), was now leading a mutiny against the commanding officer to prevent a missile launch.

The film has uncredited additional writing by Quentin Tarantino, much of it being the pop-culture-reference-laden dialogue, after he scripted Scott's previous film True Romance (1993). Tarantino had an on-set feud with Denzel Washington during filming over what was called "Tarantino's racist dialogue added to the script". A few years later, Washington apologized to Tarantino, saying he "buried that hatchet".

=== Filming ===
Filming took place in 1994. In the end, the Navy objected to many of the elements in the script—particularly mutiny on board a U.S. naval vessel—and as such, the film was produced without the Navy's assistance. The French Navy assisted the team for production with the use of the aircraft carrier Foch. The dockside scene in which Captain Ramsey addresses the crew with Alabama in the background and the crew then runs on board actually features USS Barbel. The sail ("conning tower") was a plywood mock-up since Barbel's sail had been removed. Barbel had been sold by the U.S. Navy and was in the process of being scrapped. The bridge set piece from USS Alabama was eventually reused in Independence Day as USS Georgia's bridge.

Because the Navy refused to cooperate with the filming, citing the script as unrealistic and feeling the film portrayed its submariners in a bad light, the production company could not secure footage of a submarine submerging. After checking to ensure there was no law against filming naval vessels, the producers waited at the submarine base at Pearl Harbor until a submarine was put to sea. After a submarine (coincidentally, the real USS Alabama) left port, they pursued her in a boat and helicopter, filming as they went. They continued to do so until she submerged, giving them the footage they needed to incorporate into the film.

=== Music ===
The musical score for Crimson Tide was composed by Hans Zimmer and employs a blend of orchestra, choir, and synthesizer sounds. It includes additional music by Nick Glennie-Smith, who also conducted the orchestra, and the choir was conducted by Harry Gregson-Williams. It was released on physical formats on May 16, 1995, by Hollywood Records. Within the score is the well-known naval hymn, "Eternal Father, Strong to Save". The score won a Grammy Award in 1996 for Best Instrumental Composition Written for a Motion Picture or for Television, and Zimmer has described it as one of his personal favorites.

== Release ==
=== Home video ===
Crimson Tide was first released on VHS on November 14, 1995. A THX certified LaserDisc would then debut that month, which featured a Dolby Digital AC-3 track, a behind-the-scenes featurette, and a theatrical trailer.

An unrated extended version was released on DVD on May 16, 2006. The film premiered on Blu-ray on February 5, 2008.

== Reception ==
=== Box office ===
Crimson Tide earned $18.6 million in the United States on its opening weekend, ranked #1 for all films released that week. The film would hold the record for having Denzel Washington's highest opening weekend for five years until 2000 when Remember the Titans beat it. Overall, it earned $91 million in the U.S. and an additional $66 million internationally, for $157.3 million.

=== Critical reception ===
The film received mostly positive reviews from critics. Review aggregator Rotten Tomatoes reports that 89% of 53 critics have given the film a positive review, with a rating average of 7.5/10. The consensus reads, "Boasting taut, high energy thrills and some cracking dialogue courtesy of an uncredited Quentin Tarantino, Crimson Tide finds director Tony Scott near the top of his action game." Audiences polled by CinemaScore gave the film an average grade of "A" on an A+ to F scale.

Roger Ebert of the Chicago Sun-Times wrote, "This is the rare kind of war movie that not only thrills people while they're watching it, but invites them to leave the theater actually discussing the issues," and ultimately gave the film three and a half stars out of four. Meanwhile, Mick LaSalle of the San Francisco Chronicle wrote, "Crimson Tide has everything you could want from an action thriller and a few other things you usually can't hope to expect."

Owen Gleiberman of Entertainment Weekly wrote that "what makes Crimson Tide a riveting pop drama is the way the conflict comes to the fore in the battle between two men. ... The end of the world may be around the corner, but what holds us is the sight of two superlatively fierce actors working at the top of their game."

=== Awards and nominations ===
Crimson Tide was nominated for three Academy Awards, for Film Editing (Chris Lebenzon), Sound (Kevin O'Connell, Rick Kline, Gregory H. Watkins and William B. Kaplan) and Sound Editing (George Watters II), but lost to Apollo 13 and Braveheart respectively.

== Influence ==
Robert S. Mueller, in his years as FBI Director, often quoted a line by Gene Hackman's character Captain Ramsey in his meetings with the senior leadership of the FBI: "We're here to preserve democracy, not to practice it."

== Sequel ==
In July 2025, Bruckheimer revealed in an interview on The Rich Eisen Show that a sequel to Crimson Tide was in development. He stated that an undisclosed writer and director have been attached to the project and that conversations with the U.S. Navy were taking place. He also expressed confidence in Washington reprising his role in the sequel saying, "If we give him a good script, I think he'd do it.
