= Extreme PaintBrawl =

1998 video game

- Developer: Creative Carnage
- Publisher: Head Games Publishing
- Designers: Carlos Cuello; Andre Lowe; Joe Wilcox
- Composer: Todd Duane
- Engine: Build
- Platforms: Windows, MS-DOS (Note: The installer and menus are Windows-based while the game runs in DOS mode.)
- Release: NA: October 20, 1998
- Genre: First-person shooter
- Modes: Single-player, multiplayer

Extreme PaintBrawl is a paintball video game released for MS-DOS and Windows on October 20, 1998. The game is considered to be one of the worst video games ever made. Extreme PaintBrawl was developed in two weeks using the Build engine; its soundtrack was composed by musician Todd Duane, who sent his demo tracks to Head Games. The game was followed by Extreme PaintBrawl 2 in 1999, Ultimate PaintBrawl 3 in 2000, and Extreme PaintBrawl 4 in 2002, all of which were met with negative reviews.

Despite being "distinguished as the first non-violent 3D shooter" by the Philadelphia Daily News, prior examples of non-violent first-person shooters have existed on the market a few years before Extreme PaintBrawl: Super 3D Noah's Ark by Christian video game developer Wisdom Tree and Chex Quest, an advergame total conversion of Doom for children.

== Gameplay ==
In Extreme PaintBrawl, there are three game modes available to the player: Season Mode, Single Game, and Practice. Season Mode allows the player to manage a team of eight recruits through an entire season. The player is able to hire and fire recruits, buy markers, and compete against other teams for the championship in compliance with a fixed schedule. There were several flaws in this mode, such as the inability to swap markers between recruits. Single Game allows the player to play a single paintball match. The objective is to score by either capturing the opponent's flag or marking an opponent. Practice mode leaves the player alone on their chosen field with no specific targets to shoot.

== Reception ==
Extreme PaintBrawl received extremely negative reviews; criticism was directed toward its use of the obsolete Build engine, lack of game modes beyond a variation of capture the flag, maps that did not resemble actual paintball fields at all, an unfitting soundtrack, and a practice mode that only allowed players to roam through a map without any enemies or targets. The game was also plagued by bizarre AI behavior, including computer-controlled teammates getting caught near doors and walls or standing still in open areas of the map, but also being able to exhibit perfect aim.

Marc Dultz of GameSpot gave Extreme PaintBrawl a 1.7/10, stating that the game took the first-person shooter genre too far by trying to "wed a tired game engine with the paintball phenomenon." Its AI was criticized for being "perhaps one of the worst attempts at modeling a team sport" due to its inconsistent behavior, and the game was also criticized for making it too difficult to distinguish between enemies and allies. In conclusion, Extreme PaintBrawl was considered to be "perhaps one of the worst games I've seen in years, as much out of touch with reality as it is out of step with the gaming world at large." Raphael Liberatore additionally noted performance issues and a poor graphical user interface in his review of the game for Computer Gaming World, giving it a rating of one out of five stars. Writing for IGN, Tal Blevins gave Extreme PaintBrawl a 0.7/10, making it the second-lowest score the site has ever given to a video game. The review remarked that the soundtrack was the only aspect of the entire game that could constitute being described as "extreme".

Later reviews have maintained a similar negative reception towards Extreme PaintBrawl; Richard Cobbett of PC Gamer named the game as one of the 15 worst PC games of all time in 2010, remarking that "things that didn't make it into this first and final build included functional AI, multiplayer code that could connect to other computers, characters who didn't walk through walls, or any sense of fun whatsoever."

== Sequels ==
The game spawned a number of sequels.

Extreme PaintBrawl 2 was released for Microsoft Windows on November 15, 1999. The game was developed by Hoplite Research and published by Head Games. The game uses a modified version of the Genesis3D engine. The game was criticised for its AI, as the player's teammates constantly run into walls and get stuck anywhere possible. IGN gave the game a score of 2.6/10.

Extreme PaintBrawl 4 was developed by Cat Daddy Games and published by Activision Value. It was released on May 13, 2002. It was a re-release of Ultimate PaintBrawl 3. The game received negative reviews due to outdated graphics and a broken multiplayer mode. GameSpot gave the game a 2.4/10, and IGN gave it a 4.0/10.
