= Kingpin: Life of Crime =

1999 video game

- Developer: Xatrix Entertainment
- Publisher: Interplay Entertainment
- Director: Drew Markham
- Programmer: Rafael Paiz
- Artists: Michael Kaufman; Viktor Antonov
- Composer: Cypress Hill
- Engine: Original; Quake II engine Reloaded; Unity; KaPe Engine
- Platforms: Linux, Microsoft Windows
- Release: NA: June 28, 1999; EU: July 9, 1999; AU: 1999; WW: December 5, 2023 (Reloaded)
- Genre: First-person shooter
- Modes: Single-player, multiplayer

Kingpin: Life of Crime is a 1999 first-person shooter developed by Xatrix Entertainment and published by Interplay Entertainment. The game begins with the player character wounded and beaten up by associates of the crime boss The Kingpin, and the story follows his thirst for revenge. Released shortly after the Columbine High School massacre, the game attracted controversy due to the overall timing of its release; thus, it was not sold by various retailers in the US, despite receiving generally positive reviews from critics. The game was also ported to Linux.

In 2020, 3D Realms announced a partnership with Interplay Entertainment to release a remastered version of the game, titled Kingpin: Reloaded. It was initially planned for a release later that same year, but due to development issues the game got delayed. It was eventually released on December 5, 2023 for PC.

== Background ==
Set in a quasi-retro time period, Kingpin features a mix of 1930s art deco crossed with modern technology and ideas. Many inventions are conveyed through an art deco style design, like helicopters and monorail networks. The setting is described by the game manual as a past that never happened. According to artist Viktor Antonov, the game was initially envisioned as "like Blade Runner with a gangster touch", before hip-hop group Cypress Hill got associated to the project, which in turn influenced the setting of the game, causing the science-fiction elements to be phased out in favor of a "realistic city".

Set in a city, the world of Kingpin revolves around crime and criminals. The game begins in the most desolate and deprived area of the city, Skidrow, a dystopia where the population consists entirely of criminal elements, prostitutes, and transients. It is here that the player character has been left, after being beaten up by some thugs under the employ of Nikki Blanco, one of The Kingpin's lieutenants. For some reason not explained within the game, Nikki Blanco wants the player out of his territory for good, and the beating is a warning that should he ever return, he can expect much worse.

Kingpin is a game about revenge. Picking up a piece of lead piping as a makeshift weapon, the player plots against Nikki Blanco and The Kingpin himself. The player's rise to prominence, and his lust for revenge will take him through various areas of the city: from chemical plants through to steel mills and train yards, and eventually onto Radio City, home of The Kingpin's headquarters.

The game was influenced by the films Pulp Fiction and The Big Lebowski which features many lines of dialogue and characters lifted from both films. A few primary examples would be the main antagonist "The Kingpin" being heavily inspired by the Marsellus Wallace character from Pulp Fiction. The boss player's encounter known as "The Jesus" shares the same name and personality as the John Turturro character from The Big Lebowski. Much of the NPC dialogue is lifted from film characters. Many generic NPCs will say "Forget about it huh", which is another line from The Big Lebowski and many female NPCs will quote Jules Winfield from Pulp Fiction with such lines as the "That's cool and the gang!" phrase.

== Gameplay ==
Gameplay in Kingpin was most noted for its profanity-laden dialog and its graphic depiction of violence. An idea incorporated into the game was that of area-specific damage: a shot to the head deals more damage than a shot on the leg. To complement this, each game character also has a deformable skin, which indicates where and how badly the character had been injured. Injured characters also bleed, and leave a blood trail making it easier to follow them. Instead of having a universal armor value for the player, armor is split into three different types, helmet, body armor and leggings, with separate values for each one.

Another innovative feature of the game is the use of weapon modifications. Various mods can be used to upgrade the weapons in the game. The pistol, for example, can be modified to increase its firepower, or its rate of fire, among other things.

Kingpin also features heavy NPC interaction for a first-person shooter; the player can interact with NPCs and choose between positive or negative responses. This can lead to various outcomes such as gleaning new information, hiring gang members, or provoking an enemy into attacking. The NPC response to the player also takes into account whether the player's gun is holstered or not. Some areas, such as bars and clubs, which acted as hubs for the chapters, force the player to lower his weapon. The player can also hire gang members to join him, and in some cases this is necessary as the player would need an AI character's specific skill.

Another new feature is the introduction of cash. Fallen enemies can be searched for cash, which can then be used to purchase weapons and ammunition at the Pawn-O-Matic, a shop found in every chapter, except in chapter five. Cash can also be used to hire gang members.

== Soundtrack ==
The soundtrack for Kingpin was provided by the rap group Cypress Hill, and featured three tracks from their album IV. These were: "16 Men Till There's No Men Left", "Checkmate", and "Lightning Strikes". Alongside the full versions of these tracks, instrumental versions with the vocals removed were used as backing tracks. Cypress Hill also provided some of the voice acting for the game. Prior to the game's release, the group's song "I Ain't Goin' Out Like That" was used for the initial trailer in 1998. The song and "How I Could Just Kill a Man" were initially going to be included in the game, but was scrapped in favor of the tracks off of the newer IV album. According to producer Drew Markham, Cypress Hill's involvement prompted the team to make a more grounded and gritty approach to the overall setting.

On the initial UK release of the game, a free Ministry of Sound album was bundled with the game.

== Controversy ==
Kingpin received a fair amount of controversy due to its graphic depiction of violence and heavy use of profanity. The game picked up increased media attention because it was the first high-profile first-person shooter to be released since the Columbine High School massacre. At that point, computer games were facing increasing pressure from Congress and lobby groups seeking an answer to what had influenced the Columbine killers.

Calls for Xatrix to cancel the game were made by various congressmen; the game was debated on the floor of the US senate and was singled out for criticism in the National Institute on Media and the Family's 1999 report on violent video games. In a response to this, Xatrix implemented a "safe" version, a password-protected game mode, which meant that the game would play with low violence and bleeped out swearing. Xatrix also stressed that Kingpin was not in any way, shape or form aimed or marketed at minors, with a warning message during the installation stage from Xatrix CEO Drew Markham himself:

"In light of the recent acts of youth-related violence that have taken place across America we thought that you should know how 'Kingpin' was initially conceived. Kingpin was never intended for children. This is a game with mature themes made for a mature audience. There was never any attempt to market or influence children to buy Kingpin."

Still, the controversy led various retailers to not stock the game, including Best Buy, Wal-Mart and Toys "R" Us. Xatrix team member Greg Goodrich would claim later that "If it wasn't for Electronics Boutique, the game might have never seen the light of day in North America."

== Reception ==
Reception

Aggregate score
Aggregator	Score
GameRankings	78%

Review scores
Publication	Score
CNET Gamecenter	8/10
Computer Games Strategy Plus	2.5/5
Computer Gaming World	4/5
Computer and Video Games	5/5
Edge	8/10
GamePro	2/5
GameRevolution	B−
GameSpot	7.3/10
IGN	8.3/10
Next Generation	3/5
PC Accelerator	7/10
PC Gamer (UK)	90%
PC Gamer (US)	53%
PC PowerPlay	86%
PC Zone	92%
Entertainment Weekly	(Adults) B (Kids) F

The game received positive reviews according to the review aggregation website GameRankings. Erik Wolpaw of GameSpot was particularly impressed at the way that Xatrix had used the then two-year-old Quake II engine, calling the game world a "beautifully depicted metropolitan nightmare". Jay Boor of IGN enjoyed the game, noting its excellent level design and the advanced NPC interaction. PC Gamer UK described the game as "an incredible achievement in terms of graphics, AI and level design and a nasty, bloody swear-fest". Incidentally, the most negative reaction to the game came from Stephen Poole of the publication's US edition, who rated the game 53% (out of 100%) and felt that the game was too shallow, offered nothing new to the genre, and was peppered with bugs and oversights. In contrast, the most positive reception came from Computer and Video Games, who scored the game five stars (out of five total), and concluded with "It plays like a dream and will have you whooping with joy after every level is successfully completed." John Lee of NextGen said of the game, "Although it doesn't stick to its theme of street-level crime, there's more than enough action and shocks to keep your interest." PC Zone concluded that "If you've got a strong stomach and [you] aren't offended by foul and abusive language, then Kingpin: Life of Crime is a beautiful thing, and one which could open the floodgates for more adult games."

Initially for July 1999, the game had ranked No. 19 as the best-selling PC game of the month, as tracked by PC Data in the US. NPD Techworld, the firm that bought out PC Data and also tracked sales in the US, reported 76,189 units sold of the game by December 2002 in the US. Overseas in the UK, the game fared better, and debuted as the No. 1 best-selling PC game for the month of September, as tracked by ELSPA. It would sink to No. 6 in October and slightly rise to No. 5 in November before leaving the charts completely.

Kingpin was nominated for PC PowerPlay's "Best Music" and "Best Firstperson [sic] Shooter (Single Player)" awards, both of which went to Half-Life. Kingpin was also a runner-up in PC Format's "Best Shoot 'em Up Game" and Level's "First Person Shooter" categories, which was ultimately won by Quake III Arena and Aliens vs. Predator respectively.

== Legacy and Kingpin: Reloaded ==
Multiplayer for Kingpin was previously hosted on both heat.net and Mplayer.com in the late 1990s and early 2000s. Afterwards, multiplayer was hosted on Gamespy Arcade. Once Gamespy dissolved in 2014, the multiplayer was shifted to be primarily ran by an online fan community at kingpin.info which contains a large archival library of downloads and active servers.

Kingpin would prove to be Xatrix's last game; on the day that Kingpin shipped, Xatrix Entertainment ceased to exist. Many of their team reformed later to create Gray Matter Studios. A sequel to Kingpin was in production at Interplay in 2004 for the PC and Xbox with a 2005 release date, but nothing came of the project.

In 2014, the long-thought lost source code and publishing rights for Kingpin was questioned by Slipgate Studios' Frederik Schreiber. In 2016, Herve Caen responded, and confirmed that Interplay still held the rights to the game, but did not mention the source code. These two interactions would ultimately manifest in a remastering of the game by 3D Realms (where Schreiber would later work for), announced in January 2020 as Kingpin: Reloaded. Initially set to be released later that same year, the missing source code required the developers to ultimately reverse engineer the original game, resulting in a delay. Kingpin: Reloaded was eventually released on December 5, 2023 for PC, while release dates for other platforms remained unannounced.
