= Richard P. Henrick =

American novelist and screenwriter

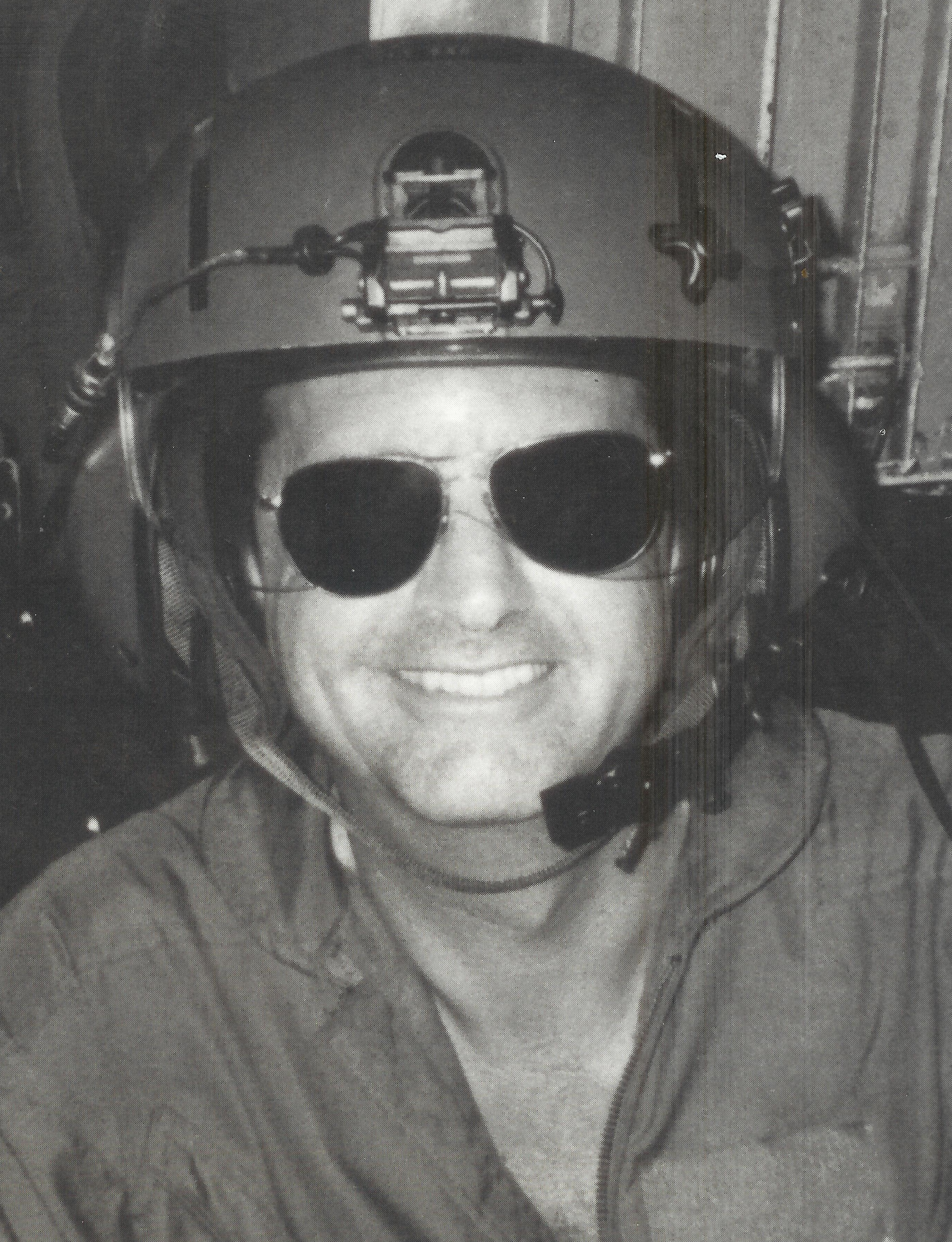
- Born: Richard Paul Henrick; St. Louis, Missouri, U.S.
- Occupation: Author
- Spouse: Carol Henrick
- Writing career
- Genre: Thriller

Richard Paul Henrick is an American novelist and screenwriter whose works include Crimson Tide, Attack on the Queen and Nightwatch. A recognized master of naval fiction and submarine adventure, he has published over 18 books in numerous different countries and languages. He was born in St. Louis, Missouri where he still works. He resides in Wildwood, Missouri.

== Bibliography ==
- Silent Warriors (1985)
- The Phoenix Odyssey (1986)
- Counterforce (1987)
- Flight of the Condor (1987)
- When Duty Calls (1988)
- Beneath the Silent Sea (1988)
- Vampire In Moscow (1988)
- Under the Ice (1988)
- Cry of the Deep (1989)
- Sea Devil (1990)
- The Golden U-boat (1991)
- Sea of Death (1992)
- Dive to Oblivion (1993)
- Ecowar (1993)
- Ice Wolf (1994)
- Crimson Tide (1995), novelization
- Attack on the Queen (1998)
- Nightwatch (1999)
