= Toujane =

Coordinates: 33°28′N 10°08′E

Toujane (Arabic: توجان) is a Berber Matmata mountain village in the south of Tunisia, near Medenine, divided into two parts by a valley. It is most notably remembered for its World War II importance.

== In popular culture ==
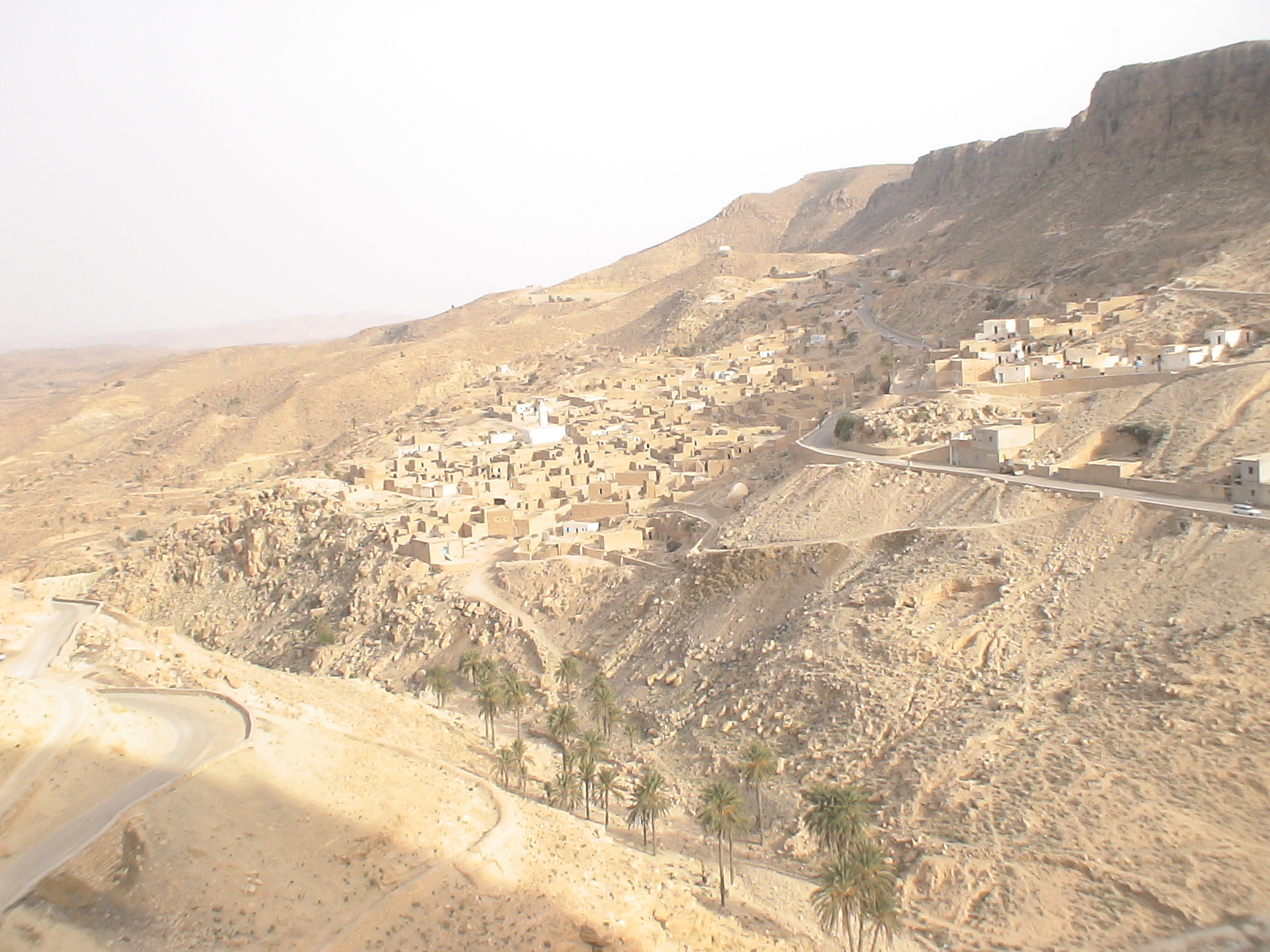
View of Toujane in 2005

The village is featured in the 2005 video game Call of Duty 2, both as a mission in the single-player campaign and as a multiplayer map. The game features the mission "Retaking Lost Ground" (Toujane, Tunisia - March 11, 1943) and the later Battle of the Mareth Line.

Scenes from the film La folle de Toujane (1974, by René Vautier) were filmed in this village.
