= Redneck Rampage Rides Again =

1998 video game

- Developer: Xatrix Entertainment
- Publisher: Interplay Entertainment
- Series: Redneck Rampage
- Engine: Build
- Platform: MS-DOS
- Release: NA: May 13, 1998; EU: 1998
- Genre: First-person shooter
- Mode: Single-player

Redneck Rampage Rides Again is a video game developed by Xatrix Entertainment and published by Interplay Entertainment for MS-DOS in 1998. It was rereleased on Steam for Microsoft Windows on June 5, 2017, and for macOS on June 18. The game is supported by the BuildGDX, Rednukem and Raze source ports.

== Gameplay ==
Redneck Rampage Rides Again is the sequel to Redneck Rampage and also uses the Build engine. The 12 all-new levels take players back to the alien-besieged town of Hickston. New characters include a cheerleader Daisy Mae and Frank Doyle, a biker. The game revolves around searching for Bubba and Leonard, while facing off aliens and local residents. Similar to Redneck Rampage, power-up system exists (pork rinds, cow pies, whiskey) with two scales (Dunkometer and Gunkometer) that track the performance of the players in four parts each. Every monster has to be defeated in order to progress in the level. Some of the enemies are new, including Jack O'Lope, an over-sized rodent. The players can use weapons like crossbow or shotgun in order to battle.

The soundtrack was done by Mojo Nixon, who also appeared in a cameo role.

== Reception ==
Reception

Review scores
Publication	Score
Computer Games Strategy Plus	2.5/5
Computer Gaming World	1.5/5
Game Informer	6/10
GameSpot	7.9/10
Hyper	73%
Next Generation	3/5
PC Accelerator	2/10
PC Gamer (US)	78%
PC PowerPlay	48%

The game received mixed reviews. Next Generation said of the game, "Sure, it doesn't look all that great, the control is a little peculiar, and the game has its tedious and frustrating moments, but if you buy into the redneck premise, it's good for enough belly laughs to keep players coming back. Frankly, any game that calls its invincibility cheat 'Elvis Mode' can't be all bad."
