= Michael Schiffer =

American film producer

- Born: Philadelphia, Pennsylvania, U.S.
- Occupations: Screenwriter, video game writer, film producer

Michael Schiffer is an American screenwriter, video game writer and film producer.

Schiffer is known for such films and video games as Colors, Lean on Me, Crimson Tide, The Four Feathers, The Peacemaker and the first three main entries of Call of Duty games.

== Early life ==
Michael Schiffer was born on July 6, 1948, and raised in Philadelphia, Pennsylvania, the son of Ralph Schiffer and Dorothy (née Wilson).

== Filmography ==
=== Film ===
Year	Title	Writer	Producer
1988	Colors	Yes	No
1989	Lean on Me	Yes	associate
1995	Crimson Tide	Yes	No
1997	The Peacemaker	Yes	No
1998	Very Bad Things	No	Yes
2002	The Four Feathers	Yes	No
2003	Le Divorce	No	Yes

Other credits

Year	Title	Role
2005	Rib Shack	"Special Thanks" credit
2019	The Painted Bird	story consultant

=== Video games ===
- Call of Duty (2003)
- Call of Duty: Finest Hour (2004)
- Call of Duty 2 (2005)
