= Redneck Rampage =

1997 video game

- Developer: Xatrix Entertainment
- Publishers: Interplay Productions; Logicware (Mac OS)
- Director: Drew Markham
- Producers: Chris Benson; Bill Dugan; Greg Goodrich
- Designer: Drew Markham
- Programmers: Rafael Paiz; Barry Dempsey
- Artists: Michael Kaufman; Claire Praderie
- Composers: Mojo Nixon; Reverend Horton Heat; Beat Farmers; Cement Pond
- Engine: Build
- Platforms: MS-DOS; Mac OS
- Release: DOS/Windows: NA: April 23, 1997; UK: May 2, 1997; Mac OS: NA: 1999
- Genre: First-person shooter
- Modes: Single-player, multiplayer

Redneck Rampage is a 1997 first-person shooter game developed by Xatrix Entertainment and published by Interplay. The game has a hillbilly theme, primarily taking place in a fictional Arkansas town. Many of the weapons and power-ups border on the nonsensical, and in some ways the game is a parody of both first-person shooter games and rural American life. It features music by psychobilly and cowpunk artists such as The Beat Farmers and Mojo Nixon.

The game was re-released on GOG.com and Steam with support for Windows and macOS. The game is supported by the BuildGDX, Rednukem and Raze source ports.

== Gameplay ==
Redneck Rampage is a first-person shooter.

The game offers a variety of ways for the character to regenerate health or hit points. These power-ups consist of moon pies, pork rinds, and alcohol. A small supply of each can be carried for future use (the two exceptions being pork rinds and Delicious Googoo Clusters, which are used automatically upon being picked up). Each of these power-ups has distinct disadvantages: The more food the character eats, the more flatulent he becomes (represented by a "gut" meter in the user display), making it difficult to sneak up on enemies as the character moves forward and make a distinct fart sound frequently after eating. However, eating food does decrease the "drunk meter" slightly.

When drinking alcohol, the health gets restored and as an added benefit the character becomes somewhat less affected by enemy fire. This only works to a minor degree, and the more the character drinks, the less coordinated he becomes. Alcohol consumption is measured on a "drunk meter" in the user display. After consuming a large amount of alcohol, the character's movements will become erratic and the user will have difficulty controlling the character as he moves in directions that do not correspond to the input on the keyboard. The in-game video will also become grainy and less viewable. At the maximum drunk level, the character would simply fall down, followed by the sounds of vomiting and the loss of all motor regardless of user input. All of these effects would pass after a few minutes as the character sobered up. During this time, the character cannot use weapons and is essentially defenseless. The side effects of both power-up types forced the user to use them sparingly and gave another reason to avoid damage during gameplay. However, one other power-up, moonshine, gives the player increased speed for a brief amount of time, at the end of which both the "drunk meter" and the "gut meter" will reset to zero.

== Plot ==
The game's plot revolves around two brothers, Leonard and Bubba, fighting through the fictional towns of Hickston and Taylortown, Arkansas to rescue their prized pig Bessie and thwart an alien invasion. The brothers battle through such locales as a meat packing plant and a trailer park, and battle evil clones of their neighbors. There are also male and female alien enemies. The bosses are Assface, and the leader of the alien invasion, the Queen Vixen.

== Add-ons and spin-offs ==
Redneck Rampage: Suckin' Grits on Route 66 is a 12-level expansion pack for Redneck Rampage. It was developed by Sunstorm Interactive and released on December 19, 1997. The add-on contains several new locations and textures, as well as a new ending.

Redneck Deer Huntin' is a hunting game for the PC using the same engine as the previous games in the series. It was developed by Xatrix Entertainment and released in 1998.

Redneck Rampage Rides Again is the sequel to Redneck Rampage, and includes 14 new single player levels, 7 new multiplayer levels, new enemies, weapons, and vehicles, including motorcycles and swamp boats. After Leonard and Bubba crash-land a UFO, they find themselves in the middle of the desert (Area 69). Along the way, they are hunted by aliens and must blast their way through jackalope farms, Disgraceland, a riverboat, a brothel and various other locales. It was developed by Xatrix Entertainment and released in the week following May 13, 1998.

Off-Road Redneck Racing is a spin-off racing game released in 2001 for the PC. Unlike the previous games, it was not developed by Xatrix, but instead by Rage Games; however, Interplay remained the owner of the IP, and thus they published it. Besides the game's namesake, the only relation to the previous games are of Leonard and Bubba on the box art, borrowed voice lines of Leonard from the original games sporadically used during a race, and slightly similar textures being used on some artwork and also in-game. This is the only game in the series not to use the Build game engine.

Compilations and demos include:

- The Cuss Pack is an add-on which added stronger language to the game that was released on July 16, 1997. The add-on was available for download on Interplay's online store, but users had to pay $1 with a credit card to ensure that the buyer of the add-on was of adult age. The add-on was included on the CD for the Mac OS version.
- The Early Years is a limited version of Redneck Rampage put out by SoftKey, which allows players to play the first five levels. It also features eight multiplayer deathmatch levels.
- Possum Bayou is an alternate limited version of Redneck Rampage released on September 30, 1998, which allows players to play the first seven levels. It does not have any multiplayer options.
- Redneck Icechest of Value is a compilation that includes Redneck Rampage: Suckin Grits on Route 66.
- Redneck Rampage/Redneck Rides Again Dual Jewel is a compilation that includes Redneck Rampage Rides Again.
- Redneck Rampage: Family Reunion is a compilation that includes the original game, the Cuss Pack add-on, Redneck Rampage: Suckin Grits on Route 66 and Redneck Rampage Rides Again. Another edition of the Family Reunion contains only the original game and Rides Again.
- Gamefest: Redneck Classics includes the original game, Redneck Rampage: Suckin' Grits on Route 66, Redneck Rampage Rides Again, Redneck Deer Huntin', Redneck Rampage Theme Windows 95 theme pack, and a Redneck Rampage Screen Saver.
- Redneck Rampage Collection includes all but Redneck Deer Huntin' and Off-Road Redneck Racing.

== Reception ==
In the United States, Redneck Rampage debuted at #7 on PC Data's computer game sales chart for May 1997. It claimed 13th place the following month, before falling to positions 17 and 20 in July and August, respectively.

Reviews for the title were mixed. Arinn Dembo, writing for Cnet Gamecenter, gave the game three stars, and said it deserved "big points for its psychobilly soundtrack", "big points for being genuinely funny at times", and offered "good fun using a crowbar to beat aliens, 'Old Coots' and 'Billy Rays' to death".

Next Generation reviewed the PC version of the game, rating it three stars out of five, and stated that "As creative as much of this game is, its gameplay is same-old, same-old. It's fun, but when it's over, you're more likely to remember the 'Yee-has' and health-replenishing whisky bottles instead of any of the challenge or gameplay." Power Unlimited gave the PC version a score of 91% writing: "Very extensive levels, beautiful levels and very cool slogans in between. Redneck Rampage is Whiiiiooooo!"

Redneck Rampage was nominated for "PC Action Game of the Year" during the Academy of Interactive Arts & Sciences' inaugural Interactive Achievement Awards.
