= Redneck Deer Huntin' =

1998 video game

- Developer: Xatrix Entertainment
- Publisher: Interplay Entertainment
- Series: Redneck Rampage
- Engine: Build
- Platform: MS-DOS
- Release: NA: July 31, 1998; EU: 1998
- Genre: Sports
- Mode: Single-player

Redneck Deer Huntin' (released in Europe as Deer Stalker) is a hunting simulation video game developed by Xatrix Entertainment and published by Interplay Entertainment for MS-DOS and Microsoft Windows in 1998. It is a spinoff of the 1997 first-person shooter Redneck Rampage. It was later re-released for Steam (both Windows and macOS) in 2017.

== Gameplay ==
The player controls Leonard, the protagonist of the Redneck Rampage series. Using one of five weapons (.44 Magnum revolver, .30-06 hunting rifle, .30-06 hunting rifle with scope, 12-gauge pump-action shotgun, and crossbow) and a variety of bait and calls, Leonard traverses one of four large, open hunting areas searching for wild animals to shoot, including deer, wild boars, turkeys, and ducks. There are also two target ranges where the player can practice firing their weapons at both mobile and stationary targets.

== Reception ==
Reception

Review scores
Publication	Score
CNET Gamecenter	4/10
GameStar	28%
PC Accelerator	1/10
PC Games (DE)	22%
PC Games (US)	C
PC PowerPlay	16%
PCmanía	77%
Power Play	18%
Reset	3/10

The game received generally very negative reviews. PC PowerPlay lambasted the concept of blending real hardships faced by hunters in a controversial sport with the farce of the Redneck Rampage franchise and called Redneck Deer Huntin' a rushed game powered by an antiquated engine with low-quality environments and a dull experience. Giving the game its lowest possible rating, PC Accelerator similarly criticized the quality of the graphics, recounted the failure of the player abilities to attract targets, and called the game "a poor excuse for a boring genre that just won't die." GameStar also found the crude graphics to be problematic for distant objects and chasing prey to soon become boring and considered the game a form of cheap entertainment lacking obvious enjoyable features. Power Play was fascinated by then-recent player interest in hunting games such as Redneck Deer Huntin', which it considered so bland and purposeless that even a Windows screensaver is more exciting.

Reset criticized the game's sound design and lack of realism, finding it limited to running and shooting against a three-minute timer. German magazine PC Games thought that shooting prey was too easy. American magazine PC Games, while sharing many of the other critics' sentiments, was somewhat less harsh. It noted that Redneck Deer Huntin' is the first of Deer Hunter clones with 3D environments, but it, too, found the environments unimaginative and also finding prey difficult. Gamecenter, likewise sparing in its use of criticism and admitting not having had qualms about Deer Hunter, praised the shooting range and the Build Engine's flexibility for free movement, but wrote off the game as a cheap opportunistic rip-off of the hunting game enthusiasm that is not worth $19.95 (equivalent to $39.41 in 2025). In contrast to the negative consensus among critics, PCmanía's review was positive, finding the game suitable for fans of hunting simulators, only lamenting the choice of a dated engine such as Build and sprites for imagery.

The game sold over 100,000 units.
