= Gray Matter Studios =

American video game developer

Gray Matter Interactive Studios, Inc.
- Formerly: Xatrix Entertainment, Inc. (1993–1999)
- Type: Subsidiary
- Industry: Video games
- Founded: March 1993; 33 years ago
- Founders: Drew Markham; Barry Dempsey
- Defunct: 2005
- Fate: Merged into Treyarch
- Headquarters: Los Angeles, US
- Key people: Drew Markham (creative director)
- Number of employees: 18–20 (2001)
- Parent: Activision (2002–2005)

Gray Matter Interactive Studios, Inc. (Gray Matter Studios; formerly Xatrix Entertainment, Inc.) was an American video game developer based in Los Angeles.

== History ==
Drew Markham and his business partner Barry Dempsey founded Xatrix Entertainment in March 1993. The studio's first release was Cyberia in 1994. Among its later projects was Quake II Mission Pack: The Reckoning, for which it worked with publisher Activision. Around 1999, some of the original business partners sought to exit the company. To handle this efficiently, Xatrix was transferred to a new corporation under Markham as creative director. With the assistance of Activision, Gray Matter Studios was established on June 17, 1999, and took over most of the former employees. Activision initially owned 40% of the studio. It bought the remaining 60% in January 2002, after the successful release of Return to Castle Wolfenstein. The publisher paid 133,690 shares of common stock, at the time worth around US$3.2 million. Post-acquisition, the studio was put to work on the Call of Duty: United Offensive expansion. It also worked on Trinity: The Shatter Effect, which was announced and then canceled in late 2003. In 2005, during the development of Call of Duty 2: Big Red One, Gray Matter Studios was merged into Activision's Treyarch studio. As part of Treyarch, the former Gray Matter Studios team worked on Call of Duty 3.

== Games developed ==
=== As Xatrix Entertainment ===
Year	Title
1994	Cyberia
1995	Cyberia 2: Resurrection
1997	Redneck Rampage
1998	Redneck Rampage Rides Again
1998	Redneck Deer Huntin'
1998	Quake II Mission Pack: The Reckoning
1999	Kingpin: Life of Crime

=== As Gray Matter Studios ===
Year	Title
2001	Return to Castle Wolfenstein
2004	Call of Duty: United Offensive

=== Canceled ===
- Trinity: The Shatter Effect
