= List of commercial video games with later released source code =

This is a list of commercial video games with later released available source code. The source code of these commercially developed and distributed video games is available to the public or the games' communities.

== Background ==
Commercial video games are typically developed as proprietary closed source software products, with the source code treated as a trade secret (unlike open-source video games). When there is no more expected revenue, these games enter the end-of-life as a product with no support or availability for the game's users and community.

In several of the cases listed here, the game's developers released the source code expressly to prevent their work from becoming lost. Such source code is often released under varying (free and non-free, commercial and non-commercial) software licenses to the games' communities or the public; artwork and data are often released under a different license than the source code, as the copyright situation is different or more complicated. The source code may be pushed by the developers to public repositories (e.g. SourceForge or GitHub), or given to selected game community members, or sold with the game, or become available by other means. Source code availability in whatever form allows the games' communities to study how the game works, make modifications, and provide technical support themselves when the official support has ended, e.g. with unofficial patches to fix bugs or source ports to make the game compatible with new platforms.

Some developers that have released their source code have concluded that, in general terms, such action has not been harmful and even beneficial, among them Alec Holowka (Aquaria), Adam Saltsman (Canabalt), John Carmack (Wolfenstein 3D, Doom, Quake), Brian Hook (Quake II), and Terry Cavanagh (VVVVVV). Wolfire Games also noted (along with Saltsman) that releasing the source code didn't reduce sales. However, releasing the source code may and has led to clones using the original proprietary assets from the game, with two notable examples of games having clones thanks to the source release being Canabalt and Lugaru HD. Although Saltsman has noted that those clones can be removed from storefronts with a DMCA takedown notice, Jeff Rosen, co-founder of Wolfire Games, has recognized that such practices may discourage game developers from releasing their code.

== Lists ==
=== Open engine and game data ===
The games in this table were released under a free and open-source license with free content which allows reuse, modification and commercial redistribution of the whole game. Licenses can be public domain, GPL, BSD, Creative Commons, zlib, MIT, Artistic License or other (see Comparison of free and open-source software licenses).

Title	First release	Source code release	Genre	Engine license	Content license	Original developer	Additional information
Abuse	1995	2003	Run and gun	Public domain software	Public domain and Proprietary*	Crack dot Com	Game source code was released as public domain along with the shareware-released media files. Only shareware data, excluding the sound effects, is in the public domain; the rest is proprietary. In 2016 a community developer released a "20th anniversary source port" which enabled custom resolutions, OpenGL rendering, Xbox 360 controller support and fixed the music.
Adventureland	1978	1980	Text Adventure game	Public domain software	Public domain	Scott Adams	Scott Adams Adventureland's source code was published in SoftSide magazine in 1980 and the database format was subsequently used in other interpreters such as Brian Howarth's Mysterious Adventures series.
Alien Bash I+II	1993	2014	Run and gun	public domain software	public domain	Glen Cumming	Glen Cumming provided media and material of his Amiga games AlienBash and AlienBash II to the fan community, who was able to restore source code in 2014.
Ant-Eater	1983	2021	Maze	MIT	MIT	Eddy Fries	On March 30, 2021, Kay Savetz uploaded the source code for Ant-Eater (a Dig Dug clone), Princess and Frog (a Frogger clone), Sea Chase, and two unreleased video games by Ed Fries (of Halo 2600 fame) to GitHub under the MIT license with permission of Fries.
AstroMenace (now OpenAstroMenace)	2006	2007	Arcade	GPL-3.0-or-later	CC BY-SA 3.0	Viewizard	Based on AstroMenace which was released in February 2007 as shareware for Windows and freeware for Linux. Also the source code of another Viewizard game, the puzzle collection Memonix, was released.
Beyond the Titanic	1986	2009	Text adventure	GPL-2.0-or-later	GPL-2.0-or-later	Apogee Software	Game source released on March 20, 2009.
Bird Strike	1984	2021	Shoot 'em up	GPL-3.0	GPL-3.0	Andy Frigaard	On June 20, 2021, the source code for Bird Strike for the BBC Micro (one of the first releases by Firebird Software) was uploaded to GitHub under the GPLv3 by Andy Frigaard, the original developer.
Blades of Exile	1997	2007	RPG	GPL-2.0-only	GPL-2.0-only	Spiderweb Software	Source code and artwork was released by Jeff Vogel (Spiderweb Software) under a GPL license in June 2007.
Clonk series (now OpenClonk)	1994	2010/2014	Action, RTS, Platform	ISC	CC BY-SA 3.0	RedWolf Design / Matthes Bender	For the series (Clonk 1, Clonk 2 Debakel, Clonk 3 Radikal, Clonk 4 World, Clonk Planet, Clonk Endeavor and Clonk Rage) the C++ source code was released under the "Clonk Source Code License (ISC license)". The content of the original game series was released under the CC BY-NC. Based on Clonk Rage code base the community continues the development as OpenClonk under ISC license and content as CC BY-SA.
Colobot	2001	2012	Educational game, RTS	GPLv3	GPLv3	Epsitec SA	Game source released on March 26, 2012.
Colossal Cave Adventure	1976	2000/2005 (?)	Text Adventure	Public domain software / BSD (2017)	no artwork (Public domain software)	Will Crowther	Source code variants are at least available as far back as 2000. An authentic version was retrieved in 2005 "from a backup of Don Woods's student account at the Stanford Artificial Intelligence Lab (SAIL)". In February 2017 Eric S. Raymond was involved in the release of version 2.5 under the BSD license, the last release by the original author alone.
Cylindrix	1996	2001	Arcade, Shooter	LGPL-2.0-only	LGPL-2.0-only	Goldtree Enterprises / Softdisk	Around December 2001 the games was ported from DOS to Windows and released under the LGPL to the public.
Cytadela (or The Citadel)	1995	2006	FPS	GPL-3.0-or-later	GPL-3.0-or-later	Virtual Design	Upon its retail release, Cytadela received generally favorable reviews. In early 2006 the original Cytadela developer offered the Amiga source code of the FPS game to the community, which started a conversion project hosted on SourceForge. Ported to several platforms, latest version released in 2013.
Dandy	1983	2018	Dungeon crawl	Apache-2.0	Apache-2.0	John Howard Palevich	In March 2018 the source code for the Atari 8-bit version was released by Kevin Savetz with permission of Palevich. It was also uploaded to Palevich's own GitHub repository for Dandy which uses the Apache License 2.0, where he also maintains reverse engineered ports to a variety of programming languages.
Dragonfire	1982	2003	action	public domain software	public domain	Imagic / Bob Smith	Source code of this Imagic Atari 2600 game was released by developer Bob Smith on May 24, 2003, into the public domain. Many more Atari games got disassembled and commented by the Atari community.
Duelyst	2016	2023	CCG	MIT/CC0 (game engine/game code)	CC0	Counterplay Games	Almost three years later after the servers were shut down, Counterplay Games released the entire game (source code and assets), built on top of Backbone.js, to the public domain under the CC0 license on GitHub.
Eat The Whistle - France 98	1998	2004	Sports game	GPL-2.0-only	GPL-2.0-only	Hurricane Studios	The France 98 football Simulation video game was released for the Amiga in 1998. Around 2004 Eat the Whistle was released under the GPL-2.0-only on SourceForge. Later ported to many other platforms.
Escape Towards The Unknown	1998	2004	Point and click adventure	GPL-2.0-only	GPL-2.0-only	Hurricane Studios	Around 2004 Escape Towards The Unknown was released under the GPL-2.0-only on SourceForge, together with the Eat The Whistle. Later ported to many other platforms.
Fish Fillets (now Fish Fillets NG)	1998	2002	Puzzle	GPL-2.0-or-later	GPL-2.0-or-later	ALTAR Games	Released commercially as Fish Fillets in 1998. Source released in 2002 under the GPL.
Gladiator	1995	2002	top down perspective action game	GPLv2	GPLv2	Forgotten Sages Games	Released in 1995 as DOS shareware game, in 2002 the game's source code was released under GPL by the developers. Development and porting by the game's community continued on SourceForge under the name OpenGlad.
Glitch	2009	2013	MMO	CC0 (client and other parts)	CC0	Tinyspeck	In 2013, one year after the MMO was shut down, most of the artwork and parts of the code were released under the CC0 license.
God of Thunder	1993	2020	Puzzle video game	Public domain software	Public domain (music and sound effects); Freeware (game graphics)	Adept Software	On March 27, 2020, Ron Davis released the source code and sound assets as public domain on SourceForge.
Gravity Force 2	1994	2008	Multidirectional shooter	CC BY-SA 4.0	CC BY-SA 4.0	Jens Andersson & Jan Kronqvist	On September 21, 2008, the developers of the Amiga shareware title Gravity Force 2 released the source code for "nostalgic interest" without specified license. In April 2017 the authors clarified the game and source code license as CC BY-SA 4.0.
Habitat	1985	2016	early MMORPG	MIT	MIT	Randy Farmer and Chip Morningstar/Lucasfilm Games	The Museum of Art and Digital Entertainment received the game's source code from its original developers, and restored the code in a Hackathon. In July 2016, the source code was uploaded to GitHub under MIT license.
Halloween: The New Nightmare	2004	2021	FPS	GPLv3	GPLv3	Jadeware	Commercial indie game first released online and by mail order. Released on to GitHub in 2021.
Inside a Star-Filled Sky	2011	2011	Top-down shooter	Public domain software	Public domain	Jason Rohrer	Inside a Star-filled Sky, for purchase for $12, was put by developer Jason Rohrer into public domain, like many other of his games.
Kaiser II	1988	2003	economical simulation	GPL	GPL	Carsten Strotmann	In 2003 Kaiser II author Carsten Strotmann released the source code under the GPL as Free Software.
Kroz	1987	2009	Maze	GPL-2.0-or-later	GPL-2.0-or-later	Apogee Software	Game source released on March 20, 2009.
Lemonade Stand	1973	1979	Business simulation game	Public domain software	no artwork (Public domain software)	Bob Jamison, Charlie Kellner / MECC	The Applesoft BASIC source code was available since 1979. The game was later ported to modern REALbasic and released as free and open-source software for many platforms like Windows and MacOS.
Lugaru	2005	2010 / 2016 (assets)	Action-adventure game	GPL-2.0-or-later	CC BY-SA 3.0	Wolfire Games	Open sourced with the first Humble Indie Bundle by Wolfire Games. In November 2016 David Rosen relicensed all assets under the open content CC BY-SA 3.0 Creative Commons license which makes Lugaru a fully free video game. In begin 2017 an open source HD version followed.
Maelstrom	1992	1995/2010	Shoot 'em up	GPL-2.0-only	CC BY 3.0	Ambrosia Software	Asteroids clone. 1995 source released under GPL. In 2010 Andrew Welch and Ian Gilman released the game's contents under a Creative Commons license.
MegaBall	1991	2012	Breakout clone	Apache-2.0	Apache-2.0	Mackey Software/Ed Mackey	The Amiga game MegaBall was programmed by Mackey Software in 1991–1993. Inspired by Taito's Arkanoid it has several features more. The original author released in 2012 the source code of MegaBall under the Apache License v2.
NoGravity	1996	2005	3D space space shooter / Wing Commander	GPLv2	GPLv2	realtech VR	Source code released by realtech VR on February 16, 2005.
Nothing to Hide	2013	2013	Stealth game	CC0	CC0	Nicky Case	The crowdfunded surveillance/privacy-themed video game prototype by indie game developer Nicky Case was crowdfunded and opened under CC0 on GitHub between 2013 and 2015.
PaybackTime 2	1997	2014	turn-based tactics game	public domain software	public domain	Niko Nevatie and Kari Luojus	The turn-based tactics game, inspired by Laser Squad and UFO: Enemy Unknown, was developed by two Finnish students in Turbo Pascal and x86 assembly. They marketed their game as shareware for DOS in 1997. The authors released the game in August 2014 as public domain software, including the assets.
Pinball Construction Set	1983	2013	pinball video game	MIT	MIT	Bill Budge, Electronic Arts	In 2013, Budge released the source code to the Atari 8-bit and Apple II versions of Pinball Construction Set to the public on GitHub under the MIT license.
Planet Blupi	1997	2017	Platformer	GPL-3.0-or-later	GPL-3.0-or-later	Epsitec SA / Daniel Roux, Denis Dumoulin, Mathieu Schroeter	Planet Blupie was freed (source code and all media files) and ported to all major platforms (Linux, macOS and Windows) for its 20th anniversary, released open source under GPLv3 on GitHub in 2017. Speedy Blupi, part of Blupi series, has been released as freeware by EPSITEC too and is available at blupi.org.
Principia	2013	2022	Sandbox game	BSD 3-Clause	BSD 3-Clause	Bithack AB	Principia was announced to be made open source in 2016, but the source code was not released until 2022. Development of the game has since then been continued by the community after its source code release.
Spacewar!	1962	2003	Space combat	Public-domain software	Public domain	Steve Russell	Source code became available around 2003.
RuneSword II	2001	2004	Turn-based strategy	Public domain software	Public domain	CrossCut Games	In 2004 CrossCut Games released the game into the public domain on SourceForge. Since then there is continuous development by the community on the game.
Ryzom	2004	2010	MMORPG	AGPL-3.0-or-later	CC BY-SA 3.0	Nevrax	In response to the folding of Nevrax, the Free Ryzom Campaign was launched in order to gather enough funds from donations ("Crowdfunding") from the community to purchase Ryzom and release the game as free software. The campaign was almost successful with €172,988 of the required €200,000 gathered. On May 6, 2010, Winch Gate announced the full release of source code and artwork, and a partnership with the Free Software Foundation.
Seven Kingdoms	1996	2008	RTS	GPLv2	GPLv2 and Proprietary*	Enlight	Source code released by Enlight in November, 2008. *Music is proprietary
SimCity (Micropolis)	1989 (as SimCity)	2008 (as Micropolis)	City-building game	GPL-3.0-or-later	GPL-3.0-or-later	Maxis (Will Wright/Don Hopkins)	Source code released by Don Hopkins under GPL in 2008. For trademark reasons released under the original working title Micropolis, also known as OLPC SimCity.
Sissyfight 2000 Returns	2014	2018	Multiplayer	MIT	CC BY	Zimmerman, Clark, and Bhatnagar	On April 30, 2013, Zimmerman, Clark, and Bhatnagar announced a crowdfunding campaign on Kickstarter to revive Sissyfight. The campaign was funded on May 30, 2013, with a final total of $22,735. First Beta versions were released 2014. On February 9, 2018, the source code was released under the open-source MIT license and the assets under the CC BY Creative Commons license on GitHub.
Soldat	2002	2020	Run and gun	MIT	CC BY 4.0	Team Soldat	Source code was released under MIT license on GitHub, assets followed shortly after under CC BY 4.0.
Sopwith	1984	2000	Shoot 'em up	GPLv2	GPLv2	David L. Clark	The C and x86 assembly source code to Sopwith was released in 2000, at first under a non-commercial use license, but later under the GNU GPL at the request of fans.
Stunt Copter	mid 1986	?	Arcade	Public domain software	Public domain	Duane Blehm / HomeTown Software	After Duane Blehm death in 1988, his parents released Stunt Copter's and his other games' (like ZeroGravity, Cairo Shootout and PUZZ'L) binaries and source code into the public domain.
Super Lemonade Factory	2012	2012/2021	Puzzle-platform	MIT/MIT—GPL-3.0-only (game engine/game code)	GPL-3.0-only	Initialsgames	Based on the Flixel engine developed for the iOS version of Canabalt (that would later become part of HaxeFlixel), and inspired by it to release the source code, with the purpose of enabling source ports. The game was released as freeware on itch.io on February 2, 2021. The entire source code repository (source code and art assets) for the Ouya version was released under the GPL-3.0-only license on GitHub on February 4, 2021, to support the efforts for the preservation of Ouya games.
Supernova	1987	2009	Text adventure	GPL-2.0-or-later	GPL-2.0-or-later	Apogee Software	Game source released on March 20, 2009.
Triplane Turmoil	1996	2009	side-scrolling dogfighting flying game	GPLv3	GPLv3	Dodekaedron Software	In 1996 Triplane Turmoil was originally released as shareware DOS game. In 2009 Dodekaedron Software Creations Oy placed Triplane Turmoil's source code, documentation, images and sounds under the GPLv3, hosted on SourceForge. The community continued the support and ported the game to other platforms (Linux, Windows) via SDL.
Tyrian (now OpenTyrian)	1995	2007	Scrolling shooter	GPLv2	Freeware/CC BY 3.0 US	World Tree Games Productions / Epic MegaGames (Jason Emery, Daniel Cook)	The OpenTyrian team ported the closed-source Pascal code of Tyrian to C with permission of Jason Emery in February 2007. The graphic artist Daniel Cook released the artwork shortly after.
VGA Civil War Strategy Game	1995	2017	turn based strategy	MIT	MIT	W. R. Hutsell	In 2017 Mr. Hutsell gave the source code of VGA Civil War Strategy Game to Dave Mackey, who ported the game for modern platforms (Windows, Mac, Linux) with the help of SDL and other open-source libraries from QuickBASIC to QB64. The source code is released on GitHub under a MIT license.
Voxelquest	2014	2016	open world simulation	MIT	MIT	Gavan Woolery	After a successful crowdfunding project on Kickstarter to develop an open-world simulation game in 2014, Gavan Woolery developed several iterations of the game's engine. After running out of funding for further development, he open-sourced with support of the backers the game's engine on github.com under MIT license in August 2016.
Wander	1974	2015	Text adventure	public domain (?)	public domain (?)	Peter Langston	As of April 2015, the source code (long thought to be lost) of Wander, one of the earliest mainframe text adventures, could be acquired from the original author.
WaterRace	2000	2014	Racing game	GPLv2	GPLv2 (assets), CC BY-NC-SA 4.0 (music)	French Touch, SARL	In January 2014, Pierre-Olivier Latour, co-founder and CEO of French Touch, SARL, have uploaded the game's source code and assets on GitHub under the GPLv2 open-source license
Warfare Incorporated (now Hostile Takeover)	2003	2014	RTS	FreeBSD	BSD license	Spiffcode	In July 2014 the game's source code and content got open sourced with a BSD license under the name "Hostile Takeover" on GitHub. As result the game was ported by the game's community to alternative platforms like the Pandora handheld.
Warzone 2100	1999	2004/2008	RTS	GPL-2.0-or-later	GPL-2.0-or-later, CC	Pumpkin Studios/Eidos Interactive	3D real-time strategy game with a unit design system. First source part was released by Pumpkin Studios/Eidos Interactive in 2004 and the rest was released in 2008.
Word Whiz	1988	2009	Educational game	GPL-2.0-or-later	GPL-2.0-or-later	Apogee Software	Game source released on March 20, 2009.
Worms?	1983	2021	software toy	MIT	MIT	David S. Maynard	The source code for Worms?, one of the initial Electronic Arts releases, was uploaded to GitHub by Kay Savetz on March 17, 2021, under the MIT license with permission of Maynard.
Zork (also known as Dungeon or Dungeon Adventure)	1977	1978	Text adventure	Public domain software / MIT	Public domain	Robert M. Supnik / Infocom	Public domain software ports with source code based on the first "Dungeon" version of Zork, are available in various repositories. Also, Infocom allowed the distribution of the early Fortran version. Original version from MIT. On 20 November 2025, Microsoft released the source code for Zork, Zork II and Zork III under the MIT license.
ZZT	1991	2023	Action-adventure puzzle	MIT	no artwork	Potomac Computer Systems	Originally thought to be lost, a source code backup for ZZT 3.0 surfaced and a modified version of it with third-party content removed was uploaded to GitHub by Adrian Siekierka, developer of Reconstruction of ZZT, under the MIT license with permission of Tim Sweeney, creator of the game.

=== Open-source games with free of charge data ===
Only the game engines in this table are developed under an open-source license, which means that the reuse and modification of only the code is permitted. The assets are provided free of charge to the final user, but with some restrictions. Note that both the engine and the game code must be available under a license approved by the OSI and/or the FSF, if it was made with a licensed engine.

Title	First release	Source code release	Genre	Engine license	Content license	Original developer	Additional information
Allegiance (now FreeAllegiance)	2000	2004	real-time strategy and Space combat simulator	MIT (earlier Shared Source)	Freeware	Microsoft Research	Released by Microsoft Research under a shared source license ("MSR-SSLA") 2004. On July 27, 2017, Microsoft Research changed the license from MSR shared source license to MIT license.
Amulets & Armor	1997	2013	first person role-playing video game	GPL-3.0-only	Freeware	United Software Artists	In 2013 Amulets & Armor was re-released as freeware on the game's official site and the source code under GPL-3.0-only on GitHub. Work continues for ports to newer systems (Windows, MacOS) and general bug fixes.
Ares (now Antares)	1996	2008	Space Strategy video game	LGPLv3	CC BY-NC-SA/CC BY-NC-ND/Freeware	Nathan Lamont/Bigger Planet Software	Released in 2008. Under continued development for modern systems as "Antares" via GitHub.
Avara	1996	2016	Shooter game	MIT	Freeware	Ambrosia Software / Juri Munkki	The MacOS classic game became open source in 2016 when Munkki released the source code upon the game's 20th anniversary.
Buzz Aldrin's Race Into Space (now Race Into Space)	1993	2007	Simulation	GPLv2	Freeware	Strategic Visions/Fritz Bronner	A port of Buzz Aldrin's Race Into Space to modern operating systems. The license fell back to Bronner as he had a contract clause with Interplay stating that in case Interplay went bankrupt or no distribution happened for some time.
Cart Life	2011	2014	Simulation	Artistic-2.0/MIT-like (engine/game code)	Freeware	Richard Hofmeier	In March 2014 the game was removed from all digital distributions and the source code and game was made available for free online, with Hofmeier saying he was finished supporting the game. His webpage went later offline but the source code was mirrored on GitHub.
Corncob 3D	1993	2016	Flight simulator	Public domain software	Freeware	Pie in the Sky / Kevin Stokes	The game became around 2016 freeware and open source.
Dink Smallwood	1997	2003	Action RPG	Zlib inspired own license	Freeware	Robinson Technologies	Source code published on July 17, 2003, from Seth Robinson. 2008 Artwork published (without some sounds) under a Zlib license. In October 2017 the HD version became fully open source and freeware, too. The source code became available on GitHub shortly after.
Glider 4.0	1991	2016	Flight simulator	MIT	Freeware	John Calhoun	On January 26, 2016, the source code for Glider 4.0 was uploaded to GitHub.
Glider PRO	1994	2016	Flight simulator	GPL-2.0-only	Freeware	John Calhoun	On January 27, 2016, the source code, graphics, and sound data for Glider PRO were released on GitHub with the source code being licensed under the GNU General Public License v2.
Gloom	1995	2017	FPS	unlicense	"for historical purposes"	Black Magic	In January 2017 the assembly and BlitzBasic 2 source code of the Amiga Doom clone Gloom was released as public domain software under unlicense on GitHub. The assets were released "for historical and archiving purposes.".
Gunocide II	2000	2001	Galaga-like 2D shooter	GPLv2	Freeware	Alexander Bierbrauer and Oliver Weiler	Developed around 2000. After being succesless commercially published via a publisher, the game was released as freeware and under GPL. 2002 ported to Linux and hosted on SourceForge as "G2ex".
H-Craft Championship	2007	2015	science fiction racing game	zlib license	Freeware	Irrgheist	H-Craft Championship was developed by the independent game studio Irrgheist and released by Manifesto Games/Akella in 2007. In 2014, the developers released the game as freeware and the source code under the zlib license in February 2015.
Haunts: The Manse Macabre	2012	2012	turn based strategy	BSD-3-Clause	CC BY-NC-SA	Rick Dakan	The 2012 with $29,000 crowdfunded and in Go programmed game was put on GitHub after the money for further development run out. While a volunteer keeps updating the almost finished prototype, the against the Go 1.0 API build game fails to compile with newer compilers and Go versions.
Hypercycles	1995	2017	Shooter	GPL-3.0-only	Freeware	Bob Hays	Released in January 2017 on GitHub. As August 16, 2020, the repository was removed from GitHub. The code has been re-uploaded on GitHub
Infinity	2002	2016	RPG	GPL-3.0-or-later	CC BY-NC-ND 4.0 / CC BY-NC-SA 4.0	Affinix Software	Developed in 2002 as commercial Game Boy Color title (~90% finished) the game was never published. Infinity was released as non-commercial freeware with source code in August 2016, and after a successful Kickstarter campaign in August 2021, development was restarted by Incube8 Games.
Iron Seed	1994	2013	Space trading and combat simulator	GPLv3	Freeware	Channel 7	Released as freeware by the authors to promote the development of Iron Seed 2 in the 2000s. Source opened under the GPL by the developers in 2013.
Magic Land Island (now Pocket Island)	2011	2012	Casual game	MIT	CC BY-NC-SA	Wooga	Magic Land Island was launched during the GDC Europe in August 2011. In June 2012 the HTML5 game was open sourced under the name Pocket Island on GitHub under MIT license and with the assets under Creative Commons license CC BY-NC-SA.
Marathon 2: Durandal (now Aleph One)	1995	2000	FPS	GPLv2	Freeware	Bungie	Released by Bungie on January 17, 2000.
Marathon Infinity (now Aleph One)	1996	2011	FPS	GPL-3.0-or-later	CC BY-NC-SA 3.0	Bungie	Released by Bungie in 2011.
Meridian 59	1995	2012	MMORPG	GPL-2.0-only (excluding compression and audio libraries)	Freeware	Archetype Interactive	As of February 2010 Meridian 59 has been turned over to the original technical developers, Andrew and Chris Kirmse. On September 15, 2012, they released the game to the public as Freeware and most of the source code under the GPLv2 license.
The Pit Puzzle	1997	2011	Puzzle game	Apache-2.0	Freeware	Abe Pralle / Plasmaworks	The DOS game source code was released around 2011 by the author Abe Pralle under Apache 2.0 License on GitHub.
Postal	1997	2016	Top-down shooter	GPL-2.0-only	Freeware	Running with Scissors	In 2015 the Running with Scissors developers announced that they will release the source code of the game "if someone promises to port it to the Dreamcast." In June 2016 the developers gave the source code to a community developer who ported the game to Linux for the OpenPandora handheld. On December 28, 2016, the source code was released on Bitbucket under the GPLv2.
Project Starfighter	2001	2008	Shoot 'em up	GPLv2	Freeware	Parallel Realities	
Star Control II (now The Ur-Quan Masters)	1992	2002	Action RPG	GPLv2	CC BY-NC-SA 2.5	Toys for Bob (Fred Ford / Paul Reiche III)	Source code of the 3DO version GPL-released in 2002.
Star Ruler 2	2015	2018	Real-time strategy, 4X	MIT	CC BY-NC 2.0	Blind Mind Studios	Released on GitHub as an open-source project, including assets under the CC BY-NC (but not music) on July 22, 2018.
Starshatter: The Gathering Storm	2004	2011	Space combat simulator	New BSD License	Freeware	Destroyer Studios / Matrix Games	Source code released by Destroyer Studios/Matrix Games on December 14, 2011.
Strange Adventures in Infinite Space	2002	2005/2009	Space Roguelike	GPL-3.0-or-later	CC BY-NC 4.0	Digital Eel	Source was released under GPL by Digital Eel in 2005. Content became freeware 2009. License changed to GPLv3 and assets to CC BY-NC-4.0 on May 18, 2020.
Team 47 GoMan	1997	1998	Mech game	Public-domain software	Proprietary	47-TEK	Released artwork and source code to public in May 1998. As of March 2022, source code has been uploaded to GitHub.
Tread Marks	2000	2017	Tank Combat/Racing	GPL-3.0-or-later	Freeware	Longbow Digital Arts / Seumas McNally	Won in 2000 the Seumas McNally Grand Prize. On January 20, 2017 the source code was released as open source on github.com and the game itself as freeware. A port to Linux and MacOS is in progress. In September 2017 a version for the Linux-based OpenPandora was released.
Tribal Trouble	2005	2014	RTS	GPLv2	Freeware	Oddlabs	In September 2014 the game's source code was released to the public on GitHub and is now open source under the GPLv2. Development continues in a community fork.
Tribes 2	2001	2012	FPS	MIT/Proprietary (engine/game code)	Freeware	Dynamix	Many commercial titles were developed using the Torque engine. GarageGames released Torque 3D under the MIT License on September 20, 2012. The Tribes 2 source code beside the Torque engine is not available.

=== Open-source games without assets ===
Only the game engines in this table are developed under an open-source license, which means that the reuse and modification of only the code is permitted. The assets are not provided for free and must be bought by the final user. Note that both the engine and the game code must be available under a license approved by the OSI and/or the FSF, if it was made with a licensed engine.

Title	First release	Source code release	Genre	Engine license	Original developer	Additional information
Age of Pirates: Captain Blood	2010	2022	Action-adventure game / Hack and slash	GPL-3.0-or-later	1C: Seawolf Studio	Source code of game engine was released on GitHub under GPLv3 on November 28, 2022.
Age of Pirates 2: City of Abandoned Ships	2009	2021	Role-playing game	GPL-3.0-or-later	Akella	Source code of Storm Engine released on GitHub under GPLv3 in a 2021 and support Sea Dogs: To Each His Own and Age of Pirates 2: City of Abandoned Ships.
Amnesia: A Machine for Pigs	2013	2020	Survival horror	GPL-3.0-or-later	The Chinese Room	On September 23, 2020, Frictional Games released the source code for this game. Source code was released on GitHub under the GPLv3.
Amnesia: The Dark Descent	2010	2020	Survival horror	GPL-3.0-or-later	Frictional Games	On September 23, 2020, Frictional Games released the source code for this game on its 10th release anniversary. Source code was released on GitHub under the GPLv3.
Analogue: A Hate Story	2012	2013	Visual novel	MIT/Public-domain software—Proprietary (engine/game code)	Love Conquers All Games	Developed using the Ren'Py engine, the game code for Analogue: A Hate Story was released on May 4, 2013, under a public-domain-equivalent license. The source code release includes the entire script of the game for context, but the script remains proprietary.
Arx Fatalis (now Arx Libertatis)	2002	2011	RPG	GPL-3.0-or-later	Arkane Studios	The design of Arx Fatalis was heavily influenced by Ultima Underworld. Game source released by Arkane Studios on January 14, 2011. Based upon this source code the formed Arx Libertatis-project created Fan-made patches and Source ports.
Aquaria	2007	2010	Action-adventure	GPL-2.0-or-later	Bit Blot	Open sourced with Humble Indie Bundle.
Blake Stone: Planet Strike	1994	2013	FPS	GPL-2.0-or-later	Apogee Software	Released in 2013 to promote the sale of the Apogee Throwback Pack on Steam.
Brány Skeldalu	1998	2008–2025	Dungeon crawler role-playing video game	GPL-3.0-or-later (2008) / MIT (2025)	Napoleon Games	On 19 November 2007 the game was made freeware by Napoleon Games. On January 14, 2008, the source code was uploaded to SourceForge under the GPL-3.0-or-later license. On April 30, 2025, the game was commercially re-released on Steam; on May 20, 2025, the source code for this re-released version was released under the MIT license on GitHub.
Canabalt	2009	2010	Cinematic platformer	MIT/Proprietary (engine/original game code)	Adam Saltsman	Released by Adam Saltsman in 2010. On February 7, 2024, the full source code for an improved version of the original Canabalt ported to HaxeFlixel with support for Windows, macOS, Linux and HTML5 by Cameron Taylor (of Friday Night Funkin' fame) was released on GitHub under the same license, with authorization of Finji (the company founded by Adam Saltsman).
Catacomb	1989	2014	Top-down shooter	GPL-2.0-or-later	Flat Rock Software	Released by Flat Rock Software on June 5, 2014, on GitHub.
Catacomb 3D	1991	2014	FPS	GPL-2.0-or-later	Flat Rock Software / id Software	Released by Flat Rock Software on June 5, 2014, on GitHub.
The Colony	1988	2023	FPS	Apache-2.0	Dave Smith	Source code for the PC, Mac and Amiga versions released by Smith on GitHub on June 6, 2023, with the source code under the Apache License 2.0.
Command & Conquer	1995	2020	RTS	GPL-3.0-or-later	Westwood Studios	The games' code was released along with the Command & Conquer Remastered Collection in order to aid in the development of mods. It can be used to build mods for the remaster, but due to some missing bits that are substituted by the remaster's own (closed source) engine, it can not be used to directly re-build the original (unremastered) games from them. The original, full source code to both games was later released on February 27, 2025.
Command & Conquer: Red Alert	1996	2020	RTS	GPL-3.0-or-later	Westwood Studios	The games' code was released along with the Command & Conquer Remastered Collection in order to aid in the development of mods. It can be used to build mods for the remaster, but due to some missing bits that are substituted by the remaster's own (closed source) engine, it can not be used to directly re-build the original (unremastered) games from them. The original, full source code to both games was later released on February 27, 2025.
Command & Conquer: Generals – Zero Hour	2005	2025	RTS	GPL-3.0-or-later	EA Los Angeles	Released by Electronic Arts on February 27, 2025.
Command & Conquer: Renegade	2002	2025	First and third-person shooter	GPL-3.0-or-later	Westwood Studios	Released by Electronic Arts on February 27, 2025.
Commander Keen in Keen Dreams	1991	2014	Platformer	GPL-2.0-or-later	id Software	In September 2014, after an Indiegogo crowdfunding campaign, the game's source code was released on GitHub.
CoreBreach	2011	2012	Racing game	MIT/GPL-2.0-only (engine/game code)	CoreCode	Futuristic "anti-gravity" racing game with combat. Source was released after a sales quota was met.
Cortex Command	2012	2019	Action game	AGPL-3.0-only	Data Realms LLC	The indie game was in development since 2001, which won an IGF award in 2009, was finally released in 2012. In July 2019 the source code was released under AGPL-3.0-only on GitHub. As of 2026 the work on a community continuation, dubbed "Cortex Command Community Project", is ongoing.
Delver	2012	2018	First-person action roguelike dungeon crawl	Apache-2.0/zlib (engine/game code)	Priority Interrupt	Developed using the libGDX framework; on November 15, 2018, Chad Cuddigan released the source code under the GPLv2. Changed to a modified version of the zlib license on November 23, 2018, and changed to the regular zlib license on September 21, 2020.
Descent 3	1999	2024	FPS	GPL-3.0-or-later	Outrage Entertainment	On April 16, 2024, Kevin Bentley (one of the programmers of the game) released the source code for Descent 3 on GitHub, under authorization of Matt Toschlog, co-owner of the copyright holder of the game.
Doom (3DO)	1995	2014	FPS	MIT	Logicware	On November 30, 2014, the source code of the 3DO Interactive Multiplayer port of the game was released by Rebecca Heineman (sole developer of the port) under an MIT license, a different license than the Doom version for Linux, and the Atari Jaguar port.
Doom and Doom II: Hell on Earth (Linux)	1993/1994	1997/1999	FPS	GPL-2.0-or-later	Id Software	Game source released on December 23, 1997, placed under GPL-2.0-or-later on October 3, 1999.
Doom (SNES)	1995	2020	FPS	GPL-3.0-or-later	Sculptured Software	On July 14, 2020, Randy Linden uploaded the source code for his Super Nintendo Entertainment System conversion of Doom to GitHub.
Doom 3	2004	2011	FPS	GPL-3.0-or-later	Id Software	Game source released on November 22, 2011.
Doom 3: BFG Edition	2012	2012	FPS	GPL-3.0-or-later	Id Software	Source code released on November 26, 2012, on GitHub.
DROD series	1997	2000	Puzzle game	MPLv1.1	Webfoot / Erik Hermansen	After the author reacquired the rights to the game from the original publisher Webfoot, he released the source code of the game engines. The source code releases include DROD: King Dugan's Dungeon, DROD: Journey to Rooted Hold, DROD: The City Beneath, DROD: Gunthro and the Epic Blunder, DROD: The Second Sky, and DROD RPG: Tendry's Tale without its media assets.
Eldritch	2013	2014	FPS, roguelike	zlib License	Minor Key Games	In April 2014, the game's source code was released to the public under a permissive zlib license. Content still proprietary and game being sold.
Flotilla	2010	2020	3d tactic game	Ms-PL/zlib (engine/game code)	Blendo Games	Indie game developer Blendo games released the source code to Flotilla on its 10th release anniversary. The source code is Zlib licensed on GitHub, but assets are not included.
Gish	2004	2010	Action	GPL-2.0-or-later	Cryptic Sea	Source opened with Humble Indie Bundle by Wolfire Games.
Glypha III	1990s	2016	Arcade	MIT	John Calhoun	On January 27, 2016, the source code, graphics, and sound data for Glypha III were released on GitHub with the source code being licensed under the MIT License. Updated ports for MacOs and iPhone were created afterward. A cross-platform OpenGL based port was released around May 2018 on GitHub.
Good Robot	2016	2020	Multidirectional shooter	MIT	Pyrodactyl Games	On August 3, 2020, Arvind Raja Yadav from Pyrodactyl Games released the source code for three of their games (Unrest, Will Fight for Food and Good Robot) under the MIT License on GitHub.
Hammerfight	2009	2011	2D physic based combat game	zlib license	Konstantin Koshutin	For the third Humble Indie Bundle Ryan C. Gordon ported the underlying game engine, "Haaf's Game Engine", to Linux and Mac OS X, and released source code under the zlib license. Relish Games released the original version of HGE 1.8.1 for Windows/DirectX to GitHub under zlib license, too.
Heretic	1994	1999	FPS	GPL-2.0-only	Raven Software	Game source released on January 11, 1999, under a very restrictive license, relicensed to GPL on September 4, 2008. The ACC script compiler was not included in the GPL re-release.
Hexen: Beyond Heretic	1995	1999	FPS	GPL-2.0-only	Raven Software	Game source released on January 11, 1999, under a very restrictive license, relicensed to GPL on September 4, 2008. The ACC script compiler was not included in the GPL re-release.
Hexen II	1997	2000	FPS	GPL-2.0-only	Raven Software	Game source released on November 10, 2000.
Hovertank 3D	1991	2014	FPS	GPL-2.0-or-later	Flat Rock Software/id Software	Released by Flat Rock Software on June 5, 2014, on GitHub.
Lemma	2014	2014	Voxel FPS open world parcour	MIT	Evan Todd	Despite an unsuccessful crowdfunding campaign in 2014, Lemma was released commercially by the developer DRM-free and also on Steam. The source code is openly developed and available on GitHub under a MIT license.
Little Big Adventure and Little Big Adventure 2	1994/1997	2021	Action-adventure	GPL-2.0-only	Adeline Software International	Source code released on GitHub under the GPL-2.0-only license by 2.21, the current copyright holders.
Machines: Wired for War	1999	2020	Real-time strategy	GPL-3.0-or-later	Charybdis/Nightdive Studios	The game was released by the new rights holder Nightdive Studios in 2020. The source code is under GPLv3 on GitHub. The assets are available too from the original developer's webpage.
Monster RPG 2	2010	2012	JRPG	zlib License	Nooskewl	After a successful Indiegogo campaign, released by Nooskewl under a Public domain like license ("Give it Your Own License") on November 11, 2012. Later changed to zlib license, and the content sold again to be able to pay the server bills.
Myst Online: Uru Live	2007	2010	MMORPG	GPLv3	Cyan Worlds	"Myst Online: Uru Live" struggled to attract subscribers and was canceled after its first year. Cyan release the game as an open source game in 2010. The game data is released under CC BY-NC-SA 4.0
Natural Selection	2002	2014	FPS	GPLv2 (most code) / custom (external libraries)	Unknown Worlds Entertainment	In January 2014 Unknown Worlds released the source code for download on GitHub.
The Operative: No One Lives Forever	2000	2010	FPS	GPL	Monolith Productions	In 2001, Monolith Productions released a set of editing tools for No One Lives Forever that included the level editor and model editor used for development. The team also released the source code for NOLF (version 1.003 on Windows) that year to "support the fan base by offering the tools to create their own levels". It is available both as a download, as well as on the Game of the Year Edition CD-ROM. Years later around 2013 Lithtech source code became available on GitHub under GPL, and work for merging game code and engine started.
No One Lives Forever 2: A Spy in H.A.R.M.'s Way	2002	2011	FPS	GPLv2	Monolith Productions	Source code released by Monolith Productions/Sierra Entertainment as part of a modding toolkit.
Overgrowth	2017	2022	Action	Apache-2.0	Wolfire Games	On April 21, 2022, Wolfire Games released the source code to Overgrowth on GitHub under the Apache License 2.0.
Pararena 2	1992	2016	Action sport game	MIT	John Calhoun	On January 27, 2016, the source code was released on GitHub licensed under the MIT license.
Penumbra: Overture	2007	2009	Survival horror with FPS aspects	GPL-3.0-or-later	Frictional Games	Developed by Swedish developer Frictional Games, the game blends the genres of survival horror, first-person shooter, and adventure. Open sourced with Humble Indie Bundle.
Quake	1996	1999	FPS	GPL-2.0-or-later	Id Software	Game source released on December 21, 1999.
Quake II	1997	2001	FPS	GPL-2.0-or-later	Id Software	Game source released on December 22, 2001.
Quake III Arena	1999	2005	FPS	GPL-2.0-or-later	Id Software	Game source released on August 19, 2005.
Quake 4	2005	2021	FPS	GPL-2.0-or-later	Raven Software	Adapted to the GPL id Tech 4 source code from Doom 3 with some issues remaining.
Raptor: Call of the Shadows	1994	2023	Scrolling shooter	GPL-2.0-or-later	Cygnus Studios	DOS version source code released on October 1, 2023, on GitHub.
Red Dog: Superior Firepower	2000	2022	Shooter	MIT	Argonaut Games	Source code uploaded on GitHub on September 26, 2022, under the MIT license by Matt Godbolt (one of the three programmers of the game) under authorization of Jez San, founder of Argonaut Games.
Return to Castle Wolfenstein	2001	2010	FPS	GPL-3.0-or-later	Gray Matter Studios/Nerve Software	The source code for Return to Castle Wolfenstein and Enemy Territory was released under the GNU General Public License (GPL) on August 12, 2010.
Revenge of the Titans	2010	2011	Tower Defense, RTS	BSD-3-Clause	Puppy Games	Java based game. Source code was released by Puppy Games with the success of the second Humble Indie Bundle.
Rise of the Triad	1994	2002	FPS	GPL-2.0-or-later	Apogee Software/3D Realms	Game source released on December 20, 2002.
Serious Sam (Serious Engine)	2001	2016	FPS	GPL-2.0-only	Croteam	In March 2016, Croteam released Serious Engine v1.10 as free and open-source software on GitHub under the GNU General Public License.
Seven Kingdoms II	1999	2009	RTS	GPLv2	Enlight	Source code released in August, 2009.
Shogo: Mobile Armor Division	1998	1998	FPS	GPL	Monolith Productions	In 1998, SDK released the game logic for modders. The Lithtech engine was not included as source code. Around 2013, Lithtech's source code became available on GitHub under the GPL, and the work of merging the game logic and the engine started. As of the end of 2019, this reworked NOLF2/LithTech engine reached a buildable state under Windows, and the work continues.
Siege of Avalon	2000	2003	RPG	LGPL	Digital Tome	Source code released June 23, 2003. Later one of the original developers announced the preparation of a re-release of SOA, but nothing came out of it. In September 2017 a community developer managed to fix the dependencies of the Open source release, recompile the executable, fixing several bugs and introducing higher resolution support for the game.
Soul Ride	2000	2003	Snow board simulation/sport game	GPLv2	Slingshot Game Technology	On 20 Jan 2003 Soul Ride's game engine source code was released to allow ports to alternative OSes.
Spacebase DF-9	2013	2015	Space simulator	CPAL	Double Fine	After Double Fine ended the support of the controversy ridden and incomplete game on end of 2014, fans have been working to continue the game's development with the availability of the source code in May 2015 under the CPAL open-source license. First patch became available in October 2015.
Spear of Destiny	1992	1995	FPS	GPL-2.0-or-later	id Software	The source code of Wolfenstein 3D, which also covered Spear of Destiny, was released on July 21, 1995.
Spectromancer	2008	2020	Turn-based strategy	BSD-3-Clause/Proprietary (engine/game code)	Three Donkeys LLC/Apus Software	On March 4, 2020, Ivan Polyacov from Apus Software released the source code to the Apus Game Engine, the in-house game engine by Apus Software used for Spectromancer and Astral Heroes after reaching the $50 tier on his Patreon. The game code to Astral Towers was also released to patrons.
Speed Haste	1995	2012	racing video game	public domain like license	Javier Arevalo Baeza	In 2012 the game's developer Javier Arevalo Baeza released the Borland C source code (minus some commercial library part) for "you can do whatever you want with this code" on GitHub.
Star Wars Jedi Knight II: Jedi Outcast	2002	2013	First/Third-person shooter	GPL-2.0-only	Raven Software	Release of the source code by Raven Software and Activision coincided with the closing of LucasArts by Disney.
Star Wars Jedi Knight: Jedi Academy	2003	2013	First/Third-person shooter	GPL-2.0-only	Raven Software	Release of the source code by Raven Software and Activision coincided with the closing of LucasArts by Disney.
System Shock	1994	2018	FPS	GPL-3.0-or-later	Night Dive Studios	In April 2018 the Mac version's source code was released by Night Dive on GitHub, fulfilling a 2016 promise. After one month of development, a cross-platform source port, called "Shockolate", for modern compilers and platforms was released by community developer Chad Cuddigan.
To Heart 2	2004	2006	Visual novel	GPLv2	Aquaplus	Its source code was released by Aquaplus under the GNU General Public License on December 22, 2005, along with the source code for Arurū to Asobo!!, Tears to Tiara, and Kusari. This decision was made due to the inclusion of Xvid derived code; Xvid being distributed under the same license. The source code for all four games is distributed upon request in CD-R format. A copy of the original source code is hosted on GitHub, as also an continued engine project.
To the Moon	2011	2014	role-playing game	GPL-2.0-or-later	Freebird Games	To the Moon was developed using RPG Maker XP engine in 2011. In January 2014 To the Moon was also released for OS X and Linux with the Humble Bundle X. Edward Rudd ported the game with the GPLv2 RPG Maker XP game engine recreation MKXP, other ports followed later. Also a successor game by Freebird games, "A Bird Story", was ported to Linux under usage of MKXP.
Toki Tori 2+	2013	2021	puzzle platform game	GPL-2.0-only	Two Tribes	On December 17, 2021, Two Tribes released the source code to their in-house engine used for games like Toki Tori 2+ and Rive under the GPL-2.0-only license on GitHub.
Unrest	2014	2020	Role-playing video game	MIT	Pyrodactyl Games	On August 3, 2020, Arvind Raja Yadav from Pyrodactyl Games released the source code for three of their games (Unrest, Will Fight for Food and Good Robot) under the MIT License on GitHub.
Urban Chaos	1999	2017	Action-adventure game	MIT	Mucky Foot	In May 2017 Mucky Foot's Mike Diskett released the source code of Urban Chaos under the MIT license on GitHub.
Vangers	1998	2016	racing and role-playing genre	GPLv3	K-D Lab	In March 2016, Vangers source code was released under GPLv3 license. Data was not freed though, so one still needs data files from Steam or GOG.com released in order to run the game.
Perimeter	2005 (remaster in 2024)	2021	Real time strategy game	GPLv3	K-D Lab	
Wolfenstein 3D	1992	1995	FPS	GPL-2.0-or-later	id Software	The source code of Wolfenstein 3D, which also covered Spear of Destiny, was released on July 21, 1995.
Wolfenstein: Enemy Territory	2003	2010	FPS	GPL-3.0-or-later	Splash Damage/id Software	Game source released on August 12, 2010.
World in Conflict (server code)	2007	2017	Real time strategy game	GPL-2.0-or-later	Ubisoft	Game source released in 2017 by ubisoft after support ended in 2014.

=== Source-available games with free of charge data ===
Video games in this table are source-available, but are neither open-source software according to the OSI definition nor free software according to the Free Software Foundation. If the source code is given out without specified license or public domain waiver it has legally to be considered as still proprietary due to the Berne Convention. The assets are provided free of charge to the final user, but with some restrictions.

Title	First release	Source code release	Genre	Engine license	Content license	Original developer	Additional information
Agony	1992	2020	Shoot 'em up	non-commercial use	Freeware	Art & Magic	Around 2010, graphic artist Franck Sauer started to offer the game's binary files (ADF format) for free download on his personal webpage, making the game Freeware. On July 4, 2020, Yves Grolet (programmer of the game) uploaded all his Amiga development files (which included full source code for Agony) to WeTransfer.
Anacreon: Reconstruction 4021	1987	2004	4x game	no license given	Freeware	George Moromisato	Developed by George Moromisato in 1987. Around 2004 the source code of the DOS version 2.00 was released.
Beneath a Steel Sky	1994	2003	Point and click adventure	Beneath a Steel Sky Freeware License	Beneath a Steel Sky Freeware License	Revolution Software	The assembly language source code of the game was made available to the public and ScummVM in August 2003. The source code availability made it possible for the ScummVM project to support the game, which allows the game to be played on Windows, OS X, Linux, Windows CE and other compatible operating systems and platforms.
Beyond Castle Wolfenstein	1985	2005	Stealth game	no license given	Freeware	Silas Warner	The reconstructed source code and the ported game was released by Silas Warner's widow in 2005.
Beyond Protocol (now After Protocol)	2008	2011	persistent, space MMORTS	non-commercial public license	Freeware	Dark Sky Entertainment	Initial design of Beyond Protocol began in 1991. A scaled up beta program began on November 15, 2007, with an open-beta in 2008. When due to financial issues the game has been shut down, the source code was released on 4 May 2011 on SourceForge to the public. Based on this source code, community organized development continues until today as After Protocol.
Bob's Game	2004	2016	puzzle, action RPG	Proprietary	Freeware	Robert Pelloni	In August 2016 the source code of the game was released on GitHub under a non-commercial source available software license, to allow the community to contribute. The author claims that he wrote the game originally in C, switched then to Java, and later converted it with an automatic code converter to C++.
Carnivores 2	1999	2013	Simulation	Proprietary	Freeware	Action Forms	A version from 2013 is available on assembla. Around 2017 the source code was released via Moddb.
Crystal Mines	1989	2011	Arcade	Custom permissive license	Freeware	Ken Beckett / Color Dreams	In August 2011 Ken Beckett, the programmer of the NES game Crystal Mines, released the source code under a custom permissive license to the public. Artwork still proprietary but can be shared for non-commercial, personal use.
Digger	1983	2004	Arcade	Proprietary	Freeware	Windmill Software	The original source code became available in September 2004 "for historical interest" (together with source code of other Windmill Software games as Styx). There is also an earlier free software reverse engineered variant available by Andrew Jenner, called Digger Remastered, ported for many platforms.
Dungeons of Daggorath	1982	2001	3D Dungeon crawler	Freeware	Freeware	DynaMicro / Douglas J. Morgan	After years of no further distribution from the publisher Radio Shack of the game, the distribution rights fell back to the developers. Morgan released game around 2001 under a freeware like license to the public, also offering the source code. Following, the game's community has created ports for PC, Linux, RISC OS and PSP.
Enemy Nations	1997	2005 /2006	RTS	own non-commercial license	non-commercial Freeware	Windward Studios	Game source and artwork was released by Windward Studios under a non-commercial license around 2005/2006.
Fort Apocalypse	1982	2015	action	CC BY-NC-ND 2.5	CC BY-NC-ND 2.5	Steve Hales / Synapse Software	In 2007 the Atari 8-bit game was relicensed to a CC BY-NC-ND 2.5 by Steve Hales and released on IgorLabs. On April 23, 2015, Steve Hales released the assembler source code to Fort Apocalypse on GitHub, also under CC BY-NC-ND 2.5, for historical reasons.
Free Fall	1983	1999	Beat 'em up	?	Freeware	Ian Bell / Acornsoft	In 1999, developer Ian Bell released the video game's BBC Micro assembly source code on his website. Semi-serious he considers it the first ever Beat 'em up video game.
Flow	2006	2009	Life simulation	? (For educational purposes)	Freeware	Thatgamecompany / Jenova Chen	Around 2009 the flash source code was made available for educational purposes by the developers.
HoverRace	1996	2008	Racing	originally time limited license / later non-commercial GrokkSoft HoverRace SourceCode License.	Freeware	GrokkSoft	Was first published under a time-limited license. In 2008 re-newed with an infinite duration license.
In Pursuit of Greed	1996	2014	FPS	non-commercial use, "for educational and personal use only"	Freeware (non-commercial)	Mind Shear Software	Based on Softdisk Publishing's "Raven engine" which powered also ShadowCaster. The game was released (including the engine) later by the developer as non-commercial freeware in 2014.
Kiloblaster	1992	2008	Arcade	Own license	Freeware (with additional restriction)	Epic MegaGames	Allen Pilgrim declared the registered version freeware and released also the source code on August 4, 2008.
Kumquat & Cantaloupe	1996	2012	Maze	undefined	Freeware	Dave Schofield	The Amiga games Kumquat & Cantaloupe, originally released as shareware titles, were re-released as freeware with source code included by the author in November 2012.
Magus	1995	2014	Rogue-like	Proprietary	Freeware	Ronny Wester	Around 2014 archived on GitHub from other now offline sources. A SDL port is in progress. In 2000 Wester released also the Borland Pascal 7 source code of Cyberdogs (excluding some libraries he had licensed) on his website.
Roboforge	2001	2008	Multiplayer Strategy game	"RoboForge, Personal, Non-Commercial Use End User License"	Freeware	Liquid Edge	Announced the game in July, 2000 by Liquid Edge the game was released on May 23, 2001. From July 2008 RoboForge became an open-source project with the source code for the Java-based client and server under a non-commercial license and as freeware. The game's community continues development.
Rocky Racers	2002	2004	Racing game	Non-Commercial license	Freeware	Positech Games	Released around 2002 by Positech Games, the game's C++ source code was released in July 2004 to the public for free.
Savage: The Battle for Newerth	2003	2007	online Real-time strategy, FPS	no license/proprietary	Freeware	S2 Games	The game was turned freeware by S2 Games on September 1, 2006. In 2007 the source code became available to the game community, who now continues development. The game can be played on Windows, Mac OS X and Linux.
Sea Dragon	1982	2015	Scrolling shooter	?	Public-domain software	Adventure International	In 1995, Wayne Westmoreland (co-designer of the game) placed the original TRS-80 binaries for Sea Dragon in the public domain. On December 19, 2015, Kevin Savetz uploaded the source code for the Atari 8-bit version of Sea Dragon under no license to the Internet Archive with permission of Russ Wetmore, developer of the port.
Stellar Conquest III: Hostile Takeover	1994	2006	Stellar Conquest inspired Space simulation	open source freeware (non-commercial)	Freeware (non-commercial redistribution allowed)	NecroBones / Ed T. Toton III	The Turbo Pascal 6 source code for the VGA DOS game was released in February 2006 together with the game itself as freeware by the developer.
Stellar Frontier	1997	2008	Space simulation	STARDOCK SHARED SOURCE STELLAR FRONTIER LICENSE (non-commercial license)	STARDOCK SHARED SOURCE STELLAR FRONTIER LICENSE (non-commercial license)	Stardock	Stellar Frontier was developed by Doug Hendrix in 1995 and was later licensed and published by Stardock. On August 4, 2006, Stardock Systems closed the official master server. On November 18, 2008, the game source code was released under an own non-commercial license. As result, the game's community took over the support of the game and improved the game, fixed the bugs and security holes with self-made patches.
Treasures of a Slaver's Kingdom	2007	2010	Z-machine Text adventure game	Freeware	Freeware	Cumberland Games & Diversions	S. John Ross released the commercial Treasures of a Slaver's Kingdom, which won the XYZZY Award 2007 for the best NPC, in 2010 with Z-machine source code as freeware. More source code of text adventure from the 1970s and 1980s are available at the archive.
Team Fortress 2	2007	2025	First-person shooter	Custom license	Freeware	Valve	Source code released as part of the Source SDK on February 18, 2025. Previously, a 2008 version of the game's source code was leaked alongside several other Orange Box games in 2012, and later a 2017 build of the game was leaked in 2020.
World Train Royale	2009	2011	Tycoon game	?	Freeware	Versus Software	Sold around 2009 for 10 dollars, the game source code was released on 26 June 2011 on SourceForge.
Xargon	1993	2008	Platformer	own license	Freeware (with additional restrictions)	Epic MegaGames	Game source released in 2008 by the programmer Allen Pilgrim. A SDL port followed later by Malvineous.
Prime World	2014	2024	MOBA	non-commercial use	non-commercial use	Nival	The original game was very donation-base. The official game server was closed in 2021. Sergey Orlovsky released repo with source code and data - excluding parts about commercial functions
Blitzkrieg 2	2005	2025	RTT	non-commercial use	non-commercial use	Nival	
Blitzkrieg	2003	2025	RTT	non-commercial use	non-commercial use	Nival	
Silent Storm	2003	2026	Turn-based tactics	non-commercial use	non-commercial use	Nival	

=== Source-available games ===
Video games in this table are source-available, but are neither open-source software according to the OSI definition nor free software according to the Free Software Foundation. If the source code is given out without specified license or public domain waiver it has legally to be considered as still proprietary due to the Berne Convention. The assets are not provided for free.

Title	First release	Source code release	Genre	Engine license	Content license	Original developer	Additional information
3-D Ultra Pinball: Thrill Ride	2000	2020	Pinball	Proprietary	Proprietary	Left Field Productions	On May 13, 2020, Dave Ashley added the source code of the Game Boy Color port to his Game Boy Color development repository.
Airline Tycoon	1998	2015	Simulation game	Proprietary	Commercial	Spellbound Entertainment	On 24 March 2015 Airline Tycoon Deluxe was re-released on the digital distribution platform gog.com, including the source code.
Alien 3	1992	2019	Run and gun	Proprietary	Proprietary	Probe Software	On May 19, 2019, Michael J. Archer uploaded the source code for the Commodore 64 version of the game to GitHub.
Alien Breed 3D II: The Killing Grounds	1996	1997	FPS	?	Proprietary	Team17	In March 1997 Team17 made the source code of Alien Breed 3D and Alien Breed 3D II freely available on the cover CD of Amiga Format magazine issue 95.
Alien vs Predator (Atari Jaguar game)	1994	2008	FPS	?	Proprietary	Rebellion Developments	Released by defunct Jaguar Sector II website under a CD compilation for PC titled Jaguar Source Code Collection on August 24, 2008. Source code was provided by Atari historian Curt Vendel.
Aliens versus Predator	2000	2001	FPS	Own non-commercial license	Proprietary	Rebellion Developments	Source code released by Rebellion Developments 2001. An unofficial patch project for the PC version, based on the source code, was released and is still updated.
Alpha Waves	1990	2009	early 3D exploration game with platform aspects	?	?	Christophe de Dinechin	Released in 1990 as one of the earliest 3D games with full 6-axis degree of freedom. In 2009, author Christophe de Dinechin released the complete assembly and GFA BASIC source code of the Atari ST version. There is also a started PC port in C++ on SourceForge by the original author.
Altered Beast	1989	2019	Beat 'em up	Proprietary	Proprietary	Software Studios	On May 19, 2019, Michael J. Archer uploaded the source code for the Commodore 64 conversion of the game to GitHub.
Anachronox	2001	2001 (partly)	RPG	Proprietary	Proprietary	Ion Storm	Some bits of code distributed with the official editor.
Anodyne	2013	2020	Action-adventure	Anodyne License	Anodyne License	Analgesic Productions	On April 4, 2020, Melos Han-Tani from Analgesic Productions released the source code of Anodyne under a custom permissive license.
Army Men III	2013	2018	Third-person shooter	Non-commercial use	Freeware	Neotl Empire	Army Men III was released in early access in 2013 and under development until its cancellation in 2016. Two years later, the unfinished game was released as open source on SourceForge in April 2018.
Atomic Robo-Kid	1990	2019	Scrolling shooter	Proprietary	Proprietary	Activision	On May 19, 2019, Michael J. Archer uploaded the source code for the Commodore 64 conversion of the game to GitHub.
Attack of the Mutant Camels	1989	2012	Scrolling shooters	?	?	Jeff Minter	In 2012 the assembly language source code of the Konix version of the game was released on GitHub.
Aztaka	2009	2011	Action role-playing game		Proprietary	Citérémis	In 2011 Independent game developer Citérémis released a "Developer's Edition" of Aztaka for $9.99 which included also the source code of the game.
Balance of Power	1985	2013	Government simulation game	?	?	Chris Crawford	In August 2013 Chris Crawford released source code of several of his games from his career to the public, fulfilling a GDC 2011 given promise. Beside Balance of Power he released all the source code he could recover, for instance Trust & Betrayal: The Legacy of Siboot, Excalibur, Gossip, Eastern Front (1941), Scram and Legionnaire.
Batman Returns	1993	2015	sidescrolling Beat 'em up	for educational purposes	for educational purposes	ACME / Chris Shrigley	In March 2015 programmer Chris Shrigley, who worked on the Sega CD version, found the Batman Returns source code and released it for educational purposes to the public. He released also the source code of Magician, Cliffhanger, Gargoyles and some other games from his working career.
Disney's Beauty and the Beast: A Board Game Adventure	1999	2020	Board	Proprietary	Proprietary	Left Field Productions	On May 13, 2020, Dave Ashley added the source code of the game to his Game Boy Color development repository.
Blood II: The Chosen	1998	1999	FPS	Proprietary	Proprietary	Monolith Productions	In 1999, SDK released the game logic for modders. The LithTech engine was not included as source code.
Blue Max	1983	2016	Scrolling shooter	Proprietary	Proprietary	Bob Pollin	Assembly source code released in 2016 by the author Bob Pollin in the Atariage forum. On the Atariage forum source code of many more games was released.
Breakout 2000	1996	2008	Action	Proprietary	Proprietary	MP Games	Released by defunct Jaguar Sector II website under a CD compilation for PC titled Jaguar Source Code Collection on August 24, 2008. Source code was provided by Atari historian Curt Vendel.
Broken Sword: The Shadow of the Templars and II: The Smoking Mirror	1996/1997	2003	Point and click adventure	Proprietary	Proprietary	Revolution Software	The source code of the games was made available to ScummVM in 2003.
Call to Power II	2000	2003	turn-based strategy game	Non-commercial own license	Proprietary	Activision	Civilization clone. Source opened to the apolyton community to allow support with Community patches.
Checkered Flag	1994	2008	Racing	Proprietary	Proprietary	Rebellion Developments	Released by defunct Jaguar Sector II website under a CD compilation for PC titled Jaguar Source Code Collection on August 24, 2008. Source code was provided by Atari historian Curt Vendel.
Civilization IV	2005	2006 (partly)	turn-based strategy	Proprietary	Proprietary	Firaxis Games / 2K Games	In April 2006 the developers released the source code of the core game mechanic to the public with a Software Development Kit. Additionally to the released source code, as game data and rules are stored in XML files and most of the game is written in Python, much (but not all) of the game is "open" and easily customizable. The game's community produced later many mods, total conversions and optimization patches for the game.
Civilization V	2010	2012 (partly)	turn-based strategy	Proprietary	Proprietary	Firaxis Games / 2K Games	In Fall 2012 the developers released the source code of the core game DLL. The game's community produced later a community patch project.
Club Drive	1994	2008	Racing	Proprietary	Proprietary	Atari Corporation	Released by defunct Jaguar Sector II website under a CD compilation for PC titled Jaguar Source Code Collection on August 24, 2008. Source code was provided by Atari historian Curt Vendel.
Contract J.A.C.K.	2003	2003	FPS	Proprietary	Proprietary	Monolith Productions	Game code distributed with the official editor (www.mpgh.net).
Conquest: Frontier Wars	2001	2013	Space Real-time strategy	Proprietary	Proprietary	Fever Pitch Studios	On December 9, 2013, the source code was bundled with every copy of the game purchased on GOG.com.
Cook, Serve, Delicious!	2012	2016	Business simulation game	Proprietary	Proprietary	Vertigo Gaming	Source code released in the Humble GameMaker Bundle on September 6, 2016.
Crazee Rider	1987	2019	Racing	Proprietary	Proprietary	Superior Software	In November 2018 the source code of Crazee Rider in BBC Micro 6502 assembly language was released by Kevin Edwards, designer of the game. In April of the following year the source code for the Acorn Electron version was also released.
CryEngine 5	2002	2016	FPS	?	NA	Crytek	In 2016 Crytek released their engine as pay-what-you-want including the source code to the public.
Crysis	2007	?	FPS	Proprietary	Proprietary	Crytek	Game code was officially released with the SDK.
Crysis 2	2011	?	FPS	Proprietary	Proprietary	Crytek	Game code was officially released with the SDK.
Cybermorph	1993	2008	Shooter	Proprietary	Proprietary	Attention to Detail	Released by defunct Jaguar Sector II website under a CD compilation for PC titled Jaguar Source Code Collection on August 24, 2008. Source code was provided by Atari historian Curt Vendel.
Daikatana	2000	2015	FPS	?	Proprietary	Ion Storm / John Romero	Lacking any further official support after the closure of Ion Storm's Dallas office in 2001, John Romero gave the game's source code to community members, allowing them to develop additional platform ports and bug fixes.
DarkSpace	2001	2009	MMO, Real-time strategy	multiple, self-written licenses.	Proprietary	Palestar	DarkSpace's game engine called Medusa released by Palestar under multiple licenses.
Death and Taxes	2020	2020	Simulation game	Proprietary/MIT (engine/game code)	Proprietary	Placeholder Gameworks	After selling well the indie game's Unity source code was released on GitHub to help other developers.
Death Ray Manta	2012	2015	Arena shooter	Proprietary	educational purposes	Bagfull of Wrong / Rob Fearon	The GameMaker Studio based game's source code was released in 2015 with a Humble Indie Bundle. The assets followed in 2016.
Descent, Descent II	1995/1996	1997/1999	space 3D FPS	own license	Proprietary	Parallax Software	Game source released by Parallax Software in 1997 (Descent 1) and 1999 (Descent 2). Descent 3 source code seems to be in hands of Rebecca Heineman and were considered 2014 for a release.
Deus Ex (video game)	2000	?	FPS	Proprietary	Proprietary	Ion Storm	Headers and some code distributed with the official SDK.
Discworld and Discworld II	1995	2008	point-and-click adventure game	Proprietary	Proprietary	Teeny Weeny Games	First announced for release around 2005 by Terry Pratchett, source code became in 2008 available to the ScummVM developers. The code was fast integrated into ScummVM.
Disney's Aladdin	1993	2017	Platformer	Proprietary	Proprietary	Disney	Around 2017 the source code of the game became available to "The Video game history foundation", which wrote a review of the technique of the game based on the code.
Dog Daze	1981	2014	Arcade game	Proprietary	Proprietary	Gray Chang	In 2014 Gray Chang released the source code of his Atari 8-bit games Dog Daze, Dog Daze Deluxe, Bumpomov's Dogs, and Claim Jumper. Available at the Internet Archive.
Doom (Jaguar)	1994	2003	FPS	Proprietary	Proprietary	Id Software	On April 27, 2003, the source code of the Atari Jaguar port of the game was released by Albert Yarusso of AtariAge with permission of John Carmack.
Duke Nukem 3D	1996	2003	FPS	Build license/GPLv2+ (engine/game code)	Proprietary	3D Realms / Ken Silverman	Game source released on April 1, 2003. Update builds and source ports like eduke32 followed by the game's community.
Dungeon Defenders	2010	2011	Tower defense	Proprietary	Proprietary	Trendy Entertainment	In November 2011 there was a "development kit" released as free DLC which included the game's source code.
Elite	1984	1999	Space trading game	Proprietary	Freeware	Ian Bell, David Braben	In November 1999, developer Ian Bell released on the game's 15th birthday the BBC Micro assembly source code on his website. Following that, Christian Pinder created a platform-neutral C version from the released BBC Micro version, called Elite: The New Kind (E-TNK; sources were removed in 2003 on David Braben request). In 1999–2000 a dispute occurred between Ian Bell and David Braben regarding Bell's decision to make available all versions of the original Elite. The dispute has since ended and the various versions are now available again on Bell's site.
Enemy Engaged: RAH-66 Comanche vs. KA-52 Hokum	2000	2003	Helicopter Flight simulator	own license	Proprietary	Razorworks	Game source was released somewhen 2003 by Razorworks.
Even the Ocean	2016	2023	action-adventure	Proprietary	Proprietary	Analgesic Productions	The entire source code for the game was uploaded under proprietary terms on GitHub on September 23, 2023.
Escape from Monster Manor	1993	2022	FPS	Proprietary	Proprietary	Studio 3DO	On August 8, 2022, Leo Schwab (programmer of the game) uploaded the entire source code for the game on GitHub. A port for Windows and Linux was released on March 31, 2026.
Faery Tale Adventure II: Halls of the Dead	1997	2021	Point and click adventure	Proprietary	Proprietary	The Dreamers Guild	The Wyrmkeep Entertainment provided the original source code to the ScummVM team in May 2021.
Far Cry (video game)	2004	?	FPS	Proprietary	Proprietary	Crytek	Game code was officially released with the SDK.
F.E.A.R.	2005	?	FPS	Proprietary	Proprietary	Monolith Productions	Headers and some code distributed with the official SDK.
The Feeble Files	1997	2005	Adventure	Proprietary	Proprietary	Adventure Soft	The source code of the games was made available to ScummVM in 2005.
Fight for Life	1996	2008	Fighting	Proprietary	Proprietary	Atari Corporation	Released by defunct Jaguar Sector II website under a CD compilation for PC titled Jaguar Source Code Collection on August 24, 2008. Source code was provided by Atari historian Curt Vendel.
Flight of the Amazon Queen	1995	2003	Adventure	Proprietary	Proprietary	Interactive Binary Illusions	The source code of the games was made available to ScummVM in 2004.
Freedom Force	2002	2002 (partly)	FPS	Proprietary	Proprietary	Irrational Games	Game logic written in Python. Scripts are located in the game directory.
FreeSpace 2 (now FreeSpace 2 Source Code Project)	1999	2002	Space Sim	Non-commercial/Proprietary	Proprietary	Volition	Game source released by Volition on April 25, 2002.
Galaforce	1986	2019	Shoot 'em up	Proprietary	Proprietary	Superior Software	In March 2019 the source code of Galaforce in BBC Micro 6502 assembly language was released by Kevin Edwards, designer of the game. In April of the same year Edwards released the source code for the Acorn Electron version.
Gothic 3	2006	2007	RPG	Proprietary	Proprietary	JoWood	Source code was opened by JoWood for the members of "Community patch project" from the game community in 2007.
Grand Monster Slam	1989	2017	Fantasy sports game	?	Proprietary	Rolf Lakaemper, Hartwig Niedergassel	In March 2017 the source code of the game became available via the Internet Archive.
Hack 'n' Slash	2014	2014	Zelda-like puzzle game	?	Proprietary	Double Fine	With the 1.0 release on September 9, 2014, the source code of the game was also released by Double Fine.
Hacker Evolution: Source code	2007	2015	Hacker game	?	Proprietary	Exosyphen	Released on May 11, 2015, for $49.95 by the indie game developer.
Heartlight	1990	2005	Action-adventure	?	?	X LanD Computer Games / Janusz Pelc	The 8-bit Atari source code became available around 2005. Other games like Robbo became available too.
Heavy Metal: F.A.K.K. 2	2000	2001	Action-adventure	Proprietary	Proprietary	Ritual Entertainment	Game code distributed with the official editing tools / SDK.
Heretic II	1998	1998	Action-adventure	Proprietary	Proprietary	Raven Software	Game code distributed with the official editing tools.
Highlander: The Last of the MacLeods	1995	2008	Action-adventure	Proprietary	Proprietary	Lore Design Limited	Released by defunct Jaguar Sector II website under a CD compilation for PC titled Jaguar Source Code Collection on August 24, 2008. Source code was provided by Atari historian Curt Vendel.
Homeworld	1999	2003	Space Real-time strategy	Non-commercial license	Proprietary	Relic Entertainment	Game source released 2003. The source code became the base of several source ports to alternative platforms, like Mac, Linux, Pandora, Maemo/N900, or Android using the Simple DirectMedia Layer (SDL) cross-platform multimedia library. As the source code's license requirements limits further development significantly the game's community aims for a re-licensing with the new IP holder Gearbox. In September 2013 Gearbox responded positively to the idea for a re-licensing of the already published source code, noting their efforts in supporting the modding community.
Hover Strike	1995	2017	Shooter	Proprietary	Proprietary	Atari Corporation	Made freely available on a Jaguar-dedicated Facebook group in May 2017.
Hover Strike: Unconquered Lands	1995	2008	Shooter	Proprietary	Proprietary	Atari Corporation	Released by defunct Jaguar Sector II website under a CD compilation for PC titled Jaguar Source Code Collection on August 24, 2008. Source code was provided by Atari historian Curt Vendel.
Hundreds	2010	2010	Puzzle game	?	?	Greg Wohlwend / Semi Secret	Greg Wohlwend chose to open source his code in 2010, partly with the intent to spur "non-coders" to try coding, as he had. Programmer Eric Johnson of Semi Secret found the open source version and ported the game to iPad in a weekend before notifying Wohlwend, which was later released commercially in an updated version.
I-War (Atari Jaguar game)	1995	2008	Shooter	Proprietary	Proprietary	Imagitec Design	Released by defunct Jaguar Sector II website under a CD compilation for PC titled Jaguar Source Code Collection on August 24, 2008. Source code was provided by Atari historian Curt Vendel.
Inherit the Earth	1994	2005	Point and click adventure	Proprietary	Proprietary	The Dreamers Guild	In 2005, Wyrmkeep Entertainment gave the source code for the game to the ScummVM Team for its inclusion in ScummVM.
Jim Power in Mutant Planet	1992	2017	Platform game	?	?	Digital Concept	Around 2017 the source code of Jim Power was rescued by Piko Interactive.
Ken's Labyrinth	1993	2001	FPS	Non-commercial license	Freeware	Ken Silverman	Ken's Labyrinth was released as freeware on November 16, 1999. The source code under a non-commercial license followed on July 1, 2001. A port to modern operating systems such as Windows and Linux using Simple DirectMedia Layer called LAB3D/SDL was created by Jan Lönnberg and released in 2002. A version of the port which includes new higher resolution textures was also created by Jared Stafford.
Kingpin: Life of Crime	1999	?	FPS	Proprietary	Proprietary	Xatrix Entertainment	Game code distributed with the official SDK.
The Labyrinth of Time	1993	2016	Adventure	Proprietary	Proprietary	Terra Nova Development	The source code of the games was made available to ScummVM in 2016.
Larva Mortus	2008	2009	Top-down shooter	MIT/Non-commercial (engine/game code)	Proprietary	Rake in Grass	Czech independent video game developer Pavel Tovarys released the Torque 2D v1.1.3 based source code in 2009 under non-commercial conditions. Several other games' source code were released too. The code was taken offline after several games' IP were sold to another company. The source code is currently in no known repository on the web available.
The Little Mermaid II: Pinball Frenzy	2000	2020	Pinball	Proprietary	Proprietary	Left Field Productions	On May 11, 2020, Dave Ashley released the source code of the game on GitHub, along with a Game Boy Color emulator.
The Lost Files of Sherlock Holmes: The Case of the Serrated Scalpel and The Case of the Rose Tattoo	1992	2015	Adventure	Proprietary	Proprietary	Mythos Software	On 2015 Electronic Arts gave source code for both games to the ScummVM Team for their inclusion in ScummVM.
MechCommander 2	2001	2006	Real-time tactics	Shared Source Limited Permissive License	Proprietary	FASA Interactive/Microsoft	Source opened under a Shared Source license by Microsoft in August 2006. As of 2017 there is a project fork on GitHub with the goal to port the source code to Linux.
Miner Wars 2081	2012	2013	6DOF Space Shooter game	own proprietary license	Proprietary	Keen Software House	6DOF action-survival space-shooter simulation-game set in the year 2081. Full game and engine source code released under a restrictive license.
MiG Alley	1999	2001	Flight simulation	Proprietary	Proprietary	Rowan Software/Empire Interactive	Source opened by Rowan Software/Empire Interactive in 2001.
MoonBase Commander	2002	2024	turn-based strategy	Proprietary	Proprietary	Humongous Entertainment	The source code of the game was made available to the ScummVM developers in 2024.
Mr. Do! (for Game Boy)	1992	2007	Arcade	Proprietary	Proprietary	Universal Entertainment Corporation	Game Boy version open sourced by developer Wesley Knackers in 2007 on his website.
Myth (series)	1998	2001	Real-time tactics	Proprietary	Proprietary	Take 2 Interactive/MumboJumbo	Source opened by Take 2 Interactive/MumboJumbo to the game community in 2001.
Nanosaur	1998	2003	FPS	Proprietary	Proprietary	Pangea Software	Around 2003 the Nanosaur source code was made available by the developer under a restrictive license.
Nemesis the Warlock	1987	2019	Action game	Proprietary	Proprietary	Creative Reality	On May 19, 2019, Michael J. Archer uploaded the source code for the Commodore 64 version of the game to GitHub.
Nightlong: Union City Conspiracy	1998	2021	Adventure	Proprietary	Proprietary	Trecision	On May 29, 2021, the ScummVM Team received the source code for the in-house game engine created by Trecision, and used for games like Nightlong: Union City Conspiracy, Ark of Time, and Alien Virus.
Pariah	2005	2005 (partly)	FPS	Proprietary	Proprietary	Digital Extremes	Game code available on GitHub.
Pirate Adventure	1978	1980	adventure game	?	?	Scott Adams (game designer)	The source code for Pirate Adventure was printed in the December 1980 issue of BYTE, with an addendum in April 1981. This enabled others to discover how the engine worked and to create their own adventures using this or a similar design.
Postal 2	2003	2003 (partly?)	FPS	Proprietary	Proprietary	Running with Scissors	Some game code and tools distributed with the official game release.
Preppie!	1982	2016	action game	?	?	Russ Wetmore / Star Systems Software	In January 2016 Russ Wetmore released the source code of his Atari 8-bit games Preppie! and Preppie II to the public on the Internet Archive.
Prince of Persia	1989	2012	Cinematic platformer	Proprietary	Proprietary	Jordan Mechner	Apple II source code was long-thought-lost, but was found again and released in 2012. A port of the assembly source code to C and SDL as backend was made by a community programmer.
Rampage	1988	2019	Action game	Proprietary	Proprietary	Software Studios, Catalyst Coders	On May 19, 2019, Michael J. Archer uploaded the source code for the Commodore 64 conversion of the game to GitHub.
Rogue Legacy	2013	2024	Roguelike	source available	Proprietary	Cellar Door Games	Cellar Door Games released the game's source code "in the pursuit of sharing knowledge". The source code was released on GitHub with a license inspired by the VVVVVV Source Code License.
Rowan's Battle of Britain	2000	2001	Flight simulation	Empire Interactive License	Proprietary	Rowan Software/Empire Interactive	Source opened by Rowan Software/Empire Interactive in 2001.
Rune	1999	2000	FPS	Proprietary	Proprietary	Human Head Studios	Headers and some code distributed with the official SDK.
Savant - Ascent	2013	2015	Action	Proprietary	Proprietary	D-Pad Studio	Source code released in the Humble Weekly Bundle: Play and Create with GameMaker on September 17, 2015.
Sea Dogs: An Epic Adventure at Sea	2000	2009	pirate game	Proprietary	Proprietary	Akella	In 2009 Akella agreed to hand the source code of Sea Dogs' game engine to the game community on end-of-support.
Severance: Blade of Darkness	2001	2001 (partly)	FPS	Proprietary	Proprietary	Rebel Act Studios	Game logic written in Python. Scripts are located in the game directory.
Shadowgun: Deadzone	2011	2015	Shoot 'em up	SHADOWGUN: DEADZONE PUBLIC LICENSE AGREEMENT	Proprietary	Madfinger Games	Game source and assets of the Unity 3.5 game were released some years after release.
Shadowgrounds	2005	2011	Shoot 'em up	own non-commercial license	Proprietary	Frozenbyte	Game source released with a Humble Indie Bundle by Frozenbyte on April 22, 2011.
Shadow Warrior	1997	2005	FPS	Build license/GPLv2+ (engine/game code)	Proprietary	3D Realms	Game source released on April 1, 2005.
Silent Hunter II	2001	2002	submarine simulation	?	Proprietary	Ubisoft	Around 2002 Ubisoft had ended the official support while still significant issues existed. Therefore, Ubisoft enabled the game's community at Subsim.com to fix the game themselves by giving them the source code. The fans raised $7000 for an unofficial patch development project which fixed most of the issues. The community extended Silent Hunter II also content wise significantly with expansion packs or texture upgrades.
Sin & Sin Mission Pack: Wages of Sin	1998	1998	FPS	Proprietary	Proprietary	Ritual Entertainment	Game code was officially released.
Sláine	1987	2019	Adventure	Proprietary	Proprietary	Creative Reality	On May 19, 2019, Michael J. Archer uploaded the source code for the Commodore 64 version of the game to GitHub.
Soliter	1994	2009	Puzzle game	Proprietary	Freeware	Oldsoft	Zdnek Stary developed at the Czech development studio Oldsoft the solitair game Soliter for the ZX Spectrum which got released in 1994. The game was released by the author in 2005 on his homepage for download, in 2009 the assembly source code followed as scan.
Soldier of Fortune	2000	?	FPS	Proprietary	Proprietary	Raven Software	Game code distributed with the official SDK.
Soldier of Fortune II: Double Helix	2002	?	FPS	Proprietary	Proprietary	Raven Software	Game code distributed with the official SDK.
Solstice	2016	2016	Visual novel	Proprietary	Proprietary	MoaCube	Source code released in the Humble GameMaker Bundle on September 6, 2016.
The Space Bar	1997	2024	Point and click adventure	Proprietary	Proprietary	Boffo Games	The source code of the game was made available to the ScummVM developers in 2024.
Space Engineers	2013	2015	space sandbox game	Proprietary	Proprietary	Keen Software House	On May 14, 2015, the development studio made the source code freely available to the game's community for easier modding on GitHub under a proprietary license (non-open source license).
Star Fighter	1995	2024	Space simulator	Proprietary	Proprietary	Krisalis Software	On April 25, 2024, 3DO homebrew developer Trapexit released the source code with assets included for the 3DO port of Star Fighter under no license on GitHub, after obtaining it from Nathan Atkinson, who got permission from Andrew Hutchings, co-creator of the game and this port, to release it.
Star Fire	1980	2020	Arcade	Proprietary	Proprietary	Exidy	On August 21, 2020, The History of How We Play uploaded to the Internet Archive the source code for Star Fire provided by David Rolfe, co-designer of the game.
Star Raiders	1979	2015	space combat simulator	Proprietary	Proprietary	Aric Wilmunder / Atari	The commented assembly source code scan of Star Raiders became available in October 2015 in the Internet Archive as scan. Aric Wilmunder opened it up with several other artifacts of his gaming career (e.g. SCUMM). The community typed in the source code double checked in a GitHub project. Shortly before a reverse engineering project was finished, too. A true sequel, also called Star Raiders II, had been under development for some time by Aric Wilmunder. The never released prototype source code was posted publicly in December 2015.
Star Trek: Voyager – Elite Force	2000	2000	FPS	Proprietary	Proprietary	Raven Software	Game code distributed with the official GDK. Holomatch multiplayer independently ported to ioquake3.
Star Trek: Elite Force II	2002	2003	FPS	Proprietary	Proprietary	Ritual Entertainment	In November 2003 Ritual Entertainment released the source code of their server-side code base for multiplayer gaming under a non-commercial license.
Stealth Bastard Deluxe	2012	2015	Stealth	Proprietary	Proprietary	Curve Digital	Source code released in the Humble Weekly Bundle: Play and Create with GameMaker on September 17, 2015.
Taxman	1981	202?	Pac-Man clone	?	?	H.A.L. Labs / Brian Fitzgerald	Apple II Pac-Man clone from 1981. In August 2015 Rebecca Heineman announced that original developer Brian Fitzgerald allowed to release the source code. GitHub repository is still empty as of July 2020.
Tempest 2000 (Atari Jaguar)	1994	2008	Tube shooter	?	Proprietary	Llamasoft	Released by defunct Jaguar Sector II website under a CD compilation for PC titled Jaguar Source Code Collection on August 24, 2008. Source code was provided by Atari historian Curt Vendel.
Terminal Velocity	1995	2015	flight game	?	?	Mark Randel / Terminal Reality	Became available under a NDA in June 2015. Work on an updated version for modern system started immediately.
The Clue!	1994	2000	role-playing adventure game	own license	own license / Freeware	Neo Software	In 2000 the source code was released to the public. The game is since then ported to modern platforms via SDL and receives still updates by the community (2015).
The Guild of Thieves	1987	2017	adventure game	?	?	Magnetic Scrolls	In June 2017 Magnetic Scrolls worked on recovering the source code of their classics from tapes to remaster and re-release them.
The Wizard's Castle	1980	2004	role-playing adventure game	?	?	Joseph R. Power	The BASIC source code of the 1980 developed game was published by the developer in the July/August 1980 issue of Recreational Computing. Ports to other systems followed afterwards.
The Wheel of Time	1999	1999	FPS	Proprietary	Proprietary	Legend Entertainment	Game code and tools distributed with the official game release.
Tilt Brush	2016	2021	Room scale	Proprietary/Apache-2.0 (engine/game code)	Proprietary	Google	The Unity 2018.4.11f1 source code was uploaded to GitHub on January 26, 2021.
Tony Tough and the Night of Roasted Moths	2002	2012	Point and click adventure	Proprietary	Proprietary	Nayma Software	In 2012, DotEmu and Nayma Software gave the source code for this game to the ScummVM Team for its inclusion in ScummVM.
Tornado	1993	2017	combat flight simulator	?	Proprietary	Digital Integration / Interplay Entertainment	In March 2016 in the Tornado's community forum, rumors surfaced that Interplay Entertainment was working on a re-release of the game for digital distribution, based on the original source code. The assembly source code finally surfaced in January 2017 on github.com.
Trevor McFur in the Crescent Galaxy	1993	2008	Shoot 'em up	?	Proprietary	Flare II	Released by defunct Jaguar Sector II website under a CD compilation for PC titled Jaguar Source Code Collection on August 24, 2008. Source code was provided by Atari historian Curt Vendel.
Tron 2.0	2003	2009	FPS	?	?	Monolith Productions	Source code released with Lithtech Jupiter Enterprise b69 engine.
Ultima: Escape from Mt. Drash	1983	2003	Role-playing video game	Proprietary	Proprietary	Keith Zabalaoui / Sierra On-Line	On 11 June 2003, the game was ported to PC (under GPLv2 license) by Kasper Fauerby based on the original BASIC source code and some smaller binary reverse engineered parts.
Unreal	1998	2008	FPS	source opened to the community under NDA	Proprietary	Epic MegaGames	Headers and some code distributed with the official SDK. Also, some pre-release version (v0.87) is available on the internet. Around 2008 access to source-code was granted by Epic MegaGames to the OldUnreal game community. In 2015 Tim Sweeney announced that he hope to be able to open source one day the engine to the public.
Unreal Tournament 99	1999	2019	FPS	source opened to the community under NDA	Proprietary	Epic Games, Digital Extremes, Legend Entertainment	Headers and some code distributed with the official SDK. Around 2019 access to source-code was granted by Epic MegaGames to the OldUnreal game community.
Unreal Tournament 2003	2002	?	FPS	Proprietary	Proprietary	Epic Games	Game code was officially released.
Unreal Tournament 2004	2004	?	FPS	Proprietary	Proprietary	Epic Games	Game code was officially released.
Unreal Tournament 3	2007	?	FPS	Proprietary	Proprietary	Epic Games	Game code was officially released.
Uplink	2001	2003	Hacking simulation	Proprietary	Proprietary	Introversion Software	Mid-2003 Introversion Software started selling the source code for $45. Usage beside modding and fixing of the game are not permitted by the license. Source code of the games Darwinia + Multiwinia and DEFCON was later sold too.
Unreal II: The Awakening	2003	?	FPS	Proprietary	Proprietary	Legend Entertainment	Game code and tools distributed with the official game release.
Video Checkers	1980	2020	Board	Proprietary	Proprietary	Atari, Inc.	On April 8, 2020, Kay Savetz uploaded scans of the complete source code of the revision A of Video Checkers (a first-party video game for the Atari 2600) to the Internet Archive donated by its developer Carol Shaw.
VVVVVV	2010	2020	platformer	source available	Proprietary	Terry Cavanagh	On the 10th anniversary of the game's release in January 2020, Kavanagh released the source code for VVVVVV under a non-open source "VVVVVV Source Code License v1.0" via GitHub.
Warlords Battlecry III	2004	2006	RTS	Own proprietary license	Proprietary	Infinite Interactive/Enlight Software	On 24 May 2006, the Warlords Battlecry III source code became available to the public. Members of the community (who signed a NDA) have been entitled distributors, which have the legal permissions to allocate copies of the Warlords Battlecry III source code. The source code release resulted in the development of several community-made fan patches and mods.
War Worlds	2013	2014	RTS	Own permissive license	Own permissive license	Codeka / Dean Harding	The mobile strategy game was originally released commercially, and later released to the public to allow the community to continue the support of the game. With help of the community the game's main developer has continued the support since then.
Witchaven series	1995	2006	FPS	non-given	Proprietary	Capstone Software	Around 2006 Les Bird, a programmer from the 1996 folded game development company Capstone Software, released the source code of the games Witchaven, Witchaven II, William Shatner's TekWar and Corridor 7: Alien Invasion.
Worms Armageddon	1999	2002	Deathmatch game	?	Commercial	Team17	Around 2002 Team17, impressed by the reverse engineering on Worms Armageddon for "Silkworm", gave David "Deadcode" Ellsworth access to the source code. Over the next years he created unofficial patches, until he joined Team17 in 2006. Updates are still created as of 2015.
Xenonauts	2014	2015	Turn-based tactics	?	Proprietary	Goldhawk Interactive	Shortly after the release of the stable version Goldhawk Interactive allowed selected members of the community to access the source code. This resulted in the community edition of the game (Xenonauts:Community Edition, X:CE), which continues development of an independent branch of the game, adding new features and bugfixes.
XIII	2003	2018 (partly)	FPS	Proprietary	Proprietary	Ubisoft Paris	The UnrealScript source code of the game was made available on GitHub in January 2018.

== See also ==
- Category:Commercial video games with freely available source code.
- List of open-source game engines
- List of commercial video games with available source code
- List of open-source video games
- List of formerly proprietary software
- List of commercial video games released as freeware
- List of freeware games
- List of proprietary source-available software
- Source port
- Source-available software
