= List of proprietary source-available software =

This is a list of proprietary source-available software, which has available source code, but is not classified as free software or open-source software. In some cases, this type of software is originally sold and released without the source code, and the source code becomes available later. Sometimes, the source code is released under a liberal software license at its end of life. This type of software can also have its source code leaked or reverse engineered.

While such software often later becomes open source software or public domain, other constructs and software licenses exist, for instance shared source or creative commons licenses. If the source code is given out without specified license or public domain waiver it has legally to be considered as still proprietary due to the Berne Convention.

For a list of video game software with available source code, see List of commercial video games with available source code. For specifically formerly proprietary software which is now free software, see List of formerly proprietary software.

Title	Original author	Original release	Source code availability	OpenSource compatible	Freeware (data and software)	Complete Free software (DFSG compatible)	New license	Notes
Amazon Lumberyard	Amazon	2002	2016	No	Yes	No	proprietary license	On 16 August 2017, the source code of the game engine was made freely available under proprietary license terms via GitHub.
Apple DOS	Apple Inc.	1986	2015	No	No	No	non-commercial license	The Apple DOS source code was released by the Computer History Museum after Paul Laughton, the creator of the code, donated it.
Photoshop 1.0.1	Adobe Systems Inc.	1990	February 2013	No	?	No	Computer History Museum Software License (non-commercial license)	Adobe Systems Inc. made the source code of the 1990 version 1.0.1 of Photoshop available to the Computer History Museum. Includes all the code with the exception of the MacApp applications library which was licensed from Apple.
Bitstream Vera (font)	Bitstream Inc.	Unknown	2003	?	Yes (non-commercial)	No (can't be sold by itself)	custom non-commercial	Through the efforts of Bitstream and the GNOME Foundation
Build	Ken Silverman	1995	2000	No	Yes	No	own non-commercial license	
Commodore 64 firmware	Commodore International	1982	2012	No	No	No		Around 2012 Dennis Jarvis, ex-Commodore engineer, made material and source code of the development history of the C64 available. Later the source code was cleaned up, reformated and made build-able again in a GitHub projects by enthusiasts.
Call to Power II	Activision	2000	2003	No	No	No	own non-commercial license	Source code was handed to the community to allow them self-support.
CuneiForm	Cognitive Technologies	1993	2008	?	?	?	BSD	Optical character recognition software
Deluxe Paint I (1986)	Electronic Arts	1996	2015	No	Yes	No	non-commercial license	Source code of an early version released by Electronic Arts in 2015.
Duke Nukem 3D	3D Realms	1996	2003	Yes	No	No	GPL-2.0-or-later	Game code only, no data, no engine.
Doom	id Software	1993	1997	Yes	No	No	id software license/later GPLv2+	Code only. Originally released under a restrictive license in 1997, in 1999 re-licensed under GPL-2.0-or-later.
DR-DOS/Caldera OpenDOS 7.01	Caldera (company)	1976	May 1997	?	?	?	Caldera's OpenDOS End-User License Agreement	The Caldera OpenDOS 7.01 source code was a base for the DR-DOS/OpenDOS Enhancement Project in 2002.
Furby	David Hampton	1998	August 2018	?	?	?	Public Domain (?)	In August 2018, after contacting the US patent office, a PDF scan of the toy's assembler language firmware from the patent's appendix became available on the internet. Later it was archived by the Internet Archive, and then manually corrected and transcribed to assemble-able code again by an enthusiast.
FPS Creator Classic	The Game Creators	1999 (?)	February 2016	No	Yes	No	undefined	In February 2016 authors decided to release "FPS Creator" as "FPS Creator Classic" source available (no defined license) with many model packs on github.com.
Helix (multimedia project)	RealNetworks		2002	?	Yes	No	RealNetworks Community Source License	The Helix Community is an open collaborative effort to develop and extend the Helix DNA platform.
HoverRace	GrokkSoft	1996	2006	?	No	No	originally time limited license / later non-commercial GrokkSoft HoverRace SourceCode License.	
Jump 'n Bump	Brainchild Design	1998	1999	?	Yes	No	Emailware	Source code released under an emailware license.
Java	Sun Microsystems	1995	1998	No	Yes	No	Sun Community Source License	In 1998 Sun Microsystems released much of Java under the terms of the Sun Community Source License.
MacPaint	Apple Inc.	1984	2010	No	Yes	No	non-commercial license	MacPaint 1.3's source code (written in a combination of Assembly and Pascal) is available through the Computer History Museum, along with the QuickDraw source code.
Marathon 2: Durandal	Bungie	1995	2000	Yes	No	No	GPL-3.0-or-later	The code was released under the GPL-2.0-or-later, then GPL-3.0-or-later, while the data is still proprietary. Now known as Aleph One
Mega (service)	Mega Limited	201?	2017	No	No	No	MEGA Limited Code Review License	Mega Limited released the source code to their client-side software around 28 January 2017 under an own license on github.com.
MS-DOS 1.25 and 2.0	Microsoft	1982	2018	Yes	Yes	Yes	MIT	On 25 March 2014 Microsoft made the code to MS-DOS 1.25 and 2.0 available to the public under a Microsoft Research License for educational purposes. In 2018 they relicensed them under MIT license.
Microsoft Word for Windows version 1.1a	Microsoft	1991	2014	No	Yes	No	Microsoft Research License (non-commercial license)	Microsoft made the source code of the 1991 version of Word available to the Computer History Museum and to the public for educational purposes.
MidasWWW	Tony Johnson and Chung Huynh	1992	2015	?	Yes	?	unspecified	16 November 1992 sources were made available in June 2015 at GitHub without specified license.
NASTRAN	NASA	1960	2001	?	?	?	own license	In 2001 the NASA released with the "NASA Classics" package also the Finite Element Analysis simulator's source code to the public for free.
NCSA Mosaic 2.7	NCSA	1993	March 2010	?	Yes	?	own license	first graphical browser
NetBeans		1997	October 2007	Yes	Yes	No	Apache-2.0	An integrated development environment (IDE) for Java and other programming languages
Netscape Enterprise Server	Sun Microsystems		January 2009	?		?	BSD	Sun Microsystems open sourced it.
PhysX	Nvidia	2004	2015	Yes	Yes	Yes	3-clause BSD license (Proprietary until 2018 except for Xbox One, PlayStation 4, and Nintendo Switch)	At GDC 2015, Nvidia made the PhysX' source code available on GitHub, but requires registration on developer.nvidia.com and EULA signing. Since December 2018, Nvidia relicensed the PhysX' source code under the 3-clause BSD license for Apple iOS, macOS, Google Android ARM, Linux, and Microsoft Windows
Pine (email client)		1989	1996	?	?	?	own license	Before 1996 under BSD license, it was switched to a proprietary license while still having the source code available.
Quake	id Software	1996	1999	Yes	No	No	GPL-2.0-or-later	The map sources were also released under the GPL in 2006.
Rise of the Triad	3D Realms	1994	2002	Yes	No	No	GPL-2.0-or-later	Only the code was released under the GPL-2.0-or-later.
Stellar Frontier	Stardock	1997	2008	No	Yes	No	Stardock Shared Source Stellar Frontier License (non-commercial license)	Stellar Frontier is a multiplayer space strategy/shooter game made by Doug Hendrix in 1995 and published by Stardock. Stardock closed the master server on 4 August 2006, ceasing official support for multiplayer mode but released the source code under a shared source license in 2008.
Swiss Post E-Voting System	Scytl	unknown	2021	No	No	No	own license	The software was originally developed by Scytl, but purchased by Swiss Post in 2020. Some parts of the system are released under an open source license, but the main part is not.
Symbian	Nokia	1997 (as Psion EPOC32)	2010	Yes	Yes	No	EPL / Nokia Symbian License	
Take 2	Cellsoft / Geert Vergauwe	?	2015	?	Yes	?	"open source freeware"	The popular animation software for the Amiga was gifted in 2015 to the community by the original developer, including the 68k assembly source code.
Technicolor TC72xx chipset cable modem firmware/eCos	Technicolor	2008	2015	Yes	Yes	?	GPLv2, lGPL, eCos 2.0 license	Released on GitHub on 30. November 2015.
v8 Unix, v9, v10	Unix Heritage Society and Alcatel-Lucent	1985	2017	No	Yes	No	non-copyright enforcement grant on non-commercial usage	In 2017, Unix Heritage Society and Alcatel-Lucent USA Inc., on behalf of itself and Nokia Bell Laboratories, released v8, v9, v10 under the condition: "will not assert its copyright rights with respect to any non-commercial copying, distribution, performance, display or creation of derivative works of Research Unix®1 Editions 8, 9, and 10".
Unrar	Rarlabs	1995	2000	No	Yes	No	own unrar license	Unrar source code was released by Eugene Roshal/RARlabs sometime in 2000. A GPL fork of older codebase exists.
Unreal Engine	Epic Games	1998	2014	No	Yes	No	own unrar license	
Warzone 2100	Pumpkin Studios/Eidos Interactive	March 1999	December 2004	Yes	Yes (only movies not)	Yes (GPL-2.0-or-later, only movies not)	GPL-2.0-or-later	Video game by Eidos Interactive
Watcom C compiler	Watcom	1988	2003	Yes	Yes	No	Sybase Open Watcom Public License	Released as Open Watcom, under a license which is considered free by the OSI but not by the FSF. The FSF has problems with the license as it demands more freedom than the GPL by requiring the release of source code also in the case of private use.
Xerox Alto	Computer History Museum	1975	2014	No	Yes	No	own non-commercial license	On 21 October 2014, Xerox Alto's source code and other resources were released from the Computer History Museum.

== See also ==
- List of commercial video games with available source code
- List of formerly proprietary software
- List of open-weight large language models
- List of public domain software
- Open-core model
- Source-available software
