= Super Lemonade Factory =

2012 video game

- Developer: Initials Command
- Director: Shane Brouwer
- Artists: Miguelito; Doggerland
- Composer: Easyname
- Series: Super Lemonade Factory
- Engine: Flixel, Adobe AIR
- Platforms: iOS, Windows, Mac OS X, Ouya
- Release: iOS: WW: March 14, 2012; Windows, Mac OS X: WW: July 9, 2012; Ouya: WW: November 29, 2013
- Modes: Single-player, multiplayer

Super Lemonade Factory is a puzzle-platform video game developed by Initials Command.

== Gameplay ==
Super Lemonade Factory is a puzzle-platform game where players assume the role of two player characters after World War II, Andre and Liselot. Andre's father offers the soft drink factory to his son after he and his wife, Liselot, make a tour of the entire factory. Liselot can perform a double jump, push crates, and talk to other characters, while Andre can smash bigger crates and carry Liselot. The player will need to play as both characters to finish the levels. A level editor based on the Ogmo Editor was included in desktop versions.

== Development and release ==
Super Lemonade Factory was originally released for iOS on March 14, 2012. The game was released for Microsoft Windows and Mac OS X via IndieVania on July 9 of the same year. It was released on Steam on July 9, 2014, after successfully getting Greenlit by the community. The game was released for Ouya on November 29, 2013.

== Reception ==
Reception

Aggregate score
Aggregator	Score
Metacritic	74/100

Review scores
Publication	Score
Gamezebo	3/5
Pocket Gamer	3.5/5
AppSpy	4/5
TouchArcade	4/5

Super Lemonade Factory received "mixed" reviews according to the review aggregation website Metacritic.

AppSpy, TouchArcade and 148Apps rated it 4/5. Slide To Play gave it a 3/4.

Pocket Gamer rated it 3.5/5. Gamezebo rated it 3/5.

== Legacy ==
A sequel, Super Lemonade Factory Part Two, was released for iOS on November 12, 2013, and for Microsoft Windows, OS X and Ouya on May 17, 2014. A free demake titled Super Lemonade Factory 1989 was released for Microsoft Windows and Ouya in 2014.

In July 2012, Shane Brouwer uploaded the source code to the iOS and AIR versions of the game under the MIT License (same license as Flixel) on GitHub. The assets are included in the repositories, but are not under a free license. The game was released as freeware on itch.io on February 2, 2021. The entire source code repository (source code and art assets) for the Ouya version was released under the GPL-3.0-only license on GitHub two days later to support the efforts for the preservation of Ouya games.
