= WaterRace =

2000 video game

- Developers: French Touch, SàRL
- Publishers: French Touch, SàRL
- Designer: Pierre-Olivier Latour
- Composer: Israel Delgado
- Platform: Mac OS
- Release: December 23, 2000
- Genre: Racing
- Modes: Single-player, Multiplayer

WaterRace is a Macintosh computer game developed and released by French Touch in December 2000. It is a boat racing game with 9 levels (or locations) and 9 corresponding boats and characters.
