= No Gravity (video game) =

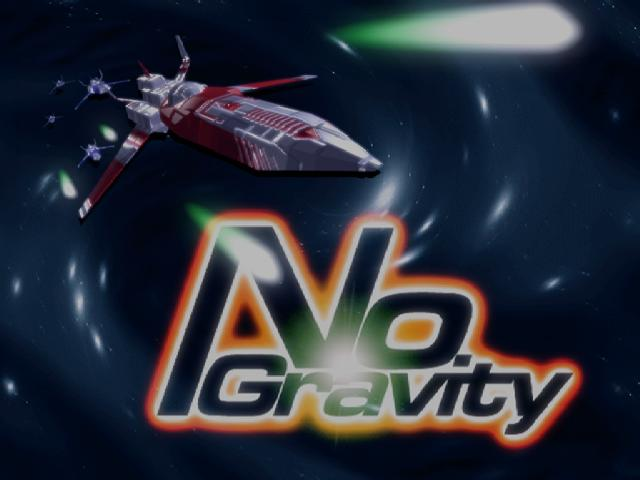
- No Gravity PC title screen
- Developer: RealTech VR
- Publisher: RealTech VR / Anozor (PSN)
- Producer: Vincent Black / S. Rubens (PSN)
- Designer: R. Genevois
- Programmer: Vincent Black
- Artist: R.Genevois
- Composer: Alexandre Livernaux
- Engine: V3X
- Platforms: iOS, HP webOS, Android, PSP, Mac OS X
- Release: 1990s, February 2005 (open source)
- Genre: Action
- Mode: Single-player

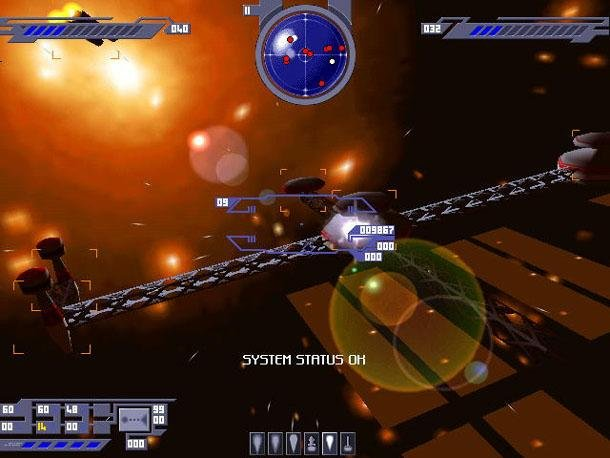
Screenshot of the classic PC version

No Gravity is a space flight simulation and space shooter developed by realtech VR, a Montreal based, French Canadian independent computer games company. The game was ported to many platforms over the years as it was open sourced in 2005. No Gravity drew comparisons with the Wing Commander series.

== Gameplay ==
No Gravity is a 3D space shooter that allows players to pilot a spaceship from either a first-person or third-person perspective. The game features pre-designed missions that are divided into multiple sectors. Each sector has specific objectives, such as destroying enemy ships or bases, escorting allied ships, or clearing minefields.

Upon completing the objectives within a sector, the player must navigate their ship to an object called a "navpoint," similar to the navigation system in the Wing Commander series. Reaching the navpoint transitions the player to the next sector. In the final sector of a mission, a wormhole appears, signaling the end of the level. After completing a mission, a debrief screen displays the mission duration, score, shooting accuracy, and a ranking based on the player's hit-to-shot ratio.

The mobile versions of No Gravity include additional control options, leveraging touch and accelerometer gyroscope functionality for ship maneuvering. On-screen controls are also provided, offering an alternative way to navigate and control the ship.

== History ==
The game originates from a late 1990s realtech VR BeOS game called SpaceGirl, which was later renamed to No Gravity.

=== Open source ===
In February 2005 realtech VR open sourced No Gravity with the creation of a SourceForge repository. The source code and assets of the classic No Gravity are released under the terms of the GNU GPL-2.0-or-later, making the game freeware and free and open source software. The game was made available for Windows XP, AmigaOS, Linux, macOS, and BeOS.

The game was ported by the community to the PSP. In 2014 a port of the classic version on the OpenPandora handheld followed.

=== Extended mobile versions ===
In 2009 an extended official PSP port, named No Gravity: The Plague of Mind to differentiate from the "classic" older version, was released. In 2011 an iOS port followed, and later for Windows mobile and OUYA in 2013.

== Reception ==
The game was offered by multiple websites as freeware download and reviewed several times over the years.

The classic No Gravity was downloaded alone via SourceForge between 2005 and May 2017 over 270,000 times.

Metacritic rated the PSP version with 65% from eight reviews.
