= Good Robot =

2016 shoot 'em up by Pyrodactyl

- Developer: Pyrodactyl Games
- Publisher: Pyrodactyl Games
- Director: Arvind Raja Yadav
- Designers: Arvind Raja Yadav; Ross Zevenhuizen III
- Programmers: Arvind Raja Yadav; Shamus Young
- Artist: Mikk Luige
- Writer: Adam DeCamp
- Composer: Shamus Young
- Platform: Windows
- Release: April 5, 2016
- Genre: Multidirectional shooter
- Mode: Single-player

Good Robot is a 2016 multidirectional shooter video game developed and published by Pyrodactyl Games. The game was released for Microsoft Windows on April 5, 2016.

== Gameplay ==
Good Robot is a shoot 'em up where players assume the role of the last good robot of PyroCorp fighting on procedurally generated levels against the defective robots that decided to exterminate humanity. For each destroyed robot, the player earns money that can be used for upgrades or to buy hats that grant invulnerability for one hit.

== Development ==
In 2013, Shamus Young made a prototype of a 2D shooter inspired by titles like Descent. However, Young decided to cancel the project in 2014. The following year, Pyrodactyl contacted him to finish the game. The game was released on April 5, 2016, on Steam. It was also planned to be released on GOG.com, but it was rejected. A Linux version was also in the plans, but it was cancelled. On August 3, 2020, Arvind Raja Yadav from Pyrodactyl Games released the source code for the game under the MIT License on GitHub.

== Reception ==
Reception

Aggregate score
Aggregator	Score
Metacritic	67/100

Review scores
Publication	Score
4Players	65/100
IGN India	8/10
IGN Spain	6/10

Good Robot received "mixed" reviews according to the review aggregation website Metacritic. IGN India gave it a score of 8/10, criticizing the lack of local multiplayer and an arcade mode.
