= Tribal Trouble =

2005 video game

- Developer: Oddlabs
- Publisher: GarageGames
- Platforms: Microsoft Windows, Mac OS X, Linux
- Release: March 31, 2005
- Genre: Real-time strategy
- Mode: Multiplayer

Tribal Trouble is a real-time strategy video game for PC. The game pits natives of tropical islands against invading Vikings. The game was originally developed by independent studio Oddlabs. The game was well received by the press and has won several awards.

== Development and release ==
The game was originally developed by independent studio Oddlabs and released on March 31, 2005. It was released for Microsoft Windows, Mac OS X, and Linux.

In September 2014 the game's source code was released to the public on GitHub and is now open source under the GPLv2. Development continues in a community fork.

== Reception ==
Inside Mac Games reviewed the game.

The game has won several awards, including four top 5 positions in indie game review site GameTunnel's 2005 awards in the categories of best multiplayer game, best graphics, best strategy game and best game overall.

== Sequel ==
A sequel, Tribal Trouble 2, was in development in 2011.
