= Roboforge =

2001 strategy game

- Original author: Liquid Edge ltd
- Developers: Darren Green; M. Ward; H. Calveley; Y. Ly; M. De Freitas
- Release: May 2001
- Stable release: 1.34 / January 28, 2008; 18 years ago
- Written in: Java
- Size: 34MB
- Available in: English
- Type: Programming game/Strategy game/Game artificial intelligence
- License: BSD

Roboforge is a strategy game developed by Liquid Edge and released in 2001.

== Brief history ==
RoboForge is a video game released in 2001 by Liquid Edge, a small company mainly created to develop and sell this game. The company's founder, Darren Green, was inspired by the well known Robot Wars. He noticed that Robot Wars was an interesting game, but the cost of a real bot and the know-how required drastically restricted its spread, so he decided to virtualize Robot Wars concepts into a new PC game, calling it RoboForge.

RoboForge introduced an innovative concept: building own robot (also called "bot" or "bots") on a limited virtual cost budget, then enter it into an arena with one other robot and run a full 3D robot battle until a robot's CPU or chassis is destroyed or time is called. Liquid Edge announced the game in July 2000 and then released the first version on May 23, 2001.

From July 2008 RoboForge became an open-source project with the Java-based source code available under a non-commercial license. The game's community continues development and it is now possible to download the game, build bots and enter them into amateur tournaments for free.

== Reception ==
Since 2001 RoboForge attracted the interest of many gaming review websites as well as gaming magazines. The general consensus was that RoboForge wasn't an "easy" game and that it required a lot of time and effort to build competitive robots.
