= Ryzom =

2004 video game

- Developers: Nevrax, community contributors
- Composer: Frédéric Motte
- Platforms: Microsoft Windows, OS X, Linux
- Release: EU: September 16, 2004; NA: September 19, 2004
- Genre: Massively multiplayer online role-playing game
- Mode: Multiplayer

Ryzom, also known as The Saga of Ryzom, is a free and open source massively multiplayer online role-playing game (MMORPG) for Microsoft Windows, OS X, and Linux. It was developed by Nevrax, released in 2004, and became free software in 2010. It takes place in a science fantasy world called Atys.

== Gameplay ==
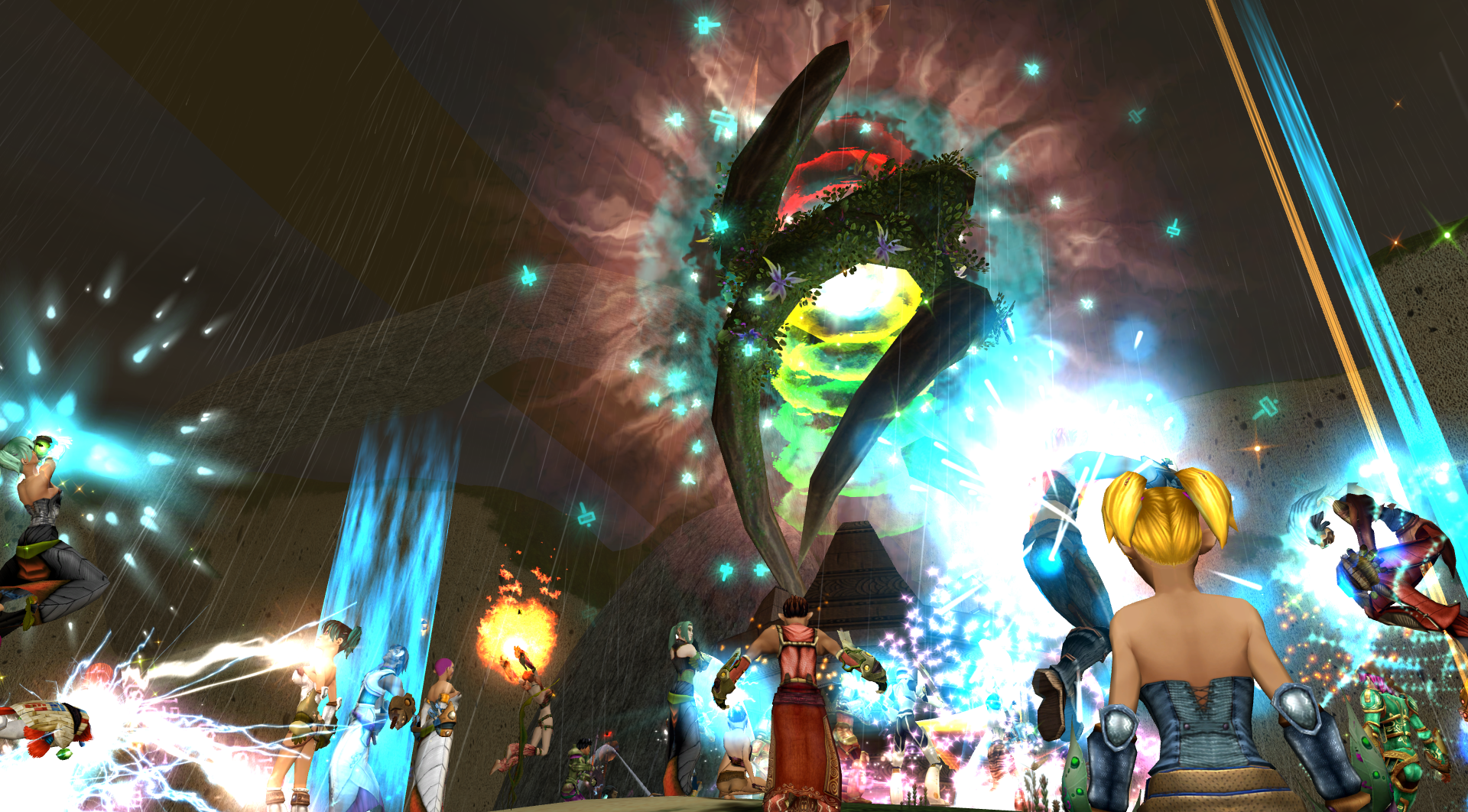
Screenshot of Ryzom's "Lakeland Thievery Event" (2014)

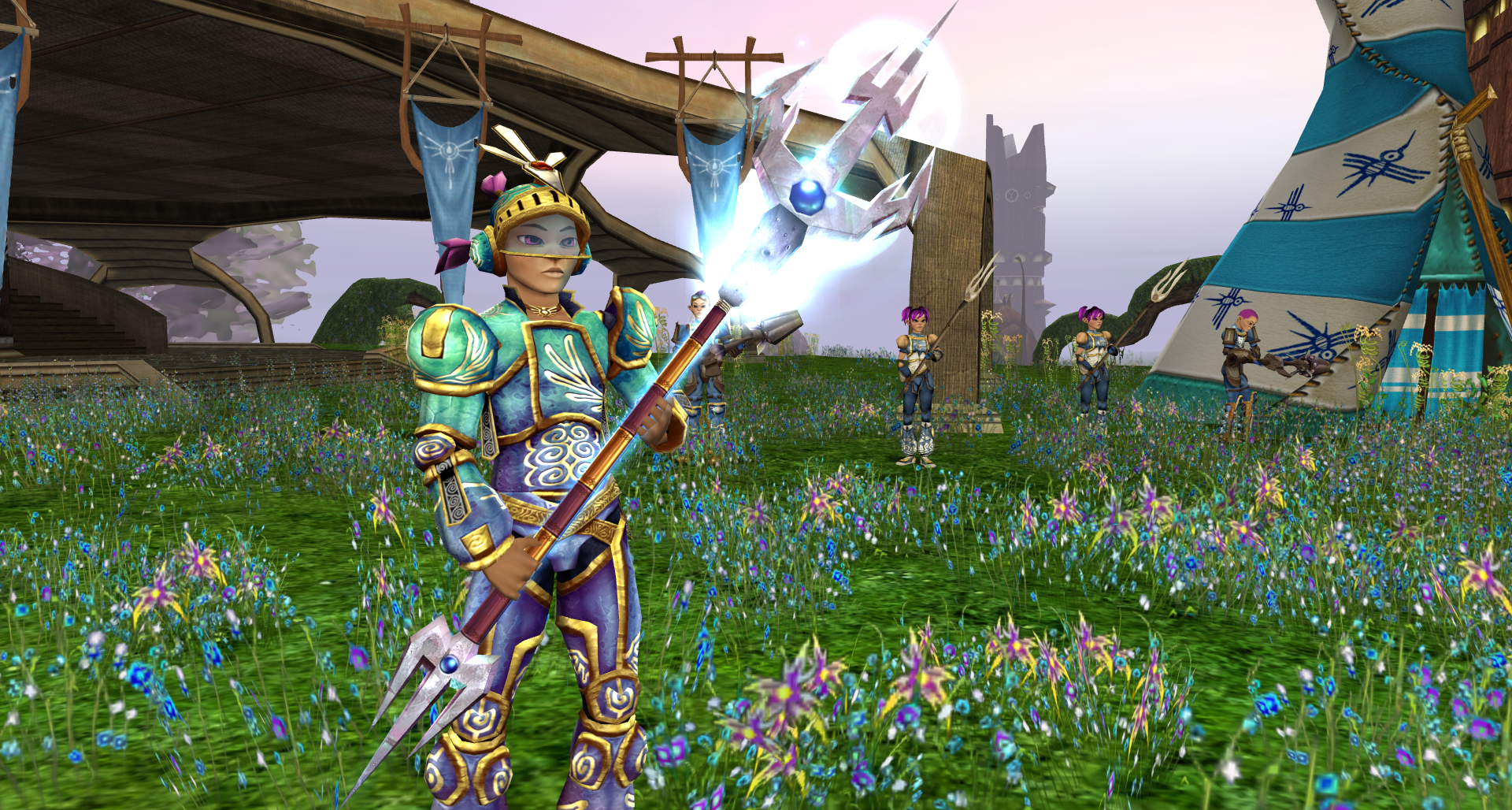
Screenshot of Ryzom (2014)

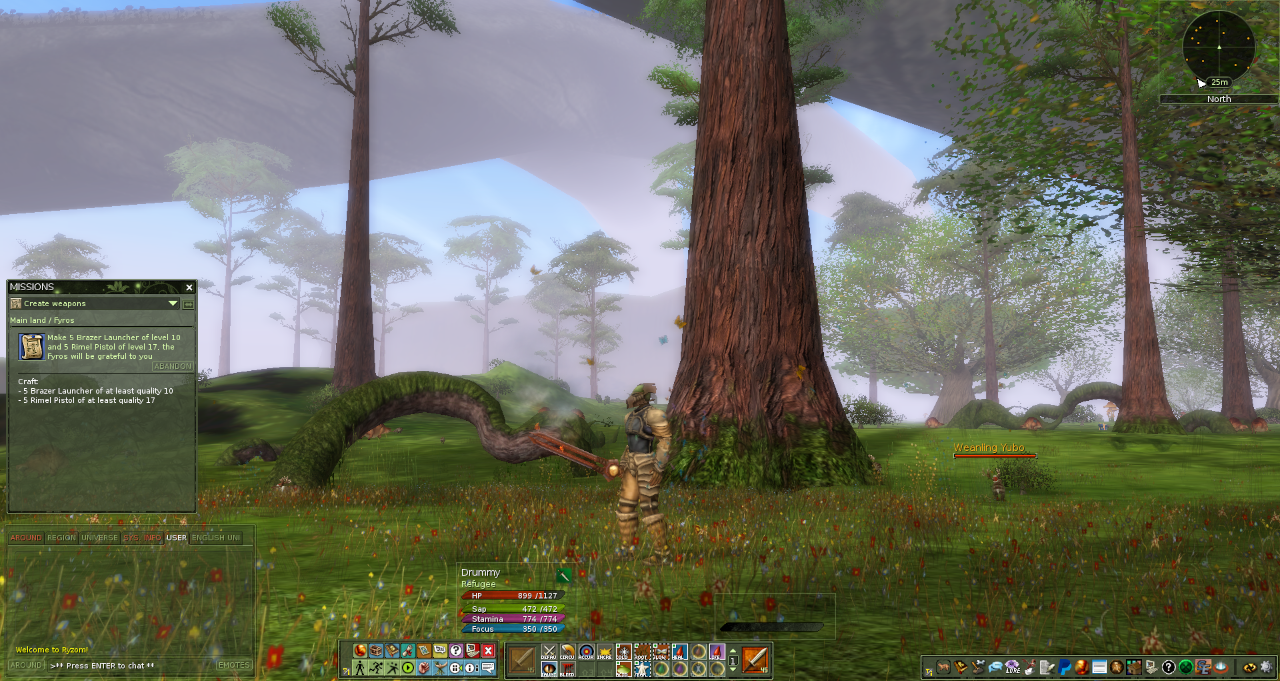
Screenshot of Ryzom (2019)

Ryzom features open world gameplay. Instead of character classes, it has a unique system for character abilities that allows players to construct custom actions like spells or attacks in detail. The game world is complex modeled, incorporating realistic effects like changing weather and seasons. Computer controlled entities ('mobs') display complex behaviors, and animals will, for example, graze in herds or hunt in packs. Ryzom offers a scenario editor that lets players design their own areas that can be uploaded and played on the official server.

=== Skill system ===
Each character gains levels independently in the fields of weapon-oriented fighting, magic, crafting, and harvesting simply by performing appropriate acts (killing enemies with a sword for fighting, assembling jewelry for crafting, etc.) Each level gained in one of these fields awards the character 10 skill points that can be spent on new abilities specific to that field, on general character improvements, or simply saved.

As a character progresses in levels, the skills become more refined. For instance, a starting character casting spells will acquire points in the skill called "magic". After level 20, points are accumulated in either "offensive magic" or "defensive magic", and attack spells will add points to the former, while healing spells add to the latter category. At later levels, these are also split, allowing higher level characters to specialize.

All player actions are built of components called stanzas. Each stanza defines one of the action's effects, costs, or usage restrictions. Players may assemble actions out of any legal combination of stanzas their character knows.

Components for crafting can come from the corpses of killed animals or from hidden resource deposits scattered throughout Atys. Different ingredients provide varying benefits to different characteristics of the finished object. For example, when crafting a mace, using a certain kind of animal bone for the head may produce a hard-hitting but slow weapon, while using a particular wood may produce a weapon that is fast and gives a large bonus to parrying enemy attacks, but causes less damage. Further complicating things is the fact that any ingredient may occur in one of five classes and with a quality from 1 to 250, all of which affect the attributes of the final product.

Harvesting is a complex and sometimes team-oriented procedure. The player must first locate the desired materials using prospecting skills, as resources give no visible sign of their presence. If he does not have teammates to aid him, he may need to balance his work between extracting the resource and treating the extraction site to prevent it from collapsing prematurely or exploding. The site's location and the harvester's own skill levels both affect the maximum possible quality of the extracted resource.

=== Player vs. player ===
In general, player characters are not allowed to attack other player characters or peaceful non-player characters. The exception is specifically marked zones, either smaller areas, like the PvP arena in the starting region, or larger regions, like the "Prime Roots" of Atys. It is also possible to engage other players in one-on-one combat (duels), this requires acceptance by both combatants.

== Game world ==
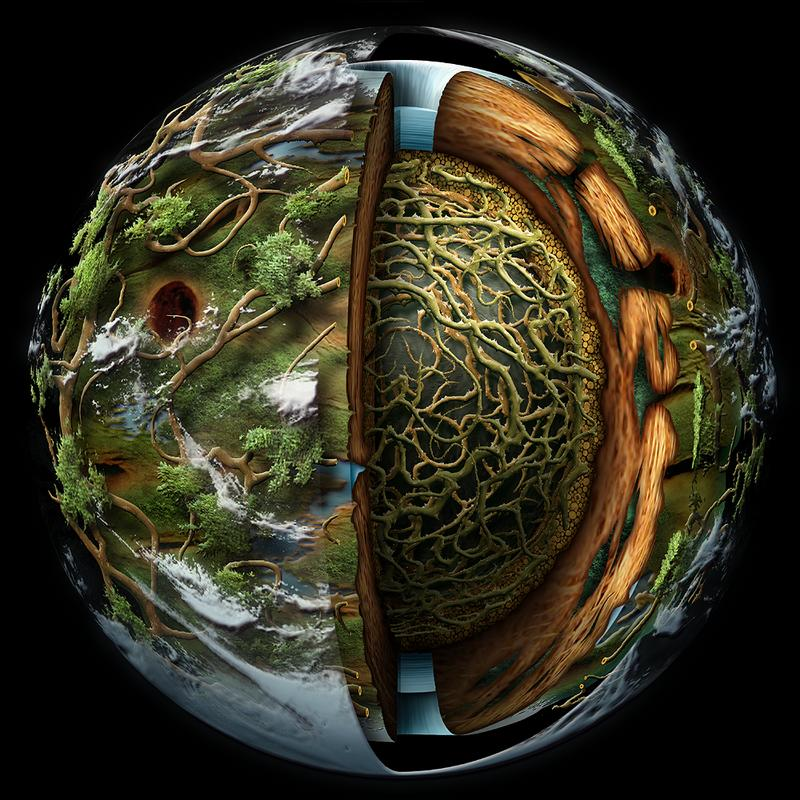
Atys, the layered world of Ryzom

The game takes place on the planet Atys. Unlike normal planets, Atys is an enormous tree large enough to sustain an atmosphere and multiple ecosystems on its surface and within immense networks of branches and roots. The various creatures in Ryzom have differing AI based upon their species that allows them to perform many realistic behaviors, such as migration and movement as a herd. Carnivores, for example, will attack specific animals for food, and certain animals hunt in packs. The game also features changing seasons and weather. Weather effects include rain, snow, and wind. Tied to the season and weather changes are the movements of animals and the availability of harvestable materials. For example, a certain type of sap may only be harvested during spring rains and be unattainable during other seasons or weather conditions. Weather conditions can change minute by minute. Each game season (spring, summer, fall, and winter) lasts four real-time days.

Player characters come from one of four distinct humanoid races, collectively called "homins". The 'Matis' are a proud and noble race of forest dwellers. They have mastered the art that is a fusion of botany and genetic manipulation, and consequently they have constructed their kingdom and castles from massive trees grown for that very purpose. The 'Tryker' are a fiercely independent and fun-loving race of lake dwellers. They build large floating cities on their lakes, and networks of wind-powered water pumps around them. The 'Zoraï' are a spiritual and tranquil race of jungle dwellers. They build their temple-cities within naturally fortified areas of the jungle. Finally, the 'Fyros' are a tough and obstinate race of desert dwellers. They have mastered fire technology, which they like to build into their weapons and architecture.

Interacting benevolently with all four homin cultures, but hostile towards each other, were two additional and far more advanced races: the magical Kami and the technological Karavan. The Kami are depicted as elusive, chaotic, playful, and highly protective of Atys, while the Karavan are more secretive and have never been shown outside their environmental suits or far from their machinery. The Matis, and to a lesser extent, the Tryker, cultures tend to ally with the Karavan, while the Zoraï and Fyros tend to side with the Kami.

In the game year 2481, the homin races were decimated when the hostile, insect-like Kitins were accidentally released from their home deep within Atys's root system. Surviving refugees from all four homin cultures began working together in 2485 to rebuild a single, mixed society in relatively remote areas. Soon came the added threat of the "Goo," a spreading infestation that renders areas uninhabitable and drives wildlife mad with rage. At release, the game year was 2525.

New characters come from one of the four homin races, and start out as refugees, they are scattered survivors of the kitin invasion who have somehow managed to make it to an area called the Ruins of Silan. This area, which is not connected to the rest of Atys, contains a variety of animals, as well as various traders and trainers, and representatives for the cultures in the game. There are several NPCs providing missions, including four whose missions act as tutorials in the four skill areas (fighting, magic, crafting, and foraging).

When a character decides to, he or she may choose to travel (teleportation) to the main world (called the mainland), and must choose one of the four homin capitals to travel to. This decision can not be reversed, and although it is possible to travel between capitals, the journey is long and dangerous, even for experienced characters.

== History ==
=== Development and release ===
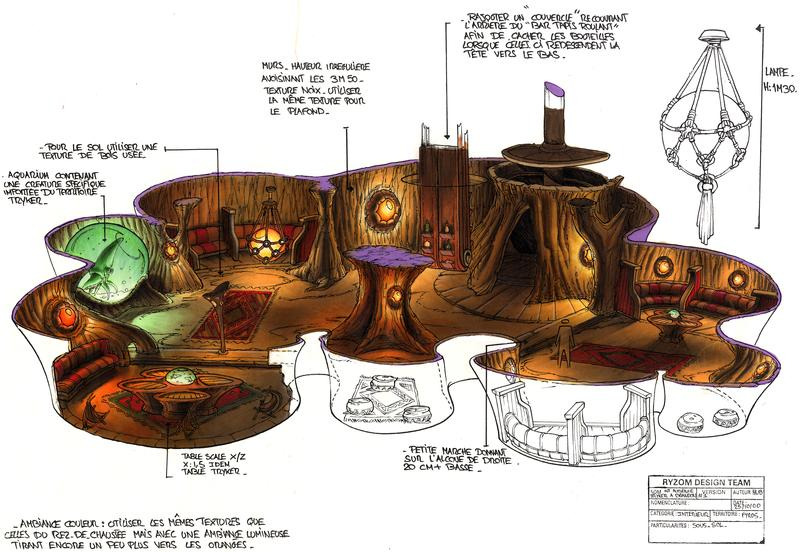
Concept art for Ryzom

The independent French game development studio Nevrax began development of Ryzom, and the underlying game engine NeL (for Nevrax Library), around 2000. In October 2002 Nevrax made the NeL engine open source as free software using the GPL. The game launched in September 2004 with the name The Saga of Ryzom and received little attention at the time. The publisher was Winch Gate.

After the initial release, several updates were released as "Chapters", providing new features and content. The first update, titled Changing Times, featured the addition of a merchants system in which players could sell their crafted items using vendors. It also revamped several of the game's key systems, including prospecting and harvesting. On December 13, 2004 the first part of three from Chapter Two: Open Conflict was released, the third on January 13, 2005. Major features included the addition of the encyclopedia system and the addition of player mounts. Chapter Three: Outposts was released on December 19, 2005. Major features included the introductions of PvP outposts as well as major changes to the game's fame system. On June 15, 2006 an update called the New Player Experience was released. It replaced the beginning area with an area called The Ruins of Silan, which provided more tutorial material for beginners. On October 3, 2006 an expansion called Ryzom Ring was released, offering players the ability to create their own content in the form of scenarios. It provides a scenario editor where players can design content, and subsequently upload it to the game's main servers. Other players may then access the player-created areas through terminals located in each race's capital city. In August 2006, the game's name was simplified to Ryzom for marketing purposes.

=== Commercial problems and "Free Ryzom Campaign" ===
Since the game was not a commercial success, Nevrax announced, on November 20, 2006, that it would enter receivership sometime in December. On November 21, Nevrax confirmed that "Nevrax as a corporate entity will probably cease to exist in a few weeks" and announced that "several companies and/or individuals are actively engaged in negotiations to take over Ryzom".

In response, the "Free Ryzom Campaign" was launched in order to gather enough funds from crowdfunding donations to purchase Ryzom and release the game as free software. On December 14, 2006 the Free Software Foundation pledged a donation of 60,000 dollars, but the campaign ultimately raised €172,988 instead of the €200,000 requested.

=== Nevrax and Ryzom sold ===
On December 21, 2006, Nevrax SARL was eventually sold to the owners of Gameforge AG, a German company specialising in browser games, which started up GameForge France SARL as a 'sister company' and transferred all the rights. Less than a year later, Gameforge France had filed for bankruptcy. As GameForge had not fully paid for the Nevrax assets, these were returned to the original liquidator.

Currently, the game can be played free of charge with a limitation on character level.

=== Source code and assets freely released ===
On May 6, 2010, Ryzom announced the full release of source code under GNU AGPL-3.0-or-later and the artwork under CC-BY-SA-3.0, and a partnership with the Free Software Foundation to host a repository of the game's artistic assets.

Since then, Ryzom has been community-developed. Ryzom offers a portal for open-source development of their GPL licensed engine NeL, on which the game Ryzom is based.

Since 2010 all the software's source code is available as free software under the AGPL-3.0-or-later license. Similarly, the game's artistic work is available as open content under the CC-BY-SA-3.0 license. The game's 3D models and textures were ported to the Blender software format in 2016.

== Availability ==
Ryzom is free-to-play available for Microsoft Windows, Mac OS X and Linux on the official servers. The game requires registration, and a paid subscription is required for characters to advance beyond level 125. Each account may have up to five different characters. Prior to 2012, there were three different Ryzom servers that used the same game world, but were differentiated by language, with the choice of English, French, or German being offered when starting a game. In 2012, all three servers (Arispotle, Aniro, and Leanon) were unified into one server (Atys), an event long-time players refer to as "The Merge". Many of Ryzom's chat channels utilize DeepL translation to facilitate communication between players who do not share a common language.

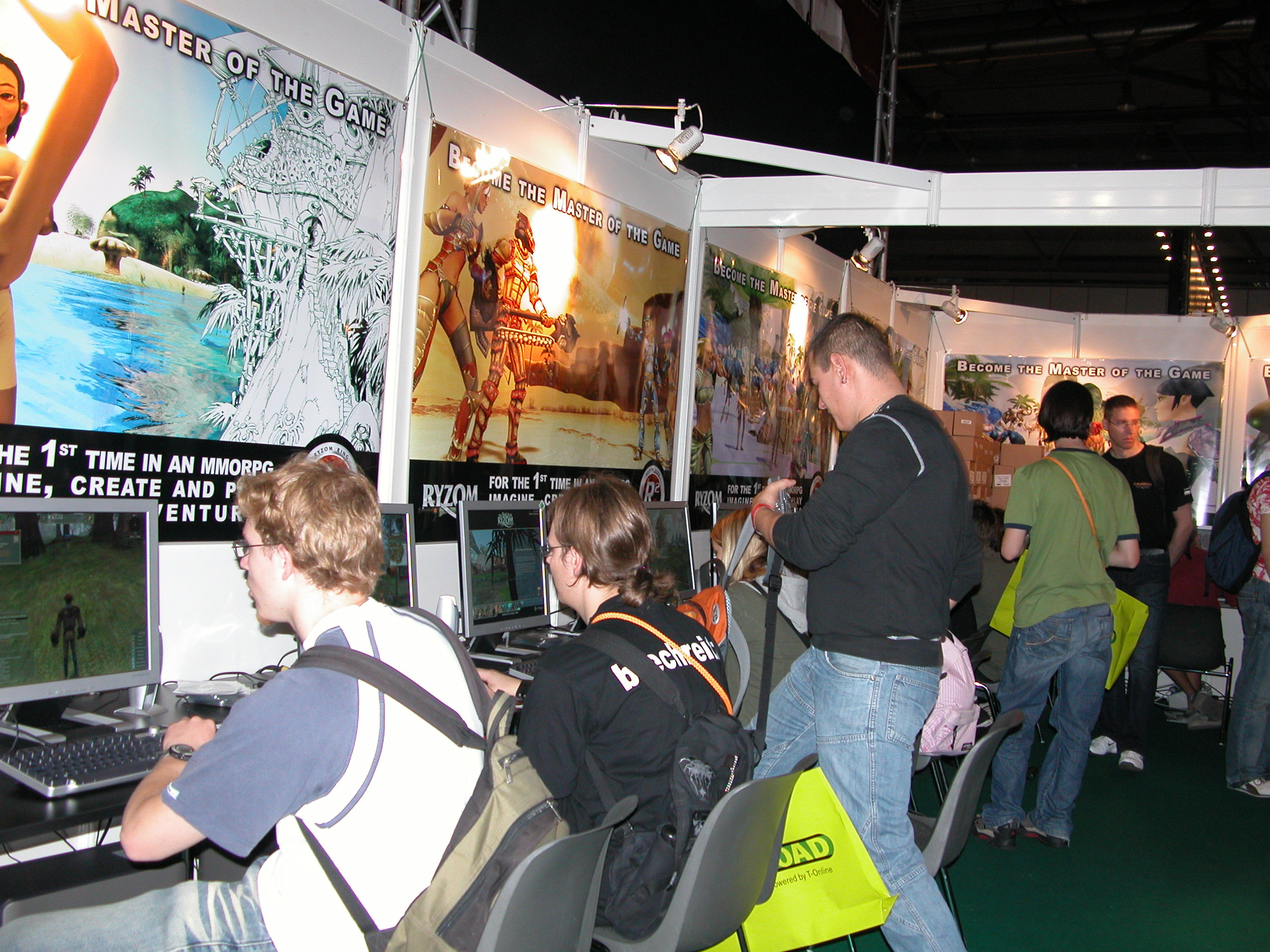
Ryzom at the Games Convention in Leipzig 2006

From the start, the client software, referred to as NeL, for the Nevrax Library, was released as free software under the GPL. As of May 6, 2010, the entire software base, including client, server, and associated tools, was made available under the AGPL-3.0-or-later license, and current development uses a community-based open source model. A 13GB archive containing all textures and effects, 3D models, animations, characters and clothing (but not music or sounds) was released under a CC-BY-SA-3.0 license. The commercial ongoing game-world data (story plots, quests, maps, lore, etc.) is not available for download, so as not to disrupt the fan-base. Also, in order to combat cheating, connecting to official servers with unofficial client builds is prohibited.

== Reception and awards ==
Reception

Aggregate score
Aggregator	Score
Metacritic	64/100

Metacritic rates Ryzom 64/100, indicating "mixed or average" reception. Initial reception ranged from great to mediocre. GameZone rated Ryzom at 8.1, highlighted the innovative skill system, and called Ryzom a "fun game that has some very innovative features", with "good graphics, and great gameplay and concept". GameSpot also acknowledged the novel skill system and friendly community, but rated the game at 5.6 ("mediocre"), being unfinished and needlessly complex. In 2005, the game received the Reader's Choice Award from MMORPG.com for the best game story.

== See also ==
- List of open source games
