= Solstice (2016 video game) =

- Developer: MoaCube
- Publisher: MoaCube
- Programmer: Tom Grochowiak
- Artist: Gracjana Zielinska
- Writers: Hubert Sobecki, Agnieszka Mulak
- Composer: Rob Westwood
- Engine: GameMaker Studio
- Platforms: Windows, MacOS
- Release: February 11, 2016
- Genre: Visual novel
- Mode: Single-player

Solstice is a fantasy, mystery visual novel developed by the Polish indie studio MoaCube and released for Windows and MacOS on February 11, 2016. Set in a city in a remote frozen region that is completely isolated from the world, it revolves around an investigation into the disappearance of an archaeologist. The game received polarized reviews from critics, who praised its art and music, but had mixed opinions of its story.

== Plot ==
The game revolves around the first-person accounts of Galen, a doctor, and Yani, an engineer, who are outsiders sent to investigate a city that is isolated from the world for three months due to harsh cold weather. The city, constructed above hot springs, serves as an oasis, but after Lev, a neurotic archaeologist obsessed with the mysteries behind the city, disappears, betrayals and mechanical failures lead the main characters into a conspiracy that destabilizes the city.

== Gameplay ==
The game is a pure visual novel that progresses in a linear fashion and switches between protagonists at certain points in the story. It allows the player to make choices in response at various times, which may lead to one of four different endings, each with multiple variants. The game does not focus on romance, but includes optional romances, including a same-gender coupling.

== Development ==
The game was developed following the studio's previous release, Cinders. Upon release, the game's developers noted that its sales had mostly shifted to Steam and away from direct sales, resulting in them stating their disappointment about how they are now dependent on Steam.

== Reception ==
Neal Chandran of RPGFan rated the game an 88/100, calling it "another compelling visual novel from MoaCube". Stating that the game has a "twisted storyline, sumptuous graphics and evocative music", he nonetheless criticized "a few instances where the narrative is a little choppy". However, he praised the four separate endings of the game, saying they resulted in "immense replay value".

Ethan Gach of Kill Screen rated the game 66/100. Praising the game for its use of two main characters with unique personalities due to its separate writers, he nevertheless stated that the game's "penchant for playful melodrama and comedic banter" undercut the tension of the story.

Cassandra Khaw of USGamer said that the narrative "feels anything but rote", calling its underlying themes "far darker than what its fairy tale exterior would suggest". She also called the protagonists "some of the most unconventional heroes I've seen in a while". James Monkman of Indie Games Plus called the art "some of the most beautiful I've seen in a visual novel".
