= Stunt Copter =

1986 video game

- Publisher: HomeTown Software
- Designer: Duane Blehm
- Platform: Macintosh
- Release: 1986
- Genre: Action

Stunt Copter is a monochrome Macintosh action game written by Duane Blehm and published by his Kansas-based company, HomeTown Software, in 1986.

== Gameplay ==
The game involves piloting a small helicopter around a playfield. The player has to position the helicopter and drop a person suspended from the aircraft onto a hay bale or moving cart. If incorrectly timed, the person might fall onto the ground or injure the horse or the driver of the cart.

== Legacy ==
After Blehm's death, his parents released his games and source code into the public domain.

MacAddict magazine used Stunt Copter to demonstrate software compatibility of Mac OS X public beta. An OS X version was released by Antell Software.

An iPhone version was released by nerdgames in 2009. In 2011, an iPad version of Stunt Copter was released by Apollo Software which is similar to the original.

In 2018, a collection of his games were uploaded to the Internet Archive and made playable in a web browser.
