= HoverRace =

1996 video game

- Developer: GrokkSoft
- Publisher: GrokkSoft
- Designer: GrokkSoft
- Platform: Windows
- Release: 1996 (shareware); February 7, 1997 (full)
- Genre: Racing video game
- Modes: Single-player, multiplayer

HoverRace is a racing video game created by GrokkSoft in 1996 as shareware. GrokkSoft claimed it was the first internet-based online multiplayer game. The source code was released to the public in 2006 and HoverRace.com maintains a version which is still under active development. License of the source code forbids commercial use.

== Gameplay ==
HoverRace allows players around the world to race against each other in a 3D environment. The player can choose one of four hovercraft before the race begins and competes against others on a track created either by GrokkSoft or by other users. The game supports dial-up connections and does not require a server for races. Up to 10 players can connect directly, but users can go to the in-game chat server called the Internet Meeting Room (IMR) where they can race and chat with others. While racing, players are able to send messages, shoot missiles, drop landmines, and use speed boosters placed in the race track.

In addition, sports tracks have been made. In some of these tracks a stationary player is used as a ball or puck and other players must hit it where they need it to go. Missiles and other items are rarely allowed in these games.

== History ==
=== HoverRace as shareware ===
HoverRace was created in 1996 though there are some pieces of information cached on the internet that suggests it may have origins in 1995. It was designed by GrokkSoft with Richard Langlois as its principal programmer and John Ferber who was responsible for the company's marketing and advertising of the game. In the shareware version of the game users could only race with the basic hovercraft and race three of the company's tracks. Users who bought a registration key for $16 could race with all hovercraft, play any track, and/or even create their own.

To boost popularity, GrokkSoft advertised HoverRace on newsgroups and had a HoverRewards program to pay people who referred new players. GrokkSoft also gained affiliations with MBnet and E-On. The affiliation with E-On was short-lived and as a result the company had to release a new version which removed the E-On (fourth) hovercraft.

In 1998 GrokkSoft stopped selling registration keys. Many players had their own websites with tracks and information about HoverRace. The IMR rooms hosted on GrokkSoft worked until the end of 1999 when GrokkSoft decommissioned the server due to Daniel Young's use of social engineering, where he was able to acquire the source code for the IMR. After the GrokkSoft server went down, the community quickly eroded, and eventually the MBNet IMR went down as well. However, the game was able to live on with Evan Byl hosting the IMR, and a group of others hex editing and resource hacking the game executables. The game was also reviewed by GamePro in 1999. Since 2001, the activity of the HoverRace community has been somewhat sinusoidal; there are periods of long activity followed by relatively quiet times.

=== As orphaned work ===
As there was no official support by the developer anymore, the game-community took up the fixing and patching efforts themselves. The game, hosted by several sites, was hex-edited and resource hacked to enable free use for all users, allowing racing of up to 10 players (instead of 8 as before), to use the illegally acquired IMR, and was modified to allow racing with the E-On craft again. Popular management of the game switched hands many times. Former websites that managed the game include hoverrace.com (whose ownership has switched hands several times as well), hoverrace.ds98.com, and mydan.com.

To compensate for the game's aging graphics and interface, attempts were made to entice new players. Various improvements were made to the stolen IMR source code, while others modernized websites, implemented forums, designed replacement scoreservers, interactive room bots, and controlled versions with cheats, which were all attempts to maintain the number of current players as well as bringing in new ones.

In August 2006, Ryan Curtin received the source code from Richard Langlois, and published it, allowing full public access. The original license, written in 2006, was temporary, expiring in 2009, but in November 2008, Langlois removed the expiration date. The full original source code is still available to the public.

From 2006 to summer 2008, little development was done on the source code. Without an active source code repository and bug-tracking website, and without motivated coders, nothing happened. Then, in summer 2008, a subversion repository was set up and development began. In addition to this version, managed by HoverRace.com, another member of the HoverRace community started HoverRace Plus, intending to fork the original HoverRace source code. HoverRace Plus is now defunct, as a new fork called OpenHover has similar goals, and made an alpha release in December 2008. OpenHover is a fork of HoverRace.com's HoverRace 1.23, with some changes such as chat sounds, various bug fixes, and the distinction between non-registered users, and registered monitors.

2009 saw the release of HoverX, a clone of the original HoverRace. Although fully functional it saw little support from the remaining community and became little more than a demo for its unique low latency engine which is now open source.

=== HoverRace.com ===
In November 2008, HoverRace.com released HoverRace 1.23, based on the original HoverRace source code. A number of improvements were made, including higher supported resolutions (up to 1600x1200), more gameplay options (weapons, mines, and speed cans can be disabled), misspellings were fixed, a revamp of network code for better working with NATs, and several other changes that help make HoverRace playable under Windows Vista and Windows XP without requiring the use of 8-bit color and VPN tools to play online. The current version, 1.23.3, still requires the user to modify router settings to enable port forwarding.

HoverRace.com had plans for HoverRace, including the re-introduction of the E-On craft, more detailed craft meshes, rewritten network code, and several gameplay bug fixes, as well as porting the game to Linux using OpenGL and OpenAL for graphics and audio respectively.

=== HoverNet ===
HoverNet was originally a third party add-on for HoverRace. It offered and extra Internet Meeting room for when the official version of the game was offline, bots, alerts a track downloader and news.

After the original source code was released the developer of HoverNet decided to fork an early version of the HoverRace.com fork of the game as a personal hobby project. This project was originally called Open Hover but later became known as HoverNet NG.
