= Witchaven =

1995 video game

- Cover art by Ken Kelly
- Developer: Capstone Software
- Publisher: Intracorp Entertainment
- Producers: James M. Wheeler; Amy Smith Boyland
- Programmers: Rafael Paiz; Les Bird; Joe Abbati
- Artists: Scott Nixon; Ernesto Roque
- Writer: Mike Pitts
- Composer: Joe Abbati
- Engine: Build
- Platform: MS-DOS
- Release: September 1995
- Genres: First-person shooter, action role-playing
- Modes: Single-player, multiplayer

Witchaven (usually pronounced /ˌwɪtʃˈheɪvən/ wich-HAY-vən) is a dark fantasy first-person shooter video game developed by Capstone Software and published by Intracorp Entertainment in 1995. Its sword-and-sorcery themed story tasks the knight Grondoval with a quest to seek out and destroy a lair of witches in their titular fortress, fighting hordes of hostile monsters along the way. Witchaven features action role-playing elements such as leveling, as well as an emphasis on melee combat. Its code was based upon an early version of the nascent Build engine. The game received overall mixed reviews, such as praise for its atmosphere and gory combat, but criticism for some aspects of gameplay. It was followed by a sequel titled Witchaven II: Blood Vengeance in 1996.

== Gameplay ==
Gameplay screenshot of Witchaven, showing melee combat and the EXP panel.

Although the game is considered a first-person shooter (FPS), the game has several role-playing video game (RPG) elements, including character progression by acquiring experience points (EXP) (gained by defeating enemies and finding gold) and level advancement with an increasing number of hit points, damage modifiers and weapons proficiency, and access to more powerful spells at higher levels. The game also has a focus on close-quarters combat, requiring more tactical thinking, unlike the standard run-and-gun gameplay of most first-person shooters at the time. As a result, Computer Gaming World classified it as an action role-playing game, albeit an unconventional one, while The CRPG Book Project maintained that it "is not a full-fledged RPG - it's a first-person shooter (or rather, hack & slasher) with RPG elements." The game is similar to many FPS games of its era in that the player must look for color-coded keys to open closed doors. There are also options to adjust the game's difficulty and gore levels.

There are eleven weapons in Witchaven, each with a different attack range and other characteristics: bare fists, a dagger, a short sword, a morning star, a broadsword, a battle axe, a bow and arrows, throwing axes, a pike axe, a two-handed longsword and a halberd. With the exception of the fists, weapons will break down with repeated use and replacements must be found in order to continue fighting. The player can also find different types of armor (only one of which may be worn at a time), each with various values of starting armor points, number of armor points that are subtracted with each hit, and chance of deflecting the attack completely. There is also a shield that acts as additional armor with a chance to deflect an attack entirely, while helmets add armor points and also double the damage the player inflicts for a while.

There are several types of scroll-based spells which can be cast by the player, such as the Fireball, Fly, Freeze, Scare, Unlock, and Nuke invocations. The player can drink various potions for restoring health, curing poison status, or gaining supernatural strength (increased damage), invincibility or invisibility for a half minute. Other items are the ankh symbol that gives the player the maximum number of 250 health points, a crystal staff that gives the maximum number of 300 armor points, magic amulets activating invisibility or scare magic for one minute, horns that enable the player to steal the enemies' health points, various magic rings providing different types of protection such as fire resistance, and scepters enabling the player character to walk on either water or lava.

The enemies the player must contend with include goblins, ogres, imps, skeletons, willow wisps and fire drakes. Some of them are prone to fighting against other types of enemies (for instance, rival goblin tribes will attack each other if put in close proximity). Treasure chests can contain wealth or traps. Illwhyrin the witch is the only boss of the game but she appears repeatedly through the game, teleporting away when losing, until the final battle at the 25th level where she can summon monsters; The game ends with her death.

The game also offers a LAN-based deathmatch-style multiplayer mode, with 10 additional multiplayer-only maps. It was made available for up to 16 players, as the first 3D game to feature that many players simultaneously.

== Plot ==
In Witchaven, the player is cast in the role of Grondoval, a hardy knight in service of his homeland Stazhia, been chosen by his master, Lord Verkapheron, for a mission to rid the world of the threat posed by the evil Illwhyrin. In her lair, known as the realm of Witchaven and hidden in a massive subterranean maze under the forbidding Isle of Char, Illwhyrin performs sinister rituals seeking to lift a dimensional barrier, known as the Veil, that separates the game's universe from the chaotic Nether Reaches. If she succeeds, she might access unlimited dark powers to draw upon and gather a vast horde of demonic minions to use as armies for conquest. Grondoval arrives at Char by boat, armed only with a dagger. He needs to fight his way through the hordes of monsters dwelling in a labyrinth of dark caves and dungeons so he can reach Illwhyrin's inner sanctum in time and put an end to her before it is too late.

== Development ==
Witchaven was adapted from Wyrm Works' 1992 tabletop role-playing game supplement Witchaven created by Mike Pitts, who is credited for "original story and maps" in the video game. The concept "violent, first-person action game set in a fantasy universe ruled by a coven of evil witches who must be eradicated from their lairs" was created after the team attended Gen Con '93. The development began in 1994, following the completion of Operation Body Count. At first, the protagonist character was said to be split into two classes for the player to choose: spellcaster or warrior, and an early design called for the player to choose a class and a gender (these features were later seemingly abandoned in favor of a predefined male hero character capable of using both weapons and spells). An early version of the game's story, which was featured in early promotional materials, involved three witches "older than time itself". One advertisement also mentions how "it is rumored that deep beneath dwells the volcano a powerful demon, giving the witches enormous power in return for human sacrifice."

Along with William Shatner's TekWar, also made by Capstone Software in 1995, Witchaven was one of the first games released to use the Build engine, which did not yet allow sloped ceilings and floors, a feature that 3D Realms added later in 1995. The games used a blue-screen technology during the production. Generic enemies are actually clay-made models, first photographed at every angle, then turned into computer sprites; Illwhyrin was played by the game's product manager Judy Melby. In-game weapon models were also created by using digitization, based on the weapons provided by the BlackSword Armoury Inc. Some of the grotesque stoneworks were based on photographs in Stephen King's book Nightmares in the Sky. The game's intro sequence was created by Shadows in Darkness (then known as "Animation Factory") as their first work. Witchaven Official Strategy Guide published by Brady Games features original artwork and behind-the-scenes with the game's creators.

The game's three-level demo version included features that differed from the full version. The demo version only included five weapons to wield and only six spells. Instead of a potion that cured poison, the demo version used an armor potion that increased armor value. Similarly, the fire resistance potion was replaced with a fire walk potion. The demo version's story told of a group of "Death Magic" practicing witches and their plan to activate the volcano of Char that has been dormant for two centuries, causing it to erupt and threaten the surrounding areas, and the yet-unnamed "brave Stazhian" hero's quest was to break this curse by vanquishing them. Although the story changed before the game's release, the sequel still mentions an eruption of the Char's volcano and speaks about the destruction of plural "witches in their wretched lair" while telling the game's backstory; similarly, the official website includes the phrase the "Witches of Char" in its description of the game.

== Reception ==
Reception

Review scores
Publication	Score
Computer Gaming World	2.5/5
GameSpot	5.3/10

Witchaven was met with a mixed critical reception. Nevertheless, the sales were satisfactory enough to create a sequel.

PC Zone gave Witchaven a score of 88/100 and recommended it as "packed with lots of spells and potions to play with, the usual network/modem options, triggers and traps, impressive graphical effects - and if you're looking for gore you've found it. Sick, twisted and violent - we like it." Lim Choon Wee of New Straits Times wrote "I love Witchaven," especially praising the game's "bewitching" graphics. Polish magazines Gambler and Top Secret gave it their overall review scores of 90% and 29/40, respectively. In Germany, Power Play gave it two scores of 71% each for both single-player and multiplayer modes, while PC Player scored it a 74%. Other positive reception included a 79 from Spain's Micromanía and a 90% from Slovenia's Svet Kompjutera.

On the other hand, Petra Schlunk of Computer Gaming World described the game "less than spellbounding" despite the "eye-popping gore and a few cosmetic RPG elements" and very disappointing for its lack of real gameplay immersion, concluding it to be "just another" Doom clone. According to Jim Varner of GameSpot, "Witchaven is certainly not a bad game, but it's not that great either," as "in-your-face combat is novel at first, but after a few hours of play, you'll be praying for a BFG-9000."

== Legacy ==
In a direct sequel titled Witchaven II: Blood Vengeance, released in 1996, Grondoval's enemy is the slain witch's vindictive sister. The gameplay of Witchaven II is based on its predecessor, the only differences being in some additional weapon selection and enemy variance.

A third game in the series was briefly considered, possibly to keep with the original game's ending text premise of Grondoval eventually becoming a king, (Note: "With the death of Illwhyrin the rift between the Realm and Nether Reaches collapsed. Lord Verkapheron returned triumphantly to redeem his place as a champion and keeper of Char. The scattered remains of the witch's minions fell swiftly under Verkapheron's legions and peace was restored. Grondoval was given a hero's welcome, and his further adventures eventually led him to his own land; his own kingdom. ...But that is another story.") but Intracorp bankrupted and Capstone was shut down before any work on it started. The game was scheduled to be made after Corridor 8, which was never finished.

Around 2006, a former Capstone programmer Les Bird released the source code of Witchaven and Witchaven II; the derived EGwhaven patches were included in the game's Steam and GOG.com re-releases. The game is supported by the BuildGDX source port, as well as JFWitchaven.

In addition, a black metal band Witchaven took its name from the series, and Techland's video game Hellraid was described as a spiritual successor to Witchaven and Hexen. The indie game Arthurian Legends has been compared to Witchaven.
