= The Cardinal of the Kremlin (video game) =

1991 simulation video game

- Developer(s): Capstone Software
- Publisher(s): IntraCorp; Accolade
- Platform(s): Amiga, MS-DOS
- Release: 1991
- Genre(s): Government simulation
- Mode(s): Single-player

The Cardinal of the Kremlin is a 1991 video game based on the 1988 Tom Clancy novel of the same name. It was developed by Capstone Software and published by IntraCorp for Amiga and MS-DOS.

== Gameplay ==
The Cardinal of the Kremlin is a global management simulation.

== Reception ==
Allen L. Greenberg reviewed the game for Computer Gaming World, and stated that "The Cardinal of the Kremlin is an unconventional game to learn. If it is possible to imagine an office overseer examining bar graphs, studying trends and rapidly making decisions on the fly, one can easily imagine the flow of game play in Cardinal. Fans of Tom Clancy's novel will find that the programmers have made a genuine effort to convert the book to a game, which is by no means completely marred by the program's less than sterling presentation. Cardinal is also recommended for those who have always wanted to rule the world by the power of red tape rather than pure destruction."

In a 1994 survey of wargames, Computer Gaming World gave the title one-plus stars out of five, stating that it "utilized intensive bar graphs as a replacement for action and entertainment".

In 1996, Computer Gaming World declared Cardinal of the Kremlin the 36th-worst computer game ever released.
