= Bombshell (video game) =

2016 video game

- Developer: Interceptor Entertainment
- Publisher: 3D Realms
- Director: Frederik Schreiber
- Producer: Khaled Ibrahimi
- Designers: Daniel Hedjazi; Leon Zawada; Vitaliy Bondarenko; Jacob Ostergaard; Paulo Rosa
- Programmer: Grzegorz Zawadzki
- Artists: Chris Pollitt; Simon Rance; Arturo Pahua
- Writer: Adam Meadows
- Composer: Andrew Hulshult
- Engine: Unreal Engine 3
- Platform: Windows
- Release: WW: January 29, 2016
- Genre: Multidirectional shooter
- Mode: Single-player

Bombshell is a multidirectional shooter developed by Interceptor Entertainment and published by 3D Realms. The game was released on January 29, 2016, for Microsoft Windows. The game runs on Unreal Engine 3.

== Plot ==
The game allows the player to control Shelly "Bombshell" Harrison, a colonel in the Global Defense Force. Her career is abruptly brought to an end after an event titled "the Washington Incident", which caused her to lose her arm and her team. Harrison is then offered a new contract by a private military contractor and offered a second chance and a new mechanical arm.

== Development ==
The game was conceived during Gearbox Software's lawsuit against Interceptor regarding the video game Duke Nukem: Mass Destruction, as they did not authorize any new development. Interceptor was working on the game for the PlayStation 4 and Microsoft Windows; however, due to a lawsuit by Gearbox Software, who owns the right to the Duke Nukem franchise, the game's name was changed to Bombshell and the main character was changed to Shelly Harrison, who was originally meant to play a supporting role in the Duke Nukem game.

In April 2014, a website NoGumNeeded.com was launched by Interceptor Entertainment that showed a countdown. The game was revealed with the title Bombshell in development for Microsoft Windows and PlayStation 4 on May 14, 2014, along with a trailer, and was scheduled to be released in 2015. Some details about the gameplay and the protagonist Shelly "Bombshell" Harrison were revealed in the announcement. It was also announced that the game utilised the Unreal Engine and it will launch with modding tools. Due to the negative reception to the trailer, 3D Realms started the development of the game from scratch. The gameplay trailer was released on March 2, 2015, during Game Developers Conference. The E3 2015 trailer was released on June 25, 2015. On July 23, a ten-minute long video showing gameplay of the game was released during QuakeCon 2015. On August 27, a game trailer of the boss battle against "Zeroth Guardian" was released during PAX Prime 2015.

In January 2016, the game's voice cast was announced, including Valerie Arem as Bombshell and Duke Nukem voice actor Jon St. John as Professor Jadus Heskel. The release of the Windows version of the game was delayed to January 29, 2016, so as to give additional time for the developer to fix bugs.

== Reception ==
Bombshell has a score of 44% on Metacritic. IGN rated the game 6.9 out of 10, saying the game "is a fast-paced, energetic, deliberately absurd action shooter that's mostly competent at everything it tries to do". GameSpot awarded it a score of 2.0 out of 10, calling it a "buggy, bland game with some of the worst writing you're likely to hear in some time." Hardcore Gamer rated the game a 2 out of 5, saying "What once began as something that had potential to become a so-stupid-it's-awesome classic ended up being merely... well, it isn't even really that stupid as a whole, just dull." PC Gamer awarded it 30%, saying "An [action role-playing game] with weak combat and too many bugs, Bombshell isn't worth your click-click-clicks." Leo Espada of GoneWithTheWin rated it 6/10 and stated, "Bombshell features a solid core of combat mechanics, visual design, and a genius soundtrack. It is light on the RPG side, with little depth to sink your teeth into".

== Legacy ==
A prequel for Harrison's story, entitled Ion Fury, was developed by Voidpoint and released in 2019 by 3D Realms. It uses an updated version of the original Build engine. Harrison will also appear in the upcoming game Phantom Fury. This game serves as sequel to Ion Fury and it is developed by Slipgate Ironworks (the new name of Interceptor Entertainment). Tempest Rising is a real-time strategy video game developed by Slipgate Ironworks and 2B Games, and published by 3D Realms and Knights Peak, that is set in the same universe as Bombshell, and begins around 100 years before the events of Ion Fury.
