= Computerized Coloring Books =

- Box art of "The FernGully Computerized Coloring Book"
- Genre: Art tool
- Developer: Capstone Software
- Publisher: IntraCorp
- Platforms: MS-DOS, Amiga
- Original release: 1992

Computerized Coloring Books is a collection of three games developed by Capstone Software and published by its parent company IntraCorp for MS-DOS and Amiga. A port for Windows 3.1 was planned but never released. The games are based on Bill Kroyer's film FernGully: The Last Rainforest, Don Bluth's film Rock-a-Doodle, and John Hughes's film Home Alone. The Rock-a-Doodle game was as released with Trolls and An American Tail: The Computer Adventures of Fievel and His Friends on the Capstone CD Game Kids Collection.

== Gameplay ==
The games work as basic computerized coloring books, which require the player to fill in a line art picture. There are 16 colors available, which can be mixed for up to 256 colors. The player can choose from a selection of backgrounds and add any characters to the picture, both of which are based on scenes and characters of the respective films. The products support a wide range of printers, including dot matrix, color and laser printers.

== Promotion ==
The FernGully game was designed to follow an environmentally friendly policy, by optionally using a computer instead of consumable paper, and using recycled paper. A coloring contest accompanied the product launch, including entry forms, for a $100 prize.
