= WWII GI =

1999 video game

- Developer: TNT Team
- Publisher: GT Interactive
- Engine: Build
- Platform: MS-DOS
- Release: March 15, 1999
- Genre: First-person shooter
- Modes: Single-player, multiplayer

WWII GI is a first-person shooter video game set during the events of World War II. Developed by TNT Team and published by GT Interactive, the game was released in 1999 as the direct sequel to NAM, which was released the year prior. WWII GI was the last commercially released game to use the Build engine until the release of Ion Fury in 2019. The player takes control of 101st Airborne Division G.I. Corporal Gerardi, sent in to wipe out scores of Wehrmacht and Schutzstaffel soldiers. WWII GI was later re-released on Steam on November 13, 2015, with Retroism and Night Dive Studios as the publishers.

== Gameplay ==
The game sets the player in the middle of World War II scenarios such as the D-Day beach landings during the invasion of Normandy, assaults on equipment and supply depots, and other scenarios. The game consists of 30 levels divided into four episodes; there are two single-player episodes with seven levels in each episode and two multiplayer episodes with eight levels in each episode. The game was built using the Build engine, with 3D environments and 2D character sprites. It shared similar gameplay elements to its predecessor, NAM.

== Reception ==
Reception

Aggregate score
Aggregator	Score
GameRankings	51%

Review scores
Publication	Score
CNET Gamecenter	3/10
Computer Games Strategy Plus	2.5/5
GamePro	3.5/5
IGN	3.2/10

The game received "mixed" reviews according to the review aggregation website GameRankings. IGN felt that the game was not keeping up with the rest of the market and was using an outdated engine and was too obsolete.
