= Discoveries of the Deep =

1993 video game

- Developer: Capstone Software
- Publishers: Capstone Software; GameTek UK Ltd. Ziggurat Interactive (2021)
- Platform: MS-DOS
- Genre: Educational
- Mode: Single-player

Discoveries of the Deep is a 1993 edutainment game developed by Capstone Software, originally published by GameTek UK and later re-released by Ziggurat Interactive. In Discoveries, players control ships and submarines to explore the sea and discover lost treasures and other sunken vessels. The game is an updated and expanded successor to Capstone's previous Search for the Titanic.

Discoveries has received mixed reviews. Compared to Search for the Titanic, reviewers believed Discoveries was "much improved" and "vastly better." The reviewers of Computer Game Review stated it had "good ideas but poor execution," including frustrating technical problems and a lack of expected functionality (such as the ability for the player to save their game).
