= Tempest Rising =

2025 video game

- Steam header
- Developers: Slipgate Ironworks; 2B Games
- Publishers: 3D Realms; Knights Peak
- Director: Frederik Schreiber
- Producer: Malthe Jensen
- Designer: Brandon Casteel
- Composer: Frank Klepacki
- Engine: Unreal Engine 5
- Platform: Windows
- Release: April 17, 2025
- Genre: Real-time strategy
- Modes: Single-player, multiplayer

Tempest Rising is a 2025 real-time strategy video game developed by Slipgate Ironworks and 2B Games, and published by 3D Realms and Knights Peak.

== Gameplay ==
Tempest Rising is a real-time strategy game reminiscent of the Command & Conquer series, in which players gather resources, build up bases, and field armies to defeat opposing human or AI players.

Tempest Rising features three game modes: Single-player campaign, single-player skirmish, and multiplayer. The campaign allows players to augment their forces before a mission, and learn more about the lore of Tempest Rising from the officers briefing them. Multiplayer and skirmish modes allow players to engage against human and AI opponents respectively, over a variety of maps.

The player may play with or against one of the following three factions:

- The Global Defense Force (GDF) specializes in mobilized and positional combat. It relies on two forms of technology to provide advantages against opposing forces.
- The Tempest Dynasty specializes in brute force strategies. It can adopt one of three "Plans" to provide combat bonuses, upgrade structures to gain additional abilities alongside accessing higher-tier units, and overwork Power Plants to improve unit production and defensive structures.
- The Veti is an advanced alien race. This faction was not playable at launch and could only be fought in the single-player campaign. In 2026, it became available in multiplayer and skirmish modes. A DLC, "The Veti's Wrath", released on 29 September 2026, adds a Veti single-player campaign.

Base construction uses a similar structure to Command & Conquer, in that players need to unpack a Mobile Construction Vehicle (MCV) to establish a base and construct additional structures. Production structures, such as factories and airfields, produce new units. Tech structures, such as the Data Core, unlock advanced units, support powers, and defenses. Other structures defend the base, gather and store resources, repair units, or supply the much-required electric power. All structures are placed in a grid layout and could be rotated before placement.

The UI divides units into three categories: infantry, vehicles, and aircraft, each with their own strengths and weaknesses, along with special abilities for use in combat. Each faction also has access to powerful Specialist units, of which only one can be trained.

The primary resource in this game is Tempest, which is reminiscent of Tiberium from the Command & Conquer series. The GDF and the Dynasty send harvesters to Tempest fields to collect Tempest pods and deliver them to their local refineries, rewarding the player with cash. The Veti uses Refinement Altars built directly upon Tempest fields to directly extract resources from the field without harvesting and depleting the field. Tempest fields are dangerous to most ground vehicles but not to infantry. The GDF generates and consumes a secondary resource called Intel.

Also absent from the game at launch were super-weapons, buildings capable of unleashing devastation anywhere on the map. They were added in a later update in December 2025. Each faction can only build one. Super-weapons are costly and have a significant warm-up time before they can fire.

== Synopsis ==
=== Setting and characters ===
Tempest Rising is set in the same universe as Bombshell and begins around 100 years before the events of Ion Fury.

Tempest Rising is set in 1997, in an alternate version of history in which the Cuban Missile Crisis of 1962 was not resolved peacefully. Exacerbated diplomatic tensions from this event led to a Third World War, where the use of nuclear weapons led to significant areas of the Earth being irradiated. Shortly afterward, fissures opened up in irradiated regions, from which the virulent, vine-like Tempest emerged, initially frightening the human populace. Soon, however, scientists discovered that Tempest vines, leaves, and pods carry abundances of "voltaic" energy, which could serve as means of rebuilding civilization and contending with the energy crisis. Scientific consensus holds that, despite its vine-like appearance, Tempest is neither a plant nor even eukaryotic.

In the wake of the Tempest emergence, the Eastern European and Asian nations, which were struggling with nuclear fallout, formed the Tempest Dynasty, a union that owned the majority of the world's Tempest deposits. They view Tempest as not merely a birthright, but a divine gift bestowed upon them as restitutions for their loss. Meanwhile, a coalition of the surviving Western governments formed the Global Defense Force (GDF) and seek to regulate the world's Tempest reserves as a means of gaining peace through power. This resulted in a global conflict between the two factions over a period of three decades, which culminates in the invasion of the Veti, a malevolent alien race.

The GDF is led by a secretive Council of Directors who keep their faces hidden and their voices scrambled. Undersecretary Jacob Greene directly serves the council as a politician. The GDF's senior military commander in the European theater is Colonel Robert Fisher, who disapproves the council's political agendas. Their Tempest research is headed by Dr. Lyssa Francis. In appearance, GDF resembles the modern-day NATO forces. The faction uses advanced technology to make up for its lack of manpower. The GDF appears in prior video games. It is the supporting faction in Bombshell, the protagonist in Ion Fury, and the antagonist in Phantom Fury. Their corrupt image in this game is consistent with that of Phantom Fury.

The Dynasty is led by Domovoy Molchalin, the alliance's founder whose neurological health has declined, requiring specialized implants to be able to communicate. He operates is abject secrecy, leading the GDF to doubt he is alive. The Dynasty military is led by his son Aleks. Serving them is the chief intelligence officer, Lieutenant Jelena Melnik. The Dynasty relies on abundance of manpower to make up for its lack of high technology. Dynasty characters are often savage, rough, and blunt (especially Aleks, whose public image is that of a sadist), but are devoid of malice.

The Veti is an alien race that was responsible for creating the Tempest. They arrived on Earth ten thousand years ago, when they lost a war with humanity and have been in hibernation ever since. They primarily seek to reconquer the Earth and subjugate humanity under their rule. They are primarily led by an elite field commander known as a Nacom, who is supported by an intelligent construct named the Reclaimant. All Veti on Earth are as of currently lead by a warmaster known as Huracán.

=== Plot ===
In 1997, a Tempest Dynasty excavation in Iraq uncovers an ancient object that is not human in origin. The discovery is passed on to the Dynasty's founder, Domovoy Molchalin. Meanwhile, in Europe, his son Aleks orders his new Dynasty General to counter GDF forces within the Dynasty's territories in Eastern Europe. At the same time, GDF officer Colonel Fisher assigns a new GDF Commander to counter efforts by the Dynasty to hit their Tempest operations in Iceland, and later investigate their plans, leading to a major defense of a GDF position in Germany. During their operations, Domovoy secretly contacts the Dynasty General and reveals his concerns about the existence of a secret society called the Hawthorne Initiative. He believes the society knew about Tempest before it emerged in the wake of the nuclear war of the 1960s.

Eventually, the Council of Directors orders GDF forces, led by the GDF Commander, to take over the Dynasty's excavation site in Iraq and protect their team of archaeologists sent to investigate the site. Domovoy, learning of this, orders the Dynasty General to transport a nuclear warhead to the site and detonate it underground, stating it will invite an "enemy of humanity". The GDF manage to gather enough information before withdrawing, moments before the warhead detonates. In the wake of the blast, both sides witness the emergence of an alien force called the Veti, which indiscriminately attacks the GDF and Dynasty, spreading out quickly.

Scientists from both sides determine the Veti were responsible for the creation of the Tempest. While the GDF mount attacks to counter the spread of the Veti, Domovoy uses the alien force to help eradicate members of the Hawthorne Initiative from the Dynasty's ranks and go into hiding, by luring them to destroy the Dynasty's command center at Sofia. He orders a Veti temple in Milan to be captured to secure its secrets. The GDF ultimately captures a Dynasty missile silo in Murcia to uses it to fire an experimental anti-Tempest missile against the Veti's main headquarters. The missile disables or destroys Veti machinery worldwide, while leaves their infantry in a vegetative state.

In the aftermath of the conflict, Fisher commends the GDF Commander for their actions, though warns the Veti will likely return, while the Council privately contacts them with an offer. Meanwhile, Domovoy commends the Dynasty General for their efforts, hoping the data they stole from the Veti can help rebuild the Dynasty, though Aleks later privately contacts them to express distrust over his father's machinations in the shadows.

=== The Veti's Wrath DLC ===
Following the events of the main story, it's revealed that the detonation of the nuclear warhead by Domovoy had unintentionally weakened the prison relic of an infamous Veti warlord, K'uhul the Immutable, whom also turned on his people and was imprisoned after attempting to take over almost twenty Veti worlds. Reawakened by the warhead as well, the reigning Nacom is directed by Huracán to gather forces and locate and siege the location where K'uhul's prison is stored. Forced to sacrifice his corporeal form, Huracán reactivates a War Ender machine to destroy the prison, seemingly killing K'uhul permanently. However, after Huracán reactivates the Veti Tempest network, K'uhul reveals himself to have been alive all along and usurps all of Huracán's and the Nacom's forces.

Determined to restart his campaign of conquest, K'uhul attempts to reacquire the activation sequences for the Veti World Gates, but is disrupted by a rogue Dynasty-splinter faction known as Talon, which forces him to resort to mentally probing the leading GDF scientist, Dr. Francis, to death. Meanwhile, the Reclaimant feigns obedience to K'uhul while attempting to use GDF top secret research to both free itself and the Nacom from K'uhul's grasp, but K'uhul rapidly catches on to the Reclaimant's plans and attempts to dispose of both it and the Nacom, although both survive.

The Reclaimant and Nacom are contacted by Domovoy whom offers them a deal: help him be rid of Talon, and they will recover a critical component and obtain the resources required to assemble a superweapon needed to kill K'uhul, which is transferred to Kyoto. In spite of attempted GDF interference, the weapon is assembled as Huracán covertly contacts the Nacom, informing that once K'uhul opens the World Gates, he will also be able to usurp other Veti armies and thus become unstoppable. The Reclaimant and Nacom engage K'uhul's forces at the Bermuda Triangle where they unsuccessfully attempt to release Huracán via the weapon.

With few options left, the Reclaimant and Nacom use the World Gates to escape to the Moon, where the Reclaimant awakes the Celestial Guard, an ancient Veti army stationed there, from their slumber. Forced into a series of trials, the Nacom wins over control of the Celestial Guard and uses them to finally destroy K'uhul, returning Huracán to his mortal form as well. Amused by the result, Domovoy offers an alliance with Huracán to help excise the remainders of Talon and Hawthorne from the Dynasty forces in exchange to reclaiming whatever Huracán desires, to which Huracán replies: "Everything".

== Development ==
Developer Slipgate Ironworks is based in Denmark. THQ Nordic announced Tempest Rising in August 2022. A playable demo of the game was released in the following year.

Tempest Rising was announced to be released on April 24, 2025, with advanced access for purchasers of the Deluxe Edition on April 17, 2025. However, due to a publishing error purchasers of the standard edition of the game also received access, and the following day the publishers retroactively declared April 17 the release day rather than correct the error.

== Reception ==
Tempest Rising received "generally favorable" reviews from critics, according to the review aggregation website Metacritic.

The game was nominated for Best Sim/Strategy Game at The Game Awards 2025.
