= Capstone Software =

American video game developer

- Industry: Video games
- Founded: 1984
- Defunct: 1996
- Headquarters: Miami, Florida, U.S.
- Key people: Leigh Rothschild, David Turner, Amy Smith-Boylan, James M. Wheeler
- Parent: IntraCorp

Capstone Software was a subsidiary of IntraCorp, a Miami-based computer and video game company. Founded in 1984, Capstone created first-person games such as Corridor 7: Alien Invasion, Operation Body Count, William Shatner's TekWar and Witchaven, and is also known for releasing games based on movie/TV licenses. Capstone's first-person games used the Wolfenstein 3D engine, and later, the Build engine.

IntraCorp went bankrupt in 1996 and shut down all its operations, including Capstone Software. Capstone's last game, Corridor 8: Galactic Wars, never left the prototype stage and was never released. Capstone became VRTech, providing first-person buildouts of new construction condominiums using the Build engine. It eventually closed down.

== Games ==
The following is a list of games developed and/or published by Capstone Software as well its parent company Intracorp.

=== Intracorp ===
Game	Details
Search for the Titanic Original release date: February 1989	Release years by system: 1989 – MS-DOS, Commodore 64
Search for the Titanic Original release date: February 1989	Notes: Simulation video game; Co-developed by Codesmiths; Published by Capstone Software
The Big Deal Original release date: 1991	Release years by system: 1991 – MS-DOS, Amiga
The Big Deal Original release date: 1991	Notes: Gambling video game; Co-developed by ComputerEasy and Software Toolworks; Published by Capstone Software and Accolade, Inc.; The MS-DOS version compiles the games Ante Up, Cribbage King / Gin King and Trump Castle: The Ultimate Casino Gambling Simulation; The Amiga version compiles the games The Chessmaster 2000, Cribbage King / Gin King and Trump Castle: The Ultimate Casino Gambling Simulation
Bridge Master Original release date: 1992	Release years by system: 1992 – MS-DOS; 1993 – Mac OS
Bridge Master Original release date: 1992	Notes: Card games; Published by Capstone Software; Remade as Bridge Master Championship Edition in 1993 for Windows 3.x and MacOS
Terminator 2: Judgment Day - Chess Wars Original release date: 1993	Release years by system: 1993 – MS-DOS
Terminator 2: Judgment Day - Chess Wars Original release date: 1993	Notes: Chess game; Published by Capstone Software; Working title was Terminator 2 - Cyber Chess; Uses the Grandmaster Chess engine

=== Capstone Software ===
Game	Details
Trump Castle: The Ultimate Casino Gambling Simulation Original release date: 1988	Release years by system: 1988 – MS-DOS, Commodore 64; 1989 – Amiga, Atari ST
Trump Castle: The Ultimate Casino Gambling Simulation Original release date: 1988	Notes: Gambling video game; Self-published by Capstone Software; Part of the Trump Castle series
Miami Vice Original release date: 1989	Release years by system: 1989 – MS-DOS, Atari ST
Miami Vice Original release date: 1989	Notes: Platformer; Self-published by Capstone Software; Based on the Miami Vice franchise
Cardinal of the Kremlin Original release date: March 4, 1990	Release years by system: 1990 – MS-DOS; 1991 – Amiga
Cardinal of the Kremlin Original release date: March 4, 1990	Notes: Government simulation game; Published by Intracorp; Based on Tom Clancy's novel of the same name
Lots-O-$lot$ Original release date: 1991	Release years by system: 1991 – MS-DOS
Lots-O-$lot$ Original release date: 1991	Notes: Serves as an add-on program for the MS-DOS versions of Trump Castle: The Ultimate Casino Gambling Simulation, The Big Deal and Trump Castle II
Exotic Car Showroom Original release date: 1992	Release years by system: 1992 – MS-DOS
Exotic Car Showroom Original release date: 1992	Notes: Business simulation game; Self-published by Capstone Software
Grandmaster Chess Original release date: 1992	Release years by system: 1992 – MS-DOS; 1995 – Mac OS
Grandmaster Chess Original release date: 1992	Notes: Chess game; Self-published by Capstone Software; Re-released on CD for MS-DOS in 1993
Computerized Coloring Books Original release date: 1992	Release years by system: 1992 – MS-DOS, Amiga
Computerized Coloring Books Original release date: 1992	Notes: Art tool; Based on the FernGully, Home Alone and Rock-A-Doodle franchises; Windows 3.x port was planned but never released
Trump Castle 3 Original release date: 1993	Release years by system: 1993 – MS-DOS
Trump Castle 3 Original release date: 1993	Notes: Gambling video game; Self-published by Capstone Software; Part of the Trump Castle series
Operation Body Count Original release date: March 1994	Release years by system: 1994 – MS-DOS
Operation Body Count Original release date: March 1994	Notes: First-person shooter; Self-published by Capstone Software; Uses Wolfenstein 3D engine
Corridor 7: Alien Invasion Original release date: March 1, 1994	Release years by system: 1994 – MS-DOS
Corridor 7: Alien Invasion Original release date: March 1, 1994	Notes: First-person shooter; Self-published by Capstone Software; Uses Wolfenstein 3D engine
Zorro Original release date: March 14, 1995	Release years by system: 1995 – MS-DOS
Zorro Original release date: March 14, 1995	Notes: Platformer; Self-published by Capstone Software
Witchaven Original release date: September 30, 1995	Release years by system: 1995 – MS-DOS
Witchaven Original release date: September 30, 1995	Notes: First-person shooter; Published by Intracorp; Uses Build engine
William Shatner's TekWar Original release date: October 1995	Release years by system: 1995 – MS-DOS
William Shatner's TekWar Original release date: October 1995	Notes: First-person shooter; Self-published by Capstone Software; Uses Build engine
Casino Tournament of Champions Original release date: 1995	Release years by system: 1995 – MS-DOS
Casino Tournament of Champions Original release date: 1995	Notes: Gambling video game; Self-published by Capstone Software
Witchaven II: Blood Vengeance Original release date: May 6, 1996	Release years by system: 1996 – MS-DOS
Witchaven II: Blood Vengeance Original release date: May 6, 1996	Notes: First-person shooter; Published by Intracorp; Sequel to Witchaven; Uses Build engine

=== Published ===
Game	Details
Bill & Ted's Excellent Adventure Original release date: 1989	Release years by system: 1990 – Commodore 64; 1990 – MS-DOS; 1991 – Amiga
Bill & Ted's Excellent Adventure Original release date: 1989	Notes: Adventure game; Developed by Off The Wall Productions
Trump Castle 2 Original release date: 1991	Release years by system: 1991 – MS-DOS, Amiga
Trump Castle 2 Original release date: 1991	Notes: Gambling video game; Developed by Brian A. Rice; Part of the Trump Castle series
Taking of Beverly Hills Original release date: 1991	Release years by system: 1991 – MS-DOS
Taking of Beverly Hills Original release date: 1991	Notes: Action / Adventure game; Developed by Off The Wall Productions
Home Alone Original release date: 1991	Release years by system: 1991 – MS-DOS, Amiga
Home Alone Original release date: 1991	Notes: Platformer; Developed by Manley & Associates; Based on the Home Alone film
Monte Carlo Baccarat Original release date: 1991	Release years by system: 1991 – MS-DOS
Monte Carlo Baccarat Original release date: 1991	Notes: Gambling video game; Developed by Brian A. Rice
Home Alone 2: Lost in New York Original release date: 1992	Release years by system: 1992 – MS-DOS
Home Alone 2: Lost in New York Original release date: 1992	Notes: Platformer; Developed by Manley & Associates; Based on the Home Alone 2: Lost in New York film
L.A. Law Original release date: 1992	Release years by system: 1992 – MS-DOS
L.A. Law Original release date: 1992	Notes: Adventure game; Developed by Synergistic Software; Based on the L.A. Law TV show
The Dark Half Original release date: 1992	Release years by system: 1992 – MS-DOS
The Dark Half Original release date: 1992	Notes: Adventure game; Developed by Symtus; Based on The Dark Half film
An American Tail: The Computer Adventures of Fievel and His Friends Original release date: August 1992	Release years by system: 1992 – MS-DOS
An American Tail: The Computer Adventures of Fievel and His Friends Original release date: August 1992	Notes: Adventure game; Developed by Manley & Associates; Based on An American Tail franchise
Wayne's World Original release date: 1993	Release years by system: 1993 – MS-DOS
Wayne's World Original release date: 1993	Notes: Adventure game; Developed by Robert Fiorini & Associates
Homey D. Clown Original release date: 1993	Release years by system: 1993 – MS-DOS
Homey D. Clown Original release date: 1993	Notes: Action game; Developed by Synergistic Software
The Beverly Hillbillies Original release date: 1993	Release years by system: 1993 – MS-DOS
The Beverly Hillbillies Original release date: 1993	Notes: Adventure game; Developed by Synergistic Software
Discoveries of the Deep Original release date: 1993	Release years by system: 1993 – MS-DOS
Discoveries of the Deep Original release date: 1993	Notes: Adventure game; Developed by GameTek
Surf Ninjas Original release date: 1994	Release years by system: 1994 – MS-DOS, Amiga, Amiga CD32
Surf Ninjas Original release date: 1994	Notes: Beat 'em up game; Developed by Creative Edge Software
Ultimate Backgammon Original release date: 1994	Release years by system: 1994 – MS-DOS
Ultimate Backgammon Original release date: 1994	Notes: Board game; Developed by Sentient Software
Anyone for Cards? Original release date: 1994	Release years by system: 1994 – MS-DOS, Windows 3.x, Mac OS
Anyone for Cards? Original release date: 1994	Notes: Card games; Developed by Random Programming
Chronomaster Original release date: December 20, 1995	Release years by system: 1995 – MS-DOS
Chronomaster Original release date: December 20, 1995	Notes: Adventure game; Developed by DreamForge Intertainment

=== Distributed ===
- Eternam
- Pinball Arcade
- Superman: The Man of Steel
- Trolls

=== Cancelled ===
Title	Cancellation date	Developer(s)	Ref(s).
Rescue 911	1994	Capstone Software	
Flintstones vs. The Jetsons Chess	1994	Capstone Software	
Corridor 8: Galactic Wars	1996	Capstone Software	
Fate	1996	Capstone Software	
