= Trump Castle (series) =

- Original game cover (1989)
- Genre(s): Gambling
- Publisher(s): Capstone Software
- Platform(s): Amiga, Atari ST, Commodore 64, Commodore 128, MS-DOS
- First release: Trump Castle: The Ultimate Casino Gambling Simulation; 1989
- Latest release: Trump Castle 3; 1993

Trump Castle is a series of gambling video games published by Capstone Software between 1989 and 1993. The games are named after Trump's Castle hotel-casino in Atlantic City, New Jersey, and were released for Amiga, Atari ST, Commodore 64, Commodore 128, and MS-DOS.

== Games ==
Each of the games were published by Capstone Software, a division of IntraCorp.

=== Trump Castle (1989) ===
Trump Castle: The Ultimate Casino Gambling Simulation was released in 1989, for Amiga, Apple II, Atari ST, Commodore 64, Commodore 128, and MS-DOS. In the United Kingdom, the game was released in February 1990. In 1991, the game was republished by Capstone along with two non-gambling games as a compilation titled The Big Deal. Trump Castle was also republished by Capstone as Casinos of the World, a 1992 compilation that included two other gambling games.

The game is set at Trump's Castle hotel-casino in Atlantic City, New Jersey, and includes six different gambling games: blackjack, craps, keno, roulette, video poker, and nine distinct slot machines. Each of the games follow the rules and regulations established by the New Jersey Casino Control Commission, except for keno, which, in reality, was not available in New Jersey casinos. The Trump Castle logo is featured onscreen during each of the gambling games. The game manual includes a shortened version of Trump Castle's Guide to Gambling, which explains the rules of blackjack, craps, and roulette. The game also includes coupons for the real Trump Castle.

IntraCorp unveiled the game at the Winter Consumer Electronics Show in January 1989. It was the first software game associated with Donald Trump, and was the first game to be released by Capstone. The game was intended to promote the Trump's Castle resort. Roger Wagner, the president of Trump's Castle, said, "We always like to keep our name, our logo or our picture out there in front of the consumer. Some of the people who buy the software may never have been in Atlantic City. After they see the picture of the Castle and try their hand at the games they might come here and try the real thing."

L.R. Shannon of The New York Times called it an "entertaining and educational" program, while South Bend Tribune noted issues with installing the game. Scott Mace of inCider praised the game: "To use one of Donald Trump's favorite words, this game is quality." Daniel Heneghan of The Press of Atlantic City wrote that the graphics "aren't the 'ultimate' and the different commands needed to run the different games can be confusing, but they do offer a reasonable simulation of the games."

Andrew Baartz of The Australian Commodore and Amiga Review considered the game addictive and praised its realism, calling it the "finest" gambling simulation available. .info rated the game two out of five stars and criticized the graphics, sound effects, and the lack of options, and called it "easily the worst " gambling simulation ever released for the Amiga. The magazine stated that the game lacked realism, noting that the reels of the slot machine games spin up rather than down. Bob Guerra of Run criticized the game for poor graphics, animation, and sound effects, and stated that the slot machines did not look realistic. He praised the graphics of the roulette wheel, but otherwise considered the overall game to be "far from ultimate." Alan Emrich of Computer Gaming World also felt that the game fell short of its goal to be the ultimate gambling simulation, and stated that other computer programs, focusing on individual gambling games, did a better job of recreating the experience.

=== Trump Castle II (1991) ===
Trump Castle II was released in 1991, for Amiga and MS-DOS. The game includes baccarat, blackjack, craps, roulette, slots, and video poker, all following the rules of the New Jersey Casino Control Commission. The player is initially given $1,000 to play the various games. The player begins in the lobby of Trump Castle, and uses a point-and-click interface to navigate toward the gambling games or to other parts of the resort, including a hotel suite, the pool, and a restaurant; these areas, represented by digitized images of the real resort, include characters who make comments through popup speech balloons. The game also features a multiplayer option. Included with the game was the Trump Castle Gaming Guide, which is also used by the player to bypass the game's copy protection. Also included was a coupon for a one-night stay at Trump Castle's hotel. Capstone released two standalone add-on disks, Poker and Lots-O-$lot$, which were also compatible with Trump Castle II and its predecessor.

Trump Castle II and its predecessor were both successful, leading Capstone to publish a sequel.

=== Trump Castle 3 (1993) ===
Trump Castle 3 was released in 1993, for DOS. Gambling games include baccarat, blackjack, craps, keno, and roulette. The game also features 36 slot machines, and five poker games: five-card draw, five-card stud, seven-card stud, Texas hold 'em, and video poker. In reality, poker games were illegal in New Jersey. The player can customize their character's poker face to include features such as facial hair and sunglasses. The game includes multiplayer for two players via a modem, while online network play allowed up to four players. To provide a realistic casino experience, a bar maid occasionally asks the player if they are interested in purchasing an alcoholic beverage.

Mark Alan Willett of Computer Gaming World criticized the game's long installation time, and wrote that the game "attempts a lot but fails at most of it". Willett praised the appearance of the blackjack and baccarat tables, but was disappointed by the "rough-drawn" graphics of gaming chips and the "oddly-cartoonish" shuffling of cards. Willett also criticized the various slot machine games for their lack of modern design and their similar appearances to each other, and noted that their reels spin up rather than down. Willett further wrote that there "is no way to intelligently" determine which slot machines pay more, "So, playing them is an even worse risk than in a real casino." Willett criticized the poker games as well, stating that the computer players "are unable to present a truly human face," whereas real poker requires evaluation of other players' facial expressions.

Dennis Lynch of the Chicago Tribune praised the graphics and the multiplayer option, considering them to be the game's "big draws". Paul C. Schuytema of Compute! wrote that Trump Castle 3 "comes as close as possible to simulating a real casino" and stated that the gambling games play "very well".

== See also ==
- Donald Trump's Real Estate Tycoon
