= Witchaven II: Blood Vengeance =

1996 video game

- Cover art by Ken Kelly
- Developer: Capstone Software
- Publisher: Intracorp Entertainment
- Producer: James Wheeler
- Designers: Scott Nixon; James Wheeler
- Programmers: Les Bird; Joe Abbati
- Composers: Joe Abbati; Steve Newton
- Engine: Build
- Platform: MS-DOS
- Release: May 6, 1996
- Genre: First-person shooter
- Modes: Single-player, multiplayer

Witchaven II: Blood Vengeance is a fantasy-themed first-person shooter for MS-DOS compatible operating systems released in 1996 by Capstone Software. It is a sequel to 1995's Witchaven. Both games use the Build engine. It was Capstone's last proprietary game before they and their parent company Intracorp went bankrupt. In Witchaven II, the player controls the returning knight Grondoval, the hero of the first game, as he is trying to stop an evil witch from carrying a titular blood vengeance in revenge for him having slain her sister in the original game. It received generally negative reviews, with criticism directed at its controls, enemy AI, and general mediocrity as compared to other first-person shooters coming out at the time. The game is supported by the BuildGDX source port.

== Gameplay ==
Gameplay screenshot of Witchaven II in full-screen mode

The sequel's gameplay system is very similar but features some other improvements over the first game, such as possibility to wield two weapons (one in each hand) and to hold a shield in the non-weapon hand. Compared with the previous game the level of difficulty was also increased and the graphics were partially refined. Unlike the first game in the series it came with the Build level editor which meant that the players were able to create their own levels. Unlike in the first game, most enemies are men instead of monsters.

== Plot ==
Witchaven II takes place after the events of the first game, when the forces of darkness were triumphed over: the witch queen Illwhyrin was destroyed in her lair in the isle of Char and the evil curse was lifted. During the victory party celebrating the destruction of Witchaven, the hero of the game, Grondoval, falls into a slumber. After awaking, he is told by the mysterious female golden dragon named Ikethsti that the great witch Cirae-Argoth, one of the most powerful of Nether-Reaches Order of Witches, has arrived to avenge the death of her sister. An army of demons and Argothonian clansmen has abducted Grondoval's beloved princess Elizabeth and the other people of his homeland Stazhia to exact the titular blood vengeance and now it is only up to Grondoval to try and rescue his countrymen before they will all be gone forever. His new quest is fight his way to find and vanquish Cirae-Argoth, thwarting her plot, and to capture the Horned Skull item which would then contain her evil powers forever. The story is told in the intro sequence and further explained in the game's manual.

After killing Cirae-Argoth, the game ends with a cinematic sequence showing her corpse turn into a skeleton, which then suddenly rises and attempts to flee while laughing until it's hit and shattered by Grondoval's magic missile. Grondoval loses consciousness and awakens in a different location. The dragon Ikethsti arrives again to tell a cryptic message, saying the whole plot was really an elaborate set up as Cirae-Argoth was not her real master and Grondoval's kindred has never disappeared; it was actually only Grondoval who has vanished. (This scene directly contradicts much of what was written in the game's manual, including text beyond the introduction section.) Ikethsti also tells him his trials are far from over, and they will see each other again (apparently hinting at another sequel that has never arrived). In the final scene, the witch's skull swallows a butterfly and vanishes into the ground while ominous music plays. Computer Gaming World, baffled by the ending cutscene, included it in their 1996 list of the least rewarding endings of all time.

== Reception ==
Reception

Review scores
Publication	Score
Computer Gaming World	2/5
Next Generation	2/5
PC Gamer (US)	58%
PC Zone	72%
Maximum	2/5
PC Player	2/5
PC Action	62%

Witchaven II received mostly poor reviews. Computer and Video Games criticized the quality of the game's cinematic cutscenes and the enemy AI, as well as its overall feel of a rushed expansion to the first Witchaven instead of a more proper sequel. A review in Next Generation said that the game "is an improvement over the original, but it doesn't stack up to comparable games in its genre." The reviewer argued that hand-to-hand combat from a first-person perspective is intrinsically unexciting since the player character can neither aim nor move around as much, and complained of controls that are less than responsive. However, he praised the Build level editor as being better documented than the one in Duke Nukem 3D. Brett Jones of PC Gamer US wrote: "Where Duke takes players on a wickedly frantic and bloody ride, Witchaven II has you slogging, trundling, and hacking your way through dark levels and mindless enemies from start to finish," and adding: "If the controls weren’t so bad and the enemies so boneheaded, you might find Witchaven II’s sinister design a welcome change from the norm. But those little touches aren’t enough." Daniel Jevons of Maximum panned the game, saying that "The graphics are sluggish (despite using the same engine as Duke), the controls are unresponsive, the collision detection is dodgy (particularly on close combat), and the game commits the cardinal sin of having loads of invisible hidden traps that kill you instantly." He remarked that the game was a particularly poor choice for buyers given that Duke Nukem 3D had just been released and Quake was due out in less than a month.
