= Wall Street Wizard =

1988 German video game

- Developer: Expert Software
- Publisher: Data Liberation
- Release: 1988

Wall Street Wizard is a 1988 German video game later published in 1990 by Data Liberation in English.

== Gameplay ==
Wall Street Wizard is a stock trading game in which the action on the stock exchange floor is the focus, in which the player has 48 shares from around a dozen sectors using fictional companies.

== Reception ==
Reception

Review score
Publication	Score
Aktueller Software Markt	10/12

John Harrington reviewed Wall $treet Raider and Wall Street Wizard for Games International magazine, and gave it a rating of 7 out of 10, and stated that "In the end, choosing between the two may come down to that hoary old question of what is preferable: game or simulation. Wizard puts the emphasis on fun and plays better than Raider as a solo game, and would therefore better suit the 'seat of the pants' style of player.."

The reviewer from Aktueller Software Markt felt that people playing stock market games just for fun would enjoy Wall Street Wizard thanks to the lively design.

The reviewer from German magazine ST Computer felt that the game did a good job of emulating the market atmosphere, and liked its many options and features, commenting that the graphics were good for a strategy game but bemoaned the lack of sound.

The reviewer from German magazine Joystick felt that it was a well done and realistic real time German stock market simulation, and that the comprehensive German manual included with the software package was really helpful.
