= Zorro (1995 video game) =

1995 video game

- Developer: Capstone Software
- Publisher: Capstone Software
- Platform: MS-DOS
- Release: 1995
- Genre: Platform
- Mode: Single-player

Zorro: A Cinematic Action Adventure is a cinematic platform game developed and published by Capstone Software. It was released in 1995 for MS-DOS compatible operating systems. The game is based on Johnston McCulley's Zorro character.

== Gameplay ==
Zorro is a side-scrolling game with cinematic action and live action full-motion video cutscenes. Players must react to every hazard, which forms the core of the game's adventure, including battling a man‑eating plant with a whip. Gameplay is similar to that of 1989's Prince of Persia.

== Development and release ==
Zorro was developed by Miami-based Capstone Software. The studio, a production division of the larger IntraCorp, underwent a major reorganization in 1994 just prior to starting the project. It was initially reported that Capstone acquired the license to produce an adaptation of a then-upcoming feature film optioned by Steven Spielberg, which would later become The Mask of Zorro. Zorro was among several licenses for film properties purchased by Capstone during that time. However, public relations executive Tony Panaccio alleged later on that the game had nothing to do with either the movie or the Topps Comics series and that the developer was asked to change the game's logo to avoid consumer confusion. Zorro was originally set to be released in November 1994 but was delayed to the following spring. The initial shipment of the game suffered from at least one software bug involving the sound that Capstone offered to fix with a free patch downloadable from its America Online page or from a disc mailed from the company. At some point in 1995, Capstone gave away thousands of copies of Zorro to customers for free.

== Reception ==
Reception

Review scores
Publication	Score
Computer Gaming World	3/5
Joystick	10/100
Next Generation	1/5
PC Gamer (US)	57%
PC Games	51%
PC Joker	35%
PC Player	35/100
Pelit	74/100
Play Time	45%
Players (BR)	3/5
Power Play	15%
Power Unlimited	68/100
Score	30%
Top Secret	25/40

Zorro received a largely negative critical reception. Next Generation rated it one star out of five, stating that "Unless you've got a fetish for black leather masks and whips, or you're an accredited psychic, we strongly recommend that you avoid this title like the plague."
