= NAM (video game) =

1998 video game

- North American cover art
- Developer: TNT Team
- Publisher: GT Interactive
- Director: Dante Anderson
- Producers: Dante Anderson; Nicolas Lavroff; Greg Williams
- Designers: Lado Crnologar; Heikki Korva; Tuomo Korva
- Programmer: Matt Saettler
- Artists: Lado Crnologar; Heikki Korva; Tuomo Korva
- Writers: Lado Crnologar; Heikki Korva; Tuomo Korva
- Composer: Atom Ellis
- Engine: Build
- Platform: MS-DOS
- Release: NA: July 31, 1998
- Genre: First-person shooter
- Modes: Single-player, multiplayer

NAM, sold under the name Napalm in Walmart retail outlets, is a first-person shooter set during the Vietnam War. It was developed for MS-DOS by TNT Team and published by GT Interactive in 1998. A direct sequel, World War II GI, was released in 1999.

NAM was re-released on Steam on November 6, 2014, with Retroism and Night Dive Studios as the publishers. It was released on GOG.com on March 20, 2020.

== Gameplay ==
The game is very similar to Duke Nukem 3D. The game consists of 34 levels divided into four episodes; there are two single player episodes with fifteen levels and two multiplayer episodes with nineteen levels. Very little was changed in regards to controls, movement rate, physics, and CON (control file) language. The only immediately noticeable change in the game code was the removal of the remote detonator for weapon 6, the grenade, which was a pipebomb in Duke Nukem 3D. In the game, there are AI marines which will help the player in some levels, each with different classes and specialties. Mines are present in most levels, requiring players to activate his mine detector.

== Plot ==
The player assumes the role of Alan "The Bear" Westmoreland, a United States Marine Corps sergeant. The story begins with a deadly Viet Cong raid, where Westmoreland is left to survive of his own accord. The player must deal with various firefights, ambushes, booby traps, snipers, air strikes, anti-personnel mines, and more in order to finish their way to the end of each level.

The player is placed in the center of the Vietnam War in 1966, playing as Westmoreland, who is a very deadly and highly trained U.S. Marine. Westmoreland is under the command of the Central Intelligence Agency and has undergone genetic engineering to become a super human war machine. He is given standard military orders, and is usually placed alone or with small teams, pitted against overwhelming odds. To prove himself a successful experiment, he must survive several tours of duty in order to show that the side effects of the serum can be overcome.

== Development ==
It originated from the creation of TNT Team's 1997 total conversion mod for Duke Nukem 3D titled Platoon. It was picked up by Infogrames, who put them to work on a remake with more professional art and some custom source code modifications by Matt Saettler, product manager for Blood, which resulted in NAM. The game was released on July 31, 1998. U.S. Marine Sergeant Dan Snyder, who helped pioneer computer simulation training for American troops with a Doom army mod, was a consultant on the project.

== Reception ==
Reception

Aggregate score
Aggregator	Score
GameRankings	39%

Review scores
Publication	Score
AllGame	3/5
Computer Games Strategy Plus	2.5/5
Computer Gaming World	1/5
GameSpot	4/10
IGN	3/10
Next Generation	1/5
PC Accelerator	2/10
PC Gamer (UK)	72%
PC Gamer (US)	53%
PC Zone	28%

The game received "unfavorable" reviews according to the review aggregation website GameRankings. Next Generation said, "This horrendous Duke Nukem 3D conversion should have stayed on the Net as freeware. The GT logo on the box certainly doesn't warrant its $20 price tag, nor does the game's heavily hyped claim to fame: 'Created with the developer of the Doom conversion for the Marine Corps.' We certainly feel sorry for the Marines."

The game was nominated for GameSpot's "Worst Game of the Year" award in its Best & Worst of 1998 Awards, which went to Trespasser.
