= Marine Doom =

1996 video game modification

Marine Doom is a 1996 modification of the first-person shooter Doom II for the United States Marine Corps, which was later made available for download to the public. In the game, a fireteam, comprising four Marines, is supposed to accomplish a specific mission, the default being the destruction of an enemy bunker, although other scenarios such as a hostage rescue in a foreign embassy can be designed. In order to allow coordination of their movements, these soldiers play on separated computers in the same room. The fireteam consists of a team leader, two riflemen and one machine-gunner. A major intent of the mod was to train soldiers "in tactics and communications".

The demon enemies from the original Doom series were replaced with "opposition forces".

== History ==
In 1996, General Charles C. Krulak, Commandant of the U.S. Marine Corps, issued a directive to use wargames for improving "Military Thinking and Decision-Making Exercises". He entrusted the Marine Combat Development Command with the task of developing, exploiting and approving computer-based wargames to train U.S. Marines for "decision making skills, particularly when live training time and opportunities were limited".

A group of U.S. Marine simulations experts originally led by Major Kirk Skinner, including Lieutenant Luis E. Velazquez and Lieutenant Scott Barnett as the project officers with Sergeant Snyder as one of the designers and modelers, in Quantico, Virginia of the Automated Information Systems Office, and later Marine Corps Modeling and Simulation Management Office (MCMSMO), obtained a copy of the commercial Doom, released in 1993 by id Software, and used it to develop a simulation that focused on mutual fireteam support, protection of the automatic rifleman, proper sequencing of an attack, ammunition discipline and succession of command.

Their code was adapted for the commercial Doom II before its release, and requires a commercial copy of Doom II 1.9 to run.

In 1997, video game publisher GT Interactive acquired the rights to distribute Marine Doom.

U.S. Marine Sergeant Dan Snyder, who worked on the mod, was later a consultant on the video game NAM.

== See also ==
- Full Spectrum Warrior, another game initially developed for the United States Army for training purposes
- America's Army, a complete game developed on behalf of the United States Army as a recruiting tool
- Doom modding
