= Search for the Titanic =

1989 video game

- Developers: Codesmiths; IntraCorp
- Publisher: Capstone Software
- Programmers: Jeff Jones; Sean Puckett
- Platforms: MS-DOS, Commodore 64
- Release: February 1989: MS-DOS; 1989: C64
- Genre: Adventure
- Mode: Single-player

Search for the Titanic is a graphic adventure developed by Codesmiths and IntraCorp and published by its subsidiary Capstone Software in 1989. It was released for MS-DOS compatible operating systems, then ported to the Commodore 64. Versions for the Apple II and Amiga were planned, but never reached development (or just cancelled and not completed in the case of the announced Apple II port). Accolade, Inc. helped to distribute the game. Much of the gameplay is based on Robert Ballard's expedition to locate the wreck of the RMS Titanic.

== Gameplay ==
Search for the Titanic is an oceanographic simulation game. The player must build up reputation and resources by exploring sunken ships on an expedition to find the Titanic. To gain funds, the player needs sponsorship with valid reasons to carry out the voyage. If successful, the player will need the right equipment, adequate supplies, an ideal vessel and competent personnel on a limited budget. The player then navigates across the sea to find a suitable place to dive and locate a shipwreck. The game includes 75 shipwrecks, over 100 maps and charts, and 47 ports. Problems can occur during the expedition including the crew's health declining, bad weather and running out of supplies and funds. Some of the shipwrecks include Spanish treasure and Noah's Ark.

== Development ==
President of Intracorp, Leigh Rothschild, was fascinated by historical shipwrecks and earned a degree in history the University of Miami. Being president of the large electronic company, Rothschild had access to an array of multimedia. He built up his inspiration from any literature and videos on diving and shipwrecks he could find. In June 1987, Rothschild came up with an idea about the Titanic. For this project, he needed recent photos of the shipwreck and expertise from an oceanographer. He turned his attention to Woods Hole Oceanographic Institution, whom his brother Kenneth had worked with previously and were conveniently located close enough for him to contact on a daily basis. Woods Hole were keen on the idea of a video game based on their exploits and Intracorp obtained the required rights. At the request of Robert Ballard, Intracorp changed it so that no treasure collecting occurred during the gameplay, in order to set a good example for players and future oceanographers.

Coding the game required the help of Codesmiths programmers Jeff Jones and Sean Puckett. Before their assignment, they did have a keen interest in the Titanic ocean liner. The proposal took ten days to produce. By November 1988, a substantial amount of programming had been completed. Puckett drew the maps of the game by hand. The simulated weather was the most difficult feature to implement. All organisation names in the game were created to not coincide with real-life companies. Jones and Puckett had difficulty accurately researching the diving equipment, so they had to make educated guesses. Ballard's photos were not good enough for digitising in their current format, so Codesmiths sent the slides to a photographic lab to be converted to contact prints (placed on one sheet of light-sensitive paper). The page of contact prints were then placed inside a scanner with a special digitising program to input them into a computer. The digitised images were then resized with dithering applied.

== Release ==
An Amiga version of Search for the Titanic was introduced at the Winter CES in January 1989. The IBM PC compatible version was highlighted at the ACE Game of Show in 1989. The Commodore 64 version was shown at the European Computer Trade Show in April 1990.

== Reception ==
Reception

Review scores
Publication	Score
The Games Machine	68% (DOS)
ACE	647 (C64)
Zzap!64	50% (C64)
Run	B (DOS)

Award
Publication	Award
Game Players	PC Excellence Award

A reviewer from The Games Machine gave the game a score of 68% and said that it lacks gameplay and gets boring, but may be worth checking out if players are looking for something different. A reviewer from Zzap!64 gave the game a score of 50% finding the graphics and screens uninteresting and the gameplay boring. An ST Log reviewer described it as an off-beat adventure with enough detail to consume a computer-bound treasure hunter for hours.

Woods Hole Oceanographic Institution reviewed the game for its geographical accuracy.
