= The Dark Half (video game) =

1992 video game

- Developer: Symtus
- Publisher: Capstone Software
- Platform: MS-DOS
- Release: 1992
- Genre: Adventure

The Dark Half is a 1992 video game published by Capstone Software. The game is based on Stephen King's 1989 novel The Dark Half.

== Gameplay ==
The Dark Half is a game in which Thad Beaumont must stop his killer alter-ego George Stark. The game is a graphic adventure in which the user interface commands are displayed on the screen as keys on a typewriter, while the text appears on paper coming out of the typewriter. Thad may pick up items and the player's graphic inventory can display over 35 items.

== Reception ==
Charles Ardai reviewed the game for Computer Gaming World, and stated that "In brief, everything that made The Dark Half an exceptional novel is missing from the game, as is anything that might have made the game an exceptional game in its own right. The Dark Half is not only a bad game, it is easily one of the worst games I have played in the last ten years, on top of which it is an insult to a fine work by one of our most underappreciated authors."

Joseph Boone for Computer Games Strategy Plus complained about the story, graphics and music, characters, and puzzles, and said that "It is very difficult to make a game with no outstanding features but Capstone proved to be up to the challenge."

David N. Eadington for Video Games & Computer Entertainment conceded that fans of Stephen King movies might be entertained, but stated that "A solid story is the fundamental aspect of any good graphic adventure, and it is there that The Dark Half crumbles."

German magazine PC Joker rated the game 29%, while Power Play rated the game 14%.
