= Casino Tournament of Champions =

1995 video game

- CD cover art
- Developer: Random Programming
- Publisher: Capstone Software
- Platform: DOS
- Release: 1995
- Genre: Casino
- Modes: Single-player, multiplayer

Casino Tournament of Champions is a video game developed by Random Programming and published by Capstone Software for DOS.

== Gameplay ==
Casino Tournament of Champions is a game featuring casino gambling games such as slots, video poker, blackjack, roulette, craps, minibaccarat, and seven versions of poker.

== Reception ==
Reception

Review scores
Publication	Score
Next Generation	3/5
Electronic Games	B−
Videogame and Computer World	76%

Next Generation reviewed the game, rating it three stars out of five, and stated that "if you're looking too [sic] add some casino action to your collection, CTOC is the package to buy - just don't expect anything spectacular."
