= Corridor 7: Alien Invasion =

1994 video game

- CD cover art
- Developer: Capstone Software
- Publishers: IntraCorp; GameTek
- Engine: Wolfenstein 3D engine
- Platform: MS-DOS
- Release: March 1994
- Genre: First-person shooter
- Modes: Single-player, multiplayer

Corridor 7: Alien Invasion is a first-person shooter video game developed by Capstone Software and published by IntraCorp and GameTek. The game was poorly received, largely due to its use of the outdated Wolfenstein 3D engine. A sequel, Corridor 8: Galactic Wars, was announced but later canceled.

== Plot ==
The staff of a top-secret research laboratory, Corridor 7, inadvertently opens an interdimensional portal known as the Vortex while experimenting on an alien artifact recovered from Mars. Shortly after, hostile aliens emerge from the Vortex and kill all of the staff. The player, as a lone special forces soldier, enters the base to fight the aliens and destroy the artifact, thereby closing the Vortex.

== Gameplay ==
Gameplay screenshot

Corridor 7 consists of 30 floors (with 40 floors in the CD version) and 6 bonus floors. The player is tasked with killing a certain number of enemies before the exit to the next floor is accessible. There are four difficulty settings, which modify the number of enemies that need to be eliminated and how much damage the player will take from enemy attacks and traps. In the CD version, there is a fifth setting ("President") which randomly scatters items and enemies throughout the game.

The player can activate the proximity map in one corner of the screen, showing a small section of the current level with active aliens marked in yellow. The map can be expanded by finding the floor plan.

The player is equipped with a visor capable of both infrared and night vision. Infrared is employed to detect invisible traps, while night vision enhances the player's vision in dark areas of the game.

Ammunition and health are not scattered around the levels as objects to pick up, but rather as dispenser bays encased in the level walls. The map can be expanded by finding the floor plan. Health is also available in rooms called Health Chambers, where the player can obtain up to 100 hit points. There are two ammo types for human firearms and alien firearms.

Locked areas require a color-coded (blue or red) pass card to be opened, which are granted by interacting with computer terminals.

=== Multiplayer ===
The success of the multiplayer modes in Doom is believed to be the reason behind the addition of LAN and modem game play modes in the CD release of Corridor 7. The only multiplayer mode featured is deathmatch, with 8 multiplayer maps included. Players can play as either the special forces soldiers from the single-player mode or as one of the aliens; playing as an alien results in possessing the distinctive abilities of the creature chosen (e.g. speed or endurance).

== Reception ==
Reception

Review score
Publication	Score
PC Zone	55%

Corridor 7 received mixed reviews at launch. Chris Anderson of PC Zone stated that the game offered "nothing new and what is there isn't very exciting", and largely criticized its use of the Wolfenstein 3D engine.

== Legacy ==
Corridor 8: Galactic Wars was the planned sequel to Corridor 7. The game was in development and used the Build engine, though it was never finished because the developer, Capstone Software, went bankrupt along with their parent company, IntraCorp, in 1996. The game only made it to prototype stage. In 2005, Les Bird sent the Corridor 8 prototype source code to a Corridor 7 fan, who put it onto his website as a free download.
