= Nightmares in the Sky =

Coffee table book by Stephen King and f-stop Fitzgerald

Nightmares in the Sky: Gargoyles and Grotesques
- First edition cover
- Author: Stephen King
- Illustrator: f-stop Fitzgerald
- Language: English
- Subject: Architecture
- Published: 1988 (Viking Studio Books)
- Publication place: United States
- Media type: Print (Hardcover)
- Pages: 128
- ISBN: 978-0-670-82307-9
- Preceded by: Danse Macabre (book)
- Followed by: On Writing: A Memoir of the Craft

Nightmares in the Sky: Gargoyles and Grotesques is a coffee table book about architectural gargoyles and grotesques, photographed by f-stop Fitzgerald (Richard Minissali) with accompanying text by Stephen King, and published in 1988. An excerpt was published in the September 1988 issue of Penthouse. Some of the images in the book were used as textures in the video games Doom and Doom II, as well as Witchaven, ShadowCaster, and The Elder Scrolls II: Daggerfall.

== Reception ==
Kirkus Reviews found some King's text took a "teen stance" occasionally, but that it "evokes the weight and brooding presence" of gargoyles, coming to a possibility to their purpose quoting King, "venting the waste material of our own hidden fears". However, it was the stark photographs from f-stop Fitzgerald that truly stood out to the reviewer.
