= Grandmaster Chess =

1992 video game

- CD-ROM cover art
- Developer: IntraCorp
- Publisher: Capstone Software
- Platforms: MS-DOS, Classic Mac OS, Windows
- Release: 1992: MS-DOS 3½" disk 1993: MS-DOS CD-ROM; 1995: Mac; 2021: Windows
- Genre: Computer chess
- Modes: Single-player, multiplayer

Grandmaster Chess is a computer chess game published for MS-DOS in 1992. It was developed by IntraCorp and its subsidiary Capstone Software that was focused on neural network technology and an artificial intelligence able to learn from mistakes.

The original release of the game includes VGA and SVGA support, multiple skill levels, different sets of pieces, boards and backgrounds, 2D/3D view, pull-down menus, ability to rewind and replay moves, and a rating of the player's strength. A 1993 CD-ROM version adds Terminator 2: Judgment Day: Chess Wars, an animated chess set like Battle Chess, as a tie-in with the film Terminator 2: Judgment Day. In 2021, a Windows port of the original was released as Grandmaster Championship Chess.

== Reception ==
Computer Gaming World stated that Grandmaster Chess "falls short of the current competition in terms of overall options". The magazine criticized the game's weak strategic analysis reporting, absence of an advertised teaching mode, and weak opening book. In a 1995 comparison between 11 chess programs, Computer Gaming World rated Grandmaster Championship Chess the third highest, sharing the same rating with Bobby Fischer Teaches Chess and Kasparov's Gambit. Game Players said that "Experienced players looking for a solid program with excellent graphics and a very smooth interface will love Grandmaster Chess."
