= Anyone for Cards? =

1994 video game

- Developer: Random Games
- Publisher: Capstone Software
- Platforms: Windows; Macintosh
- Release: 1994
- Genre: Digital tabletop

Anyone for Cards? is a 1994 video game from Capstone Software.

== Gameplay ==
Anyone for Cards? offers a customizable digital card game experience, featuring 11 traditional and lesser-known games like Cribbage, Pinochle, and Oh Hell. Players personalize their play area with various textures, backgrounds, and card backs—including whimsical choices like kittens. Each session begins with an animated introduction and allows users to select from 18 cartoon-style opponents with distinct playing styles and personalities. While these characters communicate via speech balloons, the game lacks voice interaction and multiplayer options. Gameplay spans multiple skill levels, from beginner to moderate difficulty, with a Practice Mode that reveals all players' cards to support learning. Rules are provided through a manual and online help.

== Development ==
Anyone for Cards? is a product of Random Games, a company founded in 1985 and based in Cary, North Carolina.

== Reception ==
Reception

Review scores
Publication	Score
All Game Guide	3.5/5
Computer Game Review	84%
PC Gamer	72%

PC Gamer said "Anyone For Cards? isn't a bad game; it does what it sets out to do, and includes games you won't find in many packages. But it doesn't do as much as it could, and all the cute window-dressing will probably get tiresome if you're really serious about your cards.

The game was awarded "The Gilbert Gottfried Award for Most Irritating Inhabitant of a CD-ROM" in 1995 by Electronic Entertainment.
