= Wall Street Raider =

1986 video game

- Original release cover
- Developers: Roninsoft (Michael D. Jenkins); Hackjack Games (Ben Ward, remaster)
- Publishers: Intracorp (MS-DOS); Roninsoft (Windows); Hackjack Games (remaster)
- Designer: Michael D. Jenkins
- Platforms: MS-DOS, Windows
- Release: 1986: MS-DOS; 2001: Windows; 2026: Steam (remastered)
- Genre: Business simulation
- Mode: Single-player

Wall Street Raider, stylized as Wall $treet Raider, is a business simulation game published for MS-DOS in 1986 by Intracorp. A Windows conversion was released in 2001.

== Gameplay ==
Wall $treet Raider is a game in which players use the stock market to take over companies. Up to four players can play and divide a billion dollars between them.

== Release ==
Intracorp included a coupon for a free rental of the 1987 film Wall Street with every purchase of the game.

== Reception ==
John Harrington reviewed Wall $treet Raider and Wall Street Wizard for Games International magazine, and gave it a rating of 6 out of 10, and stated that "Raider is a little dry as a solo game; you start the game with a considerable fortune and the temptation is to say '$250 000 is enough for any man, I'll emigrate to the Bahamas'.."

Daniel Carr for Computer Play called it "a BIG game" and "corporate warfare at its best".

== Legacy ==
In 2025, the game is being remastered by developer Ben Ward with a modern graphical interface, while preserving its original simulation engine and complexity, under Jenkins’ direct collaboration. As of February 2026, the original version of Wall $treet Raider is not currently available for purchase due to the bankruptcy of its former e-commerce platform., and early access to the modernized version was delayed as of March 10, 2026. The game was released in early access on Steam on May 14, 2026.
