= Chronomaster =

1995 video game

- Developer: DreamForge Intertainment
- Publishers: IntraCorp; Capstone Software; U.S. Gold
- Designers: Jane Lindskold; Roger Zelazny
- Programmers: Mike Breitkreutz; Rip Jaffurs; Don Wuenschell
- Artists: Jane Yeager; Michael Nicholson
- Composer: Jamie McMenamy
- Platform: MS-DOS
- Release: December 20, 1995
- Genre: Adventure
- Mode: Single-player

Chronomaster is an adventure game developed by DreamForge Intertainment for MS-DOS compatible operating systems and published by IntraCorp on 20 December 1995. Its main plot was written by novelist Roger Zelazny and was his last known work, since he died during the game's development. Because of Zelazny's passing, Dreamforge used in-house puzzle and game designers John McGirk and Aaron Kreader to complete a majority of the game puzzles, while leaving the overall game plot and concept intact according to Zelazny's vision.

Chronomaster narrates the story of Rene Korda (voiced by Ron Perlman), a retired and formerly renowned designer of "pocket universes" — self-contained worlds developed according to the tastes of the person who finances their construction. Korda is hired by a representative of the "Terran Regional government" to restore two pocket universes from a state of "temporal stasis" and to find out who is responsible for the situation.

== Gameplay ==
Each pocket universe contains a single solar system with anywhere from one to several worlds Korda can visit. Each world requires Korda to travel to magnetic North and use a "resonance tracer" to locate the universe's "world key". The world key (each protected by a unique puzzle) stops or starts the universe's temporal flow. Each pocket universe has a unique feel to it, reflecting the personality and interests of its owner. Verdry for example, owned by a woman known for creating a philosophical movement centered on nonsense and unreality, contains a world shaped and colored like an Easter egg.

In order to move within pocket universes in which time is stagnant, Korda employs "bottled time", a container which when opened provides him with a field in which times flows normally. Bottled time may also be used to activate objects and trigger ongoing events which were halted by the temporal stasis. He also counts on the help of a versatile context-sensitive tool which makes available different functions to him, depending on the pocket universe he visits. During his journey Korda is accompanied by his personal digital assistant (PDA) Jester (voiced by Lolita Davidovich), a flying blue spherical robot who provides more comic relief than help with gameplay. Korda is eventually joined by Milo, (voiced by Brent Spiner) a former student of Korda's and the sole survivor of a horrific pirate attack on his homeworld.

Chronomaster makes heavy use of CG cutscenes. Chronomaster possesses a degree of non-linearity in that many tasks exist which are unnecessary to complete the game, and puzzles frequently have two possible solutions.

== Reception ==
Reception

Review scores
Publication	Score
Computer Gaming World	4.5/5
Next Generation	4/5
PC Gamer (US)	84%
PC Zone	68%
Maximum	5/5
Computer Games Strategy Plus	4/5
Computer Game Review	81/88/95
PC Review	9/10

According to Charles Ardai of Computer Gaming World magazine, Chronomaster was commercially unsuccessful.

A reviewer for Next Generation magazine praised the game for its detailed graphics, simple and intuitive interface, "entertaining" dialogue, puzzles that are mostly neither too easy nor overly hard, and deep story based "around the concepts of immortality, universe construction, and the nature of time itself." The reviewer was also pleased with the voice acting from well-known stars, though he noted that some of the lesser-known actors gave "painful" performances. A reviewer for Maximum lauded Chronomaster for its story and presentation, calling the game "a prime example of [Roger Zelazny's] ability to create a compelling story that rewrites the rules of science as it goes." He described the pre-rendered graphics as "stunning" and said that the voice actors "add atmosphere to an already intriguing adventure."

Chronomaster was a runner-up for Computer Gaming World magazine's 1995 "Adventure Game of the Year" award, which ultimately went to I Have No Mouth, and I Must Scream. The editors wrote that "Both the script and the voice talents lift Chronomaster well above the usual standards of the genre." Chronomaster was also nominated as Computer Games Strategy Plus magazine's 1996 adventure game of the year, although it lost to The Neverhood.

== Legacy ==
Chronomaster was adapted into novel form in 1996; the novel closely followed the game's plot, and it was coauthored by Roger Zelazny and Jane Lindskold.
