= The Cardinal of the Kremlin =

1988 thriller novel by Tom Clancy

- First edition cover
- Author: Tom Clancy
- Language: English
- Series: Jack Ryan
- Release number: 3
- Genre: Techno-thriller; Military fiction; Spy fiction; Realistic fiction
- Publisher: G.P. Putnam's Sons
- Publication date: May 20, 1988
- Publication place: United States
- Media type: Print (hardcover, paperback)
- Pages: 544
- ISBN: 0399133453
- Preceded by: Patriot Games
- Followed by: Clear and Present Danger

The Cardinal of the Kremlin is a spy thriller novel, written by Tom Clancy and released on May 20, 1988. A direct sequel to The Hunt for Red October (1984), it features CIA analyst Jack Ryan as he must extract CARDINAL, the agency's highest placed asset in the Soviet military, who is being pursued by the KGB. The novel also features the Strategic Defense Initiative (SDI), a conceptual missile-defense system developed by the United States during that time, and its Soviet counterpart. The book debuted at number one on The New York Times Best Seller List.

== Plot ==
For thirty years, Colonel Mikhail Semyonovich "Misha" Filitov, a personal aide to the Soviet Minister of Defense and three-time Hero of the Soviet Union, has been passing military, technical, and political intelligence to the CIA as their highest agent-in-place, codenamed CARDINAL. His latest mission concerns a Soviet anti-ballistic missile research project codenamed "Bright Star", based at a secret defense installation located 50 km southeast of Dushanbe, Tajikistan.

Colonel Filitov sends Colonel Gennady Bondarenko of Signal Troops to Dushanbe to evaluate the facility and unwittingly procure information that Filitov will then send to his CIA contacts. Unfortunately, a minor slip-up in passing Filitov's intelligence at the Moscow subway alerts the KGB, which then aggressively pursues the couriers involved, including the daughter of a Politburo official recruited by the CIA and MI6. They become suspicious of Filitov and place him under surveillance. With the courier chain having been quickly shut down by the CIA station chief in Moscow, Edward Foley, Filitov's more important intelligence on Bright Star is delayed; however, he reveals the presence of a KGB agent infiltrating Bright Star's American counterpart Tea Clipper, which alarms the CIA.

The CIA then tasks Foley with extracting Filitov out of the country. However, when his wife Mary Pat, also a CIA officer, attempts to make a brush pass to Filitov at his apartment building, the two are arrested by the KGB. The Foleys are then declared persona non grata, while Filitov is imprisoned and psychologically tortured until he eventually confesses to his crimes. In an effort to salvage the mission, CIA analyst Jack Ryan, who had now learned of CARDINAL's identity, concocts a plan to secure the return of Filitov and at the same time force the defection of KGB chairman Nikolai Gerasimov, who has been vying for the position of General Secretary since Filitov's arrest; Ryan tries to prevent his ascension to power due to his anti-American ideology.

Ryan, who is part of the American arms negotiation team, travels to Moscow for the arms reduction talks. There he meets Gerasimov, and blackmails him into releasing Filitov and defecting; if his demands are not met, he will reveal what happened to the Soviet ballistic missile submarine Red October, which would disgrace the KGB chairman, who had used the incident to consolidate the KGB's control over the military. As counter-leverage, Gerasimov arranges for the kidnapping of Tea Clipper's top Strategic Defense Initiative scientist, Major Alan Gregory.

Gregory's kidnapping was undertaken by KGB agent Tania Bisyarina, who has been handling a mole inside Tea Clipper. The mole, a lesbian named Dr. Beatrice Taussig who is in love with Gregory's fiancée, eventually gives up Bisyarina to the FBI out of guilt, and the Hostage Rescue Team later saves Gregory from his Soviet captors in a shabby desert safe house in New Mexico. Ryan informs Gerasimov, who finally caves into his demands. The KGB chairman's wife and daughter are later extracted by CIA operative John Clark from Tallinn, Estonia into the submarine USS Dallas, which escapes into international waters with the help of former Red October commander Marko Ramius, who is now a submarine consultant.

Meanwhile, the secret ABM facility in Dushanbe finds itself under attack by the Afghan mudjahedin, whose leader is known as the Archer due to his expertise in using surface-to-air missiles to bring down Soviet ground support aircraft. Colonel Bondarenko, who was there for a second round of evaluations, manages to repel the attackers, protecting Bright Star's scientific and engineering personnel and eventually killing the Archer.

On the last day of the arms negotiation talks, Gerasimov releases Filitov so that they can both proceed to Sheremetyevo Airport, joining Ryan and the American negotiation team in returning to the United States. They successfully board the American delegation's aircraft, but Ryan is left behind and captured by KGB officer Sergei Golovko, his counterpart in the arms talks who had become aware of their planned departure. A Mikoyan-Gurevich MiG-25 attempts to force the American delegation's plane to return to Moscow, but the plane successfully escapes. Ryan is led to the private dacha of General Secretary Andrei Narmonov, where they discuss the CIA's interest in his political position and interference in the Soviet Union's internal security before Narmonov releases Ryan.

Filitov, who was extensively debriefed by the CIA, later dies due to heart disease. He is buried at Camp David, within twenty miles of the Antietam battlefield.

== Characters ==
- Jack Ryan: Special Assistant to the CIA Deputy Director of Intelligence and the main CIA representative on the U.S. arms negotiation team.
- Mikhail “Misha” Semyonovich Filitov: Personal aide to the Soviet Defense Minister and former tank officer for the Soviet Army during World War II, who is three times a Hero of the Soviet Union. He was first recruited into the CIA by Oleg Penkovsky in the early 1960s under the codename CARDINAL, and becomes their highest agent-in-place in the Kremlin for thirty years. He became alienated from the Soviet government after the death of his wife and two sons and does not care for the current Soviet leadership due to the excessive losses suffered by the Soviet military in the Afghan-Soviet War.
- Dimitri Timofeyevich Yazov: Soviet Defense Minister, Colonel Filitov's superior.
- Nikolay Borissovich Gerasimov: Chairman of the Committee for State Security (KGB), later blackmailed into defecting to the United States.
- Colonel Klementi Vladimirovich Vatutin: officer of the Second Directorate of the KGB, in charge of investigating and later interrogating Filitov.
- Andrey Il’ych Narmonov: General Secretary of the Communist Party of the Soviet Union
- Svetlana Vaneyeva: daughter of a senior Politburo member who became a CIA and British SIS asset
- Ilya Arkadyevich Vaneyev: senior Politburo member, Svetlana Vaneyeva's father
- Mikhail Petrovich Alexandrov: senior Politburo member described as an ideologue/academician, Narmonov’s rival, supporter of Gerasimov
- Sergey Nikolayevich Golovko: officer of the First Directorate of the KGB and Ryan's counterpart in the arms reduction talks. Later gives him a patronymic, Ivan Emmetovich, which translates to "John, son of Emmet".
- Sergey Nikolayevich Platonov: KGB chief of station (rezident) in Washington, D.C., under cover as ambassador
- Colonel Gennady Iosifovich Bondarenko: Colonel of Signal Troops, whose technical expertise Filitov leverages when sending him to Bright Star to evaluate the facility.
- Major Alan Gregory: United States's top Strategic Defense Initiative scientist based in Tea Clipper.
- Dr. Candace "Candi" Long: Expert in adaptive optics, Major Gregory's fiancée.
- Dr. Beatrice Taussig: Optical physicist at Tea Clipper and KGB agent (codenamed "Livia") controlled by KGB agent Tania Bisyarina. A lesbian in love with Dr. Long, her colleague.
- Captain Tania Bisyarina: Female KGB operative (cover name "Ann") who controls Taussig and eventually kidnaps Gregory. Later killed by a sniper rifle during the FBI Hostage Rescue Team's extraction of Gregory.
- Edward "Ed" Foley: CIA chief of station in Moscow, under cover as embassy press attaché. Filitov's case officer who is later expelled from the Soviet Union after his arrest.
- Mary Patricia Kaminsky Foley: CIA operative, Ed Foley's wife. Filitov's case officer who is also PNG'd out of the country after his arrest.
- Bart Mancuso: Commanding officer of the Los Angeles-class submarine USS Dallas
- Marko Aleksandrovich Ramius: Former commanding officer of Soviet ballistic missile submarine Red October, which appears in the novel as being stripped of its equipment and later scuttled. He now works for the United States Navy and the CIA as Mark Ramsey, utilizing his submarine knowledge and leadership skills.
- John Clark: CIA operations officer who spirits Gerasimov's wife and daughter out of the Soviet Union
- The Archer: A former mathematics teacher of Afghan descent who becomes an guerrilla leader after a Soviet airstrike kills his family. He got his name from being an expert with the Soviet SA-7 and the American Stinger surface-to-air missiles.
- Judge Arthur Moore: Director of Central Intelligence
- James Greer: CIA Deputy Director of Intelligence
- Bob Ritter: CIA Deputy Director for Operations

== Themes ==
The Cardinal of the Kremlin is considered to be Clancy's primary example of a traditional espionage novel until Red Rabbit (2002). It included “a near fetishist attention to the details of the tradecraft of spying and an exploration of the individuals who take up this dangerous vocation”. In addition, the book was written during the time of Soviet general secretary Mikhail Gorbachev’s rule, which was considered as a crucial point in world history where Communism in the Soviet Union began its decline. Clancy affirms his opinion that with reformers in the Soviet government like Gorbachev, the country will be more likely to establish a shift in its relations between the United States, which was later made possible by the dissolution of the country three years later.

The book was also written at the time of the Soviet occupation of Afghanistan, as well as the Strategic Defense Initiative, a proposed missile defense system intended to protect the United States from attack by ballistic strategic nuclear weapons. They were both featured in the novel. It also continues elements set forth in previous novel The Hunt for Red October (1984), including Filitov and Ramius’s similarities in motivation for committing treason against their own country.

== Reception ==
The book became the bestselling novel of the year, selling 1,277,000 hardcover copies. It received positive reviews. Kirkus Reviews praised the book as "less reliant on technoblather than previous Clancy works, and awash in subplots, most of them entertaining. Plenty of action; no mushy stuff." In Robert Lekachman's review of the book for The New York Times, he hailed it as "by far the best of the Jack Ryan series", adding: "While his prose is no better than workmanlike (the genre does not, after all, attract many budding Flauberts), the unmasking of the title's secret agent, the Cardinal, is as sophisticated an exercise in the craft of espionage as I have yet to encounter." Bob Woodward, reviewing for The Washington Post, regarded the book as "a great spy novel" which "rivals Clancy's The Hunt for Red October, surpasses his Red Storm Rising and runs circles around his Patriot Games".

== Adaptations ==
=== Video game ===
The Cardinal of the Kremlin is also the title of a 1991 video game based on the novel, which is a global management simulation developed for Amiga.

=== Film ===
After the release of Clear and Present Danger (1994), a film based on the book was planned. Writers such as John Milius, and Lee and Janet Scott Batchler were considered to write the screenplay adaptation, but it was deemed too difficult to adapt, resulting in producer Mace Neufeld purchasing the rights to The Sum of All Fears. Harrison Ford was set to reprise his role as Jack Ryan, co-starring with William Shatner.
