= Operation Body Count =

1994 video game

- Developer: Capstone Software
- Publishers: NA: Capstone Software; EU: U.S. Gold
- Engine: Wolfenstein 3D
- Platform: MS-DOS
- Release: NA: 1994; EU: 1994
- Genre: First-person shooter
- Modes: Single-player, multiplayer

Operation Body Count is a 1994 first-person shooter that uses the Wolfenstein 3D engine. It was developed and published by Capstone Software.

== Plot ==
Terrorists have taken over the headquarters of the United Nations and have seized the government officials in the building. They are now being held as hostages in the top floor of the building by Victor Baloch, the leader of the terrorist gang.

As a member of an Elite Squad specialising in anti-terrorist measures, the player must command their team and reach the top floor (the 40th level), rescue the hostages and eliminate the terrorist threat.

== Gameplay ==
Game screenshot.

Using a modified Wolfenstein 3D engine, the gameplay is very similar to the majority of other clones of the time. The game consists of 40 levels. The first few levels are set in the sewers, where the player attempts to make their way up to the basement of the building.

The player starts with an assault shotgun, which has an unlimited supply of ammunition. As the game progress, the player can acquire an Uzi, IWI Galil, flamethrower and grenade launcher.

Upon getting into the UN building, the player then combats the terrorists. When level 40 is reached, the player comes face-to-face with Victor himself.

== Reception ==
Reception

Review scores
Publication	Score
AllGame	3/5
PC Gamer (US)	64%

PC Gamer rated the game 64%, comparing the enemies to cardboard-cutouts, describing the weapons as mediocre and criticizing the wall textures as dark and grainy making it hard to see activity in the level.
