= Ion Fury =

2019 first-person shooter video game

- Developers: Voidpoint; General Arcade (consoles)
- Publisher: 3D Realms
- Director: Richard Gobeille
- Designers: Max Ylitalo; Leonardo Pellegrini; Jarmo Kylmäaho; Vitaliy Bondarenko
- Programmers: Richard Gobeille; Evan Ramos; Jonathan Strander; Alex Dawson
- Artists: Aleksander Kowalczyk; Arturo Pahua; Fox Martins
- Composer: Jarkko Rotstén
- Series: Bombshell
- Engine: Build
- Platforms: Windows, Linux, PlayStation 4, Xbox One, Nintendo Switch
- Release: Windows, Linux: WW: August 15, 2019; Switch, PS4, Xbox One: WW: May 14, 2020
- Genre: First-person shooter
- Mode: Single-player

Ion Fury is a cyberpunk first-person shooter video game developed by Voidpoint and published in 2019 by 3D Realms. It is a prequel to the 2016 video game Bombshell. Ion Fury runs on a modified version of Ken Silverman's Build engine and is the first original commercial game to use the engine in 20 years, the previous being Duke Nukem: Zero Hour. An expansion, Ion Fury: Aftershock, was released in October 2023.

The game was originally titled Ion Maiden, but the name was changed following legal action from the band Iron Maiden.

== Plot ==
The player assumes the role of Shelly "Bombshell" Harrison, a bomb disposal expert aligned to the Global Defense Force. Dr. Jadus Heskel, a transhumanist cult leader, unleashes an army of cybernetically enhanced soldiers on the futuristic dystopian city of Neo D.C., which Shelly is tasked with fighting through.

== Development ==
Ion Fury is built on EDuke32, a fork of the Build engine which supports modern operating systems while also implementing a broader range of features. The source code of Ion Fury is part of the EDuke32 source port.

=== Name change ===
In May 2019, it was announced that the band Iron Maiden would be suing 3D Realms for $2 million for "[the] misappropriation and use of a virtually identical imitation of the Iron Maiden trademark". 3D Realms quickly responded on Twitter, stating that these are "frivolous claims anyone who has played Ion Maiden would find more over the top than Shelly's 'Loverboy', her signature 18-round triple-barreled revolver".

The lawsuit claims that Ion Maiden "has the same look and feel" to the Android/iOS game Iron Maiden: Legacy of the Beast previously released on July 5, 2016. It also lists several alleged similarities, including the name "Ion Maiden", the font used for the game title, the main character Shelly 'Bombshell' Harrison and Steve Harris, the skull symbol, and the Eddie character. However, several of the allegedly similar elements cited in the lawsuit were present in a previous 3D Realms game, Bombshell, released on January 29, 2016, including the main character name and the skull symbol. According to Scott Miller, founder of 3D Realms, "The name Ion Maiden comes from the basic weapon used by the same female hero in her first game, Bombshell."

On July 11, 2019, 3D Realms announced that the title of Ion Maiden was changed to Ion Fury. Also announced was that voice actor Jon St. John, best known for the character Duke Nukem, was confirmed to be voicing the game's main villain.

== Reception ==
Reception

Aggregate score
Aggregator	Score
Metacritic	(PC) 79/100 (PS4) 75/100 (XONE) 70/100 (NS) 77/100

Review scores
Publication	Score
Destructoid	8/10
Eurogamer	Recommended
Game Informer	9/10
GameRevolution	(PC) 4.5/5 (NS) 4/5
IGN	7.5/10
Nintendo Life	7/10
PC Gamer (US)	77/100
PCGamesN	9/10
Push Square	7/10
Shacknews	8/10

All versions of Ion Fury received "generally favorable reviews" on Metacritic.

IGN gave the game a score of 7.5/10, saying it "authentic throwback to Duke Nukem 3D that certainly hails to the king but can't quite dethrone him." PCGamesN's Chris Capel called it "probably the best Build engine game ever" and "challenging, funny, cleverly designed, and shockingly attractive." GameRevolution's Alex Santa Maria called it "an updated take on Duke Nukem 3D that goes above and beyond nostalgic pandering to become one of the better first-person shooters in recent memory." Game Informer's Javy Gwaltney called it "everything that I've wanted from a modernized take on the arcadey shooters of the 90s. The pitch-perfect movement, the enemy variety, creative weaponry, and fantastic level design all add up to a superb shooter campaign."

=== Awards ===
Ion Fury won "Player's Choice Indie of the Year 2019" at IndieDB. The soundtrack won the "Outstanding Achievement for old school composing techniques" award at Game Audio Awards 2020.

=== Controversy ===
On August 16, 2019, less than a day after the official release, Discord chat logs from members of Voidpoint were shared, displaying purportedly transphobic remarks by the developers. Following multiple requests for a comment on the situation by gaming news sites and retro gaming-focused YouTube personalities, Voidpoint and 3D Realms apologized and pledged to institute a zero-tolerance policy on "disparaging language". They also pledged to remove two lines of in-game text. Additionally, $10,000 of Ion Fury's initial sales were donated to the Trevor Project.

The developer response yielded mixed reactions, including a considerable increase in negative reviews on the game's Steam page, many of which accused the developers of censorship. On August 26, 2019, the developers reversed their stance and stated that they would only remove one of the messages, containing a slur, but no other content. Polygon cited the increase in negative reviews as basis for the reversal. Voidpoint and 3D Realms issued a joint statement that they would not remove further content from Ion Fury or any future games, stating their opposition to the censorship of creative works of any kind.

== Expansion and sequel ==
An expansion pack for the game was announced at the Realms Deep 2020 event with a 2021 release date. It was revealed in 2021 as Ion Fury: Aftershock for a release that same year. The developers announced that the expansion would feature thirteen new levels, a new weapon and inventory items, and several new enemy and ammo types. Arrange Mode introduces "an amped-up remix of the entire original campaign with mirrored levels and modified enemy and item placement". The expansion was released on October 2, 2023 for PC.

A sequel titled Phantom Fury, built on Unreal Engine, was released on April 23, 2024.
