= William Shatner's TekWar =

1995 video game

- Developer: Capstone Software
- Publishers: NA: Capstone Software; EU: U.S. Gold
- Producer: James M. Wheeler
- Designer: Brandon Chamberlain
- Programmers: Les Bird; Jeff Schulz
- Writers: Brandon Chamberlain; Tony Panaccio
- Composer: Joe Abbati
- Series: TekWar
- Engine: Build
- Platform: MS-DOS
- Release: October 16, 1995
- Genre: First-person shooter
- Modes: Single-player, multiplayer

William Shatner's TekWar is a first-person shooter video game derived from the TekWar series of novels created by William Shatner and ghost-written by science-fiction author Ron Goulart. It was published for MS-DOS in 1995 by Capstone Software. The game was developed using the Build engine.

== Plot ==
The game's narrative takes place through cutscenes at the beginning and end of each level, featuring Shatner himself (in character as Walter Bascom) as the narrator. Cutscenes vary depending on the player's performance during missions: if the player does not shoot any innocent non-player characters (NPCs), kills the TekLord in the mission, and does not raise any tension (i.e. walking with his gun drawn), Bascom delivers praise. On the other hand, shooting innocent characters or aborting the mission causes him to threaten to have you put back into cryo-storage.

The premise details an ex-cop who acts as a rogue agent under the direct guidance of Walter Bascom, exterminating drug dealers ("TekLords") who peddle "Tek", a highly addictive neurological drug. Bascom sends the player through several missions to kill TekLords. Killing each TekLord gives players a symbol to be taken into the Matrix, a virtual computer world where players must decipher the meanings of the symbols. Killing all seven TekLords has players return to the Matrix one final time to stop a Tek distribution system that is wired into the Matrix.

Upon successfully halting the Tek distribution system, Bascom praises the player for their deeds, and promises them a permanent spot in his agency and a guarantee that their original sentencing will be dismissed.

== Gameplay ==
The two most distinguishable features are the hub-based level system (all the levels are interconnected by a subway station), and the fact that all of the NPCs in the game (enemies, policemen and civilians) are shootable. If the player draws his gun, the policemen will attack. When a policeman or enemy is killed, their ammo can be picked up. Civilians react to having the player's gun pointed at them. Missions are completed when the TekLord of that mission is defeated in combat.

== Reception ==
Maximum praised the game's combination of action with puzzles and strategy, impressive graphics, vast free-roaming game world, and networked multiplayer. Saying that the only problem with the game is that enemies can start firing on the player character when they're too far away to make out, they concluded that "at first glance it may look like another pretty Doom clone, but look closer and you'll see TekWar has enough new angles and ideas to make it stand as a cool game in its own right." They gave it 3 out of 5 stars. A reviewer for Next Generation agreed that Tekwar stands out from other first-person shooters, but felt that the game's nonsensical mechanics outweigh its freshness. He particularly complained that though the police will fire upon the player character if he has his gun drawn in public, they show no reaction if an enemy fires upon the player character, and will actually help gang up on the player character if he tries to defend himself. Concluding that "Only fanatical fans of 'TekWar' or Bill Shatner should get this one, and even they probably won't like it", he gave it 1 out of 5 stars.

== Legacy ==
Around 2006, former Capstone Software programmer Les Bird released the source code of several Capstone games (as Capstone shut down in 1996), among them William Shatner's TekWar. The game is supported by the BuildGDX source port, as well as JFTekWar.
