= IntraCorp =

- Type: Private
- Industry: Video games
- Founded: 1984 (Note: Other sources say 1985)
- Defunct: 1996
- Headquarters: Miami, Florida
- Number of employees: 30 (1994)
- Subsidiaries: Capstone Software, Three-Sixty Pacific, The Next Move

IntraCorp was a game publisher based in Miami, Florida, founded in 1984.

== History ==
In November 1985, IntraCorp released Love Quest which sold 10,000 copies.

By 1992, the company employed 40 people.

By 1994, the company had sales in excess of $10 million annually.

In December 1994, IntraCorp signed a $1 million deal with U.S. Gold to bring the company's titles in Europe in 1995.

== Games ==
Year	Title
1989	Wall $treet Raider
1993	Grandmaster Chess
1994	Corridor 7: Alien Invasion
1995	William Shatner's TekWar
1995	Witchaven
1995	Chronomaster
1996	Witchaven II: Blood Vengeance
