= Classic Doom =

Classic Doom is a generic term used to refer to any of the games in the Doom series based on the original Doom engine.

It can refer to any of the following:

- Doom
- Doom II
- Final Doom
- Doom 64

== See also ==
- Doom Classic
