= Cacowards =

Award for Doom game modifications

The Cacowards
- Awarded for: Doom modifications of outstanding quality
- Presented by: Doom community, doomworld.com
- First award: 2004; 22 years ago
- Website: www.doomworld.com/cacowards/

The Cacowards are an annual online awards ceremony which honors the year's most prominent "Doom WADs", video game modifications of the 1993 first-person shooter Doom. Such modifications may be single levels, level packs, or "total conversions" featuring gameplay that significantly diverges from traditional Doom. Although generally focusing on classic Doom games (Doom, Doom II, and Doom 64), modifications for other Doom-engine based games such as Heretic, Hexen and Strife have also been featured. Since 2004, the Cacowards have been hosted at doomworld.com, a Doom fansite.

== History ==
In 2003, Doomworld celebrated the 10th anniversary of Doom with "10 Years of Doom", a series of articles and reviews written by Mike "Cyb" Watson and Andrew "Linguica" Stine, discussing the history and legacy of the Doom modding community across the prior decade. The event was continued in 2004 as the Cacowards, with an emphasis on discussing the year's most notable contributions to the Doom modding community. The name of the Cacowards stems from Doom's "Cacodemon" monster, whose likeness is present in the award's design.

== Categories and awards ==
The primary category of the Cacowards is the Top Ten, (Note: Some years use Top Twelve.) which discusses the most notable Doom WADs of the year.

Other common categories include:

- Runners-up
- Honorable mentions
- Multiplayer Awards – For outstanding multiplayer-oriented maps.
- Gameplay Mod Awards – For high-quality mods which modify or transform Doom's core gameplay, such as adding or altering weapons and enemies.
- Codeaward – For the best software. The award was introduced in 2017.
- Mordeth Award – For a released project with the longest development time. The award's name references Mordeth, a total conversion mod for Doom which has been in development since 1997.
- Machaward – For the most creative project. The award was introduced in 2017 and replaced the Mockaward.
- Odyssey of Noises – For outstanding soundtracks and music. Also called the "Dootaward", it was introduced in 2020.
- Most Promising Newcomers – For new Doom modders with outstanding first works.
- Creator of the Year – Awarded to the best content author.
- Adrian's Pen – For best original art. The award was introduced in 2025 and is named after Adrian Carmack.

Some categories have been retired and are no longer awarded:

- Worst WAD – For exceptionally low-quality mods. The award was discontinued in 2011, following concerns that it rewarded low-effort content.
- Mockaward – For the "best comedy WAD of the year"; such WADs are often designed with humorous intent, with a diminished focus on gameplay balance and longevity. The Mockaward category was discontinued in 2017 and replaced with the Machaward.

== Legacy ==
The Cacowards have been critically praised as a resource for high-quality Doom modifications. Commenting on the event, PC Gamer stated: "If you want a direct route to the best Doom maps and mods, the place to go is the Cacowards." Rock, Paper, Shotgun shared a similar sentiment, commenting that the Cacowards are "often a handy pointer towards good and fun new things." Numerous award recipients have received additional commendations by journalists covering the Cacowards, who often review highlights from the year's ceremony.

== Notable winners and runner-ups ==
- Brutal Doom – 2011 "Gameplay Mod" winner
- Sigil – 2019 runner-up
- Sonic Robo Blast 2 – 2019 "Mordeth" winner
- MyHouse.wad – 2023 winner

== See also ==
- Doom modding – Modding in the Doom video game series
- Cyriak (Mouldy) – Winner of 2012, 2014, and 2022 Cacowards
