= Doom modding =

Modding in the Doom video game series

Doom modding is the practice of creating modifications for games in the first-person shooter franchise Doom developed by id Software, such as the original Doom and its sequel, Doom II: Hell on Earth. These modifications allow players to design new levels, change graphics and sounds, and adjust gameplay mechanics.

During the development of Doom, id Software designed the game to be easier to modify and change; game content was separated from the engine itself. Levels, textures, sounds, and other game data were packaged as WAD files. The name "WAD" stands for “Where’s All the Data?”. The WAD format made it possible to create and share new content without patching the game or writing code. There are two types of WADs: internal and patch WADs (IWAD and PWAD). An IWAD contains the data necessary to load the game, while additional PWADs contain add-on data, such as more character sprites, other weapons, and other content. Immediately following Doom's release in 1993, it attracted a sizeable following of players who created and shared WADs.

Following id Software's release of the Doom engine source code in 1997 (and its re-licensing under the GNU GPL in 1999), the community began developing modified versions of the engine called source ports. These expanded the technical limits of the original game and enabled new forms of modding, including advanced scripting, 3D environments, and modern rendering features. As a result, Doom modding has remained very active well past its release date. Although mods exist for later games in the series, such as Doom 3 and Doom Eternal, modding has continued to focus on the first games.

Doom modding is considered a significant portion of Doom's identity, and has played a vital part in making modding more accessible and commonplace in gaming, including games other than first-person shooters. Thousands of mods have been created, ranging from small levels to full original games; most of these are freely shared and downloadable on the internet. Several mods have also been released commercially. Some modders later became professional game developers, with several joining commercial studios.

== History ==
=== Development of Doom ===
When developing Doom, id Software was aware that many players had tried to create custom levels and other modifications for their previous game, Wolfenstein 3D, but the procedures involved in creating and loading modifications for that game were cumbersome.

John Carmack, the lead programmer at id Software, designed the Doom internals from the ground up to allow players to extend the game. In particular, game assets, levels, and other content was separated from the engine in WAD files. Tom Hall is responsible for coming up with the name WAD.

The idea of making Doom easily modifiable was primarily backed by Carmack, a well-known supporter of copyleft and the hacker ideal of people sharing and building upon each other's work, and by John Romero, who had hacked games in his youth and wanted to allow other gamers to do the same. In contrast, some video game artists, including Jay Wilbur and Kevin Cloud, objected due to legal concerns and the belief that it would not be of any benefit to the company's business.

=== Utilities and first mods ===
Immediately after the initial shareware release of Doom on December 10, 1993, players began working on various tools to modify the game. On January 26, 1994, Brendon Wyber released the first public domain version of the Doom Editing Utility (DEU) program on the Internet, a program for creating new levels. DEU continued development until May 21. It was made possible by Matt Fell's release of the Unofficial Doom specifications. Shortly thereafter, Doom players became involved with further enhancing DEU. Raphaël Quinet spearheaded the program's development efforts and overall project release, while Steve Bareman led the documentation effort and creation of the DEU Tutorial. More than 30 other people also helped with the effort and their names appear in the README file included with the program distribution. Yadex, a fork of DEU 5.21 for Unix systems running the X Window System, was later released under the GNU GPL license. Carmack released the source code for the utilities used to create the game, but these were programmed in Objective-C, for NeXT workstations, and were therefore not directly usable by the mass userbase of IBM PC compatible.

Jeff Bird is credited with creating the first custom WAD for Doom, called Origwad, on March 7, 1994. Soon, many players were creating custom WADs and sharing them over AOL, the CompuServe forums, and other Internet-based channels. Many of the WADs were made in the style of the base game, others were based on existing TV series, films, or original themes. Some of the id Software staff were impressed by some of the WADs; John Carmack later said the following about a Star Wars-themed modification:

I still remember the first time I saw the original Star Wars DOOM mod. Seeing how someone had put the Death Star into our game felt so amazingly cool. I was so proud of what had been made possible, and I was completely sure that making games that could serve as a canvas for other people to work on was a valid direction.

— John D. Carmack

Another early modification is Aliens TC, a total conversion based on the film Aliens.

Although the WAD format allowed modifying the game to a higher degree that most others, the amount of customization was still limited. Much of the game's behavior, such as the timing of enemies and strength of weapons, was hard-coded in the Doom executable file and impossible to alter via WADs. DeHackEd, a Doom editing program created by Greg Lewis, addressed this by letting users modify parameters inside the Doom executable itself, allowing for a greater degree of customization.

=== Commercial mods ===
Around 1994 and 1995, mods were distributed primarily through BBSs and via CD collections found in computer shops or bundled together with instruction guides for level creation. In later years, FTP servers became the primary method for obtaining these works. Although the Doom software license required that no profit be made from custom WADs (and with Shawn Green objecting to people selling their mods), some WAD sets and shovelware bundles were nonetheless sold at certain outlets.

To compete with unauthorized collection CDs, id Software also began hiring and recruiting particularly talented modders in the Doom community to create official expansions. The team produced Master Levels, an expansion pack containing 21 levels. It was released on December 26, 1995, on a CD, along with Maximum Doom, a collection of 1,830 other mods that had been downloaded from the internet. During this time, id Software was also working on their next game, Quake.

In 1996, Final Doom, a package of two 32 level megawads created by TeamTNT, was released as an official id Software product.

Various first-person shooter games released at the time use the Doom engine under a commercial license from id Software, such as HacX: Twitch 'n Kill (1997). In some instances, these are simply custom WADs packaged with the Doom engine.

In addition to the many people who contributed to commercially released mods, various authors became involved with the development of other games:

- Kenneth Scott, who contributed artwork to HacX, later became the art director at id Software and 343 Industries on the post-Bungie Halo games.
- Tim Willits, who contributed two levels to Master Levels for Doom II, later became the lead designer at id Software.
- Sverre Kvernmo, designer of five levels in Master Levels for Doom II and member of TeamTNT, was hired by Ion Storm for Daikatana.
- Dario Casali, author of a quarter of Final Doom, was hired by Valve to work on Half-Life.
- Iikka Keränen, author of several Doom and later Quake mods, was hired by Ion Storm to create levels for Anachronox and Daikatana, and by Looking Glass Studios to create levels for Thief II: The Metal Age. Keränen was later hired by Valve.
- John Anderson, also known as "Dr. Sleep", level designer of five levels in Master Levels for Doom II and E4M7 in The Ultimate Doom, later worked on Blood, Unreal, and Daikatana.
- Matthias Worch, a level designer, joined Ritual Entertainment to work on SiN. He later contributed to the Unreal series.
- James Paddock, who has composed music and designed levels for many mods, has composed for SIGIL.

=== Source port era ===
Around 1997, interest in Doom mods began to decline, as attention was drawn to newer games with more advanced technology and more customizable design, including id Software's own Quake and Quake II, but a dedicated following continued into the new century, with modern Doom modding becoming more popular than Quake modding.

On December 23, 1997, id Software released the source code to the Doom engine, initially under a restrictive license. On October 3, 1999, it was released again under the terms of the GNU GPL-2.0-or-later. With the source code available, it became possible for programmers to modify any aspect of the game, remove technical limitations and bugs, and add entirely new features.

These engine modifications, or Doom source ports, have since become the focus for much of the WAD editing activity, and with the decline of MS-DOS, using a source port became the only feasible way for most people to play Doom. Many source ports exist, and several are in active development.

== Notable mods ==
Since their releases, many Doom mods have been created. Some have acquired fame even outside of the modding community. The following is a select listing of popular and historically significant mods.

The types of mods are:

Level
A level, usually retaining the theme of the original game, but possibly including new music and some modified graphics to define a more distinctive setting or mood. Both single-player and deathmatch multiplayer levels are common. There are 27 levels in Doom, 32 in Doom II, and 36 in The Ultimate Doom.
Joke WAD
A mod made as a joke. Some joke WADs are parodies, intentionally poorly designed, or have content otherwise unrelated to Doom.
Episode replacement
A mod that is intended to replace an individual episode of Doom. They typically contain 9 levels. Some mods may include more than one episode replacement.
Megawad
A mod that contains at least 15 levels. The term comes from a mod called "MegaWAD", which was a compilation of many other mods. The term gradually became to mean a large modding project.
Total conversions, partial conversions
A mod that overhauls the game to incorporate an entirely different game setting, character set, and story, instead of simply providing new levels or graphic changes. The phrase was coined by Justin Fisher, as part of the title of Aliens TC, or Aliens Total Conversion. Add-ons that provide extensive changes to a similar degree but retain distinctive parts or characteristics of the original games, such as characters or weapons, are often by extension called partial conversions.

=== Levels ===
- The Harris levels: Created by Eric Harris, one of the two perpetrators of the Columbine High School massacre. It is believed to have surfaced on the internet in 1996 or 1997, but it was removed by the FBI after the 1999 massacre. Downloads for the levels Deathmatching in Bricks (BRICKS.WAD), Hockey.wad (HOCKEY.WAD), KILLER (KILLER.WAD), Mortal Kombat Doom (FIGHTME.WAD), Outdoors (outdoors.wad), Station (STATION.WAD), and UAC Labs (UACLABS.WAD) have been found since. Dylan Klebold, a friend of Harris and the other perpetrator of the massacre, was credited by Harris for playtesting Deathmatching in Bricks. The ending screen for UAC Labs shows names of other levels made by Harris, although they are since lost: Assault, Techout, Thrasher, Realdeth, and Realdoom, a patch for another WAD. UAC Labs mentioned in Doomworld's Top 10 Infamous WADs list.
- Lullaby: A level created by Danlex in 2021 which contained surreal visuals.
- MyHouse.wad: Created by Doomworld user Steve Nelson (Veddge) in March 2023. It is a liminal horror map loosely inspired by the 2000 novel House of Leaves by Mark Z. Danielewski, and the online urban legend the Backrooms. It has been praised as one of Doom II's most technologically advanced mods.
- National Videogame Museum: A recreation of the real life National Videogame Museum by employee Chris Bacarani. The level took over a year to make, and is featured as an exhibit in the physical museum.
- Nuts!: Released in 2001, it is one of the first documented "joke WADs". It consists of a single room, with an invulnerability power up, plasma rifle, BFG, and 10,617 monsters. Its creator, B.P.R.D., created multiple sequels, including a version of Nuts recreated in Dusk.
- Origwad: Created by Jeff Bird and released on March 7, 1994, it's notable for being the first custom WAD to be released for Doom. It consists of a single level with two rooms separated by one door, and a total of six enemies, making it extremely basic.
- Void: A single-level modification created by Mike Watson (Cyb) based on the 2000 game American McGee's Alice, itself made by former id Software employee American McGee.

=== Megawads ===
- Alien Vendetta: Created by a mapping group led by Anders Johnson in 2001. It is widely acclaimed by the Doom community. Doomworld writer Cyb later called it the "last great classical megawad” in a "10 Years of Doom" article. It contains what Doomworld deemed to be the most memorable map of all time, "Misri Halek" by Kim Andre Malde.
- Bloom: A Doom II and Blood crossover released in 2021. It features over 50 new enemies, a new episode, and an original soundtrack.
- D!Zone: An expansion pack created by WizardWorks. It features hundreds of levels for Doom and Doom II. In a review for Dragon by Jay & Dee in the "Eye of the Monitor" column, Jay gave the pack 1 out of 5 stars, while Dee gave the pack 1 1/2 stars.
- Eternal Doom: Created by Team Eternal and TeamTNT. Released non-commercially in several versions, with the final one on November 14, 1997. It received media attention in 2020 when it was played through a modded Doom Eternal.
- Going Down: Created by animator Cyriak Harris and released in 2013. It was a winner in the 2013 Cacowards.
- Icarus: Alien Vanguard: Created by TeamTNT and released on March 22, 1996. It was developed as freeware after TNT: Evilution was used by id Software for Final Doom.
- Memento Mori: Created by Denis and Thomas Möller, Tom Mustaine, and Dario and Milo Casali. It was initially released on December 10, 1995, and saw an updated release in February 1996. A 32-level sequel, Memento Mori II, was created and released on July 27, 1996. In Doomworld's Top 100 WADs of All Time, Memento Mori voted as the No. 1 WAD of 1996, and its sequel as #2.
- Requiem: Created by the authors of Memento Mori, in addition to some new mappers that worked specifically on this project. It was released on July 4, 1997.
- Sigil and Sigil II: In 2016, John Romero released two new maps – Phobos Mission Control and Tech Gone Bad. After the positive response, Romero released Sigil, a complete 9-level episode, in May 2019. He later followed it up with a sequel, Sigil II.

=== Total conversions ===
- Action Doom 2: Urban Brawl: A 2008 indie game developed by "Scuba Steve" Browning with the ZDoom source port. It features cel-shaded graphics reminiscent of a comic book, and played in the style of a beat 'em up.
- Aliens TC: Based on the film Aliens, it was created by Justin Fisher and released on November 3, 1994. In 2017, another modder by the name of Kontra_Kommando made a remake of Aliens TC.
- Ashes 2063: A post-apocalypse mod created by Vostyok released in 2015. It is inspired by 1980s post-apocalyptic films. It features new enemies, weapons, and an original soundtrack. It features single player campaigns with branching storylines.
- Batman Doom: Created by ACE Team Software and released in April 1999. It is themed after the world of Batman.
- Chex Quest: Released in 1996 by Digital Café for younger audiences. It originally packaged in Chex cereal boxes as a prize, and later put up as freeware on the internet after the promotion ended. It received two sequels, Chex Quest 2: Flemoids Take Chextropolis and Chex Quest 3, released in 1997 and 2008, respectively, both of which contained five levels and were released as freeware.
- Doom 64: Retribution: A remake of Doom 64, the Nintendo 64 version of Doom, which differs drastically from its PC version.
- Grezzo 2: Created by Italian game designer Nicola Piro and released in 2012. It was notable for plagiarizing other games and Doom mods, and for its vulgar, blasphemous content.
- Pirate Doom: Created by Darch in 2013. It features a Caribbean pirate theme and is considered a partial conversion. A sequel, Pirate Doom II, was released in 2024.
- Sonic Robo Blast 2: A third-person platformer based on Sonic the Hedgehog, released in 2003. In 2018, Sonic Robo Blast 2 Kart, a kart racing game based on the game, was released as a separate game.

=== Miscellaneous ===
- The Sky May Be: A joke WAD; most of the game takes place in an oversized sector, where many textures are replaced with solid colors, and many sounds are replaced with audio from Monty Python's Flying Circus. It is listed in Doomworld's The Top 10 Infamous WADs list and it considered to be one of the worst mods ever created.
- UAC Military Nightmare: A mod for Skulltag created by "Terry" in 2008. It is notorious for its use of vulgarity, jump scares, strange graphics, absurd difficulty, and otherwise-useless data that existed to either bloat the mod's file size or tamper with the player's settings. It was removed from Doomworld in 2014 due to this extraneous data, but has since been re-uploaded with this data removed. It spawned a genre of WADs known as "Terrywads", or "Terry Traps", which contain similar content. In 2008, it received a Cacoward for Worst WAD, where it is described as "the worst wad file the world has ever known".
- Lilith: Created in 2017. It uses glitches in the ZDoom source port to create graphical and musical distortion, and changes in enemy behavior, resulting in a "glitchcore nightmare". It was a winner in the 2017 Cacowards.

=== Freedoom ===
Freedoom

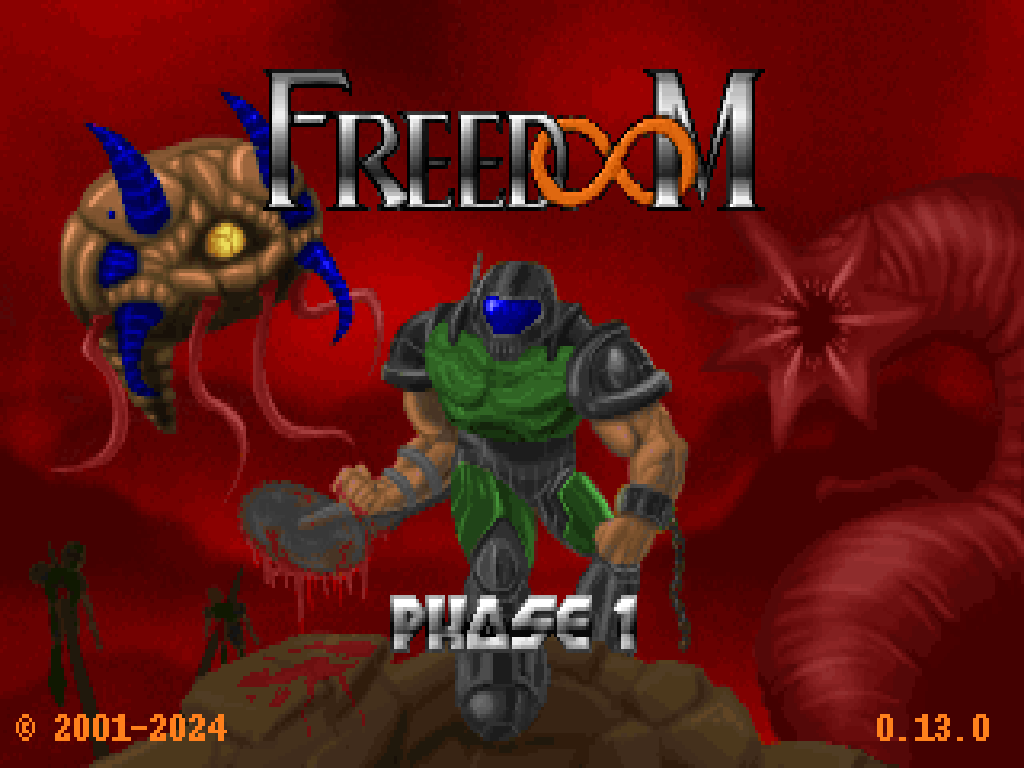
- Phase 1 title screen (v0.13.0)
- Original author: Various contributors
- Release: 16 April 2003; 23 years ago
- Stable release: 0.13.0 / 29 January 2024; 2 years ago
- Platform: Linux, Microsoft Windows, macOS, MS-DOS, Android
- Type: Single-player, multiplayer first-person shooter
- License: 3-clause BSD (requires a Doom engine source port under the GNU GPL-2.0-or-later to play)
- Website: https://freedoom.github.io/

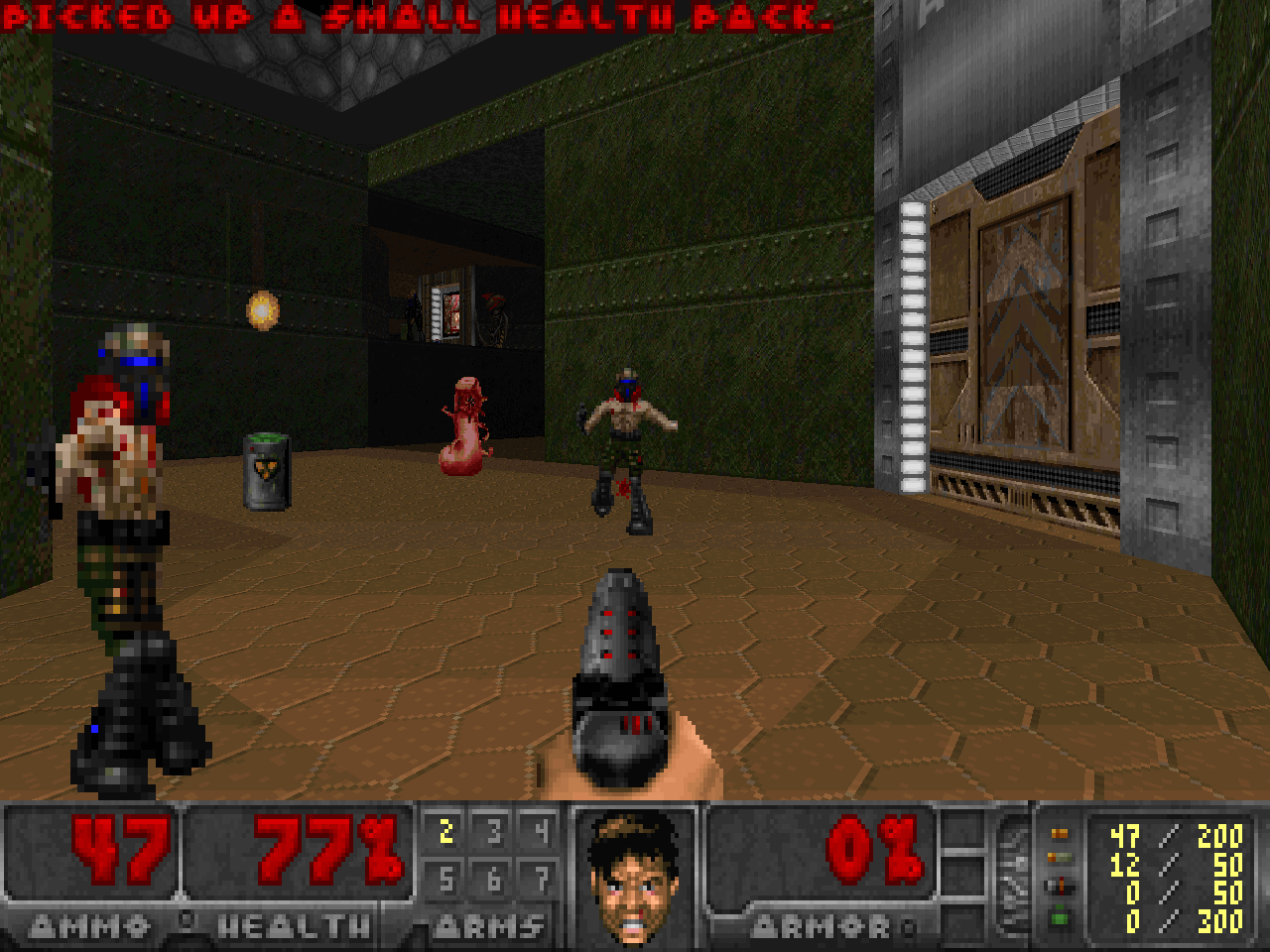
Screenshot from Freedoom

Freedoom is a project aiming to create a free replacement for the graphics, music, sound effects, levels, and other resources used by Doom. Since the engine is free software (but its assets are not), it can be distributed along with Freedoom, to provide a fully free game. It is licensed under a modified 3-clause BSD license.

The project distributes three IWAD files: the two single-player campaigns named Freedoom: Phase 1 and Freedoom: Phase 2, and FreeDM, which contains a collection of deathmatch levels. Originally a Boom-oriented mapset, it was later made merely limit-removing, and finally fully vanilla compatible, allowing play through the original executable and conservative ports like Chocolate Doom.

Other similar "free replacement" projects exist. Blasphemer aims to create a complete free version of Heretic, but is less fully developed than Freedoom, from which it has recycled assets. Currently three episodes are drafted and a deathmatch set called BlasphDM is available. Zauberer and Lastermaul are projects targeting Hexen, as well as Animosity for Strife and Freedom Scoops for Chex Quest.

== Editors ==
Many level editors are available for Doom. The original Doom Editing Utility (DEU) was ported to various operating systems, but lost significance over time; many modern Doom editors still have their roots in DEU and its editing paradigm, including DETH, DeePsea, Linux Doom Editor, and Yadex (and its fork Eureka). Other level editors include WadAuthor, Doom Builder (released in January 2003), Doom Builder 2 (released in May 2009 as the successor to Doom Builder), GZDoom Builder (released in March 2012), and Doom Builder X (released in September 2017). Some Doom level editors, such as Doom Builder family feature a 3D editing mode. As of now, these variants have been discontinued, but a newer fork has been released and is regularly updated, known as Ultimate Doom Builder.

== WAD2 and WAD3 formats ==
In Quake, WAD files were replaced with PAK files. WAD files still remain in Quake files, though their use is limited to textures. Since WAD2 and WAD3 use a slightly larger directory structure, they are incompatible with Doom.

== See also ==
- Quake modding – Modding in the Quake video game series
- The Dark Mod – Open source stealth video game

== Bibliography ==
- Joseph Bell, David Skrede: The Doom Construction Kit: Mastering and Modifying Doom, Waite Group Press (April 1, 1995), ISBN 1-57169-003-4
- Richard H. "Hank" Leukart, III: The Doom Hacker's Guide, Mis Press (March 1, 1995), ISBN 1-55828-428-1
- Steve Benner, et al.: 3D Game Alchemy for Doom, Doom II, Heretic and Hexen, SAMS Publishing (1996), ISBN 0-672-30935-1
- Kushner, David: Masters of Doom: How Two Guys Created an Empire and Transformed Pop Culture, Random House Publishing Group 2003, ISBN 0-375-50524-5; pages 166–169
- Larsen, Henrik: The Unofficial Master Levels for Doom II FAQ, version 1.02 (retrieved October 4, 2004)
