= Selaco =

2024 video game developed by Altered Orbit Studios

Selaco is a first-person shooter game developed developed by Altered Orbit Studios with the involvement of Satsuma Audio, which launched in early access on Steam on May 31, 2024.

== Plot ==
The protagonist, Dawn, is the head of security for an underground facility on a devastated Earth—a complex that comes under alien attack.

== Development ==
The game launched in 2024 with its first three chapters. It is based on GZDoom (a source port of the Doom engine)—which provides support for modern operating systems, OpenGL, higher-resolution textures, and additional features for the level editor.

== Reception ==
DigitalFoundry wrote that the game was "A beautiful fusion of FEAR, System Shock 2 and the original Doom". Kotaku wrote that Selaco was "better Than Most AAA Shooters". Rock Paper Shotgun were impressed abut the "GZDoom wizardry" in the game

== See also ==
- List of Doom ports
