= Chex Quest =

1997 video game

- Developer: Digital Café
- Publisher: General Mills
- Directors: Mike Koenigs (technical director); Dean Hyers (creative director)
- Producer: Virtual Communications
- Artist: Charles Jacobi
- Composer: Andrew Benson
- Engine: Doom engine
- Platforms: MS-DOS; Microsoft Windows
- Release: NA: 1997
- Genre: First-person shooter
- Modes: Single-player, multiplayer

Chex Quest is a non-violent first-person shooter video game released in 1997 by Digital Café. It was originally intended as a Chex cereal promotion aimed at children aged 6–9 and up. It is a total conversion of the more explicitly violent video game Doom (specifically The Ultimate Doom). Chex Quest won both a Golden EFFIE Award for Advertising Effectiveness and Golden Reggie Award for Promotional Achievement in 1998. It is known for being the first ever video game to be included as a cereal box prize.

The game had developed a cult following, which has been described as being composed of “unusually devoted” fans. In 2019, General Mills re-released Chex Quest, as well as its previously unofficial 2008 sequel, and produced a mini-documentary available on YouTube.

== Gameplay ==
The Chex Warrior "zorching" a Flemoid. Note the lack of lurid violence and gore.

Originally based on the Doom engine, the gameplay present in Chex Quest is substantially identical to its predecessor. The game is played in a first person perspective with the player character navigating through quasi-3D environments while enemies attempt to attack and immobilize him. Along the way, various cereal-themed power-ups, weapons, and ammunition can be found that can boost the player character's health and make him better able to counterattack or flee his enemies. When the final boss is defeated in the last level, the game is won.

A few notable differences from Doom are evident, however, regarding enemy profiles (specifically the loss of long-range attacks in low-level enemies and the loss of movement in high-level enemies) and the number of levels in each world (restricted to 5 levels in Chex Quest).

== Plot ==
Set on a distant planet named Bazoik, the game follows the Chex Warrior, a soldier clad in a Chex-shaped suit of armor, as he foils the invasion of the planet by the 'Flemoids': a species of slimy, green invertebrates, who have infested the planet and captured many helpless colonists, whom the Chex Warrior must save. His main weapons are devices called "zorchers", which teleports his enemies to their home dimension. The game starts at the landing pad of the research center on Bazoik; other levels include the laboratory, the arboretum, and finally, the caverns of Bazoik, where the Flemoids have established their colony. Their principal weapon is the use of mucus as a projectile.

== Development ==
Produced with a small team of developers on a budget of around $500,000, Chex Quest was created by the WatersMolitor promotion agency, which had been hired by Ralston Foods (Note: Although WatersMolitor was hired by Ralston, Ralston's subsequent sale to General Mills in 1996 meant that Chex Quest would eventually be released under the General Mills name.) to promote the Chex cereal brand. The original game concept was created by Dean Hyers and Mike Koenigs as a non-violent CD-ROM computer game to be released with 5.7 million boxes of Rice Chex, Wheat Chex, and Corn Chex cereals in order to cast Chex as a cereal that was exciting and fun for children while appealing to modern sensibilities by targeting home PC owners. The game would be a high-quality program whose normal retail value would be between $30 and $35. However, it would be offered to consumers for free with no increase to the cost of the cereal box.

The development of Chex Quest differed from traditional video game development in that the basic game engine had already been created and the bulk of the creation process consisted of aesthetic changes made to the music and artwork from The Ultimate Doom. For budgetary reasons, Id Software was contacted and an inexpensive license was obtained for the Doom engine which was considered obsolete in light of Id's then-recent release of Quake. Chex Quest was the first foray into professional game development for lead artist Charles Jacobi and programmer Scott Holman, though both had previously modified Doom levels in the past. In an interview with PC Gamer magazine in 2009, Jacobi stated that the biggest reason for the lasting success of Chex Quest has been that it is still essentially a disguised version of Doom with basically unaltered game dynamics. Indeed, the game has been recognized for having a sense of humor about its identity and origins.

Humorous aspects of the conversion take the form of ironic in-jokes related to Doom resulting from the more or less exact "translation" of previous non-essential Doom decorations into their non-essential Chex Quest equivalents. Thus the bloodied bodies and the twitching torsos from Doom become the goo-covered cereal pieces and the cereal victims twitching to extract themselves from goo in Chex Quest. Likewise, according to the plot the "health" meter represents the Chex Warrior's ability to move, with 0% representing being completely covered in slime and unable to move. The picture of the Chex Warrior in the status bar display becomes progressively more coated in slime, as opposed to bleeding as does Doomguy's face in the Doom status bar. Because time was limited, preexisting tools popular with the Doom fan community (such as the level creation tool Doombuilder) were utilized in level design, and sound effects such as the distinctive vocalization of the Flemoids were created by creative director Dean Hyers and audio designer Andrew Benson playing around in a sound booth.

During development, aesthetic decisions had to be run by Ralston for approval and this resulted in a number of modifications. The zorchers, for instance, were originally intended to look like a classic raygun, though they were changed to look like a remote control or Star Trek tricorder due to Ralston's concerns that it looked too much like a violent gun. All of the higher-powered weapons were then designed on the tricorder model. However, the Zorch launcher and Phasing Zorcher were modified again toward the end of the design phase to have a more distinctive look. Zorch weapons were also originally going to "neutralize" flemoids with nutritional foods like banana slices, milk, and strawberries, but due to Ralston's worries that this might encourage food fighting, this was changed so that the zorcher emitted pink light and "sent back" the flemoids to their own dimension, making them vanish. Early designs for the Chex Warrior also had his head and body all as one giant Chex piece. However, this was changed due to aesthetic similarities to the M&M's animated characters. The flemoids were originally yellow, but this was changed to green due to limitations in the Doom color palette.

Additional development team members include: Producer Kimberly Hyers, Technical Coordinator Dave Brus, and Project Manager Mary Bregi.

=== Promotion ===
In support of the promotion, coupons and advertisements were included in newspapers and magazines with total circulation of forty-two million; promotional art was added to the front of all boxes containing the game; a 30-second television advertisement was broadcast; and a website (chexquest.com) was launched to present game tips, Chex recipes, and further plot details such as character biographies. To cut down on development costs, WatersMolitor formed a promotional partnership with America Online who actually manufactured the C.D.s in exchange for which all copies of Chex Quest came bundled with the AOL software and a "50 Free Hours" subscription offer. WatersMolitor also created a telephone help-line for gamers who encountered problems with the game and hired fledgling new media company, Digital Café, to provide coding, plot, animations, original music and art for the game.

=== Comparison with Doom ===
Some parameters used to start Doom are also used to start Chex Quest. Despite Chex Quest's major changes from its predecessor, there are still a few remaining relics (e.g. levels from other Ultimate Doom episodes and some in-game text).

While Doom has a cheat code scheme in which every cheat starts with "id", the codes in Chex Quest are based on the names of the people in the production crew of the game, with a few exceptions. PC speaker sound effects from the MS-DOS version of Doom have been modified and are used in Chex Quest. Whereas Doom is rated M for Mature, Chex Quest was made to be a child-friendly game for all audiences. Nearly all of the graphics and audio from Doom have been replaced, from textures to enemies to weapons.

==== Left-over levels ====
Chex Quest has only the first five levels from The Ultimate Doom converted for the game. Some left-over levels are playable (as Chex Quest conversions) only via the level warp parameter at startup. These left-over levels include maps 6 through 9 from episode 1 as well as all maps in episodes 2, 3 and 4. In these levels the music reverts to the original score from Ultimate Doom. After the level warp parameter is used to access maps E3M1 or E4M1, the remainder of the levels (through map 5) within the episode selected can be accessed by completing the levels in the episode in order (just as with the standard level progression in Doom or Chex Quest). Unfortunately, bugs prevent any of the other levels from launching upon completion of the level before it, and similarly E4M9 cannot be reached from E4M2 as previously. Completion of E2M5 (via either exit) displays the end graphic originally displayed at the end of The Shores Of Hell, the second episode of the original Doom, and completing E3M5 displays the end sequence from Inferno, the third episode. Likewise, completing E4M5 displays the end graphic from Thy Flesh Consumed, the fourth and final episode of The Ultimate Doom. Both of the latter two end sequences feature a decapitated rabbit named Daisy.

The intermission screen shown after completing E2M5

Episode intermission texts which originally (i.e. in Doom) were displayed upon completion of E1M8, E2M8, E3M8, and E4M8 are now found in modified form for Chex Quest. Thus completion of E1M5 in Chex Quest now displays the new message: "MISSION ACCOMPLISHED. ARE YOU PREPARED FOR THE NEXT MISSION? PRESS THE ESCAPE KEY TO CONTINUE..." Completion of the left-over level E2M5 displays the message: "YOU'VE DONE IT!" which never appears in The Ultimate Doom. Likewise, the episode intermission text displayed upon completion of E3M5 reads: "WONDERFUL JOB!", and that displayed upon completion of E4M5 reads: "FANTASTIC" again neither of which ever appeared in the original game. Charles Jacobi has said that there were never any plans to produce more than five levels and that he knew Scott Holman, another programmer, ran through the text strings and changed any that seemed inappropriate, without knowing where they went.

The skins for the more difficult enemies from Doom have not been converted as these enemies were not employed in Chex Quest levels, but rather the skins have been removed entirely. This introduces an additional experience for those playing the "left-over levels" as these difficult enemies still exist in a completely invisible form. This also goes for items like the partial invisibility, berserker pack, light amp goggles, and all skull keycards. In addition, the music from the original registered Doom as well as the overworld graphics (depicting Gigeresque scenes of death and hell) and maps that were not modified (E1M6 through E4M9) were left intact, allowing anyone with WAD file-editing knowledge to create one's own copy of registered Doom (specifically The Ultimate Doom).

== Reception and legacy ==
Reception

Review score
Publication	Score
AllGame	3/5

On release, the game was received largely positively by players. Consumers of diverse ages gave enthusiastic feedback, and there were many requests for the development of sequels. Corporate sales of Chex cereal also saw a tremendous boost with incremental volume over base increasing by 295% and volume share increasing 48% from the previous year. These increases were directly attributed to the release of Chex Quest, and General Mills deemed the promotion "highly successful." Although the promotion only lasted 6 weeks, the game continued to be played well beyond the promotional period and promotional marketing groups considered the brand image to have been revitalized "from old-fashioned and stodgy to exciting, fun and modern."

Despite this, what little critical attention Chex Quest received in the video game press tended to be negative. Comparisons of the game to its forerunner (Doom) and to other similar games of the day were often unfavorable to Chex Quest, which was pejoratively labeled a "Doom clone", and the game was regarded as an imitation with little to no innovation. Noted cereal scholar Scott Bruce decried General Mills' decision to invent a new mascot for Chex cereal for such frivolous purposes, and dismissed the Chex Warrior as not compelling enough to sell the product.

In modern times, Chex Quest is often considered to have been highly innovative and to have pioneered the use of licensed modding to insert product placement into established titles. Although at least 5 million copies were released, the original CDs are uncommon on the secondary market as they were noted by collectors as having great collectible value in the mid-1990s. The game has attracted a sizeable cult following, and its fanbase has been noted with interest by critics for the continued devotion to the game despite its great age. Other critics, however, have characterized the game as bad even for a Doom clone.

In a retrospective review, AllGame editor Jonathan Sutyak referred to Chex Quest as "a good game", and that it is suitable for a "child who might enjoy a first-person shooter but is not ready for the violence that occurs in most games of this genre".

=== Sequels ===
==== Chex Quest 2: Flemoids Take Chextropolis ====
Digital Café's sequel entitled Chex Quest 2: Flemoids Take Chextropolis was simultaneously made freely available for gamers to download from the Chex Quest homepage. Developed on an even tighter schedule than the original game, Chex Quest 2 was rushed to completion and consequently the level design and progression notably suffered. Plans were drafted to allow individual WAD file levels and updates to the game to be posted on the company Web site as an effective way of generating traffic there, and an end sequence suggesting a possible third installation was available for viewing. Before a third title in the series was developed, the promotion came to an end and both the original Chex Quest and Chex Quest 2 became effectively unavailable until they were posted for download on Internet fan pages several years later. A number of fangame editions were completed by fans to act as the third game in the series. However, nearly a decade would pass before a second official sequel was released.

In this sequel's plot, the Chex Warrior returns to his home planet and lands in Chex City only to discover that the Flemoid threat has reached his homeworld. There, the player battles through a terrestrial spaceport, a cinema (showing three videos each endlessly looping), a museum, and the eponymous city (Chextropolis), until reaching the sewers to confront an end boss named "The Maximus".

==== Chex Quest 3: Invasion! ====
In 2008, Chex Quest 3: Invasion! was developed and released as a service to fans by former Digital Café members Charles Jacobi (art director and lead artist) and Scott Holman (programmer). Former Digital Café sound design leader Andrew Benson also contributed several songs for the game. Originally intended as a single standalone level, Jacobi announced the development of a full sequel at the Chex Quest Fan Page (Chexquest.org) in June 2008, and the full game was released in September of the same year. Chex Quest 3 employs the ZDoom source port (version 2.3.1), and is considerably larger in size than the previous two games. Jacobi's release of Chex Quest 3 also included ZDoom-based versions of Chex Quest and Chex Quest 2, with significant enhancements and noted problems redressed. Chex Quest 2 in particular had been remastered, with some levels significantly revised or completely overhauled. Charles Jacobi credited the praise and compliments of fans, especially through fan-made projects such as one titled "The Ultimate Chex Quest", as inspiration to complete this project.

The plot for this sequel is set ten years later than the events of the first two Chex Quest games, with the invasion of the planet Ralston by the Flemoids. The breadth of the story was expanded to a much larger scale, possessing a seemingly more grim scenario than the predecessors—the latter of which Charles Jacobi dispelled as unintentional, in that he simply "wanted it to feel bigger" than the first two games.

==== Chex Quest HD ====
In response to an interview question regarding the possibility of a canonical Kickstarter-funded Chex Quest 4, Jacobi pointed out that the franchise is owned by General Mills so a funded project would likely violate copyright and trademark laws. However, freely distributed non-tarnishing modifications created by hobbyists would probably be protected as free speech.

In 2016, Jacobi revealed that a high definition remake of the original game called Chex Quest HD was in development using Unreal Engine 4 with the permission of General Mills. A trailer for the remake was released in February 2019. Like the original game it contains five levels and was released for free. The Chex Warrior, the protagonist of the original game, is given the name Fred Chexter in the remake.

The remake was released on May 18, 2020, and can be acquired through Steam. It was also released on March 11, 2022, for the Nintendo Switch.

With respect to the legal rights to the game subsequent to the original creators' purchase by larger companies. These corporate events have made the likelihood of later official sequels rather uncertain.

=== Fanbase ===
Chex Quest has gained a fanbase since its cereal-box release in 1997. Often simultaneous fans of Chex cereal and the Doom series, the active Chex Quest fan community has produced a host of fan-made sequels, and numerous unofficial projects have been undertaken including the Chex Trek series and the Zorchmatch mod. Other examples which have arguably entered the fanon include a fan-made Chex Quest 3 and Chex Quest 4, and such .wad and Game Maker sequels as Return of the Chex Warrior, Chex Quest Project Z, and the Chex Quest platformer. There are fan-made Chex Quest WADs designed for nearly all major Doom source ports, including the original Doom engine.
