= Digital Café =

- Industry: Digital media
- Founded: 1991; 35 years ago in Saint Paul, Minnesota, United States
- Founders: Dean Hyers, Mike Koenigs
- Defunct: October 1998
- Fate: Acquired by Campbell Mithun Esty

Digital Café was a new media company founded in early 1991 by Dean Hyers (creative director) and Mike Koenigs (technical director, foley, web development). It operated for 7 years independently in St. Paul before being acquired in October 1998 as a new Minneapolis-based division of Campbell Mithun Esty (an advertising firm) specializing in programming and design for special-market advertising (promotional games, site design, etc.) similar to Black Widow Games. In 1995, Hyers and Koenigs formed a sister company to Digital Café called Digital Entertainment as a joint venture with Navarre Corporation. Digital Entertainment was then sold to Navarre Corporation in 1996.

In 1999, Digital Café merged with four other similar firms to become Zentropy Partners.

In 2008, Mike Koenigs bought the name and trademarks back and restarted Digital Café as a digital advertising agency, opening a small studio in San Diego. His company specializes in online video advertising and has high-definition cameras, green screen backgrounds, and various digital editing equipment at their disposal.

== Projects and products ==
During its lifespan, Digital Café is best known for developing the Chex Quest series of computer games which have attracted a sizeable cult following. The first game in the series, Chex Quest (or Chex Quest 1), employed the Doom engine as a base and is considered a total conversion. It was released in boxes of Chex cereal as a free promotional in 1996. The promotion was quite successful, increasing sales by 248%, and this practice has since been duplicated several times by other cereal manufacturers. Digital Café released Chex Quest 2 the following year as a free download from their website. Using the same executable files as used to run the original game, Chex Quest 2 could be classified as an add-on mod since it requires the original Chex Quest to run. In 1998, promotional material for Chex Quest 3 was put on the Digital Café website, and plans were drafted to allow updates to the game to be posted on the company Web site as an effective way of generating traffic there. In September 2008, 9 years after Digital Café ceased to exist, Chex Quest 3 was developed and released as a service to fans by former Digital Café members, Charles Jacobi (art director and lead artist) and Scott Holman (programmer).

Between 1995 and 1999, Digital Café was involved in a number of promotional online projects for upcoming movies. These projects included the Godzilla Web Presskit, CD-ROM and Screensaver (1995), the Mystery Science Theater 3000 Movie Web Site, and the Strange Days Movie Presskit (1995) (the first CD-ROM distributed in Rolling Stone). Promotional online projects were also developed for such companies as Energizer (Energizer Bunny Screensaver), BMW (BMW Screensaver), and the Minnesota Zoo (Minnesota Zoo Nagivator).

Several commercial products were also released and targeted toward children or specialty markets. Such products include Virtual Cop I (an interactive CD-ROM comic book "about a criminal working for the cops to fight crime"), Virtual Cop II, BACKSTAGE (an enhanced CD musical series), A&E Biographies (an enhanced CD featuring material from musical celebrities on A&E Biography), Normal Walking (an informational CD-ROM developed for pediatric surgeons), Minnesota Zoo Game (an educational CD-ROM), and ScreamSavers (a series of monster-themed screensavers). XAN and the Cosmic Callbox, an educational game based on Montessori learning principles, was released as a commercial product and marketed to schools.

Digital Café has hosted many prominent figures, including an interview with Tony Robbins.

== Clients ==
Digital Café has done exclusive development for General Mills, BMW, Gramercy Pictures, Energizer Batteries, Sony/Tristar/Columbia Pictures, Pillsbury, St. Paul Pioneer Press, Miller Meester Advertising, 3M, 20th Century Fox, St. Paul Companies, Minnesota Zoo, Trane, Apple Computer, Delux Corporation, Datakey Corporation, SciFi Channel, Mystery Science Theater 3000, John Tesh, Andersen Windows, Domino's Pizza, Land O'Lakes, Healthy Choice, GAMC, AirTouch, Navarre Corporation, and Campbell Mithun Esty.
