= Doom engine =

1993 game engine

- Developers: id Software (John Carmack, John Romero, Dave Taylor)
- Final release: 1.9 / February 1, 1995; 31 years ago
- Written in: C, Assembly language
- Platform: MS-DOS, PC-98, Windows, Mac, Linux, Android, Amiga, NeXTSTEP, NeXT, Jaguar, 32X, PlayStation, 3DO, Nintendo 64, Saturn, Game Boy Advance, Switch, BSD, Unix, others
- Predecessor: Wolfenstein 3D engine
- Successor: Quake engine
- License: GNU GPL-2.0-or-later; 3DO: MIT
- Repository: github.com/id-Software/DOOM

The Doom engine is the game engine used in the id Software video games Doom and Doom II: Hell on Earth. It is also used in Heretic, Hexen: Beyond Heretic, Strife: Quest for the Sigil, Hacx: Twitch 'n Kill, Freedoom, and other games produced by licensees. It was created by John Carmack, with auxiliary functions written by Mike Abrash, John Romero, Dave Taylor, and Paul Radek. Originally developed on NeXT computers, it was ported to MS-DOS and compatible operating systems for Doom's initial release and was later ported to several game consoles and operating systems.

The source code to the Linux version of Doom was released to the public under a license that granted rights to non-commercial use on December 23, 1997, followed by the Linux version of Doom II about a week later on December 29, 1997. The source code was later re-released under the GNU General Public License v2.0 or later on October 3, 1999. The dozens of unofficial Doom source ports that have been created since then allow Doom to run on previously unsupported operating systems and sometimes radically expand the engine's functionality with new features.

Although the engine renders a 3D space, that space is projected from a two-dimensional floor plan. The line of sight is always parallel to the floor, walls must be perpendicular to the floors, and it is not possible to create multi-level structures or sloped areas (floors and ceilings with different angles). Despite these limitations, the engine represented a technological leap from id's previous Wolfenstein 3D engine.

== Game world ==
The Doom engine separates rendering from the rest of the game. The graphics engine runs as fast as possible, but the game world runs at 35 frames per second regardless of the hardware, so multiple players can play against each other using computers of varying performance.

== Level structure ==
A simple setup demonstrating how Doom represents levels internally

Map view in editor

Viewed from the top down, all Doom levels are actually two-dimensional, demonstrating one of the key limitations of the Doom engine: room-over-room is not possible. This limitation, however, has a silver lining: a "map mode" can be easily displayed, which represents the walls and the player's position, much like the first image to the right.

=== Basic objects ===
The base unit is the vertex, which represents a single 2D point. Vertices (or "vertexes" as they are referred to internally) are then joined to form lines, known as "linedefs". Each linedef can have either one or two sides, which are known as "sidedefs". Sidedefs are then grouped together to form polygons; these are called "sectors". Sectors represent particular areas of the level.

=== Sectors ===
Each sector contains a number of properties: a floor height, ceiling height, light level, a floor texture and a ceiling texture. To have a different light level in a particular area, for example, a new sector must be created for that area with a different light level. One-sided linedefs therefore represent solid walls, while two-sided linedefs represent bridge lines between sectors.

=== Sidedefs ===
Sidedefs are used to store wall textures; these are completely separate from the floor and ceiling textures. Each sidedef can have three textures; these are called the middle, upper and lower textures. In one-sided linedefs, only the middle texture is used for the texture on the wall. In two-sided linedefs, the situation is more complex. The lower and upper textures are used to fill the gaps where adjacent sectors have different floor and ceiling heights: lower textures are used for steps, for example. The sidedefs can have a middle texture as well, although most do not; this is used to make textures hang in mid air. For example, when a transparent bar texture is seen forming a cage, this is an example of a middle texture on a two-sided linedef.

== Binary space partitioning ==
Doom makes use of a system known as binary space partitioning (BSP). A tool is used to generate the BSP data for a level beforehand. This process can take quite some time for a large level. It is because of this that it is not possible to move the walls in Doom; while doors and lifts move up and down, none of them ever move sideways.

The level is divided up into a binary tree: each location in the tree is a "node" which represents a particular area of the level (with the root node representing the entire level). At each branch of the tree there is a dividing line which divides the area of the node into two subnodes. At the same time, the dividing line divides linedefs into line segments called "segs".

At the leaves of the tree are convex polygons, where further division of the level is not needed. These convex polygons are referred to as subsectors (or "SSECTORS"), and are bound to a particular sector. Each subsector has a list of segs associated with it.

The BSP system sorts the subsectors into the right order for rendering. The algorithm is fairly simple:

1. Start at the root node.
2. Draw the child nodes of this node recursively. The child node closest to the camera is drawn first using a Scanline algorithm. This can be found from looking at which side of the node's dividing line the camera is on.
3. When a subsector is reached, draw it.

The process is complete when the whole column of pixels is filled (i.e., there are no more gaps left). This ordering ensures that no time is used drawing objects that are not visible and as a result maps can become very large without any speed penalty.

== Rendering ==
=== Drawing the walls ===
Animated comparison of camera rotation in a true 3D environment, left, vs shearing in a 2.5D environment like Doom, right.

All of the walls in Doom are drawn vertically; it is because of this that it is not possible to properly look up and down. It is possible to perform a form of look up/down via "y-shearing", and many modern Doom source ports do this, as well as later games that use the engine, such as Heretic. Y-shearing works by moving the horizon line up and down within the screen, in effect providing a "window" on a taller viewable area. By moving the window up and down, it is possible to give the illusion of looking up and down. However, this will distort the view the further up and down the player looks.

The Doom engine renders the walls as it traverses the BSP tree, drawing subsectors by order of distance from the camera so that the closest segs are drawn first. As the segs are drawn, they are stored in a linked list. This is used to clip other segs rendered later on, reducing overdraw. This is also used later to clip the edges of sprites.

Once the engine reaches a solid (1-sided) wall at a particular x coordinate, no more lines need to be drawn at that area. For clipping the engine stores a "map" of areas of the screen where solid walls have been reached. This allows far away parts of the level which are invisible to the player to be clipped completely.

The Doom graphic format stores the wall textures as sets of vertical columns; this is useful to the renderer, which essentially renders the walls by drawing many vertical columns of textures.

=== Floor and ceiling ===
The system for drawing floors and ceilings ("flats") is less elegant than that used for the walls. Flats are drawn with a flood fill-like algorithm. Because of this, if a bad BSP builder is used, it is sometimes possible to get "holes" where the floor or ceiling bleeds down to the edges of the screen, a visual error commonly referred to as a "slime trail". This is also the reason why if the player travels outside of the level using the noclip cheat, the floors and ceilings will appear to stretch out from the level over the empty space.

The floor and ceiling are drawn as "visplanes". These represent horizontal runs of texture, from a floor or ceiling at a particular height, light level and texture (if two adjacent sectors have exactly the same floor, these can get merged into one visplane). Each x position in the visplane has a particular vertical line of texture which is to be drawn.

Because of this limit of drawing one vertical line at each x position, it is sometimes necessary to split visplanes into multiple visplanes. For example, consider viewing a floor with two concentric squares. The inner square will vertically divide the surrounding floor. In that horizontal range where the inner square is drawn, two visplanes are needed for the surrounding floor.

Doom contained a static limit on the number of visplanes; if exceeded, a "visplane overflow" would occur, causing the game to exit to DOS with one of two errors, "No more visplanes!" or "visplane overflow (128 or higher)". The easiest way to invoke the visplane limit is a large checkerboard floor pattern; this creates a large number of visplanes.

As the segs are rendered, visplanes are also added, extending from the edges of the segs towards the vertical edges of the screen. These extend until they reach existing visplanes. Because of the way this works, the system is dependent on the fact that segs are rendered in order by the overall engine; it is necessary to draw nearer visplanes first, so that they can "cut off" by others further away. If unstopped, the floor or ceiling will "bleed out" to the edges of the screen, as previously described. Eventually, the visplanes form a "map" of particular areas of the screen in which to draw particular textures.

While visplanes are constructed essentially from vertical "strips", the actual low level rendering is performed in the form of horizontal "spans" of texture. After all the visplanes have been constructed, they are converted into spans which are then rendered to the screen. This appears to be a trade off: it is easier to construct visplanes as vertical strips, but because of the nature of how the floor and ceiling textures appear it is easier to draw them as horizontal strips.

=== Things (sprites) ===
Each sector within the level has a linked list of things stored in that sector. As each sector is drawn the sprites are placed into a list of sprites to be drawn. If not within the field of view these are ignored.

The edges of sprites are clipped by checking the list of segs previously drawn. Sprites in Doom are stored in the same column based format as the walls are, which again is useful for the renderer. The same functions which are used to draw walls are used to draw sprites as well.

While subsectors are guaranteed to be in order, the sprites within them are not. Doom stores a list of sprites to be drawn ("vissprites") and sorts the list before rendering. Far away sprites are drawn before close ones. This causes some overdraw but usually this is negligible.

There is a final issue of middle textures on 2-sided lines, used in transparent bars for example. These are mixed in and drawn with the sprites at the end of the rendering process, rather than with the other walls.

== Games using the Doom engine ==
The Doom engine achieved most of its fame as a result of powering the classic first person shooter Doom, and it was used in several other games. It is usually considered that the "Big Four" Doom engine games are Doom, Heretic, Hexen: Beyond Heretic, and Strife: Quest for the Sigil.

=== Games built directly on the Doom engine ===
Year	Title	Developer
1993	Doom	id Software
1994	Doom II: Hell on Earth	id Software
1994	Heretic	Raven Software
1995	Hexen: Beyond Heretic	Raven Software
1996	Final Doom	TeamTNT
1996	Heretic: Shadow of the Serpent Riders	Raven Software
1996	Hexen: Deathkings of the Dark Citadel	Raven Software
1996	Strife: Quest for the Sigil	Rogue Entertainment

=== Games based on the Doom or Doom II code ===
In the 1990s a handful of developers acquired licenses to distribute total conversions of Doom, and following the 1997 source code release a number of standalone titles have been produced in the engine, including freeware, fangames and commercial titles.

Year	Title	Developer
1996	Killing Time (PC)	Logicware
1996	Chex Quest	Digital Café
1997	Doom 64	Midway Studios San Diego
1997	Chex Quest 2: Flemoids Take Chextropolis	Digital Café
1997	HacX	Banjo Software
1999	Batman Doom	ACE Team
2000	Sonic Robo Blast 2	Sonic Team Junior
2003	Freedoom	Freedoom Team
2008	Chex Quest 3	Charles Jacobi
2008	Blasphemer	Blasphemer Team
2008	Action Doom 2: Urban Brawl	Scuba Steve
2009	Harmony	Thomas van der Velden
2010	Mega Man 8-Bit Deathmatch	Cutmanmike
2013	Mayhem Mansion	Logic Obscure Productions
2014	The Adventures of Square	BigBrik Games
2016	Blade of Agony	Daniel Gimmer
2017	Rise of the Wool Ball	MSPaintR0cks
2018	REKKR	Mockingbird Softworks
2018	Annie	SergeJkn
2018	Ashes	Vostyok
2018	Total Chaos	wadaholic
2019	Hocus Pocus Doom	Ravage
2019	Hedon	Zan_HedonDev
2019	Shrine	Scumhead
2020	Project Osiris	ArcturusDeluxe
2021	Castlevania: Simon’s Destiny	batandy
2021	Vomitoreum	Scumhead
2022	Hands Of Necromancy	HON Team
2022	CountryCide	TrenchWork
2022	Project Absentia	Waffle Iron Studios
2022	I Am Sakuya: Touhou FPS Game	Sigyaad Team
2023	Supplice	Mekworx
2023	Venturous	PixelFox
2023	Apocalyptic Vibes	Amanito Computing
2024	Hands of Necromancy 2	HON Team
2024	Beyond Sunset	Metacorp / Vaporware
2024	Selaco	Altered Orbit Studios
2024	Borrowhelen	4-Cube Games
2025	Mala Petaka	Sanditio Bayu, Hellforge Studios
2025	Mohrta	Scumhead, Osiol
2025	Captain Wayne: Vacation Desperation	Ciaran Games LLC, Silver Lining Interactive
2026	Butcher's Summit	TrenchWork
2026	Enigmatic Worlds	Logic Obscure Productions
2026	end of starchild	em essex (a.k.a. MuleNgine)
2026	Divine Frequency	Abraxaes
2026	Caves of Qud	countless bats

== See also ==
- List of game engines
- First-person shooter engine
- id Tech
- Build (game engine)
- Quake engine
- Quake (series)
- List of first-person shooter engines

== Notes ==
- GL nodes specification
- Utilities to edit Doom and Doom2
- Doom engine code review by Fabien Sanglard
