= Sonic Robo Blast 2 =

Sonic the Hedgehog fan game

- Title screen
- Developer: Sonic Team Junior
- Series: Sonic the Hedgehog (unofficial)
- Engine: Doom Legacy
- Platforms: Windows; macOS; Linux; Android; Sega 32X
- Release: Demo 1: November 2000; 1.01: June 19, 2003; 2.0: July 24, 2009; 2.1: March 15, 2014; 2.2: December 7, 2019
- Genre: Platformer
- Modes: Single-player, multiplayer

Sonic Robo Blast 2 (often abbreviated SRB2) is a platform game made within a modified version of id Software's Doom engine. It is a free Sonic the Hedgehog fan game inspired by the original Sega Genesis games that "attempts to recreate their design in 3D", and was the first fan-made 3D Sonic game created. The game has received consistent support throughout its development of over 25 years, which has been attributed to a large modding community.

The game's predecessor, Sonic the Hedgehog Robo-blast!, bears little resemblance to Sonic Robo Blast 2, and was released on February 11, 1998. Sonic Robo Blast 2 started development later on in 1998, and has received updates since then, culminating in the release of version 2.2 in 2019. As of November 2026, its development is ongoing.

== Gameplay ==
A video of Sonic Robo Blast 2 showing Sonic running in the first level of the game, Greenflower Zone Act 1.

Sonic Robo Blast 2 is a 3D platformer that makes use of the Doom Legacy engine's ability to implement floors over other floors, a feature not present in several contemporary Doom ports. Players control one of several characters, Sonic the Hedgehog, Miles "Tails" Prower, Knuckles the Echidna, Amy Rose, Fang the Sniper, or Metal Sonic, and aim to reach the end of each zone and defeat Doctor Eggman. Each zone, divided into two acts, requires the player to run and jump through obstacles, making use of the terrain and one's own momentum to reach the signpost at the end of the act. Each character has unique abilities that allow them to fight Eggman's robots, and in contrast to contemporary 3D Sonic games, the design of each level encourages open-ended exploration and discovery.

Multiplayer is made possible either via local area network or Internet connection, with players racing or cooperating to reach the end of a stage, or battling in a first-person shooter mode.

== Plot ==
Following Doctor Eggman's defeat in the preceding game, Sonic the Hedgehog Robo-blast!, he decides to hide away in an underground bunker for three months. Emerging to fight against Sonic and his friends once again, Eggman is summarily beaten and sent retreating into space, where he discovers the asteroid Black Rock. He makes plans to start building a new battle station there, but not before taunting Sonic and Tails by destroying Greenflower City and heading off to sow destruction across the Zones with his robot armies.

Sonic, Tails, and Knuckles follow Eggman through the Zones, from Greenflower Zone to Black Core Zone out in space, where they race against Metal Sonic and fight Eggman. After defeating Eggman's final mech, Sonic and his friends escape in a capsule as the battlestation explodes.

== Development and releases ==
=== Sonic the Hedgehog Robo-blast! ===
Sonic Robo Blast 2 was preceded by Sonic the Hedgehog Robo-blast!, a 2D platforming game developed by Johnny “Sonikku” Wallbank in 1998. It was initially created in Clickteam's Klik & Play program, but the final game was built with Clickteam's The Games Factory. The game was described as "glitchy and primitive", but provided a conceptual foundation for the sequel, Sonic Robo Blast 2.

=== Sonic Robo Blast 2 ===
The first versions of Sonic Robo Blast 2 were developed by Wallbank in April 1998 as a 2D platformer using The Games Factory, which was quickly determined to be inadequate. Several years prior in 1996, Jeff Read, a Doom modder, had released Sonic the Hedgehog Doom, a mod that replaced the music and main character of Doom with Sonic. Artist and programmer AJ "SSNTails" Freda would develop a modification building upon Read's release with Sonic Doom 2, which inspired the use of a Doom source port as the basis for Sonic Robo Blast 2. Subsequent demos and releases were built off of the Doom Legacy engine, the first of which was released in October 1999. Parallels were drawn to the cancelled game Sonic X-treme due to the style of the 3D platformer and the time frame of the demo's release, which was shortly after the launch of the Dreamcast and Sonic Adventure.

Demo releases continued steadily throughout the 2000s, encouraged by an active modding community, some members of which would end up joining Sonic Team Junior. Among them was character animator Chrispy Pixels, who described the development process in 2007 as "cursed and rushed", though he continues to work on the game ever since, arguing that "[SRB2] represents an alternate path the Sonic series could've taken when transitioning to 3D that's more true to the classic Sonic formula." Wallbank would eventually step down from the development team in 2002. On July 25, 2009, a major update titled Version 2.0 was released, signifying the end of demo releases. The release marked the official departure of Freda from the development team, though work on subsequent releases would be continued by the rest of Sonic Team Junior's staff.

An unofficial port of the game to the 32X, titled Sonic Robo Blast 32X, is currently being developed, led by Freda and Sonic Hacking Community founder Damian “Saxman” Grove. The first demo was made available in December 2024, and a second was released in December 2025.

==== Sonic Robo Blast 2 Kart ====
In 2018, a group of developers collaborating through the SRB2 Message Boards known as Kart Krew Dev released Sonic Robo Blast 2 Kart, a kart racing game built off of the Sonic Robo Blast 2 engine, on Windows, macOS, and Linux systems. The gameplay is similar to Mario Kart 64 and similar Nintendo 64 kart racing games such as Diddy Kong Racing, Lego Racers, and Mickey's Speedway USA. SRB2Kart has characters, powerups and maps based on Sonic the Hedgehog and other Sega franchises. Additionally, players can create their own characters, maps and gametypes.

A sequel, Dr. Robotnik's Ring Racers, formerly known as "Version 2.0", was released on April 24, 2024. Treated as a separate game, it was positively received, though the game's lengthy tutorial was criticized. Changes from previous versions of Sonic Robo Blast 2 Kart include a full single player Grand Prix campaign, the addition of new characters, stages, and items, and game mechanics, notably "trick pads" that allow for the use of different boosts and rings as a currency used for boosts.

== Community ==
Sonic Robo Blast 2 is highly dependent on its community as a consistent source of feedback, and the development team of Sonic Team Junior is formed entirely from volunteers, many of whom were at one point part of the fanbase. Members of the development team have hosted level design competitions, titled the "Official Level Design Contest", annually since 2003, with a break from 2015 to 2020; after this break, the title was changed from "contest" to "collab" to emphasize the collaborative aspect of the event.

== Reception ==
Sonic Robo Blast 2 has been the subject of multiple short-form reviews and received positive reception in various video game publications, including 1Up.com, Kombo, Wireframe, Retro Gamer, PC Zone, and Rock Paper Shotgun. The game was covered most frequently as a novelty during its early stages of development, though it drew additional attention after the release of 2.2 in 2019. The update was recognized by Doomworld with an award for the "released project with the longest "development time"".

The game has been noted most prominently for its longevity, with Dominic Tarason of Rock Paper Shotgun calling it "A real slow-burning labour of love". The slow, over 20-year development period has allowed for the growth of a community that has been described as "utopic", compared to those of other online gaming forums.
