= Chex =

General Mills breakfast cereal

- A box of Corn Chex in 2006
- Product type: Breakfast cereal
- Current owner: General Mills (North America), Kellogg's (South Korea, Singapore)
- Country: United States
- Introduced: 1936; 90 years ago
- Related brands: Shredded Ralston
- Markets: North America, South Korea
- Previous owners: Ralston
- Website: www.chex.com

Chex is an American brand of breakfast cereal currently manufactured by General Mills. It was originally known as Shredded Ralston, first produced in 1936 and owned by Ralston Purina of St. Louis, Missouri, then later renamed Chex in 1950. The Chex brand went with corporate spinoff Ralcorp in 1994 and was then sold to General Mills in 1997. Rival cereal company Kellogg's has the rights to the Chex brand in South Korea and Singapore.

The name "Chex" reflects the square checkerboard logo of Ralston Purina.

== History ==
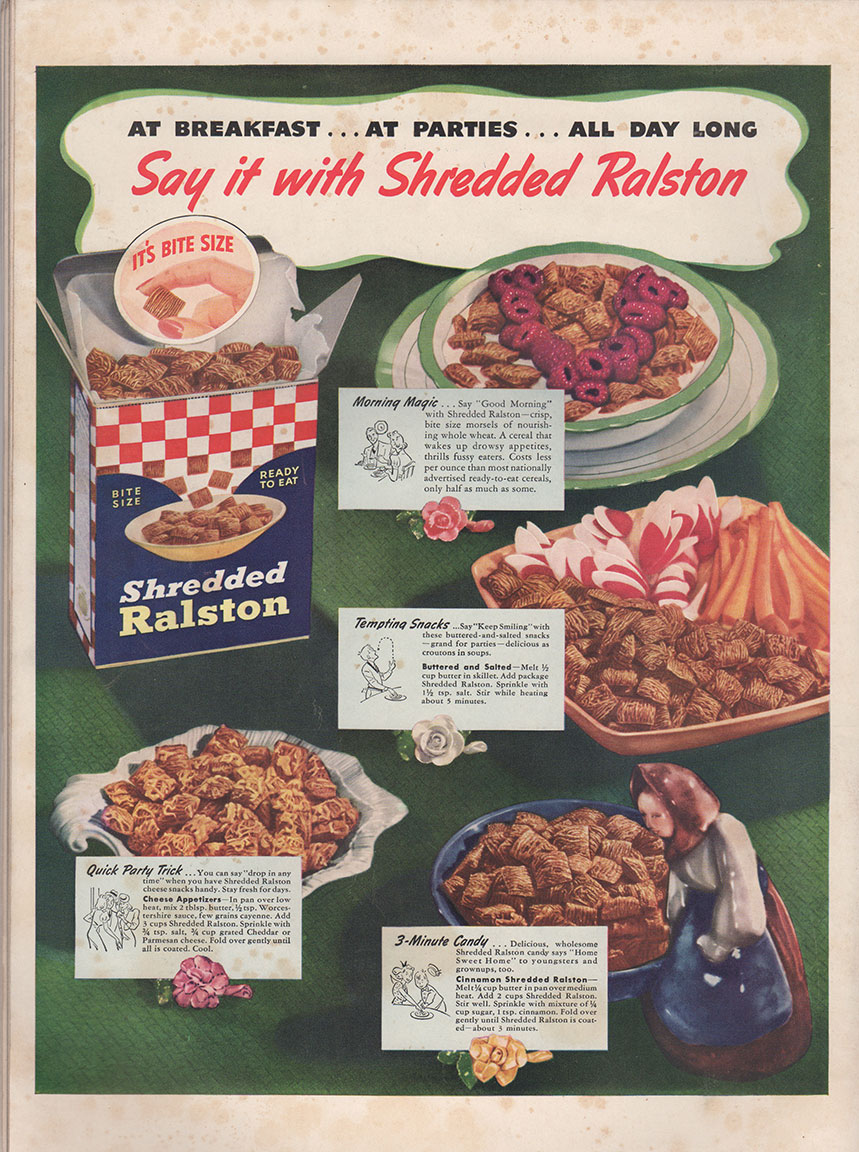
Shredded Ralston advertisement, 1942

Chex cereal traces its lineage back to Shredded Ralston, which was first produced in 1936. One 1936 grocery store advertisement for the cereal described it as, "ready to eat, made from pure whole wheat . . . Cooked, shredded, and toasted to a delicious golden brown; new in flavor." Bite-sized Shredded Ralston was described in one early promotional article as whole wheat that had been "shredded and baked into crisp-bite-size biscuits." In addition to being recommended as a breakfast cereal, it was suggested as soup croutons, a snack with melted butter, and as the heart of a homemade candy flavored with honey and lemon.

One of the early distinctive characteristics of Chex was its shape. When Rice Chex was introduced in 1950, one advertisement described it as, "Golden-toasted shreds of rice, crisscrossed into hollow, Bit Size waffles. Shaped just right for easy eating." In 1951, Shredded Ralston was rebranded as Wheat Chex, initially stating "We are changing the name of Shredded Ralston to Shredded Ralston Wheat Chex," but often using both the short name and the longer name within the same ad copy. Side by side photos in the early 1950s show that the shape of Wheat Chex was not yet changed to the waffle-shape of Rice Chex, retaining its denser, biscuit-like form. When Corn Chex was released in 1959, it was given the Rice Check "criss-crossed" shape, described as helping it stay crispy in milk.

When Ralcorp sold the Chex Brand to General Mills, the Federal Trade Commission required General Mills to permit the production of private label (store brand) versions of Chex, including by Ralcorp itself.

== Flavors and varieties ==
- Rice Chex (introduced in 1950)
- Wheat Chex (introduced in 1951, 1936 as "Shredded Ralston")
- Corn Chex (introduced throughout the United States in 1959 after limited distribution in 1958)
- Honey Nut Chex (introduced in 1998 as the first General Mills addition to the Chex brand)
- Chocolate Chex
- Cinnamon Chex
- Blueberry Chex
- Peanut Butter Chex
- Strawberry Vanilla (introduced in 2024)
- Caramel Corn Chex

=== Discontinued varieties ===
- Raisin Bran Chex (introduced into wide distribution in 1968)
- Sugar Frosted Chex (released throughout the United States in 1969)
- Sugar Chex
- Super Sugar Chex
- Oat Chex
- Bran Chex (introduced in 1977)
- Rye Chex
- Double Chex
- Wheat & Raisin Chex
- Graham Chex
- Honey Graham Chex
- Frosted Mini-Chex
- Strawberry Chex
- Multi-Bran Chex
- Green Onion Chex (limited edition, released by Kellogg's in South Korea in 2020)
- Vanilla Chex
- Apple Cinnamon Chex

== Marketing ==
In its early days, Shredded Ralston (what became Wheat Chex) was promoted as a cereal for the whole family. One common 1937 advertisement said, "Its flavor knows no limits," and then proceeded to explain with six-year old Bobby and older family members all had a different reason to enjoy the cereal. By 1939, Ralston Purina had begun hoping to entice customers with box-top giveaways, such as a pen and pencil set that was still aimed at the whole family. By 1941, however, while their advertising still hoped to entice mothers and wives, the promotions had begun to be aimed at children, such as Tom Mix comic book give-aways. By 1951, Rice Chex and Wheat Chex were tied up with prized and box-top giveaways squarely aimed at children, such as ripcord helicopter toys.

Ralston Purina attempted to redefine the Chex brand in 1956 by running copy on cereal boxes and in some newspapers which declared that they would no longer be putting prizes inside the boxes or targeting children: "This box contains 12 ounces of crunchable, munchable Wheat Chex - the only cereal made on purpose for Grownups."

Even so, later ad campaigns for Chex varieties were not so restrained: "Now in every box of Sugar Frosted Chex, you can get one of nine different prizes. Kids will love the secret agent ring or invisible spy pen..."

=== Tie-in promotions ===
The 1970s varieties Sugar Chex and Super Sugar Chex featured Casper the Friendly Ghost on the box.

=== Television and radio ===
==== Tom Mix ====
During the 1930s, Ralston Purina sponsored the Tom Mix radio show, produced Tom Mix comic books and give-aways, and promoted Shredded Ralston (what became Wheat Chex) as, "the Tom Mix Bite Size cereal that's rich in 'Cowboy Energy.'"

==== Space Patrol ====
From 1950 to 1955, Chex served as the primary sponsor of the popular TV and radio show Space Patrol, which ran for over 1,000 television episodes and 129 radio episodes. These episodes included many advertisements, promotional offers, and prizes related to Chex cereal, specifically Wheat Chex and Rice Chex.

==== The Chexmates ====
In 1968, Chex ran a series of TV commercials on the adventures of The Chexmates, a cartoon threesome who ate Chex to get the strength they needed to travel to Mars, overcome tough obstacles or subdue evil-doers. The characters were a muscular man named Chexter, an Asian karate expert named Chop Louie, and a blonde cowgirl named Jessie Jane. Their voices were provided by John Erwin, Tommy Cook and Julie Bennett.

=== Video games ===
Chex is featured in a series of first-person shooter computer games, Chex Quest and its two sequels. The player takes on the role of a "Chex Warrior" clad in Chex armor. The games use a modified version of DOOM's IWAD (graphics, sounds, levels, etc.) and executable.

== Chex Mix ==
Chex is also the basis for a baked snack called "Chex Mix", in which different kinds of Chex are mixed with nuts, pretzels, and baked crackers, and then often baked again with butter and various other spices (Worcestershire sauce in the original mix) to add flavor. Commercial and homemade varieties exist and the snack is often served during the holiday season in the United States. Chex Mix recipes were regularly featured on Chex cereal boxes, and several varieties of commercially prepared Chex Mix are sold in supermarkets.

=== Puppy chow ===
Chex can also be used to make a chocolate snack called "Chex Muddy Buddies", also known as Puppy Chow.

== See also ==
- List of breakfast cereals
- Life (cereal)
- Crispix – previously called "Chex" in New Zealand
- Shreddies
- Shredded wheat - a cereal similar to the early Shredded Ralston version of Chex
