= TeamTNT =

Distributed group of Doom mappers

- Industry: Video games
- Founded: 1994
- Founders: Ty Halderman
- Defunct: 2015
- Key people: Paul Fleschute
- Number of employees: 104 (1995)

TeamTNT was a distributed group of Doom mappers, originally formed as a Doom mailing list in 1994. The team are known for creating the TNT: Evilution episode of Final Doom, as well as several free level packs and developer resources for Doom II. Their source ports, the BOOM and Boom-DM engines were used by many level designers during the height of Doom modding in the 1990s. The group was largely inactive from 2008, with their resources remaining online until the 2015 death of administrator Ty Halderman.

== History ==
=== Origins & Final Doom ===
TeamTNT developed in late 1994 and early 1995 from the highly active doom-editing mailing list. TeamTNT originally formed as a two-group entity: the Alpha group whose concerns centered primarily on level design and mod work employing pre-existing Doom II resources as developed by the original Id Software team, and the Beta group who would be focused more closely on partial and total conversions including sprite changes. The Beta team dissolved shortly after the official formation of The TeamTNT Trust, the legal entity which dealt with Id Software during negotiations concerning Final Doom. As of February 1995 team membership numbered at 104 members (including all former members of the doom-editing mailing list).

=== Decline ===
During the late 1990s membership declined and fluctuated such that as of 1999, membership ranged from 35–40 members with as many as an additional 40 former and inactive members still listed on official member lists. Paul Fleschute broke his "Ultimate Invasion" project away from TeamTNT, though this project never emerged. A number of TeamTNT members were also involved with the LUC project (a game then being developed by Suspension Software based on the Quake II engine). The LUC website went down at some point in the late 2000s without release. Most of TNT's ongoing projects were cancelled in 2007, and the last level pack released by the group was Eternal Doom IV in 2008. TNT website administrator Ty Halderman continued to maintain the /idgames archives until his death from brain cancer on July 31, 2015.

== Releases ==
All of these were released for free, save for Final Doom- though it would ultimately be packaged as a free update to console owners of Doom II in 2019. Several of these were in co-operation with other developers or groups.

- Mar. 1996: Icarus: Alien Vanguard (32-level solo-play level pack initially entitled TNT2)
- Jun. 1996: Final Doom (64-level pack, and the only one to be released commercially)
- Aug. 1996: Bloodlands (32-level multiplayer Doom DM)
- Dec. 1996: Grievance (32-level multiplayer Doom DM)
- Oct. 1997: Pursuit (32-level multiplayer Doom DM)
- Nov. 1997: Eternal Doom [1–3] (34-level solo-play level pack created by TeamTNT and Team Eternal [from the CompuServe forums], which later joined TeamTNT)
- Jun. 1998: Eternal Deathmatch (multiplayer Doom DM run through the Eternal Shell)
- Feb. 1999: Reclamation (32-level multiplayer Doom DM)
- Oct. 1999 to Sep. 2000: The Return (TeamTNT public contribution project; collection of single maps for solo- or multiplay, 7 of which were created by TeamTNT)
- Dec. 2003: Daedalus: Alien Defense (32-level solo-play level pack previously released in early 7-map form as Doom2000 at 12:01 am January 1, 2000)
- Jan. 2008: Eternal Doom IV: Return From Oblivion (7-level solo-play, developed by Team Eternal and TeamTNT intended as a sequel to Eternal Doom 3).

== Cancelled projects ==
Some of these were in development in the late 1990s. In 2007 a message was added to the top of TNT's future projects page indicating that these were cancelled.

- Doom Revisited (32-level solo-play level pack attempting to recreate the feel of the original Doom/Doom2 series)
- Eternally New (32-level multiplayer Doom DM run through the Eternal Shell focusing on cooperative play)
- PuzzleWorld (solo-play level pack focusing on puzzles)
- Ragnarok: The Search For Aasgard (and Ragnarok DM) (a total conversion which was awaiting development of the Open Gaming Resource Engine [OGRE])
- Open Gaming Resource Engine [OGRE] (a source merger project between BOOM, WinDoom, and DOSDoom among others. Note: this is not related to the non-TeamTNT OGRE Engine.)
- An additional 25 maps for Eternal Doom IV to convert it into a megawad.
