= Final Doom =

1996 video game

- Developer: TeamTNT (Note: Converted to the PlayStation by Leland Interactive Media. Nerve Software contributed to the 2019 add-on while Nightdive Studios contributed to the 2024 release.)
- Publishers: id Software; Williams Entertainment (PSX); Bethesda Softworks (PS3/2024 release)
- Directors: Ty Halderman (TNT: Evilution); Dario Casali (The Plutonia Experiment)
- Designer: John Romero
- Programmers: John Carmack; John Romero
- Artists: Adrian Carmack; Kevin Cloud
- Composers: Jonathan El-Bizri; Josh Martel; L.A. Sieben; Tom Mustaine; Aubrey Hodges (Note: Aubrey Hodges composed the PlayStation port of the game.)
- Series: Doom
- Engine: Doom engine; Unity (2019 add-on); KEX Engine (2024 release)
- Platforms: MS-DOS, Windows, PlayStation, Mac OS, PlayStation 3
- Release: June 27, 1996: MS-DOS, Windows; NA: June 27, 1996; EU: October 4, 1996; PlayStation; NA: September 25, 1996; EU: October 15, 1996; Mac OS; NA: December 4, 1996; PlayStation 3; WW: November 20, 2012
- Genre: First-person shooter
- Modes: Single-player, multiplayer

Final Doom is a 1996 first-person shooter game developed by TeamTNT and published by id Software for MS-DOS and Macintosh computers, as well as for the PlayStation, although the latter featured a selection of levels from the game and from Master Levels for Doom II.

The third entry in id Software's Doom franchise and the first to not be developed by id, Final Doom consists of two 32-level episodes (or megawads), TNT: Evilution and The Plutonia Experiment. Both megawads were created by members of the hobbyist group TeamTNT, with id Software purchasing the rights to TNT: Evilution just before its planned free release and The Plutonia Experiment being made specifically at the request of id Software by Dario and Milo Casali.

Both episodes take place after the events of Doom II. TNT: Evilution features a mostly new soundtrack interspersed with some tracks from Doom II, while the soundtrack for The Plutonia Experiment entirely consists of tracks from Doom and Doom II.

During August 2022, Final Doom was delisted from the Steam store, in an effort from id Software to consolidate their games' multiple releases and editions. Therefore, Final Doom was bundled into Doom II as a single listing, along with Master Levels for Doom II and No Rest for the Living expansion pack.

== Gameplay ==
The gameplay mechanics of Final Doom are nearly identical to Doom II: Hell on Earth, featuring the same weapons, items, and monsters. However, it is widely considered to be significantly more difficult than its predecessors Doom and Doom II, with The Plutonia Experiment generally being considered more difficult than TNT: Evilution.

=== PlayStation version ===
The gameplay in the PlayStation version of Final Doom is nearly identical to that found in the PlayStation version of Doom, and, in addition, it was compatible with the PlayStation Mouse. Compared to the MS-DOS original, the PlayStation version's overall difficulty was significantly reduced. Many of the harder levels were removed and those that remained often had enemies taken out. For instance, the Cyberdemon was removed from the level 'Baron's Lair'. As in the original PlayStation version of Doom, many of the larger levels from the original MS-DOS versions of Final Doom and Master Levels for Doom II were removed, and both the Arch-vile and Spider Mastermind monsters were removed, due to technical constraints. This limited the PlayStation version to 30 levels in total. The more traditional rock tracks featured in Final Doom were replaced by a darker ambient soundtrack by Aubrey Hodges, who later composed the music for Doom 64 in 1997.

There are also several graphical alterations in the PlayStation version. The simplistic title screens featured in the computer versions have been replaced by a more elaborate title screen that features the animated flame-filled sky texture from the original PlayStation version of Doom. Many of the levels' sky textures have been replaced; some levels' skies are replaced by sky textures seen in previous Doom games, whereas others now feature a new starry sky texture. Finally, most of the level layouts are simplified, similar to previous Doom console ports, and the frame rate of the game is often lower than it was in the first PlayStation Doom game.

== Plot ==
=== TNT: Evilution ===
In TNT: Evilution, the UAC are once again intent on developing and experimenting with dimensional gateway technology. They set up a base on one of the moons of Jupiter, with a detachment of space marines for protection. The marines do their job well; when the first experimental gateway is opened, they annihilate the forces of Hell. Research continues with more confidence and all security measures turned at the gateway.

A few months later, the annual supply arrives ahead of schedule and appears unusually large on radar. The radar operators initially dismiss the anomaly. When base personnel investigate, they discover that the approaching vessel is a demonic spacecraft constructed from steel, stone and organic material. Its gates open and release large numbers of demons, which quickly overrun the facility, killing or transforming its personnel.

The main character, the nameless space marine (who was revealed to be the marine commander on the moon) has been away on a walk at that time and thus escapes death or zombification. After being attacked by an imp, he rushes back to the base where he sees the demonic spaceship still hovering above it and realizes what has happened. He then swears that he will avenge his slain troops and sets out to kill as many demons as possible.

In the end, the marine defeats the Icon of Sin and the game describes "something rumbles in the distance. A blue light glows within the ruined skull of the demon-spitter."

=== The Plutonia Experiment ===
In The Plutonia Experiment, after Hell's catastrophic invasion of Earth, the global governments decide to take measures against any possible future invasion, knowing that the powers of Hell still remained strong. The UAC is reformed under completely new management (the old trustees and stockholders were all dead anyway) and aims at developing tools that would prevent demonic invasions.

The scientists start working on a device known as the Quantum Accelerator intended to close invasion Gates and stop future invasions. The experiments are carried out in a secret research complex, with a stationed detachment of marines. The work seems to be going well but the creatures from Outside have their attention drawn towards the new research. A Gate opens in the heart of the complex and unnatural horrors pour out. The Quantum Accelerator performs superbly: the Gate is quickly closed and the invasion is stopped. Research continues more boldly.

On the next day, a ring of 7 Gates opens and an even greater invasion begins. For one hour the Quantum Accelerators manage to close 6 of the Gates, but the Hellish army has become too numerous and too strong. The complex is overrun and everyone is slain, or zombified. The last Gate of Hell remains open, guarded by a Gatekeeper: a powerful, enormous and ancient demon that has the power to open Dimensional Gates and control or protect them.

The government, frantic that the Quantum Accelerator will be destroyed or used against humanity, orders all marines to the site at once. The player, the nameless space marine, was on leave at the beach. He was also closest to the site and gets there first. There he discovers that there is much demonic activity (howling, chanting, machine sounds) within the complex; the Gatekeeper is obviously working on something, and his work would soon reach some awful climax. He also realizes that when the marines arrive, they would not be able to penetrate the heavily infested complex, despite the firepower and support they will have. The marine decides to enter the complex and stop the Gatekeeper alone.

== Development ==
The original TNT: Evilution megawad was created by TeamTNT, a group of WAD-making hobbyists who were active on the 'advanced Doom editing' mailing list. It was scheduled to be released online as a free download on October 25, 1995. However, just 5 hours before its release John Romero contacted the leader of TeamTNT, Ty Halderman, with an offer to acquire and sell the project as an official product." The 2–3 dozen core members of TeamTNT formed a legal entity and completed the sale to id Software a couple weeks later. GT Interactive secured worldwide rights to distribute the game in February 1996.

Brothers Dario and Milo Casali, who had contributed eight levels to TNT: Evilution, were assigned the task of creating what became The Plutonia Experiment after having sent an eight-level WAD they had created to American McGee and managing to impress him along with the rest of the id Software crew. They created 16 levels each for The Plutonia Experiment in four months time, and submitted them in January 1996. Unlike their contributions to TNT: Evilution, which were edited by id Software before the final release, (Note: Additionally, four of their eight levels were excluded from the final release because they were too big to run on 8MB of RAM, Final Doom's minimum system requirement.) no revisions were made to or requested for these 32 levels.

When asked post-release about reports that many players found the Plutonia levels too hard for them, Dario Casali stated that "Plutonia was always meant for people who had finished Doom 2 on hard and were looking for a new challenge. I always played through the level I had made on hard, and if I could beat it too easily, I made it harder, so it was a challenge for me."

Final Doom uses a slightly modified version of the game engine from The Ultimate Doom, an expansion to the original Doom game released in 1995. A significant bug in Final Doom's engine has to do with how teleporters function: the Y-position of the teleporting thing is not checked, resulting in players and monsters appearing above or below the intended destination. This may result in levels played with Final Doom not functioning properly. It also effects the cross-engine compatibility of demos, or replays based on a recording of the player's inputs.

== Reception ==
Reception

Aggregate score
Aggregator	Score
GameRankings	81% (PS)

Review scores
Publication	Score
Electronic Gaming Monthly	6.125/10 (PS)
GameSpot	4.6/10 (PC)
Next Generation	3/5 (PS)

Reviewing the PC version in GameSpot, Jim Varner argued that Final Doom is a waste of money, since it is essentially just a new set of level maps for Doom, and there were already thousands of such maps available to download for free on the internet.

While GamePro criticized that Final Doom has no new enemies or weapons, and that the PlayStation version includes only 30 levels as compared to the PC version's 64, they were pleased with the "huge, perplexing, and sometimes sadistic levels" and the new scenery, and considered Doom still a compelling enough game that simply more of the same was enough to satisfy. PlayStation Magazine gave it a score of 9/10, calling it "essential". A reviewer for Next Generation was less impressed, remarking that a side-by-side comparison with the PlayStation version of the original Doom reveals that Final Doom has a much lower frame rate, less precise control, and more visible seams in the textures. Three of the four reviewers of Electronic Gaming Monthly said they were tired of seeing ports of Doom, and that Final Doom was simply another such port with new level maps. They also said that the game engine had become severely outdated in the years since Doom was first released. Crispin Boyer was the one dissenting voice, expressing enthusiasm for the new level designs.
