= Strife (1996 video game) =

- Developers: Rogue Entertainment; Night Dive Studios (Veteran Edition)
- Publishers: NA: Velocity Inc.; EU: Studio 3DO; WW: Night Dive Studios (Veteran Edition)
- Producer: Susan G. McBride
- Designer: Jim Molinets
- Programmers: James Monroe; Peter Mack
- Artists: Rich Fleider; Steven Maines
- Writers: Michael Kaplan; John Sanborn
- Composer: Morey Goldstein
- Engine: Doom engine
- Platforms: MS-DOS; Windows; OS X; Linux; Switch
- Release: MS-DOS: NA: May 3, 1996; EU: May 31, 1996; Veteran Edition; Windows, OS X, Linux: WW: December 12, 2014; Switch: WW: October 25, 2020; Luna: US: September 29, 2022
- Genres: First-person shooter, role-playing
- Modes: Single-player, multiplayer

Strife (also known as Strife: Quest for the Sigil) is a first-person shooter role-playing video game developed by Rogue Entertainment. It was released in May 1996 in North America by Velocity Inc. and in Europe by Studio 3DO. The shareware version was released on February 23, 1996, while the full version was released on May 3. It was the last commercially released standalone PC game to utilize the Doom engine from id Software. The plot takes place in a world taken over by a religious organization known as "The Order"; the protagonist, an unnamed mercenary (sometimes referred to as Strifeguy), becomes a member of the resistance movement which aims to topple the Order's oppressive rule.

Strife added some role-playing game elements to the classic first-person shooter formula, such as allowing players to talk to other characters in the game's world or improve the protagonist's abilities. Contemporary reviews praised these innovations and the story, but also criticized the quality of the graphics and the obsolete engine. Years after its release, the game was retrospectively considered to have been underappreciated in its day, and described as a precursor to games such as Deus Ex.

An enhanced version of the game, Strife: Veteran Edition (also dubbed The Original Strife: Veteran Edition) was developed and published by Night Dive Studios and released on Steam on December 12, 2014. Veteran Edition was also released on Nintendo Switch and Amazon Luna on October 25, 2020 and September 29, 2022, respectively. Atari was later in charge of the publishing duties of the Nintendo Switch version, as its parent company bought Nightdive Studios in March 2023.

== Gameplay ==
A conversation with a non-player character in the town of Tarnhill

Strife's gameplay is standard for the first-person shooter genre; the action is observed from the protagonist's viewpoint, and most of the game involves combat with the Order's infantry and war robots. The main character begins with just a dagger, but more powerful weapons, such as a crossbow or a flamethrower can be found throughout the game. The protagonist also has an inventory where he can keep items for later use, such as first aid kits for healing, protective armor, or gold coins.

The game contains numerous friendly or neutral characters with whom the player can converse or trade. These characters often assign the player character missions, thus advancing the plot. If the player fires a weapon while not in a combat situation, it usually sets off an alarm and makes the guards attack the protagonist; however, certain weapons – the dagger and poisonous crossbow bolts – allow attacking enemies stealthily without activating the alarm.

Unlike most other first-person shooters of the time, Strife does not follow a linear series of levels. Instead, the town of Tarnhill acts as a central hub from which the player can travel back and forth between various areas, which stay the same as they were when the player left them.

The player character has two numerical attributes, accuracy and stamina, which can be improved at certain points in the game. The first attribute increases the accuracy of ranged weapons, while the latter increases the maximum amount of health.

== Plot ==
The game is set some time after a catastrophic comet impact, which brought a deadly virus onto the planet. In the resulting plague, millions of people died, while other victims became mutated and began hearing the voice of a malevolent deity. They formed an organization called "The Order" and enslaved the rest of the populace, but a rag-tag resistance movement, called "The Front", is trying to topple The Order's reign.

The unnamed protagonist of the game is a wandering mercenary, captured by Order troops near the town of Tarnhill. After killing the guards and escaping, he meets a man named Rowan, who makes him an offer to join the Front. The protagonist receives a communication device through which he remains in contact with a female member of the Front, codenamed Blackbird. From then on, Blackbird provides assistance and commentary throughout the game. The protagonist heads to the Front's base, where the rebel leader, Macil, sends him on a number of missions in order to weaken the Order. After several acts of sabotage, the Front proceeds to assault the Order's castle. The protagonist, accompanying them in the attack, kills a major member of the Order called "The Programmer". He loses consciousness upon touching the weapon that the Programmer had been using.

The mercenary wakes up in the castle, now taken over by the Front. Macil explains that the Programmer's weapon is one of the five fragments of the "Sigil", a powerful weapon worshipped by the Order. He orders the protagonist to find the remaining four. To this end, the mercenary visits a knowledgeable being called "The Oracle", who reveals that the next fragment is being held by another of the Order's leaders, The Bishop. After killing the Bishop and acquiring the second fragment, the protagonist returns to the Oracle, only to be told that the third fragment is being held by Macil himself; the Oracle claims that Macil is a traitor who has been using the protagonist as a pawn in his scheme. At this point, the player must make a decision: either disbelieve the Oracle and kill it, or trust the Oracle and kill Macil. This choice affects the rest of the story.

If the player trusts Macil and kills the Oracle (acquiring a Sigil fragment it was holding), he receives another task from Macil: to deactivate a factory, built on the comet's impact site, where the Order is turning captured people into "bio-mechanical soldiers". Upon completing his mission, the protagonist learns that Macil has gone insane; he returns to the base and attempts to speak to Macil, who declares in his madness that he wishes to free the "one god", then attacks the protagonist. Upon killing Macil, the protagonist obtains his Sigil fragment. He then returns to the factory, where lies the laboratory of the Loremaster, another of the Order's leaders. After killing Loremaster and thus acquiring the final Sigil piece, he uses the Sigil to unlock a door leading to the comet's impact site. Inside, he finds an extraterrestrial spaceship. Within the ship waits an alien being known as "The Entity"; it is the one responsible for creating the Order and taking over the minds of mutated people. The mercenary kills it with the Sigil; its death means the end of the Order. He then finally meets Blackbird face to face. She tells him that his victory allowed mankind to create a vaccine for the virus, then kisses him.

The plot takes a different direction if the player decides to trust the Oracle and immediately kill Macil. Once he does so (claiming Macil's Sigil piece in the process), the Oracle dispatches him to the Loremaster's laboratory. Having killed the Loremaster and obtained his fragment of the Sigil, the protagonist returns to the Oracle, who then reveals that it was using him all along in a bid to acquire the complete Sigil, use it to free the "one god", and attain eternal life. The mercenary kills the Oracle and, with all five fragments of the Sigil now in his possession, heads to the alien ship. There he encounters the Entity, but the being speaks with Blackbird's voice, and implies that it was manipulating the protagonist throughout the game in order to regain freedom and take over the planet. After killing the Entity, the ending sequence is shown, this time less optimistic: the cure for the virus has not been invented and mankind's future is uncertain.

== Development ==
Strife was originally being developed by Cygnus Studios, the creators of Raptor: Call of the Shadows, for id Software. Cygnus Studios was already working on another first-person shooter role-playing game, The Second Sword, utilizing the older ShadowCaster game engine by id Software. id Software asked Cygnus Studios to create a game based on the Doom engine and requested that the studio be relocated to Texas from Chicago while they were still developing Raptor so that they would be able to develop the new title for id Software. The studio agreed and after relocating, the studio no longer wanted to work on The Second Sword and the title was dropped in favor of working on Strife.

Cygnus Studios worked on Strife for a few months following Raptor being finished. However, internal conflicts soon arose and employees split off from Scott Host, the original founder of Cygnus Studios, and he re-located back to Chicago and Strife was essentially cancelled. This group of employees then founded Rogue Entertainment and resumed development on Strife. The shareware version was released on February 23, 1996, while the full version was released on May 31. It was the last commercially released standalone PC game to utilize the Doom engine from id Software.

=== Community support ===
After the game's official support ended, game engine recreations of Strife were created by Doom source port developers through reverse engineering. Notably authors were Jānis Legzdiņš (author of the Doom source port Vavoom), Marisa Heit (author of ZDoom), Samuel Villarreal (author of SvStrife), and James Haley (author with Samuel Villareal of Chocolate Strife). Except for the last, these allow for high resolution graphics modes, better mouselook, and expanded modding capabilities.

Strife was ported to the Amiga in 2013.

=== Digital re-release ===
In 2014 Night Dive Studios coordinated the digital re-release of Strife as Strife: Veteran Edition (or The Original Strife: Veteran Edition), after acquiring rights to the game. Because the game's source code had been lost by Rogue Entertainment, a derivative of the Chocolate Doom subproject Chocolate Strife was used as the game's engine, with its original programmers being contracted to do additional coding for the re-release. The source code of Strife: Veteran Edition was made available under GNU GPL-2.0-or-later on github.com. The enhanced version of the game was released as Strife: Veteran Edition by Night Dive Studios on Steam on December 12, 2014. Veteran Edition was subsequently released for Nintendo Switch on October 25, 2020, and for Amazon Luna on September 29, 2022.

== Reception ==
Reception

Aggregate score
Aggregator	Score
GameRankings	72%

Review scores
Publication	Score
Computer Games Strategy Plus	3.5/5
Computer Gaming World	3/5
GameSpot	7/10
Next Generation	3/5
PC Games	B

Strife received very positive reviews upon its release. Reviewers took note of the novel gameplay: unlike most previous first-person shooters, such as Doom, the player must cooperate with friendly characters in Strife, while killing everyone in sight ends badly. Some reviews praised the story, but the reviewer in Next Generation criticized it for being too linear and the choices being illusionary.

The voice-acting in the game was generally rated positively; in particular, the voice and personality of Blackbird was praised by some reviewers, with GameSpot's Tal Blevins describing her voice as "sexy".

Strife's graphics were overall rated poorly. The reviewers criticized the game for using the obsolete Doom engine, which they considered especially jarring when compared to more modern games such as Duke Nukem 3D or Quake. However, the hand-drawn illustrations which appear during dialogues and cutscenes were generally considered to be of good quality. Some reviewers doubted the novelty of the gameplay, pointing out that similar ideas were already used in e.g. CyberMage: Darklight Awakening. Limiting the player to a single savegame slot was also criticized, especially since making a wrong decision could make the game unwinnable.

Years after its release, retrospective reviews of the game were more positive. The reviewer of jeuxvideo.com recommended Strife for first-person shooter fans. Two articles about the game were published on the PC Gamer website. Richard Cobbett described the game in his "Saturday Crapshoot" series; he considered Strife to be an underappreciated game, but believed that it had not aged well. Paul Dean likewise concluded that Strife did not receive the attention it deserved back in its day, and encouraged readers to play the game. Both journalists compared Strife to the later Deus Ex, a more commercially successful attempt to combine the first-person shooter formula with role-playing elements.
