= List of Raven Software games =

Video games by developer

Raven Software is an American video game developer based in Madison, Wisconsin. It was founded in 1990 by brothers Brian and Steve Raffel after getting a publishing deal for their first game, Black Crypt (1992). During that game's development, the company formed a relationship with id Software, which was briefly located on the same street. Raven spent the next few years working primarily on PC games in partnership with id, making ShadowCaster (1993) with a game engine by id Software and three games in the Heretic series between 1994 and 1997 with id as the publisher and id Software employees as the producers. In 1997, Raven made an exclusive publishing deal with Activision, and the Raffel brothers subsequently sold the company to Activision. Several employees left Raven Software at that time to form Human Head Studios.

Raven spent the next decade working on a few original games such as Soldier of Fortune, as well as licensed games, including Star Trek: Voyager – Elite Force (2000), Quake 4 (2005), the Star Wars games Star Wars Jedi Knight II: Jedi Outcast (2002) and Star Wars Jedi Knight: Jedi Academy (2003), and the Marvel Entertainment games X-Men Legends (2004), X-Men Legends II: Rise of Apocalypse (2005), and Marvel: Ultimate Alliance (2006). By 2009, the company had three development teams, and released the licensed games Wolfenstein (2009) and X-Men Origins: Wolverine (2009), while working on their first original game since 2002, Singularity (2010). Wolfenstein and Singularity sold poorly, however, and Raven laid off employees after each game, consolidating into a single development team by October 2010, shortly after Singularity's release. Following the layoffs, Raven focused exclusively as an assistant developer for the Call of Duty series, which has the position of lead developer rotate between Infinity Ward, Treyarch, and Sledgehammer Games. Raven was the primary developer on two games since then: the China-exclusive Call of Duty Online (2015) and Call of Duty: Modern Warfare Remastered (2016), a remaster of the 2007 Call of Duty 4: Modern Warfare packaged with Call of Duty: Infinite Warfare.

== Games ==
List of games
Game	Details
Black Crypt Original release date: February 1992	Release years by system: 1992 – Amiga
Black Crypt Original release date: February 1992	Notes: Role-playing video game; Published by Electronic Arts; Demo for MS-DOS version created, but full game never released; Sega Genesis version announced at Winter CES 1992, but was cancelled
ShadowCaster Original release date: September 1993	Release years by system: 1993 – MS-DOS; 1994 – PC-98
ShadowCaster Original release date: September 1993	Notes: Role-playing video game; Published by Origin Systems; Game engine developed by John Carmack of id Software as an expanded version of his Wolfenstein 3D engine
CyClones Original release date: November 1994	Release years by system: 1994 – MS-DOS
CyClones Original release date: November 1994	Notes: First-person shooter; Published by Strategic Simulations
Heretic Original release date: December 23, 1994	Release years by system: 1994 – MS-DOS; 1999 – MacOS
Heretic Original release date: December 23, 1994	Notes: First-person shooter; Divided into three episodes: "City of the Damned", "Hell's Maw", and "The Dome of D'Sparil"; Published as shareware by id Software: "City of the Damned" was released for free, with the other two episodes available for purchase; Published as a retail title by GT Interactive as Heretic: Shadow of the Serpent Riders in 1996, with two additional episodes: "The Ossuary" and "The Stagnant Demesne"
Hexen: Beyond Heretic Original release date: October 30, 1995	Release years by system: 1995 – MS-DOS; 1997 – MacOS, PlayStation, Sega Saturn, Nintendo 64
Hexen: Beyond Heretic Original release date: October 30, 1995	Notes: First-person shooter; Published by id Software through GT Interactive; An expansion pack, Deathkings of the Dark Citadel, was released in 1996
Necrodome Original release date: September 30, 1996	Release years by system: 1996 – Windows
Necrodome Original release date: September 30, 1996	Notes: Vehicular combat game; Published by Mindscape
Hexen II Original release date: August 31, 1997	Release years by system: 1997 – Windows; 2002 – macOS
Hexen II Original release date: August 31, 1997	Notes: First-person shooter; Published by id Software through Activision; An expansion pack, Hexen II Mission Pack: Portal of Praevus, was published by Activision in 1998; PlayStation and Sega Saturn versions were to be published by Activision but both were cancelled
Take No Prisoners Original release date: September 30, 1997	Release years by system: 1997 – Windows
Take No Prisoners Original release date: September 30, 1997	Notes: Action game; Published by Red Orb Entertainment
MageSlayer Original release date: September 30, 1997	Release years by system: 1997 – Windows
MageSlayer Original release date: September 30, 1997	Notes: Action game; Published by GT Interactive
Heretic II Original release date: October 31, 1998	Release years by system: 1998 – Windows; 1999 – Linux; 2000 – AmigaOS; 2002 – macOS
Heretic II Original release date: October 31, 1998	Notes: Action-adventure game; Published by Activision
Soldier of Fortune Original release date: March 27, 2000	Release years by system: 2000 – Windows; 2001 – Dreamcast, PlayStation 2, Linux
Soldier of Fortune Original release date: March 27, 2000	Notes: First-person shooter; Published by Activision; Two additional versions of the game were released with additional levels and enhancements: the "Gold Edition" (2000) and the "Platinum Edition" (2001)
Star Trek: Voyager – Elite Force Original release date: September 19, 2000	Release years by system: 2000 – Windows, macOS; 2001 – PlayStation 2
Star Trek: Voyager – Elite Force Original release date: September 19, 2000	Notes: First-person shooter; Published by Activision; An expansion pack, Star Trek: Voyager – Elite Force: Virtual Voyager, was published by Activision in 2001
Star Wars Jedi Knight II: Jedi Outcast Original release date: March 28, 2002	Release years by system: 2002 – Windows, macOS; 2003 – GameCube, Xbox; 2019 – Nintendo Switch, PlayStation 4
Star Wars Jedi Knight II: Jedi Outcast Original release date: March 28, 2002	Notes: Action game; Published by LucasArts; Included in the Star Wars: The Best of PC compilation
Soldier of Fortune II: Double Helix Original release date: May 22, 2002	Release years by system: 2002 – Windows, macOS; 2003 – Xbox
Soldier of Fortune II: Double Helix Original release date: May 22, 2002	Notes: Action game; Published by Activision
Star Wars Jedi Knight: Jedi Academy Original release date: September 16, 2003	Release years by system: 2003 – Windows, macOS, Xbox; 2020 – Nintendo Switch, PlayStation 4
Star Wars Jedi Knight: Jedi Academy Original release date: September 16, 2003	Notes: Action game; Published by Activision
X-Men Legends Original release date: September 21, 2004	Release years by system: 2004 – GameCube, PlayStation 2, Xbox; 2005 – N-Gage
X-Men Legends Original release date: September 21, 2004	Notes: Action role-playing game; Published by Activision
X-Men Legends II: Rise of Apocalypse Original release date: September 20, 2005	Release years by system: 2005 – GameCube, mobile phones, N-Gage, Windows, PlayStation 2, PlayStation Portable, Xbox
X-Men Legends II: Rise of Apocalypse Original release date: September 20, 2005	Notes: Action role-playing game; Published by Activision
Quake 4 Original release date: October 18, 2005	Release years by system: 2005 – Windows, macOS, Linux, Xbox 360
Quake 4 Original release date: October 18, 2005	Notes: First-person shooter; Developed with assistance by id Software; Published by Activision
Marvel: Ultimate Alliance Original release date: October 24, 2006	Release years by system: 2006 – Game Boy Advance, Windows, PlayStation 2, PlayStation 3, PlayStation Portable, Wii, Xbox, Xbox 360; 2016 – PlayStation 4, Xbox One
Marvel: Ultimate Alliance Original release date: October 24, 2006	Notes: Action role-playing game; Published by Activision; The Game Boy Advance version was developed by Barking Lizards Technologies, and is substantially different from other versions of the game
X-Men Origins: Wolverine Original release date: May 1, 2009	Release years by system: 2009 – Mobile phones, Nintendo DS, Windows, PlayStation 2, PlayStation 3, PlayStation Portable, Wii, Xbox 360
X-Men Origins: Wolverine Original release date: May 1, 2009	Notes: Action-adventure game; Published by Activision
Wolfenstein Original release date: August 18, 2009	Release years by system: 2009 – Windows, PlayStation 3, Xbox 360
Wolfenstein Original release date: August 18, 2009	Notes: First-person shooter; Published by Activision
Singularity Original release date: June 25, 2010	Release years by system: 2010 – Windows, PlayStation 3, Xbox 360
Singularity Original release date: June 25, 2010	Notes: First-person shooter; Published by Activision
Call of Duty: Black Ops Original release date: November 9, 2010	Release years by system: 2010 – Nintendo DS, Windows, PlayStation 3, Wii, Xbox 360; 2012 – macOS
Call of Duty: Black Ops Original release date: November 9, 2010	Notes: First-person shooter; Developed primarily by Treyarch, with Raven assisting and developing DLC for the game; Published by Activision
Call of Duty: Modern Warfare 3 Original release date: November 8, 2011	Release years by system: 2011 – Windows, PlayStation 3, Wii, Xbox 360
Call of Duty: Modern Warfare 3 Original release date: November 8, 2011	Notes: First-person shooter; Developed primarily by Infinity Ward, with Raven assisting and developing DLC for the game; Published by Activision
Call of Duty: Black Ops II Original release date: November 13, 2012	Release years by system: 2012 – Windows, PlayStation 3, Wii U, Xbox 360
Call of Duty: Black Ops II Original release date: November 13, 2012	Notes: First-person shooter; Developed primarily by Treyarch, with Raven assisting; Published by Activision
Call of Duty: Ghosts Original release date: November 5, 2013	Release years by system: 2013 – Windows, PlayStation 3, PlayStation 4, Wii U, Xbox 360, Xbox One
Call of Duty: Ghosts Original release date: November 5, 2013	Notes: First-person shooter; Developed primarily by Infinity Ward, with Raven leading development on multiplayer; Published by Activision
Call of Duty: Advanced Warfare Original release date: November 4, 2014	Release years by system: 2014 – Windows, PlayStation 3, PlayStation 4, Xbox 360, Xbox One
Call of Duty: Advanced Warfare Original release date: November 4, 2014	Notes: First-person shooter; Developed primarily by Sledgehammer Games, with Raven leading development on multiplayer and Zombies; Published by Activision
Call of Duty Online Original release date: January 12, 2015	Release years by system: 2015 – Windows
Call of Duty Online Original release date: January 12, 2015	Notes: Free-to-play massively multiplayer online first-person shooter; Published by Activision and Tencent
Call of Duty: Black Ops III Original release date: November 6, 2015	Release years by system: 2015 – Windows, PlayStation 3, PlayStation 4, Xbox 360, Xbox One
Call of Duty: Black Ops III Original release date: November 6, 2015	Notes: First-person shooter; Developed primarily by Treyarch, with Raven assisting; Published by Activision
Call of Duty: Infinite Warfare Original release date: November 4, 2016	Release years by system: 2016 – Windows, PlayStation 4, Xbox One
Call of Duty: Infinite Warfare Original release date: November 4, 2016	Notes: First-person shooter; Developed primarily by Infinity Ward, with Raven assisting; Published by Activision
Call of Duty: Modern Warfare Remastered Original release date: November 4, 2016	Release years by system: 2016 – Windows, PlayStation 4, Xbox One
Call of Duty: Modern Warfare Remastered Original release date: November 4, 2016	Notes: First-person shooter; Remastered version of Call of Duty 4: Modern Warfare (2007), originally developed by Infinity Ward; Published by Activision
Call of Duty: WWII Original release date: November 3, 2017	Release years by system: 2017 – Windows, PlayStation 4, Xbox One
Call of Duty: WWII Original release date: November 3, 2017	Notes: First-person shooter; Developed primarily by Sledgehammer Games, with Raven assisting; Published by Activision
Call of Duty: Black Ops 4 Original release date: October 12, 2018	Release years by system: 2018 – Windows, PlayStation 4, Xbox One
Call of Duty: Black Ops 4 Original release date: October 12, 2018	Notes: First-person shooter; Developed primarily by Treyarch, with Raven assisting; Published by Activision
Call of Duty: Modern Warfare Original release date: October 25, 2019	Release years by system: 2019 – Windows, PlayStation 4, Xbox One
Call of Duty: Modern Warfare Original release date: October 25, 2019	Notes: First-person shooter; Developed primarily by Infinity Ward, with Raven assisting; Published by Activision
Call of Duty: Warzone Original release date: March 10, 2020	Release years by system: 2020 – Windows, PlayStation 4, Xbox One
Call of Duty: Warzone Original release date: March 10, 2020	Notes: First-person shooter; Co-developed with Infinity Ward; Published by Activision
Call of Duty: Black Ops Cold War Original release date: November 13, 2020	Release years by system: 2020 – Windows, PlayStation 4, PlayStation 5, Xbox One, Xbox Series X/S
Call of Duty: Black Ops Cold War Original release date: November 13, 2020	Notes: First-person shooter; Co-developed with Treyarch; Lead development on campaign mode; Published by Activision
Call of Duty: Vanguard Original release date: November 5, 2021	Release years by system: 2021 – Windows, PlayStation 4, PlayStation 5, Xbox One, Xbox Series X/S
Call of Duty: Vanguard Original release date: November 5, 2021	Notes: First-person shooter; Developed primarily by Sledgehammer Games, with Raven assisting; Published by Activision
Call of Duty: Modern Warfare II Original release date: October 28, 2022	Release years by system: 2022 – Windows, PlayStation 4, PlayStation 5, Xbox One, Xbox Series X/S
Call of Duty: Modern Warfare II Original release date: October 28, 2022	Notes: First-person shooter; Developed primarily by Infinity Ward, with Raven assisting; Published by Activision
Call of Duty: Warzone 2.0 Original release date: November 16, 2022	Release years by system: 2022 – Windows, PlayStation 4, PlayStation 5, Xbox One, Xbox Series X/S
Call of Duty: Warzone 2.0 Original release date: November 16, 2022	Notes: First-person shooter; Co-developed with Infinity Ward; Published by Activision
Call of Duty: Modern Warfare III Original release date: November 10, 2023	Release years by system: 2023 – Windows, PlayStation 4, PlayStation 5, Xbox One, Xbox Series X/S
Call of Duty: Modern Warfare III Original release date: November 10, 2023	Notes: First-person shooter; Developed primarily by Sledgehammer Games, with Raven assisting; Published by Activision
Call of Duty: Black Ops 6 Original release date: October 25, 2024	Release years by system: 2024 – Windows, PlayStation 4, PlayStation 5, Xbox One, Xbox Series X/S
Call of Duty: Black Ops 6 Original release date: October 25, 2024	Notes: First-person shooter; Co-developed with Treyarch; Lead development on campaign mode; Published by Activision
Call of Duty: Black Ops 7 Original release date: November 14, 2025	Release years by system: 2025 – Windows, PlayStation 4, PlayStation 5, Xbox One, Xbox Series X/S
Call of Duty: Black Ops 7 Original release date: November 14, 2025	Notes: First-person shooter; Co-developed with Treyarch; Published by Activision

== Sources ==
- Kushner, David (May 11, 2004). Masters of Doom: How Two Guys Created an Empire and Transformed Pop Culture. Random House. ISBN 978-0-8129-7215-3.
