= Chris Rhinehart =

American programmer and video game developer

Chris Rhinehart is a programmer, game developer and co-founder of Human Head Studios. He is currently creative director at Roundhouse Studios.

He started in 1994 in the game industry at the company Raven Software. He contributed to the programming of games such as Heretic, CyClones, Hexen: Beyond Heretic, Heretic: Shadow of the Serpent Riders, Necrodome, Take No Prisoners and Mageslayer alongside fellow developer Ben Gokey.

In 1997, he left the company Raven and co-founded Human Head Studios alongside Paul MacArthur, Shane Gurno, Ben Gokey, James Sumwalt, and Ted Halsted.

He worked on the titles Super Duelling Minivans, Rune and the add-on Halls of Valhalla, Blair Witch, Volume II: The Legend of Coffin Rock (installer) and most recently Prey.

Chris's father Gene Rhinehart died in early 1999 before Rune was completed, and Chris managed to focus on getting the game done - in memory of his Dad. The final credits of the game are dedicated to him.

== Games credited ==
- Heretic (1994)
- CyClones (1994)
- Hexen: Beyond Heretic (1995)
- Necrodome (1996)
- Heretic: Shadow of the Serpent Riders (1996)
- Take No Prisoners (1997)
- Super Duelling Minivans (1997)
- Mageslayer (1997)
- Rune (2000)
- Rune: Halls of Valhalla (2001)
- Rune Gold (2001)
- Duke Nukem: Manhattan Project (2002)
- Prey (2006)
- Prey 2 (unreleased)
