= Ziggurat (2014 video game) =

- Developer: Milkstone Studios
- Publisher: Milkstone Studios
- Engine: Unity
- Platforms: Linux, Windows, Mac, PlayStation 4, Xbox One, Wii U, Nintendo Switch
- Release: Linux, Windows, Mac: WW: 23 October 2014; Xbox One: WW: 20 March 2015; PS4: NA: 21 April 2015; WW: 22 April 2015; Wii U: WW: 18 August 2016; Switch: WW: 5 July 2019
- Genres: First-person shooter; dungeon crawler
- Mode: Single-player

Ziggurat is a first-person shooter dungeon crawl video game developed and published by Milkstone Studios. It was released for Linux, Microsoft Windows and Mac in October 2014 after being available for two months in early access, followed by a release for Xbox One in March 2015 and PlayStation 4 in April 2015. Ziggurat was inspired by the 1990s games Heretic and Hexen: Beyond Heretic. A sequel, Ziggurat 2, was released in 2021.

== Gameplay ==
Ziggurat is a first-person shooter and dungeon crawl video game with roguelike elements. Levels and encounters are procedurally generated and include bosses, trap rooms, spells, and treasures. During gameplay, randomly selected weapons and perks can be unlocked through travelling the dungeon and levelling up.

== Development and release ==
Ziggurat was created by independent developer Milkstone Studios. It was released in early access on Steam for Linux, Microsoft Windows, and OS X. It left early access with a full release on 23 October 2014. The game was released for the Xbox One through the ID@Xbox program on 20 March 2015. A PlayStation 4 version was released in North America on 21 April 2015 and Europe on 22 April 2015.

== Reception ==
Reception

Aggregate score
Aggregator	Score
Metacritic	76/100 (PC); 79/100 (PS4); 76/100 (XBO)

Ziggurat received generally positive reviews from critics upon release. Aggregate review website Metacritic assigned scores of 76/100 for the Windows and Xbox One versions, and 79/100 for the PlayStation 4 version. Some critics likened the game to Raven Software's shooters Heretic and Hexen: Beyond Heretic.

== Sequel ==
Ziggurat 2 was released on 22 October 2020 as a Steam early access game and has received a number of updates since, and was released fully on 28 October 2021. It was released for PlayStation 4, PlayStation 5, Nintendo Switch, and Xbox One and Xbox Series X/S in February 2022.
