= DWANGO =

Online gaming service based in the United States (1994-1998)

- Developer: Interactive Visual Systems
- Type: Online service
- Launched: December 1994
- Discontinued: October 1998
- Platforms: DOS, Microsoft Windows
- Website: "Official website". Archived from the original on February 7, 1998.

The Dial-up Wide-Area Network Game Operation, better known by the acronym DWANGO, was an early online gaming service based in the United States. Launched in 1994, it was originally known for its compatibility with Doom, for which it functioned as a matchmaking service for online multiplayer. The service also supported various other titles, including other id Software games such as Doom II and Heretic as well as titles from other companies like Duke Nukem 3D, Blood, and Shadow Warrior from 3D Realms.

To use the service, players would pay a fee and run the DWANGO client software, which would dial into a DWANGO server. Initially, a phone number in Houston, Texas had to be dialed, but soon a number of servers in other cities were also set up. However, DWANGO's dial-in approach was soon overshadowed by online multiplayer through the increasingly popular Internet, and the service ceased operation in October 1998. Its Japanese division has continued to flourish, evolving into the telecommunications/media company which now operates the Niconico video hosting service and game developer and publisher Spike Chunsoft.

== History ==
DWANGO was created in 1994 by Bob Huntley and Kee Kimbrell in Houston, Texas. Huntley had wanted to transition his company Interactive Visual Systems from providing video training to online gaming services. After completing initial development on the service, the two of them pitched the idea to id Software; John Carmack and other id staff were largely uninterested, but the duo found support in John Romero. Jay Wilbur negotiated a deal for 20% of DWANGO's revenues and Romero worked on the project, releasing the first version of the DWANGO software with the shareware release of Heretic. Since it predated widespread consumer access to the Internet, players had to dial long distance to Houston. Even so, it was wildly popular, and the creators reaped a healthy profit from the subscription fees. Initial players paid $1.95 an hour, but by early 1995 the price dropped and ten thousand subscribers were paying $8.95 a month, some calling from as far as Italy and Australia. The company set up headquarters in New York City. Soon they set up a franchising system. A flat fee of $35,000 was charged to set up a server and the franchisee could keep the rest of the profits. In four months, 22 servers were set up across the country. In 1996, the service expanded to cover Japan, Singapore and South Korea.

By 1997, the company had systems in 23 cities around the world, but its user base was shrinking. In March, Interactive Visual Systems signed a deal with Microsoft to set up a section on the Internet Gaming Zone in an attempt to compete with increasingly popular Internet multiplayer services. The channel officially went live in December 1997; the launch had been delayed due to technical issues with the software that automatically disconnected users from the Internet then connected them to DWANGO's servers. Bob Huntley had hoped the move would increase his service's user base, but it fell short of expectations. DWANGO increasingly relied on its low latency (guaranteed 70 ms or less) to compete with services which were cheaper and offered more content. The "DWANGO Zone" was at the time only one of two pay sections of the site, charging an hourly rate. By this time, rival services such as Mplayer.com, TEN and Heat.net had emerged, offering free multiplayer options in addition to paid services. The company attempted a major marketing initiative earlier in the year that was aborted when they were unable to raise sufficient investment capital. They were also struggling to get developers to add support for DWANGO to their games. Many of the titles supported by the service, such as Quake and Total Annihilation were already playable over the Internet for free. With increased competition and decreasing game support, DWANGO's subscriber base dwindled. It was formally shut down in 1998. However, its division in Japan continued to do well and continued operation as DWANGO Co., Ltd.

== Software and games supported ==
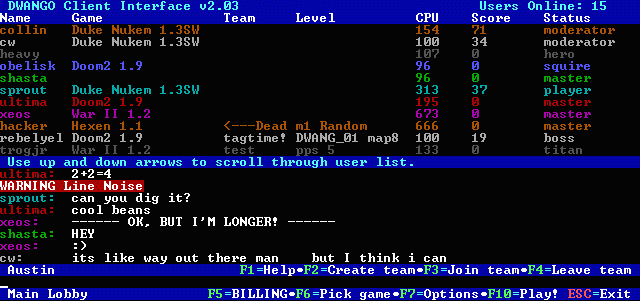
DWANGO client logged onto an Austin, Texas server, showing available games and chat

Users originally ran the DWANGO client software as a DOS application which required booting up independent of Windows 3.1 into DOS mode because of hardware constraints of that era. Servers were represented by area code as during its original inception the only way to log onto DWANGO was via a dial-up modem. The client featured an ASCII interface requiring users to connect via dial-up modem. Once logged in, users could chat in a lobby with other gamers and create their own launchpad for the specific game of their choice. DWANGO originally supported id Software's games, and would later expand to offer games from developers and publishers such as 3D Realms.

Games supported included the following:

- Big Red Racing
- Blood
- Descent II
- Doom
- Doom II: Hell on Earth
- Duke Nukem 3D
- Final Doom
- Heretic
- Hexen: Beyond Heretic
- MechWarrior 2: 31st Century Combat
- Quake
- Quake II
- Shadow Warrior
- Terminal Velocity
- Total Annihilation
- The Ultimate Doom
- Warcraft II: Tides of Darkness
- William Shatner's TekWar
- Witchaven

== See also ==
- XBAND
