= Necrodome =

1996 video game

- Developer: Raven Software
- Publishers: NA: Strategic Simulations; EU: Mindscape
- Directors: Steve Raffel; Michael Raymond-Judy
- Designer: Christopher Foster
- Programmer: Patrick J. Lipo
- Composer: Kevin Schilder
- Platform: Windows
- Release: 30 October 1996
- Genres: First-person shooter, Vehicular combat
- Modes: Single-player, multiplayer

Necrodome is a 1996 first-person vehicular combat game developed by Raven Software and published by Strategic Simulations. Set in a post-apocalyptic United States, players operate a weaponised vehicle known as a Raider to capture the flag in arenas. The game featured a hybrid combat system where players could drive a vehicle or operate its turrets, as well as engage in first-person combat on foot outside the vehicle. Upon release, Necrodome received a mixed reception; critics praised the integration of its hybrid combat into its multiplayer, which supported DirectPlay and Total Entertainment Network services, but disagreed on the execution of the gameplay and vehicle controls, the design of its levels, and the quality of its graphics. Necrodome was remastered and re-released by SNEG for GOG.com in 2023 alongside other titles from the publisher.

== Gameplay ==
Players engage in vehicular combat inside a Raider, which can be exited by the player.

Set in a near post-apocalyptic future in North America, Necrodome is set in Arenas where vehicular combat provides televised and violent entertainment to the public of the New World. Each society across the world has their own Arena within their own city-like states. Players are a driver operating an armoured car named a Raider, and set out to complete The Circuit, a layered stack of Arenas of increasing difficulty leading to the final challenge, named the Necrodome. No one driver has ever survived the entire Circuit, and only one has made it to the Necrodome.

The gameplay objective of Necrodome is to navigate a series of 30 levels in an armoured car known as a Raider, capture a flag, and return it to the player's starting point to complete the level. Returning the flag completes the arena, and unlocks additional levels that players can complete in a non-linear progression by selecting from a map. To navigate across arenas, players must exit the vehicle to operate switches which can unlock doors to new parts of the level. Levels are designed as flat, open areas, with terrain effects such as slippery ice or lava and toxic waste that damages the vehicle. Controls support the use of the computer keyboard, mouse or joystick.

Combat against enemies in the level is undertaken across three modes: in the 'Raider mode', players operate their vehicle and can steer and fire its weapons; a 'turret mode' also allows players to climb into their vehicle's turret to use crosshairs to target lasers at enemies. If the player ejects from their vehicle, or their vehicle is destroyed, 'runner mode' allows players to continue on foot with a shotgun. If players' vehicles are destroyed, a new one spawns at the starting point. Players can fire several weapons from their Raider, with guns that auto-aim and lock on to nearby targets, including lasers, explosives and nukes that can be restocked by collecting ammo dispersed throughout the level.

Necrodome supports networked multiplayer, and could be played over DirectPlay or the online gaming service Total Entertainment Network. Multiplayer modes include co-operative play for two players, where a vehicle is shared with one player driving and the other operating the turret, and two-on-two competitive play for four players.

== Development ==
Developer Raven Software created Necrodome on an engine first developed as a planned sequel to the game CyClones. Smacker was used for the cinematics. A prototype for the PlayStation was previewed in 1995 and advertised for release in 1997, and a 3DO port was also considered. Publisher Mindscape also announced the game as part of its lineup at E3 in 1996. A shareware game demo version of Necrodome was also published on the Raven Software website. Necrodome was released on 30 October 1996. In 2023, the game was remastered by SNEG for GOG.com, alongside other SSI and Mindscape titles including Take No Prisoners and CyClones.

== Reception ==
Reception

Review scores
Publication	Score
CNET Gamecenter	3/5
Computer Games Strategy Plus	4/5
Computer Gaming World	2.5/5
GameSpot	5.4
Joystick	60%
PC Gamer (UK)	56%
PC Gamer (US)	84%
PC Games (DE)	59%
PC PowerPlay	70%
PC Zone	30%

Necrodome received mixed reviews upon release. Critics shared mixed views on the merit of the game's hybrid shooter and vehicular combat; some reviewers found it innovative, whilst others felt it was repetitive and cumbersome. Both PC Gamer and Computer Gaming World considered the switching of combat modes was repetitive and interrupted the game's action, and that there was little for players to do on foot. Different opinions were expressed on the controls: Jason D'Aprile of Computer Games Strategy Plus found the vehicle handling "exceptional" and worth the effort to learn, whilst Steve Faragher of PC Gamer UK faulted the game physics and vehicle handling, stating that it was difficult to navigate and distracted from gameplay.

Necrodome's multiplayer was unanimously praised, with many reviewers having expressed that this mode was more appealing than single-player mode and made the most use of its gameplay. Martin Cirulis of CNET GameCenter felt these play modes were highly enjoyable that best demonstrated the "fun and potential" of a multiposition vehicle. Some lamented the omission of a direct network option.

The level design of Necrodome also received a mixed reception, with some having praised the variety of the environments, whilst others viewed they did not. D'Aprile praised them as "smartly designed" to take advantage of driver and runner modes. Computer Gaming World described the flat levels as "removing chance for ambush and surprise", and Bates wrote that the game's open spaces were not large enough and featured too many dead ends and obstacles to maintain a sensation of speed. The graphics of Necrodome also received mixed assessments, with several critics observing they had demanding technical requirements and poor performance. D'Aprile assessed the visuals as good, but the nature of the scenery "wasn't exactly picturesque". PC Zone considered them "ugly and blocky", and Computer Gaming World stated most levels featured a "dreary look of gloom".

In 2005, Game World Navigator retrospectively assessed the game as "ahead of its time in many ways, pre-empting the hybrid foot and vehicular combat later seen in Battlezone in 1998, but "the game's overall concept left much to be desired".
