= Heretic (video game) =

1994 video game

- Cover art of the mail order release by Brom
- Developer: Raven Software
- Publisher: id Software (Note: R-Comp Interactive published the RISC OS port, while Bethesda Softworks published the 2025 release.)
- Director: Brian Raffel
- Producer: John Romero
- Designers: Michael Raymond-Judy; Eric C. Biessman; Tim Moore
- Programmers: Ben Gokey; Chris Rhinehart
- Artists: Shane Gurno; Brian Raffel; Steve Raffel; Brian Pelletier; James Sumwalt; Matia Wagabaza
- Writer: Brian Raffel
- Composer: Kevin Schilder (Note: The 2025 release featured a new "Tome of Power" arrangement soundtrack by Andrew Hulshult.)
- Engine: Doom engine (Note: The 2025 release uses the KEX Engine.)
- Platforms: DOS; RISC OS
- Release: NA: December 29, 1994 (Note: Shareware Version); NA: January 1995 (Note: Full Version); NA: March 22, 1996 (Note: Shadow of the Serpent Riders); EU: March 31, 1996
- Genre: First-person shooter
- Modes: Single-player, multiplayer

Heretic is a 1994 first-person shooter video game developed by Raven Software and published by id Software. It was distributed by GT Interactive for DOS.

Using a modified version of the Doom engine, Heretic was one of the first first-person games to feature inventory manipulation and the ability to look up and down. It also introduced multiple gib objects that spawned when a character suffered a death by extreme force or heat. Previously, the character would simply crumple into a heap. The game used randomised ambient sounds and noises, such as evil laughter, chains rattling, distantly ringing bells, and water dripping in addition to the background music to further enhance the atmosphere. The music in the game was composed by Kevin Schilder. An indirect sequel, Hexen: Beyond Heretic, was released the following year. Heretic II was released in 1998, which served as a direct sequel continuing the story.

In 2025, Heretic was rereleased by Bethesda Softworks alongside Hexen with a new expansion titled Faith Renewed.

== Plot ==
Three brothers (D'Sparil, Korax, and Eidolon), known as the Serpent Riders, have used their powerful magic to possess seven kings of Parthoris, turning them into mindless puppets and corrupting their armies. The Sidhe elves resist the Serpent Riders' magic, thus prompting the Serpent Riders to declare the Sidhe to be heretics and wage war against them. The Sidhe are forced to take a drastic measure to sever the natural power of the kings, destroying them and their armies at the cost of weakening the elves' power and giving the Serpent Riders an advantage to slay the elders. While the Sidhe retreat, one elf (revealed to be named Corvus in Heretic II) sets off on a quest of vengeance against the weakest of the three Serpent Riders, D'Sparil. He travels through the "City of the Damned", the ruined capital of the Sidhe (its real name is revealed to be Silverspring in Heretic II), then past the demonic breeding grounds of Hell's Maw and finally the secret Dome of D'Sparil.

The player is the elvish protagonist Corvus and must first fight through the undead hordes infesting the location where the elders performed their ritual. At its end is the gateway to Hell's Maw, guarded by the Iron Liches. After defeating them, the player must seal the portal and so prevent further infestation, but after he enters the portal guarded by the Maulotaurs, he finds himself inside D'Sparil's dome. After killing D'Sparil, Corvus ends up on a perilous journey with little hope of returning home. However, he eventually succeeds in his endeavor, only to find that Parthoris is in disarray once again.

== Gameplay ==
The gameplay of Heretic is heavily derived from Doom, with a level-based structure, an armor system, triggers which open concealed chambers filled with enemies, and an emphasis on finding the proper keys to progress. Raven added a number of features to Heretic that differentiated it from Doom, notably interactive environments, such as rushing water that pushes the player character along, and inventory items. In Heretic, the player can pick up certain items to use at their discretion. These items range from health potions to the "morph ovum", which transforms enemies into chickens. The "Tome of Power" acts as a secondary firing mode for certain weapons, resulting in a much more powerful projectile from each weapon, some of which change the look of the projectile entirely. Heretic also features an improved version of the Doom engine, sporting the ability to look up and down within constraints, as well as fly. However, the rendering method for looking up and down merely uses a proportional pixel-shearing effect rather than any new rendering algorithm, which distorts the view considerably when looking at high-elevation angles.

As with Doom, Heretic contains various cheat codes that allow the player to be invulnerable, obtain every weapon, be able to instantly kill every monster in a particular level, and several other abilities. If the player uses the "all weapons and keys" cheat ("IDKFA") from Doom, a message appears warning the player against cheating and takes away all of their weapons, leaving them with only a quarterstaff. If the player uses the "god mode" cheat ("IDDQD") from Doom, the game will display a message saying "Trying to cheat, eh? Now you die!" and kills the player character.

The original shareware release of Heretic came bundled with support for online multiplayer through the then new DWANGO service.

== Development ==
Heretic was developed by Raven Software with assistance by publisher id Software, the latter of which had recently pioneered the first-person shooter genre with Wolfenstein 3D and Doom. According to Brian Raffel, the game's director and vice-president of Raven at the time, the developer first came to id's attention with the release of its debut title Black Crypt. Id had provided Raven with a modified Wolfenstein 3D engine for its next project ShadowCaster and were impressed by the final result. John Romero first proposed Heretic as a medieval themed Doom-like title to the wider id team around November 1993, and Raven signed on shortly afterwards. Raffel considered himself and his colleagues as typical D&D fans and initially drafted the game with role-playing elements, but id did not want the group to vary too much from the Doom format. They then took instruction from id programmer John Carmack to simply "do it like Doom, and add the fantasy flavor."

Heretic began development in March 1994 with Ben Gokey as lead programmer and a rough storyline penned by Michael Raymond-Judy that was finalized by id. John Romero served as executive producer. He recalled visiting the team at Raven, bringing them several Intel-based Epson NeXT computers, and teaching them how to use id's tools and engine. Major additions to the engine for graphics and gameplay included an expendable inventory system; the ability to look up, look down, and fly; water and wind effects on the player character's movement; and improved audio for both ambient and localized sound. Assistant programmer Chris Rhinehart was responsible for adding the flight mechanic, which Raffel described as a "happy accident". The director explained, "Chris came up with the idea of moving the horizon line just up and down. It wasn't a real calculation of flying, it was a hack... That was such a big event for us, and that gave us our unique flavor." Romero visited the studio in late 1994 for finaling and to set up the DWANGO client that would allow online play.

The cover art was illustrated by Gerald Brom, who had previously produced Dungeons & Dragons material, as well as the box for the recently released Doom II.

== Release ==
=== Shadow of the Serpent Riders ===
The original version of Heretic was only available through shareware registration (i.e. mail order) and contained three episodes. The retail version, Heretic: Shadow of the Serpent Riders, was distributed by GT Interactive in 1996, and featured the original three episodes and two additional episodes: The Ossuary, which takes the player to the shattered remains of a world conquered by the Serpent Riders several centuries ago, and The Stagnant Demesne, where the player enters D'Sparil's birthplace. This version was the first official release of Heretic in Europe. A free patch was also downloadable from Raven's website to update the original Heretic with the content found in Shadow of the Serpent Riders.

Along with the two full additional episodes, Shadow of the Serpent Riders contains three additional levels in a third additional episode (unofficially known as Fate's Path) which is inaccessible without the use of cheat codes. The first of these three levels can be accessed by typing the cheat ("ENGAGE61"). The first two levels are fully playable, but the third level does not have an exit so the player is unable to progress further.

=== Source release ===
On January 11, 1999, the source code of the game engine used in Heretic was published by Raven Software under a license that granted rights to non-commercial use, and was re-released under the GNU GPL-2.0-only on September 4, 2008. This resulted in ports to Linux, Amiga, Atari, and other operating systems, and updates to the game engine to utilize 3D acceleration. The shareware version of a console port for the Dreamcast was also released.

=== Re-release and Faith Renewed ===
On August 7, 2025, Bethesda Softworks re-released Heretic and Hexen in a bundle called Heretic + Hexen, developed by Id Software and Nightdive Studios in association with Activision and Raven Software, for Windows, Xbox One, Xbox Series X and S, PlayStation 4, PlayStation 5, and Nintendo Switch. It includes a brand new campaign titled Faith Renewed that has new enemies, maps, and weapons. A new remastered soundtrack was included titled "Tome of Power," arranged by Andrew Hulshult. The game was also made available to select Game Pass members of PC Game Pass and Game Pass Ultimate.

== Reception ==
Reception

Review scores
Publication	Score
Computer Gaming World	5/5
GameSpot	7.6/10
Hyper	90%
Next Generation	4/5
PC Zone	78%
Maximum	4/5

Heretic and Hexen shipped a combined total of roughly 1 million units by August 1997. Individually Heretic sold more than 500,000 copies.

PC Zone remarked that Heretic's weapons are stylistically unsatisfying, the ability to look up and down is useless, the level designs are poorly conceived and confusing, and the flying ability lacks depth and a sense of true flight, more closely resembling "sitting on the front of a forklift truck". While they regarded the inventory mechanic as genuinely innovative, they felt that overall Heretic failed to differentiate itself from Doom to the extent of contemporaries such as Descent and Star Wars: Dark Forces, and concluded, "Not as good as Doom 1 or 2. Still fun, but I'd rather wait for Quake, thanks."

Next Generation stated that "If you're only going to get one action game in the next couple of months, this is the one."

While remarking that Heretic is a thinly veiled clone of Doom, and that its being released in Europe after its sequel and with Quake due out shortly makes it somewhat outdated, Maximum nonetheless regarded it as an extremely polished and worthwhile purchase. They particularly highlighted the two additional episodes of the retail version, saying they offer a satisfying challenge even to first person shooter veterans and are largely what make the game worth buying.

In 1996, Computer Gaming World listed being turned into a chicken as #3 on its list of "the 15 best ways to die in computer gaming".

== Legacy ==
Heretic has received three sequels: Hexen: Beyond Heretic, Hexen II, and Heretic II. Following ZeniMax Media's acquisition of id Software in 2009, Activision owns the intellectual property of the game while Bethesda owns the publishing rights; this has been resolved by the 2025 release after both companies were acquired by Microsoft Gaming.

The game was re-released for Windows on Steam on August 3, 2007.

Further homages to the series have been made in other id Software titles; In 2009's Wolfenstein, which Raven Software developed, Heretic's Tomes of Power are collectible power-ups found throughout the game. The character Galena from Quake Champions wears armor bearing the icon of the Serpent Riders.

In 2014, Raven co-founder Brian Raffel had expressed interest in making a sequel to the Heretic series. Rather than licensing it to other developers, he wants Raven to do it themselves.

Similar to Freedoom, a free content adaptation of Heretic exists called Blasphemer.

== Sources ==
- Romero, John (2023). Doom Guy: Life in First Person. New York: Abrams Press. ISBN 978-1-4197-5811-9. OCLC 1389830938.
