= Human Head Studios =

American video game developer

Human Head Studios, Inc.
- Type: Private
- Industry: Video games
- Founded: October 1997; 29 years ago
- Founders: Ben Gokey; Shane Gurno; Ted Halsted; Paul MacArthur; Chris Rhinehart; James Sumwalt
- Defunct: November 13, 2019; 6 years ago
- Successor: Roundhouse Studios
- Headquarters: Madison, Wisconsin, U.S.
- Key people: Chris Rhinehart; Paul MacArthur; Ben Gokey; Ted Halsted; Jim Sumwalt; Shane Gurno
- Products: Rune; Prey

Human Head Studios, Inc. was an American video game developer located in Madison, Wisconsin.

== History ==
Human Head Studios was founded in October 1997 by a group of six developers formerly from Raven Software: Ben Gokey, Chris Rhinehart, Paul MacArthur, Ted Halsted, James Sumwalt, and Shane Gurno—later joined by game producer Tim Gerritsen as co-owner in June 1998. Regarding the origin of the studio's name, Gerritsen explained: "When the guys were thinking of leaving Raven Software, someone posted a message via e-mail that they had lost some money. This started people saying they had lost all sorts of things. One person posted that they had misplaced a bag of human heads and this gave the inspiration for the name." Their first game was Rune, a third-person Viking action game. The company also worked on the long-anticipated first-person shooter Prey, a game that was executive produced by 3D Realms.

On April 20, 2007, a news report indicated that the company's headquarters were partially destroyed in a fire. No injuries were reported. On October 1, 2007, the company moved back into its newly renovated offices. In 2014, Human Head announced that it has revived a multiplayer video game called Minimum from TimeGate Studios, which filed for bankruptcy in 2013. Their final major release was the infamous The Quiet Man, an action-adventure beat-em-up published by Square Enix which features full-motion video cutscenes.

On November 13, 2019, the studio announced its closure, immediately after the release of Rune II. The whole team subsequently formed a new studio, Roundhouse Studios, under ZeniMax Media. Chris Rhinehart of Human Head/Roundhouse stated that "Sadly, we had to wind down the business of Human Head Studios and close its doors", but had been able to reach out to ZeniMax to establish this new studio. Roundhouse Studios was closed without releasing any games in May 2024, only having codeveloped Redfall with Arkane Austin, and its team was moved to ZeniMax Online Studios.

== Games developed ==
Year	Title	Publisher(s)	Platform(s)
2000	Rune	Gathering of Developers	Microsoft Windows, macOS, Linux
2000	Blair Witch Volume II: The Legend of Coffin Rock	Gathering of Developers	Microsoft Windows
2001	Rune: Halls of Valhalla	Gathering of Developers	Microsoft Windows
2001	Rune: Viking Warlord	Take-Two Interactive	PlayStation 2
2004	Dead Man's Hand	Atari, SA	Xbox, Microsoft Windows
2006	Prey	2K Games	Microsoft Windows, Xbox 360, macOS, Linux
2011	Brink	Bethesda Softworks	Microsoft Windows, PlayStation 3, Xbox 360
2012	Fort Courage	Human Head Studios	iOS
2013	Defiance	Trion Worlds	Microsoft Windows, PlayStation 3, Xbox 360
2014	Minimum	Atari, SA	Microsoft Windows
2015	Lost Within	Amazon Game Studios	iOS, Android
2015	Dungeon Defenders II	Trendy Entertainment	Xbox One, PlayStation 4
2018	The Quiet Man	Square Enix	Microsoft Windows, PlayStation 4
2018	Survived By	Digital Extremes	Microsoft Windows
2019	Rune II	Ragnarok Game, LLC	Microsoft Windows

=== Cancelled ===
- Prey 2

=== As Roundhouse Studios ===
Year	Title	Publisher(s)	Platform(s)
2023	Redfall	Bethesda Softworks	Microsoft Windows, Xbox Series X/S
