= The Quiet Man (video game) =

2018 video game

- Developer: Human Head Studios
- Publisher: Square Enix
- Producer: Kensei Fujinaga
- Programmer: Shaun Nivens
- Artist: Ashley Welch
- Writer: Joe Kelly
- Engine: Unreal Engine 4
- Platforms: Microsoft Windows; PlayStation 4
- Release: November 1, 2018
- Genres: Action-adventure, beat 'em up
- Mode: Single-player

The Quiet Man is a 2018 action-adventure beat 'em up video game developed by Human Head Studios and published by Square Enix for Microsoft Windows and PlayStation 4. The game's story is told through lengthy full motion video sequences, some of which feature live-action actors, inserted between the gameplay sequences. It features a deaf protagonist, reflected by muted sound with no subtitles in most of the cutscenes.

The Quiet Man received generally unfavorable reviews, with the complaints stemming from issues with the story, the underdeveloped gameplay sequences, and the lack of commitment displayed towards the deafness element of the game. In response, the audio was restored in a post-release update as an optional feature.

== Gameplay ==
Most of the game consists of full motion videos and extended cutscenes, but players participate most intensely during combat scenarios. Wordless on screen symbols explain how combat can proceed. Players have the option of punching, kicking, and evasion, as well as combination moves. There is also a "focus" mode where players can "beat down" their opponent with a flurry of blows.

== Plot ==
A young, deaf boy from New York City named Dane interrupts a quarrel between his friend, Taye, and a bully, Isaac, that results in Dane's mother Lorraine getting shot when Taye and Isaac struggle over a gun. Isaac takes credit for the killing and is arrested while Taye runs away. Dane's policeman father, Robert, blames Dane for his wife's death and becomes abusive toward him. Dane, traumatized by these events, makes up a character in his drawings named "The Quiet Man", who resembles a plague doctor.

Years later, Dane serves as an enforcer for Taye, who runs a nightclub and leads an American Mafia-styled mob. Taye expresses concern about his girlfriend, a singer named Lala (who appears identical to Lorraine), who has been receiving mysterious letters addressed to her by a stalker. After Dane escorts Lala to the nightclub, her performance is interrupted by an ambush from SOL 33, a rival gang led by Isaac. The stalker, who looks like the "Quiet Man", kidnaps Lala during the confusion. Taye's associate B-Money requests that Dane inform Taye about a potential gang war, but Dane prepares to recover Lala on his own. B-Money tells Taye anyway, inciting the mob boss's anger.

Dane tracks Lala's trail throughout the city, leading him to Isaac's penthouse, where the two fight; Dane throws him out a window and rescues Lala. While the two escape the building they encounter Taye, who angrily believes that Dane is the stalker and tried to trick Taye into a gang war with Isaac out of jealously over Lala. Lala explains to Taye that she faked her own kidnapping, but Taye decides to have them both killed. Robert, now a detective, appears and saves them both.

As Dane and Robert pursue Taye to his office, Taye shoots Robert and tries to explain to Dane that the death of Lorraine was an accident. Taye is interrupted by Lala before he can shoot Dane, and Taye chases her up to the roof. A wounded Robert encourages Dane to put on the Quiet Man's mask to save Lala. As The Quiet Man, Dane confronts Taye and fights off his men. After his defeat at Dane's hands, Taye attempts to shoot Lala before Dane takes the bullet for her. Injured, Dane reawakens with supernatural abilities, and kills Taye. Robert appears wearing another Quiet Man mask and reveals he was the stalker, helping Lala fake her own kidnapping in order to manipulate Dane into killing both Isaac and Taye to get revenge for Lorraine's death. Dane and Robert fight, before both collapse from their injuries.

In a post-credits scene, Dane is released from prison and reconciles with Robert.

== Development and release ==
The Quiet Man was announced during Square Enix's press conference at E3 2018. To give an insight of the game's concept, a series of planned producer letters by Kensei Fujinaga were posted on the game's Twitter account. The first one dated July 2, 2018 explains the power of "words". On August 9, 2018, Fujinaga hosted a special livestream showcasing the gameplay, story, and cinematic.

Man of Action Studios, a group of comic book writers helped create The Quiet Man's story. One of the game's greatest challenges was to make the game have an action feel, but eliminate much of the traditional menus and bars that track battle progress and abilities in most games in order to retain a cinematic feel.

The Quiet Man was released on November 1, 2018, for PlayStation 4 and Microsoft Windows. A downloadable patch for the game named Answered, which provides a second play-through that restores the sounds, dialogue and soundtrack to the game was released a week later, on November 8, 2018.

== Reception ==
Reception

Aggregate score
Aggregator	Score
Metacritic	PC: 40/100; PS4: 28/100

Review scores
Publication	Score
Destructoid	4/10
Eurogamer	Avoid
Game Informer	3/10
GameSpot	2/10
IGN	5.5/10
Push Square	2/10

The teaser trailer was met with a mixed critical response. Shack News, Press-Start and ComicsBeat found it interesting. Polygon, SegmentNext and Screen Rant labeled it conceptually intriguing. Destructoid named it bizarre. The Ball State Daily News thought that the transition between video game footage and live-action in the trailer didn't go well, as well as criticizing the title for resembling the film The Bye Bye Man.

The Quiet Man received "generally unfavorable reviews" according to review aggregator Metacritic. It was Metacritic's Official Worst Game of 2018, meaning it was the lowest-scoring of 2018. PC Gamer described the game as a "spectacular disaster" and added "there are lots of bad games, but for a game that was announced at E3 and made by a major publisher and studio to be this catastrophic is something." Destructoid gave it a 4 out of 10, stating that the game failed to deliver on its advertisement of "high-production live action, realistic CG and pulse-pounding action gameplay", and though it had some high points, "they soon [gave] way to glaring faults." IGN gave it a 5.5 out of 10, praising the live action cutscenes game for being comparable to a well-made episode of a TV show, though he highly criticized the gameplay for being a lackluster button-masher.
