= Prey 2 =

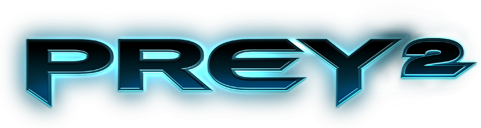
- Developer: Human Head Studios
- Publisher: Bethesda Softworks
- Director: Chris Rhinehart
- Designers: Ben Gokey; Ted Halsted; Nathan Cheever
- Programmer: Paul MacArthur
- Artists: James Sumwalt; Randy Redetzke
- Writer: Jason L. Blair
- Composers: Jason Graves; Mark Morgan
- Engine: id Tech 4
- Platforms: Microsoft Windows, PlayStation 3, Xbox 360
- Release: Cancelled
- Genre: First-person shooter
- Mode: Single-player

Prey 2 was a cancelled first-person shooter game developed by Human Head Studios and to be published by Bethesda Softworks. It was planned as a sequel to Prey (2006).

Though Prey 2 was announced by 3D Realms in 2006, a few months after release of the first game, development work at Human Head Studios did not begin in earnest until 2009, after the rights for Prey had transferred from 3D Realms ultimately to ZeniMax Media, the parent company of Bethesda. Bethesda formally announced their title in early 2011, which revealed a change of the player's main character and of gameplay to a more open world game. Human Head quietly ceased development on the game in late 2011 for unstated reasons despite having progressed to a near alpha release state. Subsequently, several industrial rumors circulated that Prey 2 had been cancelled or changed developers, including evidence that Arkane Studios had taken over development. Bethesda formally cancelled the game in 2014, stating it was not meeting their expectations. Later in 2016, Bethesda announced that a loose reboot of the series, Prey, was set for release in 2017 and was under development by Arkane, who had taken the concepts and thematic elements of Prey but scrapped any previous work on Prey 2 in favor of a largely unrelated project.

== Plot ==
The story of Prey 2 had been narratively tied to the first game. In Prey, an alien spacecraft called the Sphere appears over the southwestern portion of the United States and starts abducting humans and other objects as part of its cycle to sustain its resource supply and its organic crew. One of those abducted is Domasi "Tommy" Tawodi who, in part due to his spirit guide from his Native American background, is able to navigate the Sphere, defeat hostile alien forces, and succeed in freeing captive humans and other lifeforms from the intelligence that controls it, before returning to earth.

Prey 2 was to focus on U.S. Marshal Killian Samuels, who starts the game on a passenger flight which suddenly crashes onto the Sphere, shown during the events of Prey. At the end of a short battle with some aliens he is knocked unconscious, after which the plot jumps forward several years. Samuels is now a bounty hunter on the alien world Exodus. Though he is aware of his profession and has retained his skills, he has no memory of what happened in the time that passed since his abduction. He initially believes himself to be the only human on Exodus until he runs into Tommy, whom he has apparently met in the period he no longer remembers. Killian then resumes his bounty hunter activities while recovering his memory. Some of the game's audio logs, published by the Museum of Play, suggested that Tommy and Killian team up to fight common foes, some which are enemies that Tommy had made from within the first Prey.

== Development under 3D Realms/Radar Group ==
The first Prey game was released in July 2006; it had been developed by Human Head Studios, under contract with 3D Realms, and published by 2K Games. The game was considered successful; it had received Metacritic aggregate scores of 83 and 79 for the Xbox 360 and Microsoft Windows versions, respectively, and by October 2006, over one million units had been sold according to 3D Realms' Scott Miller. Miller announced as early as August 2006 that development on a sequel, Prey 2, had started.

In June 2007, Miller co-founded a brand-management organization Radar Group, which was designed to help fledgling development studios bring their games to publishers and distributors. Prey 2 was one of three titles that Radar Group announced it was backing in March 2008, along with Earth No More and Incarnate. At this point, Prey 2 was described to be a narrative sequel to Prey. In the game, Tommy abandons Earth as he is accused of the disappearance of his family and his girlfriend. At this point in development, Prey 2 would have continued to be a first-person shooter using the portal/gravity-based gameplay as from the original game.

During 2009, the rights to the Prey trademark changed hands; in June, 3D Realms transferred the trademark to Radar Group, who subsequently transferred it to ZeniMax Media, the parent company of Bethesda Softworks, by July. GameSpot noted that these events occurred shortly after ZeniMax's acquisition of id Software in June 2009. That September, ZeniMax filed several additional trademark applications for the Prey name associated with video games, including clothing and merchandise.

According to Human Head's associate producer Matt Bisenius, all the previous work on the game up to its acquisition by ZeniMax/Bethesda was "bouncing ideas around" rather than any detailed development, believing 3D Realms/Radar Group had announced this sequel too early. As they started more in-depth planning and development for the game, the team came to an idea of a bounty hunter, and decided to take the core ideas from Prey while providing a game with more activities for the player to do, partially inspired by the then-recent release of Red Dead Redemption. Bisenius noted that "We didn't look at Prey 1 and pick out mistakes as much as look at it and pick out the core themes of Prey."

== Development under Bethesda ==
A screenshot from Prey 2 during its development, c. August 2011, demonstrating the alien open world setting

Bethesda re-announced Prey 2 in March 2011 for a planned 2012 release. Human Head Studios would continue to be the developer of this game. The announced game had several major changes from what had been described before while it was under development at 3D Realms/Radar Group, including the game in gameplay style as an open world game, and the shift of narrative from Tommy to Killian. Though the team had access to the newer id Tech 5 engine, they had been working since 2009 on a modified id Tech 4 engine that they opted to retain that engine. Project lead Chris Rhinehart said "Prey 2 will provide gamers the opportunity to explore a new facet of the Prey universe, one that offers fast-paced action in an open, alien world. We're excited to show gamers the title we have been working on and hope they will be as excited by this title as we are." According to Pete Hines, the vice president of public relations and marketing at Bethesda, the current version of the game is what the developers wanted to make and not what has been announced before by the Radar Group. Human Head shared footage of their version of Prey 2 with the Strong National Museum of Play in March 2018.

For unstated reasons, Human Head had quietly stopped development of Prey 2 near the end of 2011, after having spent about two years of development on the title. Rhinehart said that at this point, "It was very close to an alpha state, with all major content pieces represented," and that they were at the point where they as developer would start working more closely with the publisher to determine what elements to keep or trim to progress further. Norm Nazaroff of Human Head believed they had added much more content and technical innovations to the title, as to make it "one of the best looking games of the [then-current] console generation". Another Human Head employee, Jason Blair, who had worked on narrative elements for Prey 2, said that reasons for ending development were "political" and "petty".

Issues regarding the development were not reported to the public at large, and due to a lack of direct information from either Bethesda or Human Head, many considered Prey 2 to have entered development hell and creating speculation at its fate. In March 2012, rumors of Prey 2's cancellation began to circle; neither ZeniMax or Bethesda commented on this rumor. Instead, in the following month, they stated the game would be delayed, and fail to make the 2012 release, though no new release window was given. Bethesda stated "the game's development [had] not progressed satisfactorily", and "the game [did] not currently meet [their] quality standards". Further concerns were raised when Bethesda removed Prey 2 from their website in August 2012, stating to Eurogamer that for the present they need to focus the site on upcoming titles.

Kotaku reported in May 2013 that development of Prey 2 had moved to the Austin, Texas division of Arkane Studios, who at the time were completing their work on Dishonored. Kotaku's report claimed that because of the rumored split between Human Head and Bethesda, Bethesda had been "shopping around" for a developer to pick up the title. Among those that had been rumored to be considered included Obsidian Entertainment, who were said to have worked on the title for a few months, and Rebellion Developments, who refused the offer. From this report, additional rumors surfaced including that the work that Human Head had completed by this point was only for a demonstration version and far from a completed game, a claim denied by Human Head developers. Arkane, Bethesda or ZeniMax did not comment on this information at this time, but Hines denied rumors of Arkane's involvement in early August 2013. However, a week after this, several internal emails from Arkane revealed that they had been approved to work on Prey 2, which they wanted to mold as a spiritual successor to System Shock. To this end, Arkane scrapped all of the previous work by Human Head for their vision of the game. Neither Arkane or Bethesda have commented on these reports.

Reasoning on Human Head's departure from the project by 2011 are not fully known, though IGN, based on reports from those involved with Bethesda and Human Head, stated in 2013 that a rift had developed between the companies. As claimed by IGN, Bethesda had been pleased by progress up through the Electronic Entertainment Expo 2011 showing in June, and agreed to give Human Head an additional six months or more on the project to complete the game and still make the planned 2012 release; however, this extension was not written into their contract. As Bethesda had expressed interest in buying out Human Head, one of the few studios capable of working atop the id Tech engines, the publisher started "to play hardball" with Human Head. Bethesda pushed harder on milestones and requesting additional features for Prey 2 that would normally have been given appropriate time and monetized in payment to Human Head in the extension contract language if it were in writing. As Human Head was contractually only allowed to work on Prey 2, they had to quietly support other games like BioShock Infinite and Defiance as to pay their mounting bills. At this point, around November 2011, Bethesda pushed on its offer to buy the studio, but Human Head denied the offer, and they stopped work on Prey 2, which they considered like a strike. Though the companies attempted some negotiations, no progress was made, and once Human Head's contract with Bethesda ran out in 2012, Prey 2 fell back into Bethesda's hands while Human Head proceeded onto other projects. In a 2016 interview, Bethesda's Hines denied the rumors that Bethesda wanted to acquire Human Head at that point, stating that they work well with third-party developers. Hines further expressed that it would be "nonsense" for the idea that they invested millions into Prey 2 only to stop the game without recouping their expenses for arbitrary reasons, and affirmed that "the game didn't turn out like we wanted. It didn't work, and it didn't happen."

== Cancellation ==
In October 2014, during PAX Australia, Bethesda officially cancelled Prey 2. Hines stated, "It was a game we believed in, but we never felt that it got to where it needed to be –– we never saw a path to success if we finished it. It wasn't up to our quality standard, and we decided to cancel it. It's no longer in development. That wasn't an easy decision, but it's one that won't surprise many folks given that we hadn't been talking about it. Human Head Studios is no longer working on it. It's a franchise we still believe we can do something with — we just need to see what that something is." Tim Gerritsen, business development director at Human Head Studios, said, "While we are disappointed that we won't be able to deliver our vision of the game, we remain proud of our work on the franchise, which we feel speaks for itself, including the award-winning presentation of the game at E3 2011. We enjoyed working with the many talented people at Bethesda, and we wish them all the best of luck with any future plans they may have for the franchise."

== Reboot ==
Bethesda announced at their press conference at the Electronic Entertainment Expo 2016 in June that they would be publishing a reboot of Prey, also titled Prey, to be developed by Arkane Studios. This game will not use any of the materials developed for Prey 2, outside of the IP and the franchise concepts. Arkane Studios CEO and director Raphaël Colantonio said that at the time of completing Dishonored, they sought to do a second project alongside Dishonored 2, one that was "in first-person, with depth and simulation and narration", and that they opted to use the Prey premise as it matched these thematic concepts well, but otherwise greatly different in gameplay. Hines added that when considering the core concept of the original 2006 Prey was about aliens chasing after the player-character, they felt the name worked well for the game that Arkane had pitched, and claimed they did not have to be beholden to retaining anything else about the original game. This gave Arkane's team the freedom to complete their game without considering the franchise's past history.

== Impact ==
In addition to reporting on the Prey property being transferred to Arkane in May 2015, the website Kotaku had some other incidents in which they had reported on projects from Bethesda through inside information well before they were to be announced publicly. As a result, Bethesda indefinitely blacklisted Kotaku in October 2015, denying the site any pre-release review copies or access to their spokesmen or developers at game conference events or via interview. The 2017 Prey game includes an achievement "Press Sneak", based on reading all the emails within computer terminals in the game, based on this incident.

The team would come full circle after the 2019 closure of Human Head Studios shortly after the release of Rune II with most of the staff moving on to Bethesda-managed Roundhouse Studios.
