= Dead Man's Hand (video game) =

2004 video game

- Developer: Human Head Studios
- Publisher: Atari
- Programmers: Ben Gokey; Toby Jones; Jimmy Shin
- Composers: Rom Di Prisco; Michael Larson
- Engine: Unreal Engine 2
- Platforms: Xbox, Microsoft Windows
- Release: Xbox: NA: March 2, 2004; EU: April 29, 2004; Windows: NA: March 16, 2004; EU: April 2, 2004
- Genre: First-person shooter
- Modes: Single-player, multiplayer

Dead Man's Hand is a first-person shooter game developed by Human Head Studios and published by Atari. It was released in North America for Xbox and Microsoft Windows in March 2004. The game takes place in the American frontier.

== Story ==
El Tejon was a member of the notorious "Nine" who was betrayed because he did not join the gang to murder women and children, but to be famous and rich and seeking a chance to make a name for himself, as a gunslinger. The Leader of the Nine shoots him and leaves him for dead. However General San Juan Jacinto Blanco found El Tejon and threw him in a jail cell to rot. But Tejon's cellmate Iago is the leader of a revolution that will free both Iago and Tejon to exact vengeance on those who betrayed them.

== Plot ==
1890s Mexico

Tejon is a young gunslinger who joins the gang The Nine. While he enjoys robbing banks and trains, he is not as bloodthirsty as his associates, this eventually leads to a fallout. His leader- Tennessee Vic shoots him in cold blood.

After Tejon is left for dead by Tennessee Vic, he is found by the corrupt General Blanco who leaves him to rot in a prison. Tejon's cellmate is the leader of the resistance fighting the general. His men come to free him and Tejon.

Tejon's first trip is to Sanchez. He was the drunk of the group but also known to find hideouts for the group. After gunning down Sanchez and his men. He is approached by his former lover who hears about it and seeks to aid in his quest. He refuses saying it is personal and dangerous.

Flat Iron is Tejon's next target. Flat Iron is a renegade Comanche whose skilled with knives. He is a much more formidable opponent, on the account of his speed and sharp knives. After confronting Flat Iron, Tejon kills him.

In between missions, Tejon hunts down a criminal known simply as BlackJack- an overweight drunk- who’s a crack shot with a rifle.

Tejon then confronts “Numbers”. Numbers was the banker of the group. He was also seen as cowardly and easily pushed around. Numbers heard about Sanchez and prepares. Tejon also kills him with ease. Along the way Tejon, picks up bounties who are either helpful to find the nine or extra money.

He goes to the lumber mill owned by Big Guns Grissom, the strongman of the Nine. What he lacks in intelligence he makes up for in brute force. He proves to be a more tough opponent as he is capable of throwing axes with accuracy. Tejon confronts him and blows up what is left of his mill.

Next on the list is Father Zeke, a jacklegged preacher who hustles his congregations to help build his lavish lifestyle. He often quotes scripture when taunting his enemies. His signature weapon is whiskey bombs. Tejon confronts him in one of his churches, after he kills Zeke, he goes to his house and destroys it.

Remembering that his cellmate Iago needs his help, Tejon goes back to Mexico to fight General Blanco. While he is battling the general, he rallies to the remaining rebels and defeats him once and for all.

He then returns to the trail of the Nine. He is seeking a well known gambler, whose name is Kendall. Kendall has local connections and uses them to hide. Tejon kills the sons of the local madam who knows where Kendall is. He then confronts the Madam himself. After killing her, he is able to clear a path to his own friend. Kendall is the smooth talker and ladies man of the Nine. Known to be a quick draw when needed. He too is a much harder opponent to kill as he is crafty and shrewd. Tejon finds him and kills him at his saloon.

Tejon is once again confronted by his lover, he agrees to let her help after they find themselves hunted by now Senator Vic’s corrupted marshal corps.

With not many enemies left- he begins to hunt for the Twins- two identical twins who can read each other’s mind. He travels to find their lumber mill and kills them both.

Vic now has prepared for Tejon’s arrival, he has a trained fitted with mercenaries and marshals to stop Tejon. When he guns his way through, Vic admits he never wanted to kill Tejon because he viewed him as a son, but Tejon refuses, as Vic attempts to flee, Tejon blows up the tracks and the train crashes, both men survive. What’s left of Vic’s bodyguards try to kill Tejon but he dispatches them once and for all. Vic now left defenseless is killed- Tejon and his lover both ride off in the sunset, with his revenge now gone full circle.

== Gameplay ==
The game is somewhat unusual in that between levels, the player plays poker for extra health and ammunition. The character is armed with four default weapons; a knife, a pistol, a rifle and a shotgun. Other weapons that can be found are TNT and Whisky bombs. The player can shoot objects such as whisky bottles, cans and enemies to score legend points, thus filling up the "trick shot" meter that lets the character use the secondary mode of firing which varies depending on the current weapon. The combat in the game also makes use of the game's physics engine, with the player being able to trigger physics based traps such as shooting a rock and causing it to fall onto an enemy below - kills obtained this way are rewarded with extra points and a greater increase in the "trick shot" meter.

== Development ==
The game was originally set to release in Fall 2003.

== Reception ==
Reception

Aggregate score
Aggregator	Score	
Aggregator	PC	Xbox
Metacritic	63/100	62/100

Review scores
Publication	Score	
Publication	PC	Xbox
1Up.com	D+	N/A
Computer Games Magazine	3/5	N/A
Computer Gaming World	2/5	N/A
Edge	N/A	3/10
Electronic Gaming Monthly	N/A	5.33/10
Eurogamer	N/A	4/10
Famitsu	N/A	27/40
Game Informer	N/A	7.75/10
GamePro	N/A	4/5
GameSpot	6.6/10	6/10
GameZone	N/A	6.8/10
IGN	6.2/10	6/10
Official Xbox Magazine (US)	N/A	6.5/10
PC Gamer (US)	75%	N/A
Playboy	N/A	88%
The Times	4/5	4/5

Dead Man's Hand received "mixed" reviews on both platforms according to the review aggregation website Metacritic. In Japan, where the Xbox version was ported for release as part of the Xbox World Collection on September 2, 2004, Famitsu gave it a score of two sevens, one six, and one seven for a total of 27 out of 40.

Playboy gave the Xbox version an early review, over three months before it was released Stateside, and stated, "A unique scoring system lets you unlock killer trick shots - if ya ain't a coward that is." The Times gave the game four stars out of five and stated, "The Wild West theme lends itself well to the FPS treatment, and the primitive weaponry brings an almost liberating freedom to the gameplay. Given the game's fairly tame content, its 16+ age rating seems harsh." However, Maxim gave it three stars out of five, saying, "The concept and play consistently deal a royal flush, [but] just ignore the choppy visuals, which can irritate like a pesky infection picked up at Miss Kitty's Cat House." 1Up.com gave the PC version a D+ and ended their review by writing: "Mostly, Dead Man's Hand is a long exercise in target practice, with lifeless enemies in dull levels. There's no saving during a mission, the graphics are weak, and there's no team-based action. What's worse, there's just no depth, artistry, or genuine thrills to be had. This roundup ain't worth the saddle sores."
