= Hexen II =

1997 video game

- Developer: Raven Software
- Publisher: id Software
- Director: Brian Raffel
- Producer: Steve Stringer
- Designer: Eric C. Biessman
- Programmers: Rick Johnson; Ben Gokey
- Artist: Brian Pelletier
- Composer: Kevin Schilder
- Engine: Modified Quake engine
- Platforms: Windows, Mac OS
- Release: Windows: NA: September 11, 1997; EU: September 19, 1997; Portal of Praevus: NA: March 20, 1998; EU: 1998; Macintosh: NA: July 2002
- Genre: First-person shooter
- Modes: Single-player, multiplayer

Hexen II is a 1997 first-person shooter game developed by Raven Software and published by id Software for Windows. It is the third game in the Hexen/Heretic series, and the last in the Serpent Riders trilogy. Using a modified Quake engine, it features single-player and multiplayer game modes, as well as four character classes to choose from, each with different abilities. These include the "offensive" Paladin, the "defensive" Crusader, the spell-casting Necromancer, and the stealthy Assassin.

Improvements from Hexen: Beyond Heretic and Quake include destructible environments, mounted weapons, and unique level up abilities. Like its predecessor, Hexen II also uses a hub system. These hubs are a number of interconnected levels; changes made in one level have effects in another. Furthermore, the Tome of Power artifact makes a return from Heretic.

== Gameplay ==
The gameplay of Hexen II is very similar to that of the original Hexen. Instead of three classes, Hexen II features four: Paladin, Crusader, Assassin, and Necromancer, each with their own unique weapons and play style.

Hexen II also adds certain role-playing video game elements to the mix. Each character has a series of statistics which increase as they gain experience. This then causes the player character to grow in power as his or her HP and mana increases.

== Plot ==
Thyrion is a world that was enslaved by the Serpent Riders. The two previous games in the series documented the liberation of two other worlds, along with the death of their Serpent Rider overlords. Now, the oldest and most powerful of the three Serpent Rider brothers, Eidolon, must be defeated to free Thyrion. Eidolon is supported by his four generals, themselves a reference to the Four Horsemen of the Apocalypse. To confront each general, the player has to travel to four different continents, each possessing a distinct theme (Medieval European for Blackmarsh, Mesoamerican for Mazaera, Ancient Egyptian for Thysis, and Greco-Roman for Septimus). Then, finally, the player returns to Blackmarsh in order to confront Eidolon himself inside of his own dominion Cathedral.

== Development ==
What was originally supposed to be the final game in a trilogy, the sequel to Hexen was originally titled Hecatomb but was abandoned after John Romero left id Software in 1996. Activision, the distributor at the time, pressured Raven Software to split development of Hecatomb into two different games, Hexen II and Heretic II. Activision felt that the previous entries in the series, Heretic and Hexen, were different enough from one another that they should treat them as separate entities going forward, instead of just one final game to complete a trilogy. Only a select few ideas of Romero's from Hecatomb would ultimately make their way into what became Hexen II and Heretic II.

Hexen II was based on an enhanced version of the Quake engine. Hexen II, by way of the Quake engine, uses OpenGL for 3D acceleration. However, due to the prevalence of 3dfx hardware at the time of release, the Windows version of the game installs an OpenGL ICD (opengl32.dll) designed specifically for 3dfx's hardware. This driver acts as a wrapper for the proprietary Glide API, and thus is only compatible with 3dfx hardware. Custom OpenGL drivers were also released by PowerVR and Rendition for running Hexen II with their respective (and also now defunct) products. Removal of the ICD allows the game to use the default OpenGL system library. Much of the music in this game is remixed versions of the soundtracks of Hexen and Heretic to match the hub themes.

Activision acquired the rights to publish versions of the game for the PlayStation and Sega Saturn. Neither port was released.

Hexen II was made available on Steam on August 3, 2007.

=== Siege ===
A modification titled Siege was created and released by Raven Software in 1998 using updated QuakeWorld architecture, aptly dubbed "HexenWorld". The production concept was to eliminate a normal deathmatch environment in favor of a teamplay castle siege. The basic premise was to divide the players into two teams—attackers and defenders—with each side either assaulting or protecting the castle respectively. At the end of the time limit, whichever team controlled the crown was declared victorious. The mod featured appropriate objects used in the single-player portion of the game, namely catapults and ballistae. The classes were drastically altered with new weapons and abilities, reflecting the departure from the normal deathmatch experience presented in HexenWorld.

=== Source release ===
Following the tradition from Heretic and Hexen, Raven released the source code of the Hexen II engine on November 10, 2000. This time the source was released under the GNU GPL-2.0-only, allowing source ports to be made to different platforms like Linux and the Dreamcast.

== Portal of Praevus ==
An expansion pack called Hexen II Mission Pack: Portal of Praevus was released on April 1, 1998. It features new levels, new enemies and a new playable character class, The Demoness. It focuses on the attempted resurrection of the three Serpent Riders by the evil wizard Praevus, and takes place in a fifth continent, Tulku, featuring a Sino-Tibetan setting. Unlike the original game, the expansion was not published by id Software, and as such is not currently available via digital re-releases.

The expansion features new quest items, new enemies, and new weapons for the Demoness. She is the only player class to have a ranged starting weapon (similar to the Mage class in the original Hexen), whereas all other characters start with melee weapons. It also introduced minor enhancements to the game engine, mostly related to user interface, level scripts, particle effects (rain or snow), and 3D objects. Portal of Praevus also features a secret (easter egg) skill level, with respawning monsters. The only released patch for the expansion added respawning of certain items (such as health and ammo) in Nightmare mode, so that it would be slightly easier for playing.

== Reception ==
Reception

Aggregate score
| Aggregator | Score |
|---|---|
| GameRankings | 84% 65% (Portal of Praevus) |

Review scores
| Publication | Score |
|---|---|
| Edge | 8/10 |
| GameSpot | 7.3/10; 8.6/10 (Portal of Praevus) |

Upon its release, Hexen II received generally positive reviews. Edge praised the game for being different from other Quake engine-based games, highlighting its inventive and interactive levels, enemy variety, and artificial intelligence. The magazine also credited the game's diversity of weapons and spells for offering different combat strategies. GameSpot summarized, "Hexen II is a game with many strengths – its design is superior to the original Hexen, it has a significant payoff for single players winding through its twisted corridors, and visually it is without equal in the action genre. But the game's attempt to break from the standard first-person shooter mold has some nasty side effects, and the end result is a confusing and often frustratingly difficult experience." The reviewer elaborated that while the lush, detailed environments and astoundingly animated bosses make Hexen II "one of the most beautiful games ever made", the actions needed to progress are so obscure that they are comparable to what is required to find optional secret areas in most games, forcing the player to undertake frustrating, exhaustive searches of the game's environments. GamePro praised the high speed of the multiplayer sessions, the selection of character classes, and the high detail present when graphical acceleration is used. They concluded, "For replay value and sheer fun, Hexen II is going to be hard to beat; you could spend days playing through all four characters in single-player mode without even entering multiplayer battles."

According to Erik Bethke, Hexen II was commercially unsuccessful, with sales slightly above 30,000 units.

== Reviews ==
- Backstab #6
