= Big Red Racing =

1996 video game

- Title screen
- Developer: Big Red Software
- Publisher: Domark
- Platform: MS-DOS
- Release: EU: March 1996; NA: March 29, 1996
- Genre: Racing
- Modes: Single-player, multiplayer

Big Red Racing is a racing video game released for MS-DOS in 1996. It was developed by Big Red Software and published by Domark.

== Gameplay ==
Big Red Racing is a comedic racing game. During races, the commentators make humorous comments, stereotypically themed to the country they are from. When menu items are clicked, humorous phrases are played.

U.S.A. "Excellent Adventure" track

There are 24 courses and 6 cups, encompassing the globe, the Moon, Venus, and Mars. Each course has a humorous subtitle, usually a parody of a famous phrase or film.

=== Customisation ===
For the driver, the player can choose from a few different body shapes and change the colour of the clothes. For the vehicle, the player can change the colour and decal.

== Development ==
The game was originally slated for a November 1995 release. It was delayed into 1996 due to various changes and additions by the developers. The later Eurogamer writer Keith Stuart was commissioned to write an expansive backstory for the game, which was to be included in the printed manual. A few months before release, the publisher balked at the cost and cut the manual. Looking back in 2016, Stuart wrote: "They were right. It didn't really add anything, it was indulgent (...) No one will ever care that I spent several weeks writing that nonsense or that now it is gone forever".

== Reception ==
Reception

Review scores
Publication	Score
GameSpot	7.5/10
Next Generation	3/5
Computer Game Review	89/100

GameSpot was positive to the game; although commenting that the title is not a simulation, but an arcade game, they recommended it for arcade fans. A Next Generation critic highly praised the variety of playable vehicles and tracks and the use of real time graphics. He remarked that while the low graphical detail makes the game look chunky, it also enables the game to run just as smoothly with six players as with only one. However, he criticized the single-player mode for the AI's apparent cheating, since there is always one racer just slightly ahead of the player car, and recommended that consumers not buy the game until they've made certain they have someone who will play it with them. Frank Snyder of Computer Game Review offered Big Red Racing a positive score.
