= Singularity (video game) =

2010 video game

- Developer: Raven Software
- Publisher: Activision
- Director: Dan Vondrak
- Writers: Marc Guggenheim; Lindsey Allen; Emily Silver
- Composers: Charlie Clouser; Michael Wandmacher
- Engine: Unreal Engine 3
- Platforms: PlayStation 3 Windows; Xbox 360
- Release: EU: June 25, 2010; NA: June 29, 2010; AU: June 30, 2010
- Genres: First-person shooter, survival horror
- Modes: Single-player, multiplayer

Singularity is a 2010 first-person shooter video game developed by Raven Software and published by Activision and released for Windows, PlayStation 3 and Xbox 360. It is built on the Unreal Engine 3 from Epic Games.

== Gameplay ==
Singularity is a first-person shooter with horror elements. A main gameplay device is an artifact known as the Time Manipulation Device (TMD). The TMD is powered by an E-99 core, and can manipulate time. The TMD can move an object backwards or forwards in time, attract objects and hold them indefinitely, however it only affects living beings or objects that have been in contact with E-99. It is used often to solve puzzles such as aging and de-aging boxes to open gates and in combat by creating energy pulses that can stun or kill enemies.

While the story is mostly linear without any choices that affect the narrative, the ending leaves the player with a choice that just affects the ending cutscene.

The TMD can be used in conjunction with special power stations scattered across the island that greatly amplify its power, allowing it to affect objects much larger than it can normally control such as collapsed bridges or shipwrecks, although this ability is only used during cutscenes.

== Multiplayer ==
There are two multiplayer modes available. Both modes have the players fighting as either the soldiers or creatures, with each side having their own classes and abilities. One mode, simply called "Creatures vs. Soldiers", is a simple team deathmatch style game, while the other mode, called "Extermination", has the soldiers trying to take control of various beacons on the map, with the creatures tasked with defending said beacons to prevent eradication. Once the time runs out, or the soldiers capture all the beacons, the players switch roles.

== Plot ==
The game begins when an electromagnetic surge from an uninhabited island called Katorga-12, once held by the Soviet Union, damages an American spy satellite. A group of U.S. Recon Marines, which includes protagonist Captain Nathaniel Renko, goes to investigate. Another surge disables the unit's helicopter, and it crashlands on Katorga-12. Following the crash, Renko begins to phase between the present and 1955, the date of a catastrophic accident on the island. He arrives in 1955 just in time to save a scientist named Nikolai Demichev from dying in a fire.

Back in the present, Renko discovers that Demichev has taken over the world. He is captured by Demichev's soldiers, but is rescued by Kathryn, a member of a resistance group called Mir-12. Based on a journal the group found on Katorga-12, Mir-12 believes that Renko can put an end to Demichev's reign using the Time Manipulation Device (TMD) developed by Victor Barisov. Barisov was killed by Demichev in the past, so Renko uses the TMD to save Barisov by going back in time and preventing him being shot by Demichev.

They decide to change history by returning to 1955 and blowing up Katorga-12 with an E-99 bomb, the material responsible for the catastrophe in 1955. The bomb is stored inside a big ship named "Pearl". Renko restores the ship using the TMD which is boosted by an electricity platform he stands on and raises it, he then boards the ship and retrieves the bomb while the whole ship is deteriorating even with the restorative power of the TMD. While attempting to retrieve the bomb, Renko barely escapes the sinking ship and Barisov retrieves him while Kathryn goes missing. However it turns out the bomb is not charged and Renko will need to find the E-99 processing facility that can be used to charge it where he once again goes back in time to do so. He will then head to the singularity tower with Barisov to plant the bomb in the past and make sure everything in the island is destroyed and Demichev never completes his research.

But after planting the bomb Renko finds Demichev holding Barisov at gunpoint. Demichev reveals that he rebuilt the facility after it was destroyed, so that history remained unchanged. Barisov realizes that it was Demichev's rescue that changed history, so he asks Renko to go back and stop his past self from saving Demichev. Demichev, in turn offers Renko a place in his empire in exchange for the TMD. He points out that Barisov's plan has failed before – the mysterious man who told Renko not to save Demichev in 1955 was Renko himself.

At this point, the player has a choice. If Renko shoots Demichev, he goes back in time to stop himself from saving Demichev in the first place. In order to do so, he decides to kill his past self. In the epilogue, the game starts again from the very beginning, and Renko is sitting inside the helicopter that is searching the area. However, the mission is soon aborted and declared to be a false alert. They fly past a giant statue of Barisov. It is implied that he recovered the TMD and used it to conquer the world himself. If Renko instead shoots Barisov, he and Demichev rule the world together. After some time, Demichev begins to fear Renko's growing power, and a new cold war develops between the lands ruled by Renko and those ruled by Demichev. If Renko shoots both Demichev and Barisov, Renko allows the world to fall into chaos. Later, he rises up as a new world leader, using the TMD to assert his power.

A post-credits scene shows a wounded Kathryn, pulled into 1955 by a time distortion, writing the Mir-12 journal which will later be used to track down Renko.

== Development ==
Singularity's concept was based on Brian and Steve Raffel's memories of the Cold War era and exploration of old abandoned buildings, including a World War II military base in the vicinity of Madison, Wisconsin. Some aspects of the game, especially the 1950s sections were inspired by pulp sci-fi movies.

According to Keith Fuller from Raven Software the game had a troubled development and was almost cancelled by publisher Activision. The number of development teams at Raven was reduced to one after more layoffs in October 2010, after delays with Singularity; as many as 40 staff were released. Following the layoffs, Raven has been focused on assisting with the Call of Duty series ever since.

== Reception ==
Reception

Aggregate score
Aggregator	Score		
Aggregator	PC	PS3	Xbox 360
Metacritic	76/100	77/100	76/100

Review scores
Publication	Score		
Publication	PC	PS3	Xbox 360
Destructoid	N/A	N/A	9/10
Eurogamer	N/A	N/A	8/10
Game Informer	8.5/10	8.5/10	8.5/10
GamePro	N/A	N/A	4/5
GameRevolution	B	B	B
GameSpot	8/10	8/10	8/10
GameTrailers	N/A	6.9/10	N/A
GameZone	7/10	7/10	7/10
Giant Bomb	N/A	4/5	4/5
IGN	7/10	(US) 7/10 (AU) 6.8/10	(US) 7/10 (AU) 6.8/10
Joystiq	N/A	N/A	3.5/5
Official Xbox Magazine (US)	N/A	N/A	7.5/10
PC Gamer (UK)	68%	N/A	N/A
PlayStation: The Official Magazine	N/A	3/5	N/A
The Daily Telegraph	N/A	N/A	7/10
The Escapist	N/A	N/A	4/5

Singularity received "generally favorable reviews" on all platforms according to the review aggregation website Metacritic. Activision was disappointed with Singularity's sales, which came out under 400,000.

Destructoid praised the Xbox 360 version, stating that "Singularity is a game that manages to feel like its own thing despite being pieced together from previous FPS games, and if you want a great Summer shooter full of violent toys and silly super powers, then you won't get much better than this. Quite possibly the best new FPS of the year so far." IGN was not so enthusiastic, and said that while "the gunplay is solid and there are a few memorable set pieces", the game is "ultimately limited by a lack of imagination where a neat time-manipulation idea is handcuffed to a by-the-numbers first-person shooter". Some reviewers criticized the game for similarities to other games, such as BioShock. In Japan, where the PlayStation 3 and Xbox 360 versions were ported and published by Square Enix on September 22, 2010, Famitsu gave both console versions each a score of 29 out of 40, while Famitsu Xbox 360 gave its Xbox 360 version a score of one eight, one seven, and two eights for a total of 31 out of 40.

The A.V. Club gave the Xbox 360 version a B+ and said that "for a game released to little fanfare, one that's innovative only in an additive sense, Singularity is worth playing for its canny incorporation of the best ideas from the last decade of first-person shooters, and for providing a suitably chilling atmosphere in which to enjoy them." The Escapist similarly gave it four stars out of five and called it "a solid and entertaining effort that you'll probably enjoy more than you think you will." The Daily Telegraph gave it seven out of ten and said of the game, "With its varied combat, ridiculous story and outlandish weapons it's a fun and engaging title and it's a real pity that that Activision haven't given it the attention it deserves. If you're willing to overlook its shortcomings and enjoy old school running-and-gunning, Singularity is an immensely satisfying romp." Metro UK similarly gave it seven out of ten and said it was "A little undercooked, but this is still an enjoyable attempt to create a more cerebral shooter in the vein of BioShock and Half-Life 2." Edge gave the game a score of six out of ten and said, "For all Raven's efforts with temporal gimmicks, this is a game which is stuck in the FPS past – but, perversely, in its gun-metal and gore, in its most archaic respects, Raven proves it can just about stand the test of time."
