= MageSlayer =

1997 video game

- Cover art by Gerald Brom
- Developer: Raven Software
- Publisher: GT Interactive
- Director: Steve Raffel
- Designer: Daniell Freed
- Programmer: Chris Rhinehart
- Artists: Brian Pelletier; Les Dorscheid
- Composers: Chia Chin Lee; Kevin Schilder
- Platform: Microsoft Windows
- Release: NA: September 24, 1997
- Genre: Third-person shooter
- Modes: Single-player, multiplayer

MageSlayer is an action video game released in 1997. It was based on the Vampire engine, developed by Raven Software, along with Take No Prisoners. The engine provides a top-down view with 2D sprites for the character and monsters in a full 3D environment with dynamic and colored lighting. The score was composed by Kevin Schilder. MageSlayer marked another Raven Software collaboration with the fantasy artist Brom, who produced the box cover artwork for the game.

== Plot ==
In a world of fantasy far away, a shower of meteorites called Starfall dominates a time in history. The meteorites lie about everywhere pulsing with radioactive power which the people of the land scramble to exploit. Of the people only three professions had the power to exploit the radioactive stones; Mages, Mageslayers, and Lorethanes. The Mages, in their hungry studies of the meteorites, gained knowledge of the use of the stones and gained terrible power. Consumed by their lust for the power of the stones, they dominated over all.

The five Mageslayer clans were formed to free the people of the lands from the power hungry Mages that had enslaved them. The Mageslayers learned to harvest the power of two very powerful meteorites that fell from the sky. The first, the Sun Orb, was studied and they learned to control powerful magic, without the megalomaniac side effects that the Mages experienced.

The second, the Starstone, was crafted into five powerful Relics. Using these two forces the MageSlayers drove the Mages into retreat. When the Mages fought back, the Clan of Knowledge was sacrificed in order to save the other clans. The Mageslayers were victorious, but it cost them the five Relics crafted from the Starstone and the Clan of Knowledge was destroyed. Each of the clans passed the knowledge of the SunOrb down through the generations. A single leader of each of the clans was selected to guard the most revered of the Clan secrets.

A millennium has passed since the Clan of Knowledge was destroyed in the Mage War. The Lore Thane, Leader of the Clan of Knowledge and descendant of one of the five powerful Mageslayers, seeks revenge for what he sees was a betrayal. Now the Lore Thane is ready to take revenge on the other four Guilds that refused to help him against the Mages which led to his clan's destruction. He's unearthed the five Starstone relics that won the Mage Wars and placed them under the protection of his minions. The four remaining Mageslayer clans have joined forces and sent their leaders to fight their way through the dominions of the Lore Thane's allies in order to recover the relics. Scribes, named Archivists, have foretold a coming conflict with a powerful and evil undead Lore Thane named Wyark, who has been growing in terrible strength with the aim of complete conquest of the world. The archivists have determined that the retrieval of the five special relics will enable the Mageslayer forces of good to defeat the evil Wyark. The players takes on the role of the Mageslayer tasked with retrieving the artifacts and ultimately defeat Wyark.

== Gameplay ==
The game is a 3D top-down hack-and-slash dungeon-type game, utilizing four different character classes with differing spells and abilities. The game offers a single-player campaign and different multiplayer options. The player journeys through 30 levels of dungeons, sewers, rivers of death, lava pits, and monster rooms across five realms in order to defeat each realm's ruler and gain its relic; learning and upgrading magic spells, and acquiring artifacts to help the player succeed the quest. Utilizing the same Vampire engine as Take No Prisoners, MageSlayer was Raven's tribute to top-down action games. The main inspiration for MageSlayer was Atari's game Gauntlet.

== Reception ==
Reception

Review scores
Publication	Score
AllGame	4/5
CNET Gamecenter	8/10
Computer Games Strategy Plus	3.5/5
Computer Gaming World	1.5/5
GameSpot	7.2/10
Génération 4	2/6
Hyper	62%
Next Generation	4/5
PC Gamer (UK)	59%
PC Gamer (US)	79%
PC Zone	73%

Upon release, MageSlayer received "generally positive" reviews by critics. Next Generation concluded, "Overall, the game's action, level design, and multiplayer modes (which include a Capture the Relic team option) make this game stand out from most other shooters on the block. For those players who possess the benefit of 3D acceleration, this title could be quite a nice one to showcase your shiny new hardware."

The game won the award for "Action Coaster" in Computer Gaming World's 1998 Premier Awards.
