= Call of Duty Online =

2012 video game

- Developers: Raven Shanghai; Activision Shanghai Studio
- Publisher: Tencent Games
- Series: Call of Duty
- Engine: IW 4.0
- Platform: Microsoft Windows
- Release: CHN: September 28, 2012
- Genre: First-person shooter
- Mode: Multiplayer

Call of Duty Online (also known as CODOL, CODO, and Call of Duty: Online, Chinese: 使命召唤Online; pinyin: Shǐmìng zhàohuàn Online) was a free, online first-person shooter game developed by Raven Shanghai and Activision Shanghai Studio. Distributed by Tencent Games, the game was originally launched in a beta version in 2012 before officially launching exclusively for China in 2015. It was a free-to-play game, making it the first such title in the Call of Duty video game series. On May 31, 2021, Tencent Games announced the game servers would be shut down on August 31, 2021 and promoted players to instead shift to Call of Duty: Mobile.

== History ==
Following the launch of Call of Duty: Modern Warfare 2, Activision began attempts to sell a Call of Duty game in the Chinese market but struggled with the cost and Chinese distribution laws. However, in 2011, Activision partnered with Tencent to create an exclusive Chinese title for the franchise. During early development and initial beta testing, the game was developed by Activision's Shanghai studio. However, development switched over to Raven Software after the game officially launched in 2015. On August 31, 2021, the game servers were officially shut down by Tencent.

== Overview ==
The free-to-play game featured some of the same multiplayer modes as previous games in the series, but with several notable changes. The game offered "Hero Ops" single-player missions, a cooperative survival mode, as well as a special mode called "Cyborgs", which replaced the franchise's popular zombie-survival mode. This change was brought about by Chinese censorship laws. The game also allowed players to purchase and/or rent cosmetics for their in-game avatars. After its launch, the game released updates that included new weapons and features from recent installments in the larger franchise.
