= ShadowCaster =

1993 video game

- Developer: Raven Software
- Publishers: NA/EU: Origin Systems; JP: Electronic Arts Victor
- Designers: Brian Raffel; Steve Raffel
- Programmers: Steven Coallier; Carl Stika; Kurt Schallitz; Victor Brueggeman
- Artists: Shane Gurno; Brian Pelletier; Scott Rice; James Sumwalt
- Composer: Marc Schaefgen
- Engine: Raven Engine (modified Wolfenstein 3D engine)
- Platforms: MS-DOS, PC-98
- Release: October 28, 1993: MS-DOS floppy 1994: MS-DOS CD; August 26, 1994 PC-98
- Genre: Role-playing
- Mode: Single-player

ShadowCaster is a first-person role-playing video game developed by Raven Software. It was published for MS-DOS in 1993 by Origin Systems after Electronic Arts acquired them. A CD-ROM version was released in 1994, with two additional levels with new monsters, and text boxes replaced by full-motion video and spoken narration through Compact Disc Digital Audio tracks. A PC-98 conversion was also published in 1994.

== Plot ==
In the beginning of the game Kirt finds out that he is not in fact human, but comes from a parallel world where there was a war raging between shapeshifters for centuries. Kirt, and his grandfather, are the last of their kind, and now the evil ones have found them. Kirt's grandfather opens a portal back to the homeworld, and that is where the story begins. Kirt's mission is to stop the demons once and for all, but first he will need to awaken his innate shapeshifting powers, which is where the obelisks come into play. Going up to one of these and touching it will unlock a new form, and the first is the cat form.

== Gameplay ==
The player takes the role of Kirt, a human with powers of shapeshifting. Among other forms, Kirt can become a huge cat-like animal, a floating tentacle-wielding gazer, and a dragon.

=== Forms ===
Kirt – The default character. All abilities are weak, but has some fighting skill and is the only form in which magic rejuvenates. Health also rejuvenates but slower than magic does.

Maorin – The first form the character collects, and the most useful early in the game. Maorin is a large, four-armed, cat-like creature with superior fighting skills and the ability to see things invisible to others. It drowns quickly, however.

Caun – A leprechaun-like creature who is a poor fighter, but can heal quickly, jump over obstacles, fit in smaller spaces and unleash a swarm of insects (needed to unlock a particular door). Also has a shield spell and a light spell, and can magically reach out and take objects which are far away.

Opsis – A hovering brain with tentacles that can use spells effectively, such as fireballs and cold blasts. Moves very slowly in the air.

Kahpa – A decent fighter that can breathe underwater. Has a sonic and an electrical attack. Both are supposed to be extra powerful in water.

Ssair – A hovering dragon with no legs with better attack (but weaker defense) than the Maorin. Can breathe fire, use its tail as a weapon, and fly very fast. Real Ssair, who are normally hostile, will ignore Kirt when he is in this form.

Grost – A man made of stone that is an excellent fighter with strong defense that can also punch through certain walls. Can cause earthquakes and paralyze foes with a touch.

== Development ==
The ShadowCaster game engine, a successor of the Wolfenstein 3D engine and a predecessor of the Doom engine, was written by id Software's John Carmack and licensed to Raven Software. Carmack wrote the ShadowCaster 3D engine during his technology research after id Software completed Wolfenstein 3D. The engine features diminished lighting, texture-mapped floors and ceilings, walls with variable heights and sloped floors. The engine was "about half as fast as that of Wolfenstein" but fit the exploration of ShadowCaster rather than the fast-paced action of Doom.

The game supported the Logitech Cyberman 6DOF controller. It used the vertical axis to control the player's flying height and provided tactile feedback when the player bumped a wall or was hit.

The game engine was also used for In Pursuit of Greed. Raven Software would later create a similar game engine in house for CyClones.

== Reception ==
Reception

Review scores
Publication	Score
PC Format	87%
PC Gamer (UK)	90%
CD-ROM Today	4.5/5
Electronic Entertainment	9 out of 10

Award
Publication	Award
PC Gamer UK	#95, Top 100

Reviewing the game for PC Gamer UK, Gary Whitta remarked that "Underworld fans will lap [ShadowCaster] up — as should anyone thinking of toying with the genre." The magazine later named it the 49th best computer game of all time, calling it "an admirable attempt to show that RPGs don't have to be boring, complex and number-heavy".

Ed Ricketts of PC Format praised ShadowCaster's "bags of atmosphere" and called it "the best role-playing game to appear for a long, long while". In Computer Gaming World, Scorpia wrote: "Those who prefer the regular Ultima style of role-playing will probably want to skip this one. But players looking for pure, no-nonsense hack-n-slash will have a blast." Writing for CD-ROM Today, Trent C. Ward stated that ShadowCaster's "fantastic graphics, sound and storytelling ... completely immerse you in a virtual world both dark and wondrous". He summarized it as "an excellent addition to any gamer's library".

James V. Trunzo reviewed Shadowcaster in White Wolf #44 (June, 1994), giving it a final evaluation of "Very Good" and stated that "Shadowcaster lives and dies on the merits of its shapeshifting concept. Allowing your character to morph into six unique shapes is like having an entire party of characters while managing only one. While Shadowcaster isn't the best adventure game on the market, it's easily the best of its type."

Shadowcaster was a runner-up for Computer Gaming World's Action Game of the Year award in June 1994, losing to Prince of Persia 2: The Shadow and the Flame. It was named the 95th best computer game ever by PC Gamer UK in 1997.
