= Heretic II =

1998 video game

- Cover art by Brom
- Developer: Raven Software: Loki Software (Linux) Hyperion Entertainment (Amiga) MacPlay (Mac)
- Publisher: Activision
- Director: Brian Pelletier
- Producer: Steve Stringer
- Designer: Jon Zuk
- Programmer: Patrick J. Lipo
- Artist: Brian Pelletier
- Composer: Kevin Schilder
- Engine: Quake II engine
- Platforms: Windows, Linux, AmigaOS, Mac OS
- Release: Windows: NA: November 24, 1998; EU: December 4, 1998; Linux: NA: November 15, 1999; Amiga: NA: May 8, 2000; Mac OS: NA: January 1, 2002
- Genres: Action-adventure, third-person shooter
- Modes: Single-player, multiplayer

Heretic II is a 1998 action-adventure game developed by Raven Software and published by Activision for Microsoft Windows. It is the fourth game in the Hexen/Heretic series and comes after the "Serpent Rider" trilogy, continuing the story of Corvus, the protagonist of the original Heretic. Although Id Software owns the publishing rights to the previous titles, Heretic II is owned by Activision since they own Raven Software and its IPs.

Using a modified Quake II engine, the game features a mix of a third-person camera with a first-person shooter's action, making for a new gaming experience at the time. While progressive, this was a controversial design decision among fans of the original game, a well-known first-person shooter built on the Doom engine. The music was composed by Kevin Schilder. Gerald Brom contributed conceptual work to characters and creatures for the game. This is the only Heretic and Hexen video game that is unrelated to id Software, apart from its role as engine licenser.

Heretic II was later ported to Linux by Loki Software, to the Amiga by Hyperion Entertainment, and Macintosh by MacPlay.

== Plot ==
Corvus, the protagonist of the first game, returns from his banishment and finds that a mysterious plague has swept the land of Parthoris, taking the sanity of those it does not kill. He returns to his hometown of Silverspring but is forced to flee after the infected attack him, becoming infected himself in the process. The effects of the disease are held at bay in Corvus’ case because he holds one of the Tomes of Power, but he still must find a cure before he succumbs.

His quest leads him through the city and swamps to a jungle palace, then through a desert canyon and insect hive, followed by a dark network of mines and finally to a castle on a high mountain where he finds an ancient Seraph named Morcalavin. Morcalavin is trying to reach immortality using the seven Tomes of Power, but he uses a false tome, as Corvus has one of them. This has caused Morcalavin to go insane and create the plague. During a battle between Corvus and Morcalavin, Corvus switches the false tome for his real one, curing Morcalavin's insanity and ending the plague.

== Gameplay ==
Unlike previous games in the Heretic/Hexen series, which were first-person shooters, players control Corvus from a camera fixed behind him in the third-person perspective. Players are able to use a combination of both melee and ranged attacks, similar to its predecessor. While there are still three weapons the player can collect that each use their own ammo, they also have the ability to use several offensive and defensive spells that draw from pools of green and blue mana, respectively. The Tome of Power is no longer an item scattered around the levels, but a defensive spell that still works in the same manner as the other games in the series by improving damage and granting weapons and offensive spells new abilities for a limited time. Melee combat is also more varied, with the ability to perform several attacks using Corvus' bladestaff and cut off the limbs of enemies, rendering them harmless. Players are also able to utilize magical shrines throughout the game that grant a variety of effects upon use, such as silver or gold armor, a temporary boost in health, a permanent enhancement to the bladestaff, etc.

The game consists of a wide variety of dark fantasy medieval backdrops to Corvus's adventure. The third-person perspective and three-dimensional game environment allowed developers to introduce a wide variety of gymnastic moves, like climbing up ledges, back-flipping off walls, and pole vaulting, in a much more dynamic environment than the original game's engine could produce. Both games invite comparison with their respective game engine namesake: the original Heretic was built on the Doom engine, and Heretic II was built using the Quake II engine, later known as id Tech 2. Heretic II was favorably received at release because it took a different approach to its design.

== Development ==
The game was in development since November 1997 by a team of 20 people. Inspired by the Tomb Raider series, Raven Software decided to make use of the Quake II engine to create a third-person action game. A major step in the early development was Gerald Brom's concept art. In a month, the company had programmed the game's camera system. After Activision's approval of the game's demo, Raven Software aimed to get the full game finished by Christmas (it would release just prior to that Thanksgiving).

The team considered leaving out the Quake II engine's software renderer, but ultimately decided both to retain it and enhance it to support 16-bit color.

For the animation, the main character Corvus was provided with a backbone for realism and had a total of 1600 frames. Most of the animations were done using Softimage. The static world objects and simplified animations were done with 3D Studio Max. The engine was capable of showing up to 4,000 polygons on screen.

Following ZeniMax Media's acquisition of id Software in 2009, the rights to the series have been split between id and Activision Software; Activision holds the development rights, while id holds the publishing rights. this has been resolved by the 2025 release after both companies were acquired by Microsoft Gaming.

== Reception ==
Reception

Aggregate score
Aggregator	Score
GameRankings	82% (Windows)

Review scores
Publication	Score
Edge	8/10
GameSpot	8.1/10
IGN	7.9/10
Next Generation	3/5

Awards
Publication	Award
Computer Gaming World	1999 Premier Awards
Gamesmania	1998 Award of Excellence
Loonygames	1998 Action game of the year

Despite positive reception from critics, Heretic II was a commercial failure. According to PC Data, its sales in the United States totaled 28,994 units by April 1999. Activision's Steve Felsen blamed this performance on the game's design: he noted that "fans of first-person shooters—the target audience for this game—stayed away due to the third-person perspective".

Next Generation reviewed the PC version of the game, rating it three stars out of five, and stated that "Heretic II has a lot going for it. It easily earns it space on the shelf with the heavy hitters this season, but it also serves as a reminder to all that every aspect of game design needs to be pushed if you want your project to truly stand out".

Edge praised the game for its mixture of platform and shoot 'em up action, saying that Heretic II is different enough to stand out from both first-person and third-person games like id Software's first-person shooters or Core Design's Tomb Raider games. Heretic II was a finalist for Computer Gaming World's 1998 "Best Action" award, which ultimately went to Battlezone. The editors wrote that Heretic II "proved that the Quake II engine could work in a third-person game and that a spell-casting, shirtless elf could actually kick ass".
