= Black Crypt =

1992 video game

- Developer: Raven Software
- Publisher: Electronic Arts
- Producer: Christopher Erhardt
- Designer: Brian Raffel
- Programmers: Ben Gokey; Rick Johnson
- Artists: Brian Raffel; Steve Raffel
- Writer: Brian Raffel
- Composer: Kevin Schilder
- Platform: Amiga
- Release: 1992
- Genre: Role-playing
- Mode: Single-player

Black Crypt is a role-playing video game for the Amiga published by Electronic Arts in 1992. It was Raven Software's debut title. Its 3D realtime style is similar to FTL Games' popular Dungeon Master, where the player leads a party of four heroes through a large dungeon to ultimately confront and defeat a powerful enemy. A version for the Mega Drive was in development, but never released.

== Gameplay ==
The player's party fighting an ogre

The player is given the task of creating four heroes to traverse the twenty-eight levels of the "Tomb of the Four Heroes" and defeat the evil Estoroth Paingiver. Estoroth, a powerful cleric, was banished to a black crypt for committing unspeakable acts. The guilds of Astera believe Estoroth is attempting to unseal his crypt, and send the four heroes to seal him away forever.

Unlike Dungeon Master, Black Crypt does not have pre-generated characters to select as possible heroes. When starting a new game, the player must first create and name their four heroes, then choose their class (fighter, cleric, magic user and druid) and set their starting attributes.

While most games of this type did not include maps of the dungeon (meaning players often mapped them out themselves on paper), the magic user has access to a spell called "Wizard Sight" which automatically maps the heroes movement and can be viewed in-game while the spell is active. Black Crypt also has 'bosses' on several levels, the first of which is actually within twenty spaces of the starting location.

== Development ==
Black Crypt was originally conceived by Brian Raffel and Steve Raffel in the late 1980s as an adventure module for pen-and-paper role-playing games, although work began in April 1990 to eventually turn their idea into a video game. The game's budget was $40,000.

According to a pre-release blurb in The One, Black Crypt consists of 12 interconnected dungeons rendered in 64 colours, and an EA spokesman purported that Electronic Arts "like to think of the game as a dungeon simulator rather than a game".

Black Crypt came on three 880k disks (excluding a game-save disk, used if not installed on a hard drive). The game uses the Amiga Halfbrite mode allowing a user defined palette of thirty-two colours, as well as an additional thirty-two colours which are half the brightness of the chosen palette.

== Reception ==
Reception

Review scores
Publication	Score
The One	92%
Amiga Power	85%
Amiga Joker	83%
Play Time	83%
Aktueller Software Markt	9/12
Power Play	72%

Upon release, Black Crypt was met with "widespread critical acclaim", receiving an 92% from The One and 83% from German reviewer Amiga Joker.

Amiga Power gave the Amiga version of Black Crypt an overall score of 85%, the reviewer begins their review remarking their disdain for RPGs, calling them "escapism for accountants", but expressing that "[Black Crypt] somehow managed to draw me in and keep me there". Amiga Power criticized the game's plot as "boring", and calls Black Crypt "aesthetically unremarkable" and the title sequence "dull" and accompanying music "unsuitable rubbish", and sound effects 'unatmospheric' .Amiga Power furthermore calls it 'unoriginal' and expresses that Black Crypt appears based on Dungeon Master, and states "The variety of monsters is not wide and none of them seem out of the ordinary." Despite these criticisms, Amiga Power's reviewer expresses that they "quickly found myself excusing its flaws, and despite a lack of atmosphere there was a healthy feeling that progress was being made. Not once did I reach the stage where I thought 'Now what?' and that impresses me. ... beneath it all, it's actually a rather absorbing and playable game."

The One gave the Amiga version of Black Crypt an overall score of 92%, initially comparing it to Dungeon Master, but expressing that Black Crypt is a 'unique' RPG which sets itself apart from others, calling it "The state of the art in 3D role-playing games". The One praises Black Crypt's graphics and gameplay, stating that "Black Crypt is easily the best 3D role-playing game available on the Amiga. Aside from cosmetic improvements like smoother animation and superior artwork, it boasts features that are clearly the product of some thought being applied in the planning stages. ... What finally tips the balance in Black Crypt's favour is the delicate line between mental effort and combat and the superb way the plot leads you through the game." The One further praises the sound and controls, expressing that "sound effects in Black Crypt provide the player with often vital clues as to what's going on" and calling the controls 'admirable' and that they're "so intuitive that five minutes into the game you won't even notice [you're using it]".

In a retrospective review of Black Crypt in Black Gate, John ONeill said "While critics raved, Black Crypt was released when the Amiga was already in decline, and was never successful enough to be ported to any other platform. It vanished quickly, both from store shelves and collective memory."
