= CyClones =

1994 video game

- Developer: Raven Software
- Publisher: Strategic Simulations
- Director: Victor Penman
- Designers: Timothy Moore; Eric C. Biessman; Michael Raymond-Judy
- Programmer: Carl Stika
- Artist: James Sumwalt
- Composers: Power of Seven; Kevin Schilder
- Platform: MS-DOS
- Release: November 1994
- Genre: First-person shooter
- Mode: Single-player

CyClones is a first-person shooter video game for MS-DOS developed by Raven Software and published by Strategic Simulations in 1994.

== Gameplay ==
The player controls the "HAVOC unit" in a series of missions given by the Earth government to confront and push back the alien invaders and their clone servants. The gameplay follows the standard first-person shooter formula set by Doom the year before, requiring the player to navigate several levels while fighting enemies and activating switches or seeking keys to gain access to different areas. Several missions have specific objectives that must be met before the player is allowed to continue and instructions on what to do next may be displayed on-screen when the player enters a certain area. The enemies encountered include the CyClones humanoids, as well as several robotic and alien creatures. Some enemies are stationary, such as floor or ceiling turrets, and hazards such as explosive barrels are also included. The player can find medikits and "mech-kits" (which serve as armor) in order to ensure their survivability, as well as acquire several weapons which are either human or alien in origin. Later in the game it is possible to acquire an alien suit which grants access to even more powerful weapons, as well as a jetpack that allows the player to fly around the stage.

A distinguishing aspect of CyClones' gameplay is the aiming system. Unlike Doom and most other first person shooter games of the era, CyClones implemented a mouse aiming system, featuring a movable aiming reticle, and allowed players to look up and down, and to jump. The aiming system allows the player to fire their weapon at whatever position they point at in the screen, allowing for significant more accuracy than what the vertical autoaim system employed by most other shooters allowed for. Also unlike Doom, items are picked up not by walking over them but by clicking on them with the mouse. In addition, it is possible to use the mouse to operate the HUD on the screen, in order to for example use an inventory item, switch to another weapon or access the map screen. This control system is very similar to what was later used by the game System Shock.

== Plot ==
CyClones is set in the closing of the 20th century, when wars and pollution devastated many countries in the world and led to a policy of isolation for many governments. During this period, episodes of mass hysteria became widespread, and reports of increased UFO sightings and abductions abounded. A number of "E.T. Phobics" joined to create the Advanced Ideas Corporation (A.I.). Partially funded by the U.S. military, the corporation began operating in secret laboratories as the millennium came to a close. The corporation was eventually able to discover and examine a downed alien ship, confirming suspicions of alien activity on the planet. Jubilation over the discovery was short-lived, however, as three days later, the aliens attacked. The attack began with surgical strikes against earth's satellite and missile-control centers. A remarkable discovery about the alien invasion was that most of the invaders were cloned from human tissue samples, genetically engineered, and then cybernetically enhanced. These humanoids were then dubbed "CyClones" at the time the aliens attacked, A.I. had begun work a prototype of a weapon it dubbed the "HAVOC Unit". Built by combining human technology and alien technology recovered from the alien ship, the HAVOC project resulted in the production of a cybernetically-enhanced fighter with superior combat capabilities, which the U.S. government intended to use to sabotage the main alien operations and locate the main base of operations for the aliens, in order to destroy their leader and cause enough disarray in the enemy forces to allow for their defeat by conventional armies.

== Development ==
CyClones was developed by studio Raven Software, a company founded in 1988 by Brian and Steve Raffel and made up of ten staff at the time of its creation. Its in-house engine, named STEAM, was one of the first to support the computer mouse as the primary controls in a first-person shooter. 30 minutes of full motion video was filmed for the game's video sequences.

== Reception ==
Reception

Review scores
Publication	Score
Computer Game Review	83%
Computer Gaming World	2.5/5
PC Gamer (US)	81%
PC Zone	78%
Electronic Games	C+

CyClones received average reviews upon release. Praising the game as "superb" and "overlooked", PC Zone retrospectively praised CyClones for its mouse controls, considering this was a "pioneering" and revolutionary concept for the first-person shooter genre. However, the publication felt the full motion video sequences were "slow", "blocky", and "one of the worst ever witnessed" on a computer, and featured an "interface from hell".
