= Take No Prisoners (video game) =

1997 video game

- Developer: Raven Software
- Publisher: Red Orb Entertainment
- Director: Kevin Schilder
- Producer: Steve Schreck
- Designer: Michael Raymond-Judy
- Programmer: Paul MacArthur
- Artist: Brian Pelletier
- Composers: Kevin Schilder; Chia Chin Lee
- Platform: Microsoft Windows
- Release: NA: October 14, 1997; EU: 1997
- Genre: Third-person shooter
- Modes: Single-player, multiplayer

Take No Prisoners is an action video game released in 1997, developed by Raven Software.

== Plot ==
The game is set in San Antonio, Texas, in a post-apocalyptic near-future. The player takes the role of Slade, a mercenary recruited by Martech Industries, Inc. to retrieve a crystal located in the Dome, in the center of the desolated city, which protects those within from the harmful radiation consuming the planet. He must make his way through a chaotic San Antonio and fight military, civilian and security forces combined with irradiated mutants to reach the Dome and retrieve the crystal. This is intended to create a new Dome, and how it is used results in one of two different endings. The end of the game also suggests a sequel, but it was never released.

== Gameplay ==
The game is a top-down shooter with a wide selection of weapons and gadgets to use to solve puzzles and kill enemies. Levels are typically large and sprawling and with multiple points of entry and exit. The city is divided into seven sectors, each one ruled by particular factions, all hostile, with a total of 18 individual levels. Each faction has a critical piece of technology that allows Slade to infiltrate the dome and steal the crystal that powers it. Levels can be moved between by train, truck and boat, and each form of transport begins the next level from a different entry point. Progress is non-linear with the player able to pursue the goal in any order they wish, returning to levels with new weapons and technology. Some areas of levels are only accessible from specific entrances and most levels are designed to be returned to once the player is better equipped. There are a variety of vehicles that the player can use including air boats, hover craft and buggies for traversing the large, sprawling levels.

The story is told in a non-linear style using dropped or downloaded logs that the player can discover in any order. As the story progresses it becomes clear that Slade is not the only person dispatched on his mission and the player encounters other heavily armed mercenaries sent by his employer. Many puzzles in the game are hinted at through the dropped logs. Some levels in the game contain terrain that can be destroyed to allow access to secret areas or shortcuts through the level.

Weapons in the game range from shotguns and assault rifles to high-tech gaussian guns and plasma rifles. Gadgets available include cloaking devices, hover boards and implosion grenades. Some weapons or gadgets are upgradeable. The medkit can be upgraded several times, allowing the player to carry substantially more health and increasing their durability, allowing them to stand up to much more powerful enemies. The medkit automatically heals the player when they would take lethal damage, so it serves as a secondary health pool. At maximum level the player can carry over four thousand health points in their medkit, vastly improving their survivability.

While the overall goal is simply to kill each faction leader and take their respective gadget, getting to that leader is often a puzzle that requires visiting every location in their territory and finding clues for puzzles and equipment to overcome obstacles. Finding the routes between levels is a large part of progressing, as many levels can only be accessed from specific locations and forms of transport. The game encourages players to keep their own notes as there is no direct map of transport routes available, so learning the route to specific locations is very important.

Once the player has explored the whole zone and acquired all the critical gadgets, they must infiltrate the dome, kill its guardian and steal the dome crystal, which requires use of all seven stolen technologies.

== Development ==
Take No Prisoners was Raven Software's first game to not use a first-person perspective. Producer Steve Schreck explained, "We all love playing first-person games. But the great thing about a top-down perspective is the ability to convey a realistic sense of people surrounding you or converging upon you, and that's really what this game is about."

== Reception ==
GamePro gave Take No Prisoners credit for "a deep story line and tons of keyboard commands, tasks to accomplish, and areas to explore", but opined that the game world is frustrating and tedious to navigate due to its complexity, unappealing graphics, and "chintzy sound". The reviewer also contended that "overhead angles for action games simply don't work". GameSpot instead considered the overhead perspective "a breath of fresh air" among the deluge of first-person action games coming out at the time. They praised the presentation of the story through found log entries, the engaging puzzles, and the moody graphics, and remarked that while the game had its share of flaws, such as sluggish net play and a lack of wit in the player character's one-liners, it was overall different enough to be worth getting. They gave it a 7 out of 10.
