= Raven Software =

American video game development company

Raven Software Corporation
- Logo used since 2017

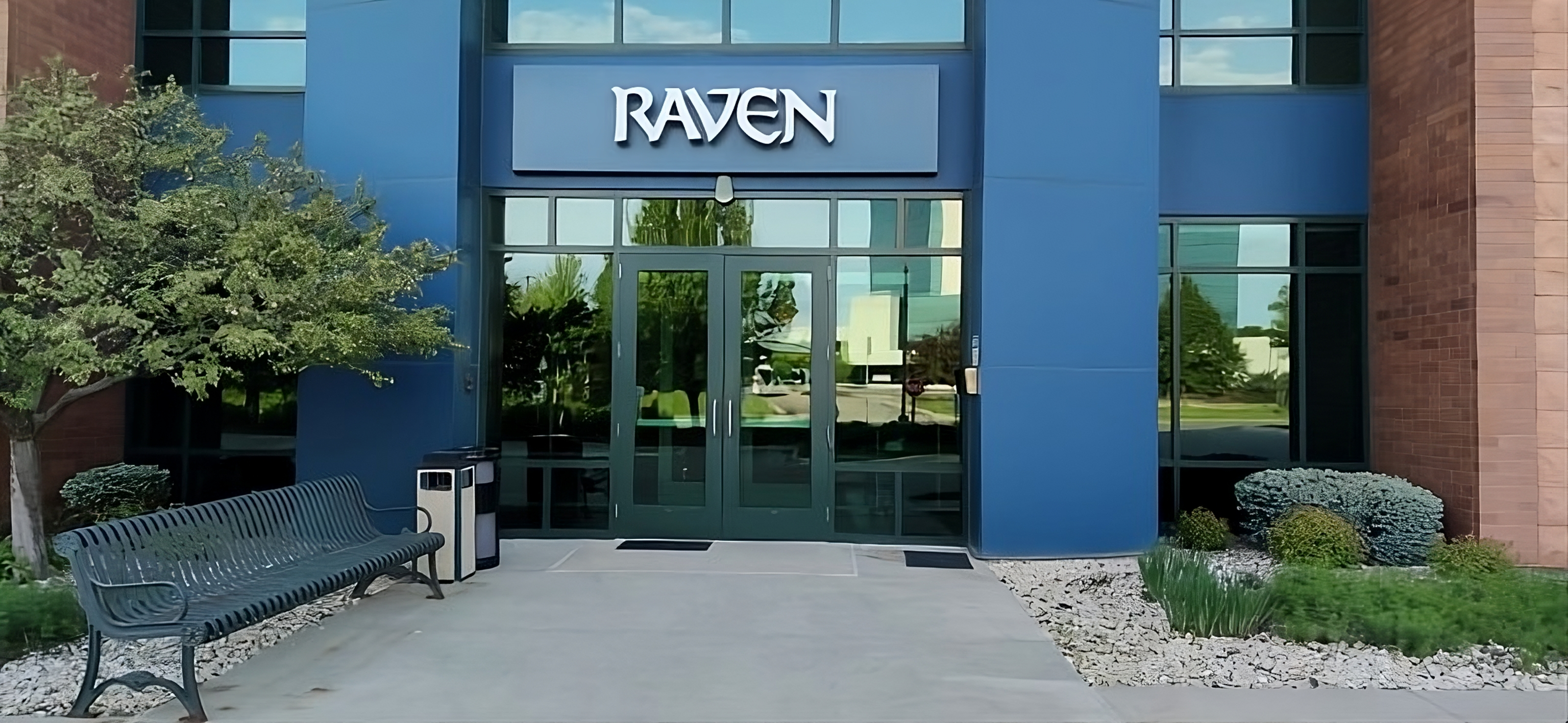
- Headquarters at Greenway Station Center
- Trade name: Raven
- Formerly: Raven Software, Inc. (1990–1997)
- Type: Subsidiary
- Industry: Video games
- Founded: May 23, 1990; 36 years ago in Madison, Wisconsin, US
- Founder: Brian Raffel; Steve Raffel
- Headquarters: 8496 Greenway Blvd, Middleton, Wisconsin, US
- Key people: David Pellas (studio head)
- Products: Heretic/Hexen series (1994–1998); Soldier of Fortune series (2000–2002); Jedi Knight series (2002–2003); X-Men series (2004–2009); Marvel: Ultimate Alliance (2006); Call of Duty series (2011–present)
- Number of employees: 350 (2022)
- Parent: Activision (1997–present)
- Website: ravensoftware.com

Raven Software Corporation (trade name: Raven; formerly Raven Software, Inc.) is an American video game developer based in Middleton, Wisconsin, and part of Activision. Founded in May 1990 by brothers Brian and Steve Raffel, the company is most known for the dark fantasy franchise Heretic/Hexen, the first two Soldier of Fortune games, as well as licensed titles based in the Star Wars: Jedi Knight series and Marvel Comics's X-Men characters, including 2006's Marvel: Ultimate Alliance. Since 2011, Raven has been working on multiple Call of Duty games as both lead and support developer.

Raven's first game, Black Crypt (1992), was conceived in the late 1980s by Raffel brothers to be a paper-and-pen role-playing game, until the two retooled the project from scratch to become a video game. While it did not perform well commercially, its positive reception by critics and technology efforts led to John Romero approaching Raven to develop new titles for the personal computer starting with ShadowCaster (1993), which was powered by Raven Engine, a modified Wolfenstein 3D engine designed by John Carmack. The game's success impressed id Software and Strategic Simulations, who signed a deal to publish the company's next titles, which had grown to two teams to work on 1994's CyClones and Heretic. The latter, inspired by Brian Raffel's interest in making a Dungeons & Dragons–inspired game, was critically acclaimed, spawned several sequels, and helped Raven grow to three development teams.

In August 1997, Activision announced it had agreed to acquire Raven and took over the distribution of Hexen II, while the other two Raven teams continued production on the previously announced titles Take No Prisoners and MageSlayer. After 1998's Heretic II, Raven aimed to expand its games to a broader audience, acquiring Soldier of Fortune magazine name rights to develop a game of the same name while also working on its first licensed title, Star Trek: Voyager – Elite Force. The latter achieved universal acclaim by critics and has since gained a cult following, encouraging LucasArts to collaborate with Raven on Star Wars Jedi Knight II: Jedi Outcast and Star Wars Jedi Knight: Jedi Academy. The company also continued partnering with id Software, working on Quake 4 and the 2009 Wolfenstein, and became one of the first studios to license id Tech 4.

In the 2000s, Raven worked with Marvel Entertainment on some of its superhero properties, developing X-Men Legends (2004), X-Men Legends II: Rise of Apocalypse (2005), Marvel: Ultimate Alliance (2006) and X-Men Origins: Wolverine (2009). This lasted until Raven announced a new intellectual property, Singularity, which was released in 2010 to positive reception. In 2011, Raven shifted to work on several Call of Duty titles as a support developer, and in 2014, the company opened a Chinese studio in Shanghai to collaborate with Tencent Games on Call of Duty Online, although this studio is no longer active today. Raven worked with Infinity Ward and Treyarch on 2020's Call of Duty: Warzone and Call of Duty: Black Ops Cold War, leading production on the latter's single-player campaign. It also developed Call of Duty: Black Ops 6, which was released on October 24, 2024, and Call of Duty: Black Ops 7, which was released on November 14, 2025.

== History ==
=== Foundation and Black Crypt (1986–1992) ===
In 1986, Brian Raffel was an art teacher at University of Wisconsin–Madison and cross country-track coach at Middleton High School and his brother, Steve, worked in a screen-print shop. Their late father, Don, was an influence on the two growing up playing Dungeons & Dragons adventure modules such as Palace of the Silver Princess, Tomb of Horrors, Lost Tomb of Martek, and Castle Amber, who inspired Brian to draw a concept by the end of 1988 called The Well — a paper-and-pen role-playing game originally conceived as a D&D module until Steve came up and reworked it with Brian to be its own thing.

After seeing some of the recent games released to the Amiga, Brian decided that their art was "as good as and in some cases better" than what was coming and chose to move The Well to the Amiga for taking advantage of its computing power. Brian brothers retooled the project from scratch while opening their own company to work on the now-called Black Crypt. Raven Software was officially incorporated on May 23, 1990.

Shortly after establishing Raven, Brian got together with programmers Rick Johnson and Ben Gokey, and musician Kevin Schilder to join the company. Johnson was the youngest crew member at 18 years old. Black Crypt production started in April 1990 and lasted nearly two years, with Raffel brothers and the team moving to a $200 per month office, which sat under a workshop in Madison. The game's budget was $40,000. Described as an "Age of Darkness first-person tile-based real-time combat dungeon simulator", Black Crypt draws inspirations from FTL Games' Dungeon Master 3D realtime style and consists of twelve interconnected dungeons rendered in 64-colour extra half-brite graphics, which allowed players to define a palette customization of sixty-four colours—unlike Dungeon Master and its clones.

=== id Software ===
Raven Software was founded in 1990 by brothers Brian and Steve Raffel. Originally a three-person company, it was discovered by John Romero, co-founder of id Software, who collaborated with Raven to make games using its game engine beginning with ShadowCaster. Raven then started making games with id Software; the company even briefly moved to the same street as id Software. They used id's engines for many of its games, such as Heretic, Hexen: Beyond Heretic and Hexen II.

In 2005 and 2009, Raven developed two games from id's catalog: Quake 4 and Wolfenstein respectively.

=== Activision ===
The company was independent until 1997, when it was acquired by Activision for $12 million. They were still collaborating with id Software but at the same time developed other titles as well such as Soldier of Fortune in 2000, Star Wars Jedi Knight: Jedi Academy in 2003, X-Men Legends in 2004 and many more.

In August 2009, following poor performance and a possible over-budget of Wolfenstein, the company made a major layoff of 30 to 35 staff, leaving two development teams. This was reduced to one after more layoffs in October 2010, after delays with Singularity; as many as 40 staff were released. Following the layoffs and after id Software was bought over by ZeniMax Media, Raven has since become a primary developer for the Call of Duty series. By July 2021, Raven Software had grown to roughly 350 employees.

In December 2021, Activision did not renew the contract of several members of the quality assurance (QA) department that were contract employees. One of the associate managers said that "valuable members" were fired although they "were promised, for months, that Activision was working towards a pay restructure to increase their wages". Following these firings as well as other controversies involving Activision Blizzard, a strike was initiated. On January 21, 2022, Raven's QA team formed a union named the Game Workers Alliance with Communications Workers of America.

In May 2022, workers of the Raven QA team voted to unionize with a count of 19 – 2 in favor. In June 2022 Activision Blizzard CEO Bobby Kotick stated that the company would recognize the union and begin negotiations with it. Following the Raven QA team's successful unionization, the 20-member QA team of Blizzard Albany announced a unionization drive in July 2022 as GWA Albany. The vote passed (14–0), forming the second union at an Activision Blizzard subsidiary.

On March 8, 2024, 600 QA testers at three Activision studios in Austin, Texas, Eden Prairie, Minnesota and El Segundo, California joined Raven and Blizzard's unionizations to form the union "Activision Quality Assurance United-CWA" and voted to unionize (390–8) in favor, making it the largest video game union in the United States. Following Microsoft acquisition of Activision Blizzard, which included Raven Software, the company voluntarily recognized the union.

In April 2026, Brian Raffel retired from Raven Software after more than 36 years with the studio, having served as its vice president since its founding and as studio head since 1997, a role he shared with David Pellas from 2024.

== Games ==
=== Heretic/Hexen (1994–1998) ===
Heretic (also referred to as Hexen) is a series of first-person shooter games with action-adventure and action role-playing elements. The first game, Heretic (1994), was one of the first games to feature inventory manipulation and the ability to look up and down. It also introduced multiple gib objects that spawned when a character suffered a death by extreme force or heat. The game was the first in the "Serpent Riders" trilogy, followed by sequels Hexen: Beyond Heretic (1995) and Hexen II (1997). A direct sequel to the first game, Heretic II, was released in 1998. Set in "City of the Damned", capital city of the dark fantasy fictional world of Silverspring, the series was one of the first to combine 3D realistic graphics with a fantasy setting, using Silverspring and its people to enrich the narrative and exploration.

In 2025, Bethesda Softworks re-released Heretic and Hexen in a bundle called Heretic + Hexen. It was developed by Id Software and Nightdive Studios in association with Activision and Raven Software.

=== Soldier of Fortune (2000–2002) ===
Raven is the creator of Soldier of Fortune, a military first-person shooter series based in the magazine of the same name. The first game, Soldier of Fortune (2000), introduced GHOUL, an in-house physics engine designed by Raven that helped the game's realistic graphic depictions of firearms dismembering the human body. This graphic violence is the main stylistic attraction, enabling depiction of extreme graphic violence, in which character models are based on body parts that can each independently sustain damage (gore zones). Players play as John Mullins in the first game and Soldier of Fortune II: Double Helix (2002). The series continued after Raven ceased developing further games. Soldier of Fortune: Payback (2007) was developed by Cauldron HQ, while Soldier of Fortune Online, an MMOFPS, was developed by South Korean company Dragonfly and released in 2010.

=== Star Wars: Jedi Knight (2002–2003) ===
Star Wars: Jedi Knight is a series of first- and third-person shooter games with action-adventure hack and slash elements. Originally created and developed by LucasArts, Jedi Knight was passed to Raven after numerous restructures at LucasArts in the 2000s led by then president Simon Jeffery. The series is set years after Return of the Jedi and focuses on Kyle Katarn, a former Imperial officer who becomes a mercenary working for the Rebel Alliance, and later a Jedi and instructor at Luke Skywalker's Jedi Academy. Raven produced Katarn's storyline sequels Star Wars Jedi Knight II: Jedi Outcast (2002) and Star Wars Jedi Knight: Jedi Academy (2003).

On April 3, 2013, following the closure of LucasArts, Raven Software released the source code for Star Wars Jedi Knight II: Jedi Outcast and Star Wars Jedi Knight: Jedi Academy on SourceForge under the GPL-2.0-only license.

=== Call of Duty (2011–present) ===
In 2012, Raven began hiring employees for a game, and was announced as collaborating with Infinity Ward on Call of Duty: Ghosts in May 2013.

In April 2014, the company became the lead developer of the now-shutdown free-to-play Chinese Call of Duty title, Call of Duty: Online. The company also remade Call of Duty 4: Modern Warfare, titled Call of Duty: Modern Warfare Remastered.

In 2020, Raven Software collaborated with Infinity Ward on the game Call of Duty: Warzone. The company is considered the face of maintaining, updating, and debugging the game as it regularly provides status updates and patch notes on Twitter and its official website (though it is unclear if it is the sole studio responsible behind-the-scenes).

Raven Software has co-developed three Call of Duty entries with Treyarch. These are Call of Duty: Black Ops Cold War (2020), Call of Duty: Black Ops 6 (2024), and Call of Duty: Black Ops 7 (2025).

== Development philosophy ==
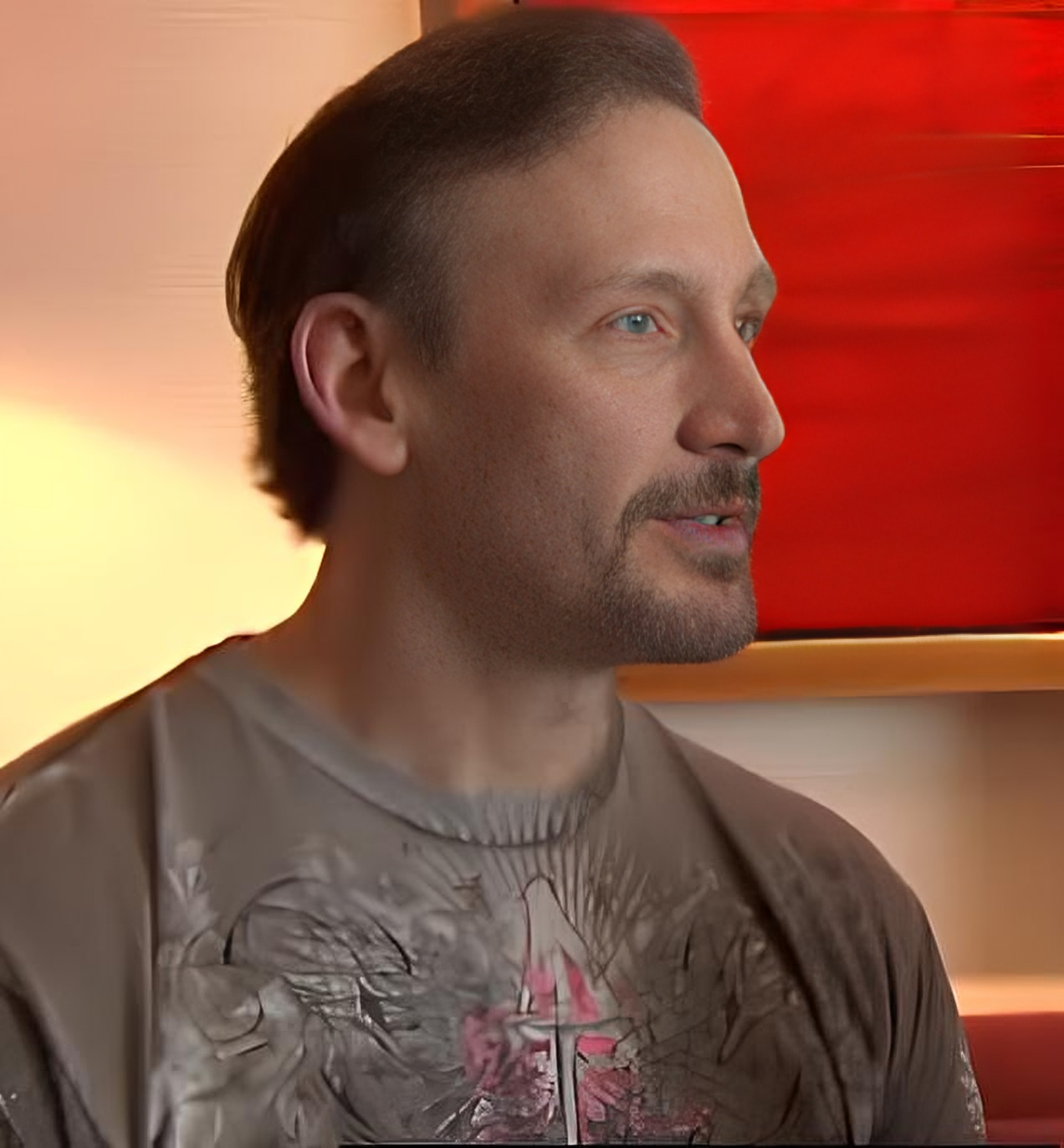
Co-founder Brian Raffel at D.I.C.E. Summit 2009

Raven is known for its approach to multi-project development teams and choice to use project leads and "state-of-the-art tools" that can help incubate ideas before they evolve into production. Eric Biessman, Raven's project director, said: "It's very laid back here. We're left alone to be as creative as we can be". The work culture at Raven is focused in their mentality of team-driven initiatives, extensive playtests, emergent narrative-focused gameplay and less middle-management involvement. Brian Raffel ascribes the company's motto as "move or die", explaining that different directions and creative opportunities are a key element in game design to help Raven determinate which market and public its games are visioning. The studio's vice-president Steve Raffel also head Raven Scout Team (RST), a research group within the company who spend time with analysis, planning and creating vertical slices-based methods to be purposeful improved in company's future projects.

== Accolades and recognition ==
Raven was listed in 2016 by Fortune as the 77th best place to work, and the 66th best in 2017, both as part of Activision Blizzard studios. Raven co-founder Brian Raffel was inducted on In Business Hall of Fame "for his visionary leadership and unparalled passion in game's industry, shaping a successful company and inspiring countless individuals within the gaming community, helping create a close-knit and collaborative culture among teams that marked him as a true icon".
