= Ralcorp =

Manufacturer of various food products

Ralcorp Holdings, Inc.
- Native name: TreeHouse Private Brands, Inc.
- Company type: Subsidiary of Post Holdings
- Industry: Food production
- Founded: 1994; 32 years ago in St. Louis, Missouri (spun off from Ralston Purina)
- Headquarters: Bank of America Plaza; St. Louis, Missouri, United States
- Key people: Richard Koulouris (VP and President)
- Products: Private brand foods sold under the individual labels of various grocery, mass merchandise and drugstore retailers, and frozen bakery products sold to in-store bakeries, restaurants and other foodservice customers
- Website: www.ralcorp.com

Ralcorp Holdings is an American manufacturer of various food products, including breakfast cereal, cookies, crackers, chocolate, snack foods, mayonnaise, pasta, and peanut butter. The company is based in St. Louis, Missouri. The majority of the items Ralcorp makes are private-label, store-brand products. It has over 9,000 employees. Ralcorp has its headquarters in the Bank of America Plaza in downtown St. Louis.

== History and description ==
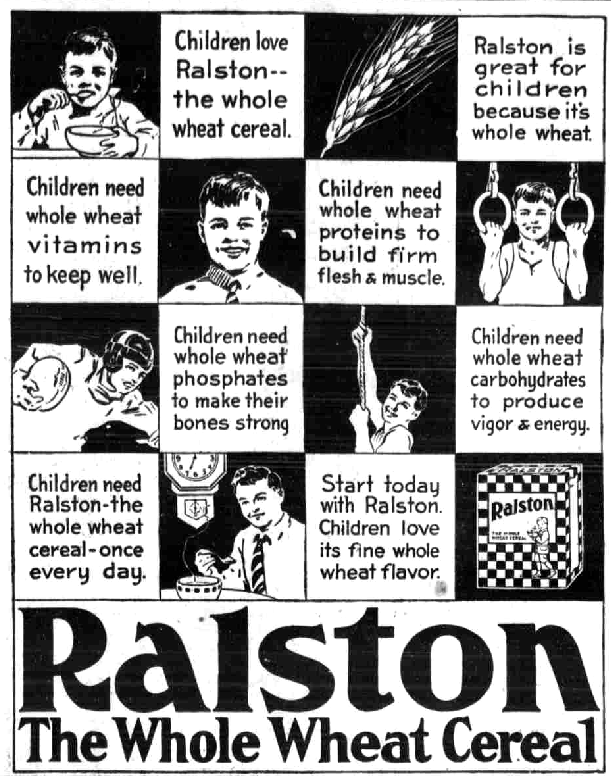
A 1922 newspaper advertisement for Ralston Whole Wheat cereal

Originally part of Ralston Purina, the Ralston name was more associated with food for humans; soda crackers and a farina cereal, among other products, were marketed under this name. Ralcorp can trace its ancestry to 1898 when William H. Danforth of Purina Mills, which made animal feeds, began making breakfast cereal. He sought and received the endorsement of Webster Edgerly (Dr. Ralston) who founded the Ralstonism social movement. Ralston cereal became so successful that Purina Mills was renamed Ralston Purina in 1902. Ralston Purina also for many years produced the familiar line of Chex and Cookie Crisp cold breakfast cereals. The animal and human food businesses were seemingly only tenuously related. In 1994, the human food business was spun off to Ralcorp Holdings, operating as Ralston Foods, which then sold its branded breakfast cereal lineup to General Mills and its Continental Baking division (Wonder Bread and Twinkies) to Interstate Bakeries. The Purina part of the company is now split. The pet-food company sold to Nestlé is now called Nestlé Purina PetCare. The livestock-feed company is called Purina Mills, LLC, and is a unit of Land O'Lakes. Ralcorp manufactures many store-brand foods that are sold in grocery outlets across the United States under the retailers' private labels. In late 2007, Ralcorp signed an agreement with Kraft Foods to acquire the Post Cereals brands, thus returning to the major-branded cereal business. The acquisition was completed August 4, 2008. Another brand name product Ralcorp makes and markets is Ry-Krisp crisp bread.

=== Purchase by ConAgra ===
In 2011, Ralcorp received an offer for the company from ConAgra Foods. Ralcorp resisted the attempt. Ralcorp also announced it was spinning off its Post Foods unit. The spinoff was completed in 2012. On November 27, 2012, ConAgra officials announced they were purchasing Ralcorp, pending Ralcorp shareholder approval, for about $4.95 billion. Stockholders of Ralcorp Holdings Inc. would receive $90 per share. The acquisition was completed in January 2013. The acquisition made ConAgra the largest private-label packaged food business in the United States at that time.

=== Purchase by TreeHouse Foods, Inc ===
On February 1, 2016, TreeHouse Foods announced that it completed the acquisition of ConAgra Foods' private brands operations. "TreeHouse paid $2.7 billion in cash plus transaction expenses for the business and financed the transaction through the closing of its previously announced offerings of $775 million in aggregate principal senior notes due 2024 with a 6.0% annual interest rate and common stock issuance of 13.3 million shares at a price of $65 per share (which includes the exercise, in full, of the overallotment option), aggregating $862.5 million in gross proceeds. The remainder of the purchase price was financed under the Company's revolving credit facility." The rumor of the deal broke in October 2015. According to a FoodProcessing.com article from 10/23/2015:"TreeHouse Foods is rumored to be in advanced talks to purchase the Ralcorp business from ConAgra Foods in a deal valued at $2.5- to $2.7 billion, according to a report from Reuters." This was a huge loss from the $5.1 Billion ConAgra paid for Ralcorp two years earlier.

=== Purchase by Post Holdings ===
On June 1, 2021, Post Holdings announced it acquired the ready-to-eat ("RTE") cereal business of TreeHouse Foods.

== Subsidiaries ==
- American Italian Pasta Company (acquired 2010)
- Ralcorp Frozen Bakery Products
  - Bakery Chef (acquired 2003)
  - Cottage Bakery (acquired 2006)
  - Earl of Sandwich frozen breads
  - Krusteaz frozen products (acquired from Continental Mills in 1999 by Bakery Chef)
  - Lofthouse Foods (acquired 2002)
  - Panne Provincio
- Ralcorp Snacks, Sauces and Spreads
  - Bremner Food Group (acquired 1978)
  - Carriage House Companies (formed 2000)
- Ralston Foods
  - Bloomfield Bakers/Lovin Oven LLC (acquired 2009)

== See also ==
- List of food companies
