= Puppy chow =

Puppy chow may mean many things:

- Puppy Chow, a brand of dog food marketed by Nestlé Purina PetCare
- Food suitable for puppies (see puppy nutrition and dog food)
- Puppy chow (snack), a sweet snack for human consumption
