= Purina Mills =

American animal food company

Purina Mills, LLC
- Trade name: Purina Animal Nutrition, LLC
- Company type: Subsidiary
- Industry: Animal feeds
- Founded: January 8, 1894; 132 years ago in St. Louis, Missouri, USA
- Headquarters: 100 Danforth Drive, Gray Summit, Missouri, U.S.
- Area served: United States
- Key people: William H. Danforth, Founder
- Products: Livestock food; Animal health products
- Parent: Ralston Purina (1894–1986); BP; (1986–1993); Sterling Group of Houston (1993–1998); Koch Industries (1998–2001); Land O'Lakes (2001–present)
- Website: purinamills.com

Purina Mills, LLC is the farm animal feeds unit of Land O' Lakes. It was previously part of Ralston Purina, until the U.S. animal feeds portion was first sold in 1986.

== History ==
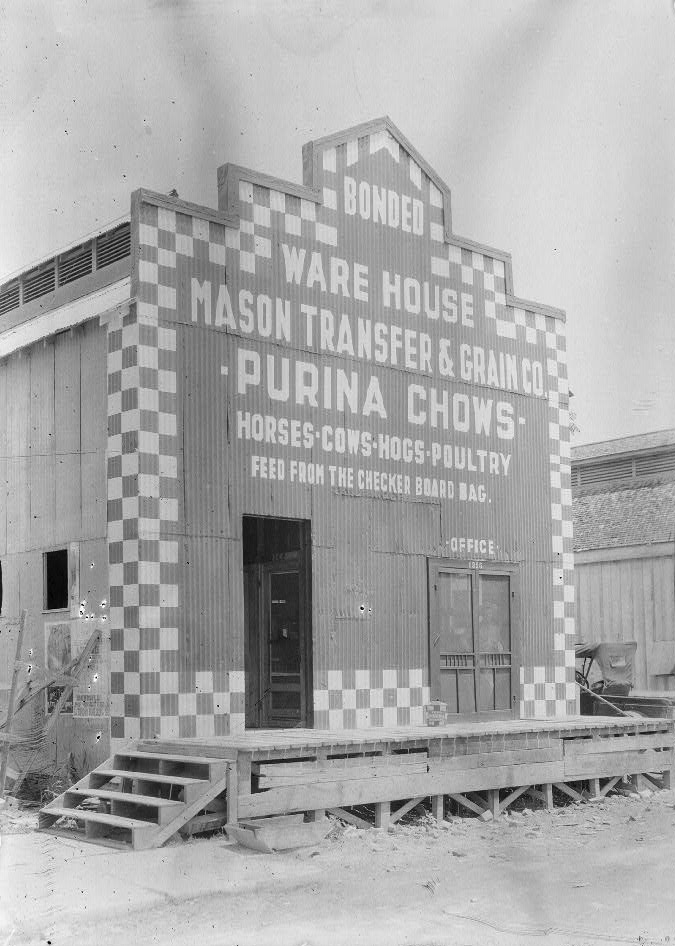
Mason Transfer and Grain Co., bonded warehouse on the south Texas border, storing "Purina Chows" and bearing the Purina checkerboard markings. Taken by Robert Runyon c. 1900-1920

Purina traces its roots back to 1894, when founder William H. Danforth began producing feed for various farm animals under the name Purina Mills. The predominant brand for each animal was generally referred to as "Chow"; hence there was "Purina Horse Chow", "Purina Dog Chow", "Purina Cat Chow", "Purina Rabbit Chow", "Purina Pig Chow", and even "Purina Monkey Chow". Later, in 1902, he merged with university professor Webster Edgerly, founder of Ralstonism, who was at the time producing breakfast cereals, to form the "Ralston Purina Company".

Ralston Purina sold Purina Mills, the U.S. animal feed business, to BP in 1986, while retaining the pet food and international animal feed businesses. In 1993, the Sterling Group of Houston led a leveraged buyout of Purina Mills. In 1998, it was purchased by Koch Industries, but a U.S. bankruptcy court cancelled out all equity held by Koch to maintain the company's viability. Purina Mills filed for Chapter 11 bankruptcy protection in 1999, and was purchased by Land O'Lakes in 2001.

== Licensing rights ==
Purina Mills licenses the Purina and Chow brands for the United States and its territories (including Puerto Rico) from the successor of the Ralston Purina Company and owner of the trademarks, Nestlé Purina PetCare.

Outside of the U.S., the rights to the Purina and Chow brands for animal feeds are licensed to Cargill by Nestle Purina PetCare.

== Logo ==
Ralston Purina was famed for its "checkerboard" trademark. The inspiration for the Ralston Purina logo came from founder William Danforth's childhood memory of a family that dressed in clothing made from checkerboard cloth. The checkerboard trademark, intended to make their burlap bags of feed stand out from competitors, was introduced in 1904. Ralston Purina's headquarters was called Checkerboard Square. At one point, Ralston Purina owned an interest in the St. Louis Blues National Hockey League team; during this period, the arena they then used was referred to as the "Checkerdome".

The checkerboard logo then evolved into a personal development concept Danforth put forth in his book I Dare You, in which he proposed that four key components in life ("Physical," "Mental," "Social," and "Religious") need to be in balance, and one area was not to develop at expense of the other. The concept became intertwined with the company in 1921, when it began selling feed that was pressed in cubes called "checkers".
