= Danforth Chapels =

The Danforth Chapel Program was funded by the Danforth Foundation, an organization created in 1927 by William H. Danforth, founder of the Ralston Purina Company, and his wife. The Danforth Foundation focused on national education philanthropy: providing scholarships to college students, supporting projects to revitalize the city of St. Louis, and funding the Danforth Chapels. The Danforth Foundation closed in 2011 with a gift of $70M to the Donald Danforth Plant Center, a research center that focuses on solving world hunger.

The Danforth Chapel Program supported the establishment of 24 chapels: 15 chapels on college and university campuses and nine other chapels. The chapels and the chapel program emphasized Christian faith in chapel designs but designs and chapels did accommodate for other faiths.

The foundation's first requirement was that each chapel include religious (predominantly Christian) images, such as Heinrich Hoffman's Christ in the Garden. The second requirement was that each include a plaque with an inscription:

Dedicated to the worship of God with the prayer that here in the communion with the highest those who enter may acquire the spiritual power to aspire nobly, adventure daringly, serve humbly.

The third requirement was that the Danforths have a say in the design of each chapel. Most of the Christian iconography in the chapels has been removed to ensure that the spaces are not religiously specific and to welcome groups of other faiths to use the chapel spaces.

== 24 Danforth All-Faith Chapels ==
Each chapel has its own architect, history, location, and story. Three chapels (at North Carolina State University, Mary Institute and St. Louis Country Day School, and Wartburg College) have been demolished to make room for other buildings.

William Danforth's vision statement—"Aspire Nobly • Adventure Daringly • Serve Humbly"—is engraved on a plaque in each of the Danforth Chapels.

An article from the dedication of the Danforth Chapel at the University of Chattanooga states that a chapel was being built in South America, but the Danforth archives reflect chapels in the U.S. with one in Japan and one in India. (Lists of the chapel locations are incomplete; research also reflects a Danforth Chapel at The University of Southern Mississippi, but sources of information are limited.) Several sources state that the Danforth Foundation funded 24 chapels.

Each of the 24 chapels are introduced below.

=== Camp Miniwanca Danforth Chapel (1941) ===
William Danforth was one of four progressive leaders who founded the American Youth Foundation and established the first of its two camps—Camp Miniwanca—in Shelby, Michigan. (Danforth's influence is evident in the American Youth Foundation's logo, similar to that of the Ralston Purina Corporation, and the vision statement—"Aspire Nobly • Adventure Daringly • Serve Humbly"—is iterated in the Miniwanca archives of the original founders' newsletters to campers, The Founders-Four Folder.) These founders focused on a Christian perspective but the youth foundation has shifted to accept a variety of faiths.

The Danforth Chapel at Camp Miniwanca was started in 1936 and completed 1941. The chapel is a small meditation chapel of stone built on a wooded dune near the camp's Church of the Dunes. The founder of the American Youth Foundation describes the chapel in a published manual:

Come with me to the little stone Chapel that stands on the dune-side at Miniwanca

—Ruggedly plain, masoned of stone from nearby fields, harmoniously it blends with the soft foliage of surrounding woods;

—Arched doors and windows, and a tower d [sic] roof add grace and beauty to its symmetric lines;

—Roof beams, hand hewn, plain seats of oak, and rough tiled floor give strength and dignity within;

—On raised altar, plain built and strong, there stands The Cross, illumed by candle flame on right and left;

—And just above, a dossal of blood red hue, to bring relief to wide expanse of solid wall;

—In tiny northex hands the Gethsemane portrait of Him whose name youth enters here to meditate and pray....

The Danforth Chapel is reported to be the final resting place for Mr. William H. Danforth and Mrs. Adda B. Danforth; their ashes rest in a crypt in the chancel of the small Miniwanca Danforth Chapel.

=== Berea College Danforth Chapel (1938) ===
Berea College, located in Berea, Kentucky, is home to the second Danforth Chapel, built in 1938. This Gothic-style building was intended to demonstrate the relationship between spirituality and education.

The Berea Danforth Chapel was designed by architects James P. Jamieson, George Spearl, and Charles Cellarius. The chapel's walls contain 54 stones from various spiritual and international landmarks and leaders, all gifted to Danforth. The stones represent victories throughout the world and include stones from Abraham Lincoln's Tomb in Springfield, Illinois; Washington Monument in Washington, DC; the palace of King Sargon II in Khorsabad, Iraq; Omi, Japan; Canterbury Cathedral in Scotland; the Old Wall in South Korea (Fortress Wall of Seoul); the Roman Forum in Italy; Nazareth, Israel (from the vicinity of Christ's carpenter shop); India from Mahatma Gandhi; Liddar Valley in Kashmir, India; marble from North Korea; and Mount Danforth in Antarctica.

The chapel, a part of the Berea Campus Christian Center, serves as a place for meditation, weddings, memorial services, and small concerts.

=== Pilgrim Danforth Chapel (1941) ===
The Danforth Chapel at Pilgrim Congregational Church United Church of Christ in St. Louis, Missouri, is built adjacent to the main sanctuary. William Danforth and his family were church members at Pilgrim Congregational Church.

=== University of Kansas Danforth Chapel (1946) ===
University of Kansas in Lawrence, Kansas, is home to a Danforth Chapel that was completed and dedicated in 1946. The chapel, which seats 90, is maintained by an endowment fund through the university but was originally funded by a $5000 donation from the Danforth Foundation and was funded and furnished through donations from faculty students, faculty, and residents of the city of Lawrence.

The chapel was designed by Edward W. Tanner (the first architectural engineer graduating from University of Kansas) and J. C. Nichols Co. and built partly by German prisoners of war (POW) who were masons being detained in a POW camp near Lawrence. The chapel was expanded and renovated with a $850,000 addition in fall 2007; the renovation included restorations, new tile, paint, and an organ.

The Danforth Chapel continues to be a place for meditation, small services, and weddings. With 14 other historic buildings in the East Historic District of University of Kansas, the Danforth Chapel has been registered in the National Register of Historic Places.

=== Arizona State University Danforth Chapel (1948) ===
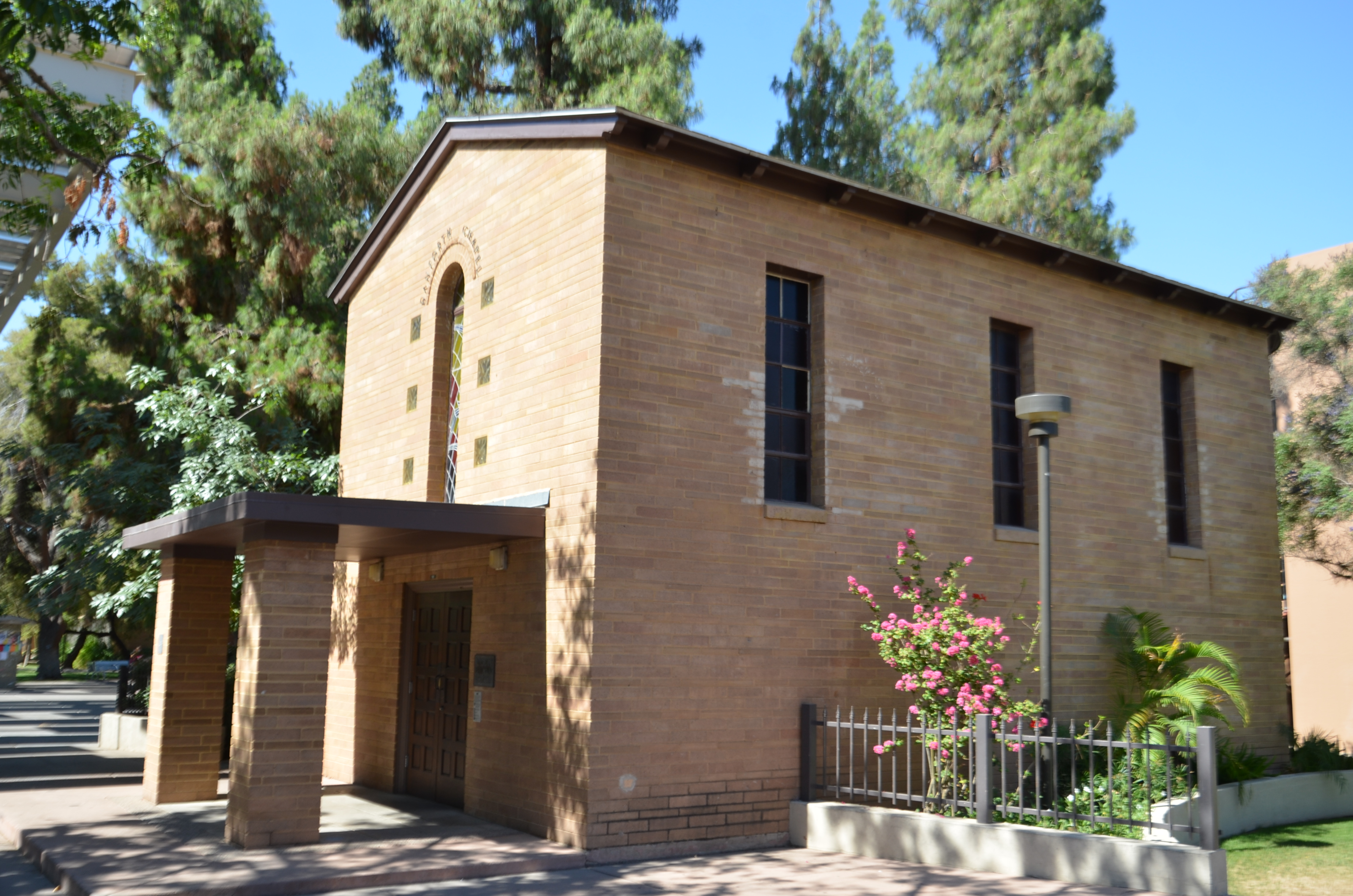
Arizona State University Danforth Chapel

Arizona State University (ASU), located in Tempe, Arizona, completed the construction of the campus' Danforth Chapel in 1947 and dedicated the chapel on February 26, 1948. William H. Danforth donated $5,000 to the campus, with the students raising the remaining $10,000 for the construction of the chapel through additional donations and fundraisers. The ASU Danforth Chapel, like many of the other Danforth Chapels, has been used for several weddings and religious ceremonies, as well as a place for rest and meditation.

The builders installed a cross on the chapel because of a miscommunication in the plans, but a student removed the cross before the chapel's dedication. The cross was reinstalled, however in 1990, the American Civil Liberties Union filed and won a lawsuit to remove the cross. (Which now is housed in the archives in the Hayden Library.) As many as 25 religious organizations continue to use the Danforth Chapel for services and events.

In 2008, Arizona State University celebrated the Danforth Chapel's 60 years by inviting the first chapel organist Jean Reaves-Clark, the first groom Colonel Billie Stephens (who married Dorothy McKenzie in 1948), and a Danforth Foundation "Danny Grad" Genie Hopper Zavaleta (1948 graduate) to be part of the event.

=== Kansas State College Danforth Chapel (1949) ===
The construction of the Danforth All-Faith Chapel at Kansas State University in Manhattan, Kansas, was completed in 1949. The building includes an auditorium addition next to the Chapel. The chapel is decorated with stained glass windows made from glass pieces that were imported for the chapel from Czechoslovakia, England, France, Germany, and Italy.

In 1956, the chapel and auditorium were dedicated to Kansas State University alumni and students who died serving in World War II and the Korean War.

=== Barnes Hospital Danforth Chapel (1950) ===
Barnes Hospital is located in St. Louis, Missouri, and the Danforth Chapel with the hospital was funded by the Danforth Foundation and dedicated on November 20, 1950. The hospital was originally part of the Children's Hospital, which moved to a new location on April 14, 1984, as the new St. Louis Children's Hospital. The chapel remains on the first floor of the Barnes Hospital as a place of meditation for patients and their families.

=== Hislop College Danforth Chapel (1950) ===
The Danforth Chapel at Hislop College, in Nagpur, India, is still used for worship services.

=== Montana State College Danforth Chapel (1952) ===
Montana State College is located in Bozeman, Montana. The Montana State College Danforth Chapel was built outside the campus to protect meditation privacy. The architect, Jewish student Emanuel Milstein, designed the chapel for his thesis project. The chapel's glass windows are memorials to Americans who lost their lives during World War II.

=== University of Chattanooga Danforth Chapel (1952) ===
The Danforth Chapel at the University of Tennessee at Chattanooga was built in 1952. The chapel, dedicated on January 17, 1952, seats 50 people. The chapel is a simple brick building with red carpeting, oak pews, and a small round window.

=== University of Iowa Danforth Chapel (1953) ===
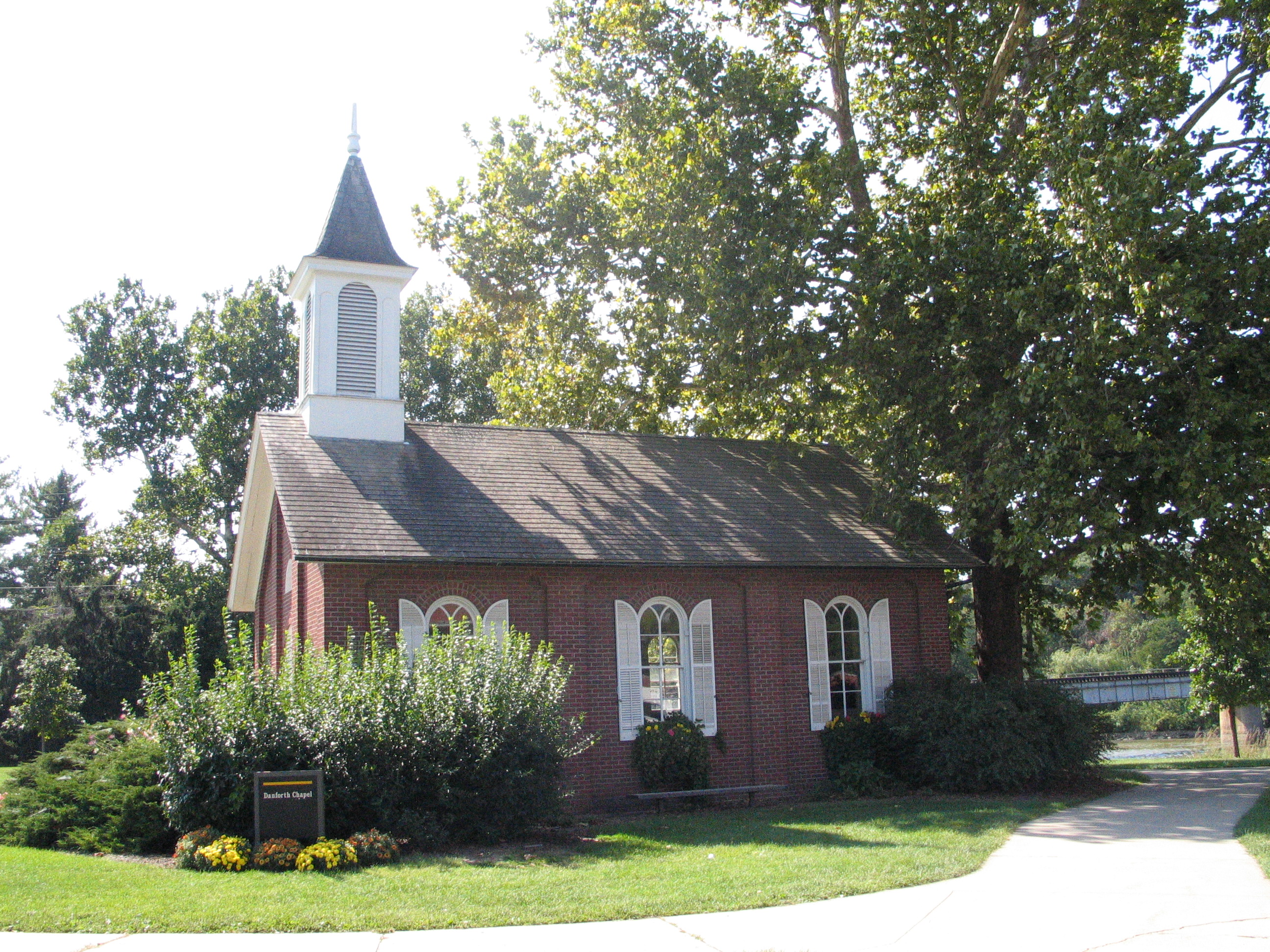
University of Iowa Danforth Chapel

The University of Iowa Danforth Chapel is located in Iowa City, Iowa. The architect for this Chapel was George Horner. The chapel sits in today's Hubbard Park, an area named for Philip Hubbard, a dean of students and the first Black American dean in the Big 10 universities. The chapel is a small red-brick building with a white cupola, and it sits next to the Iowa River. It continues to be a place for student weddings and meditation.

=== Bethesda General Hospital, St. Louis, MO (1954) ===
Bethesda General Hospital in St. Louis, Missouri, was founded in 1889 by Dr. Edward W. Saunders and Mr. and Mrs. Roger Hayne as a refuge for orphaned and abandoned children. The hospital moved to its present building in 1954, and, on July 11, 1954, the Danforth Foundation and the hospital dedicated the hospital's Danforth Chapel. The chapel is located on the first floor of the hospital and is intended to be a quiet place of meditation for patients and their families.

=== Colorado A&M Danforth Chapel (1954) ===
The Colorado State University Danforth Chapel is in Fort Collins, Colorado; the university previously was Colorado Agricultural and Mechanical College. The chapel was dedicated in 1954; it is renowned for its modern design. Its architect was James Hunter, who is interred in the chapel.

On October 22, 2016, the chapel was vandalized, and a unique stained-glass window that was part of the original design of the chapel was destroyed.

=== University of South Dakota Danforth Chapel (1954) ===
The University of South Dakota, in Vermillion, South Dakota, is home to a Danforth Chapel that was dedicated in 1954. The chapel was designed with a steep roof to handle the large amounts of snow that fall in South Dakota. The chapel continues to be used for prayer meetings, memorials, and weddings.

=== Bountiful Community Danforth Chapel (1955) ===
The Danforth Chapel at Bountiful Community Church in Bountiful, Utah, was built in 1955. The chapel was shared by the Bountiful Community Church and the Episcopal Church of the Resurrection (of Centerville, Utah) from 1967 to 1993.

=== Florida Southern College Danforth Chapel (1955) ===
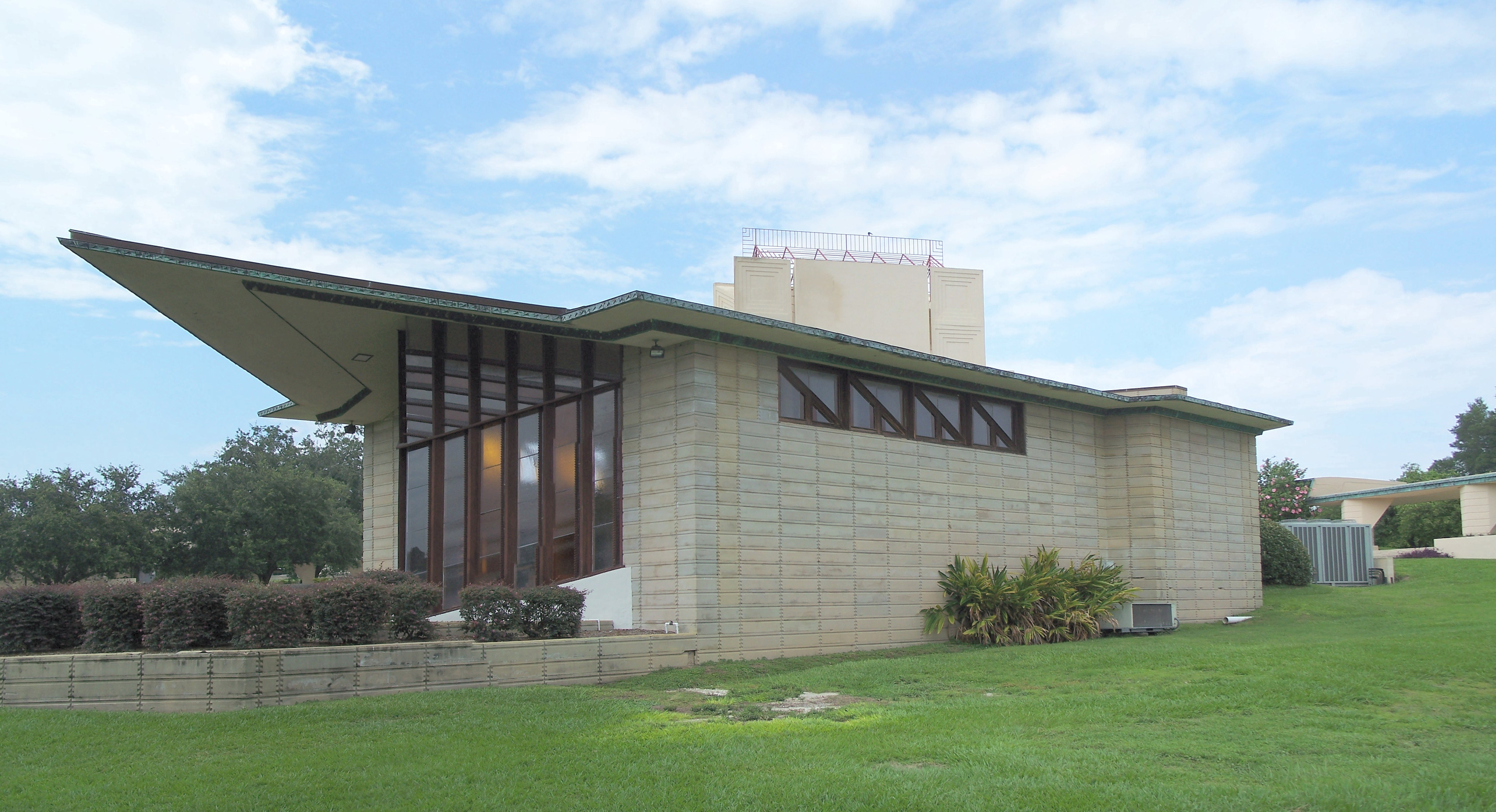
Florida Southern College Danforth Chapel

The Danforth Chapel at Florida Southern College, in Lakeland, Florida, was completed in 1955 by famous architect Frank Lloyd Wright. Although Wright designed several buildings on the Florida Southern campus, the Danforth Chapel is his only design on campus with leaded glass work. Wright also designed a suspended staircase in the chapel. The chapel, which sits next to the Annie Pfeiffer Chapel, is a miniature chapel that seats about 100 people.

The Danforth Chapel, along with other historic buildings on the Florida Southern College campus, are now registered as National Historic Landmarks.

=== Morehouse College Danforth Chapel (1955) ===
Designed by architect Edward C. Miller, the Danforth Chapel in Morehouse College, Atlanta, Georgia, was built in 1955. William H. Danforth not only donated toward the chapel, but he also funded scholarships for many Morehouse students. The campus is classified as a HBCU that has trained men who were seeking to be leaders.

=== Wartburg College Danforth Chapel (1955) ===
The Danforth Chapel at Wartburg College was built in 1955. This chapel has been demolished to make room for other campus buildings.

=== North Carolina State College Danforth Chapel (1956) ===
The Danforth Chapel at North Carolina State University in Raleigh, North Carolina, was built in 1957. The chapel was built as an extension of the YMCA King Religious Center, which was built in 1913. In 1975, the chapel and the YMCA King Religious Center were leveled to make room for the new College of Design.

=== Central Missouri State College Danforth Chapel (1957) ===
The Alumni Memorial Chapel at Central Missouri State University is in Warrensburg, Missouri. Adjacent to the Alumni Memorial Chapel is a wing that contains the Danforth Chapel.

=== YMCA Sunnen Lake Danforth Chapel (1957) ===
The chapel is to view the bank of Sunnen Lake at YMCA camps Lakewood and the Trout Lodge near Potosi, Missouri. The architect was Eric W. Smith, who designed 10 other buildings for YMCA camps that have been established since 1956.

=== Mary Institute and Saint Louis Country Day School Danforth Chapel (1955) ===
The Mary Institute and Saint Louis Country Day School in St. Louis, Missouri, dedicated its Danforth Chapel in 1957, when the school moved to a new location. The chapel was funded in part by a gift of $132,000 from the Danforth family to the campus and was boasted as the first gift from the Danforth Foundation to a campus other than a college. The chapel was red brick and two stories high, designed to enable all members of Country Day School to attend events in one location. The Danforth Foundation invested in Country Day School because of its legacy: three members of the family (William H. Danforth II, in 1944; Donald Danforth, in 1950; and John C. Danforth in 1954) graduated from Country Day School.

In 2012, the school learned that the chapel no longer met fire code, and the school administration decided to level the Danforth Chapel to make room for other campus structures; the "Concluding Assembly" was held on May 31, 2012.

=== Washington University School of Medicine Danforth Chapel ===
William Danforth, a graduate of Washington University in St. Louis, Missouri, funded a chapel in the Spencer T. Olin Residence Hall in the Washington University School of Medicine. The Danforth Chapel is available to medical-school students who reside in Olin Hall.

=== International Christian University—Seabury Memorial Chapel (1959) ===
The Seabury Memorial Chapel (partially funded by the Danforth Foundation) at International Christian University, Mitaka, Tokyo, Japan, was named after Ruth Isabel Seabury, a dedicated part of the university's founding and a Danforth Graduate (a "Danny Grad")—one of the ministry students who received financial support from the Danforth Foundation. Dedicated in 1959, the chapel was designed by W.M. Vories & Company.
