= John Welling House =

- U.S. National Register of Historic Places
- New Jersey Register of Historic Places
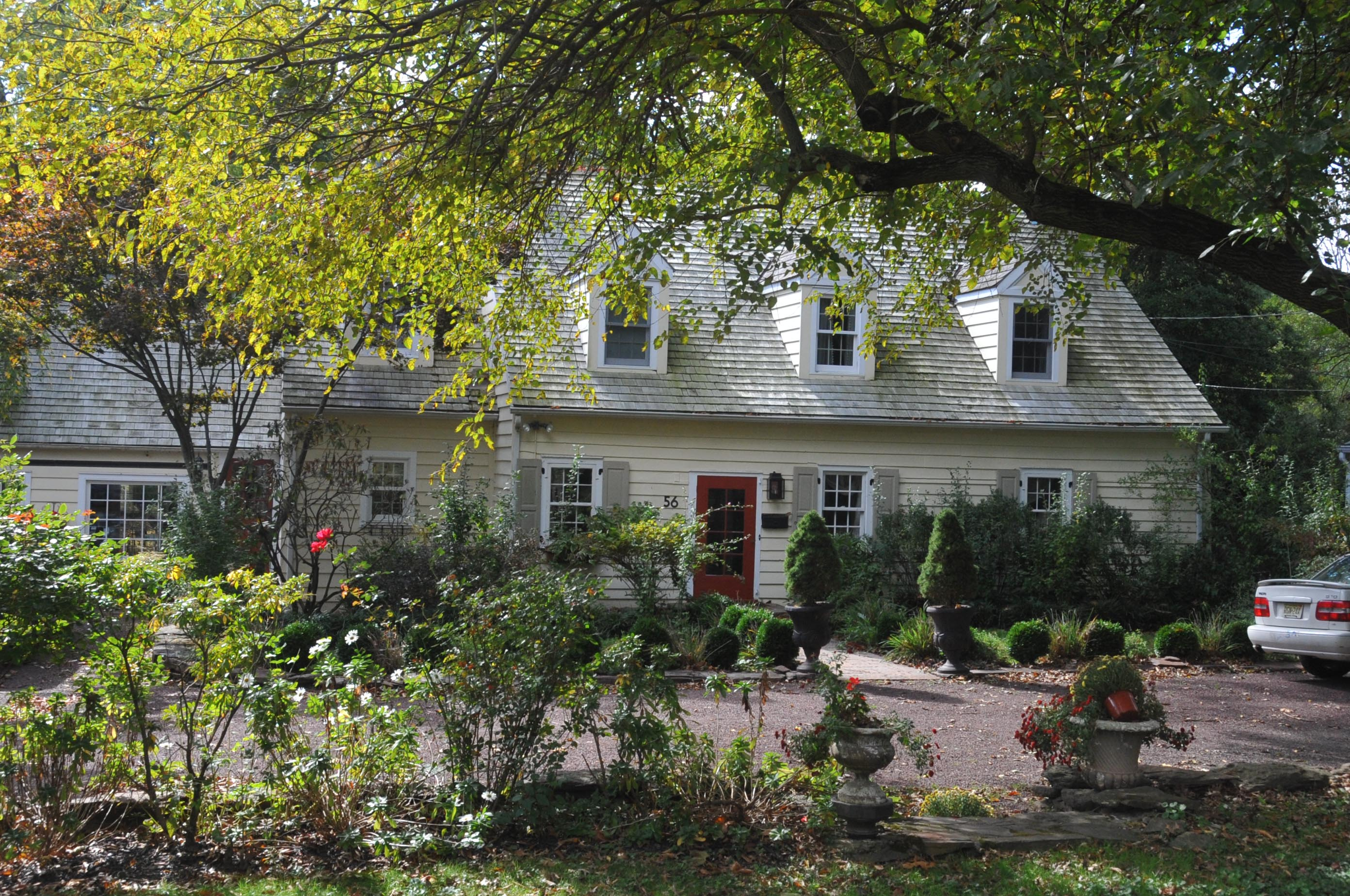

- Location within Mercer County, New Jersey Location within New Jersey Location within the United States
- Location: Curlis Avenue at Birch Street, Pennington, New Jersey
- Coordinates: 40°19′17.0″N 74°46′59.0″W
- Area: 1.5 acres (0.61 ha)
- Built: 1730s
- Architectural style: Dutch Colonial
- NRHP reference No.: 73001110
- NJRHP No.: 1707

Significant dates
- Added to NRHP: March 14, 1973
- Designated NJRHP: August 14, 1972

The John Welling House is a historic Dutch Colonial home in Pennington, New Jersey that dates to the early 18th century. John Welling moved to the Hopewell valley from Jamaica, New York in 1727 and leased the home and 223 acres (90 ha) farm from Terit Lester, purchasing it the next year. A tradition exists that during the British occupation of Pennington during the American Revolution a Hessian soldier was taken captive in the home. Welling's great-granddaughter, Elizabeth Welling, married John D. Hart who built the adjacent John D. Hart House, which is also on the National Register of Historic Places (NRHP). The home remained in the Welling family until 1921 and from 1928 until 1973 was home to Congressman Charles R. Howell. The house is a rare example of a Dutch clapboard and shingle house, one of the few remaining in Mercer County. It was documented by the Historic American Buildings Survey (HABS) in 1937 and was added to the NRHP on March 14, 1973, for its significance in architecture.

== See also ==
- National Register of Historic Places listings in Mercer County, New Jersey
