= Sylvia of Hollywood =

Exercise instructor (1881–1975)

- Born: 6 April 1881; Oslo, Norway
- Died: 2 March 1975 (aged 93); Santa Monica, California, U.S.
- Occupation: Fitness guru
- Years active: 1916–1931
- Spouses: Andrew Ulback (m. 1903; div. 1932) Edward Leiter (m. 1932; died 1975)
- Children: 2

Sylvia Ulback (6 April 1881 – 2 March 1975), known as Sylvia of Hollywood, was an early Hollywood fitness guru. Between 1926 and 1932, "Madame Sylvia", as she was also known, specialized in keeping movie stars camera-ready through stringent massage, diet and exercise.

== Early life ==
Sylvia was born Synnøve Johanne Waaler (or Wilhelmsen) in Kristiania, Norway (now Oslo). Her mother, Amelia Wilhelmsen, was an opera singer, and her father, Oscar Waaler, was an artist.

Forbidden to be a doctor by her parents, Sylvia went into nursing at 16. Having studied massage, she opened an office in Bremen, Germany when she was 18 years old. Sylvia and her first husband Andrew Ulback, a lumber dealer, went to America (first New York then Chicago) in 1921 or 1922 after her husband lost his business in the war.

In 1926, Sylvia, her husband, and their two sons relocated to Hollywood, ostensibly for Andrew's health. (She eschewed the use of her married name [Ulback or Ullback], hence its various spelling in contemporary references as Ulbeck, and Ulvert).

== Treatments ==
Sylvia stated that in 1921 she weighed in at 157 lbs at 5 feet tall and looked like a dutiful Norwegian wife. Seeing her husband, Andrew, flirting with his slender stenographer caused Sylvia to study reducing methods. Getting her own weight down to 95 lbs, Sylvia meshed dieting knowledge with her massage training. She applied those skills to a growing list of clientele, which included socialites and others in the public eye.

Promoting a three-pronged approach of massage, exercise and diet, Sylvia's techniques- said to "squeeze off fat," were infamous within the ranks of Hollywood. Her name became popularly associated with Hollywood slenderising, particularly in regard to massage which was then seen as a way to lose weight. Her overall methods would now be considered ineffective, yet her suggestions to stay active, be disciplined and eat wisely are still reasonable weight-loss advice even by modern standards.

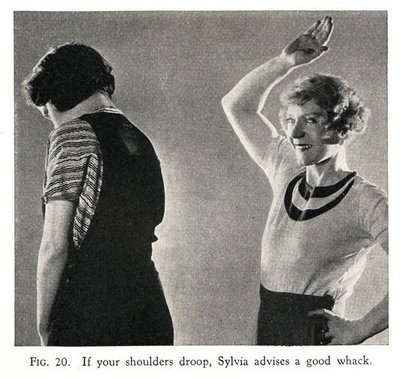
Sylvia of Hollywood (right) from page 67 of her best-selling book No More Alibis.(Photoplay Publishing Chicago, 1934), photographer uncredited

Sylvia's first client in Chicago was Julius Rosenwald (or in fact Rosenwald's grandmother) who introduced her to other wealthy clients.

Her first Hollywood client was Marie Dressler in 1925. By 1930, Sylvia was working at Pathe studio at $750 a week.

In that same year, she was hired by Joseph Kennedy for his mistress Gloria Swanson, who enthused over the miracles Sylvia worked on her body.

== Hollywood Undressed ==
In 1932, Sylvia exposed the foibles of the Hollywood system and her illustrious clientele in the book Hollywood Undressed: Observations of Sylvia as Noted by Her Secretary (1931). Although said to be penned by Sylvia's secretary, the playful book, full of gossip and contemporary vernacular, was ghostwritten by newspaper reporter and screenwriter James Whittaker, the first husband of Ina Claire.

Hollywood Undressed revealed intimate details of Sylvia's famous Hollywood clientele which included Jean Harlow, Marie Dressler, Mae Murray, Alice White, Bebe Daniels, Mary Duncan, Ramón Novarro, Ruth Chatterton, Ann Harding, Norma Talmadge, Grace Moore, Constance Bennett, Gloria Swanson, Nella Webb, F.W. Murnau, Elsie Janis, Ernest Torrence, Lawrence Tibbett, Laura Hope Crews, Ronald Colman, Constance Cummings, Ina Claire, John Gilbert, Carmel Myers, Helen Twelvetrees, Carole Lombard, Ilka Chase, Dorothy Mackaill, Pepi Lederer, Marion Davies, Neil Hamilton, Alan Hale Sr and Vivienne Segal.

Of Hollywood Undressed, Louella Parsons wrote, "Perhaps no one has ever played Hollywood quite as mean a trick as the woman who came here and made her money taking care of the stars and then turned around and wrote the cruelest articles about them that have ever been written. (The book has since been republished by Kessinger Publishing, LLC with a softcover version on 1 March 2007 and a hardback edition published 13 June 2008.)

Despite the repercussions of Hollywood Undressed, Sylvia continued to give her opinion on Hollywood and its denizens, with the confidence that her clients needed her more than she needed them:

I love them and I'm sorry for them. I'm never going back. There's too much clamor. You shrink up and get a false view of life. The only brainy people out there hide in their shells. Gloria Swanson—she's very childish. She has all the earmarks of a naughty little girl—and all the charm that goes with it. When I gave her treatments she'd yell and scream like a maniac. One time she crawled under the bed and wouldn't come out. She made nasty faces at me and I chased her around the house... Ann Harding is one of Hollywood's most intelligent. She has a brain like a man and works like man. Of course, she's a little careless about her appearance, like the great Maude Adams, but I love her. Norma Shearer and Marie Dressler are my favorites. Neither ever talks dirt. They're the squarest shooters of all. I never heard either criticize anyone.

On 23 May 1931, Sylvia headed east to New York with writer Ursula Parrott. By 1933, she had quit Hollywood entirely to concentrate on New York and a wider audience. From New York, where she pursued her publishing career, she was able to reach a wide audience that spanned from the east to the west coast and everywhere in between. Her articles as well as news about her reached local papers across the country.

== Further books ==
Sylvia wrote three books on health, appearance and beauty: No More Alibis (1934) Photoplay Publishing, Chicago, Pull Yourself Together Baby with cartoons by Paki (1936) Macfadden, New York. and Streamline Your Figure (1939), Macfadden, New York.

Priced at $1, No More Alibis was sixth on the non-fiction list of bestsellers from August 19 to September 17, 1936.

== Newsreel and radio ==
Broadcast between 1933 and 1936, Sylvia's radio show, Mme. Sylvia, was a 15-minute beauty and celebrity broadcast sponsored by Ry-Krisp. Syndicated across America, her show was aired at 7:30pm on station KGO and KFI. On 3 October 1932, Sylvia's guest was Glenda Farrell, and on 17 October the guest was Grace Moore.

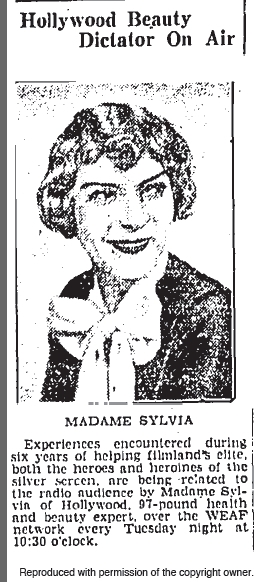
Advertisement for Madame Sylvia of Hollywood,The Hartford Courant, 22 October 1933, photographer uncredited. (used with permission from the Courant).

By 16 January 1934, Madame Sylvia of Hollywood broadcast over Boston's WEEI at 10:30am. By 1935, Sylvia was broadcast Wednesday nights at 10:15pm EST on stations WJZ, WBAL, WMAL, WBZ, WBZA, WSYR, WHAM, LDLA, WGAR, WENR, KWCR, KSO, KWK, KOIL, WREN, WTMJ, WIBA, WJR, KSTP, WEBC, KOA, KDYL, KPO, KFI, KGW, KOMO, KHQ and WCKY. She was also part of her sponsor Ry-Krisp's advertising campaigns.

According to Martin Lewis in Radio Guide (1935), Sylvia was on the air less than one minute for each of her shows: she knitted while she waited. A reference to her 'reducing talks' over the airwaves was published in the G-E Circle Bulletin, 7 June 1932. By 1933, her show contained dramatic sketches centering on movie stars, e.g. Dolores del Río and Irene Dunne, one of which landed her with a lawsuit from Ginger Rogers in 1934 (see #Lawsuits below).

In 1948, Sylvia was named "Radio phenomenon of the Thirties" in Radio & TV Life, which stated that she had "made the nation figure-conscious through her radio programs."

No recordings of Sylvia's shows are known to survive.

Fox Movietone newsreel footage featuring Sylvia, titled Sylvia the Hollywood Masseur (sic), dated 6 April 1932, is not known to survive although it is listed as archived. Pathe Newsreel footage of Sylvia titled, ? Keeps Movie Stars In Shape, dated 16 January 1932, seems to have been lost or destroyed, although it, too, is catalogued and described.

== Photoplay column ==
Sylvia had a column in Photoplay magazine, covering beauty tips, celebrity beauty issues and eventually reader's problems. The column began in February 1932 and went through various editorial changes for the next four years.

== Lawsuits ==
Silent screen and vaudeville actress Mae Murray lost a suit to Sylvia for $2,125.00 for six months of massage and care while the performer was on a 1927 vaudeville tour. A more intimate take on Murray's interchanges with Sylvia are outlined in Hollywood Undressed

In 1934, Sylvia denied knowledge of events which caused a $100K suit against her by Ginger Rogers, who claimed that she was not on Sylvia's show when an interviewee on the show was purported to be her.

Rogers won the lawsuit, settling out of court.

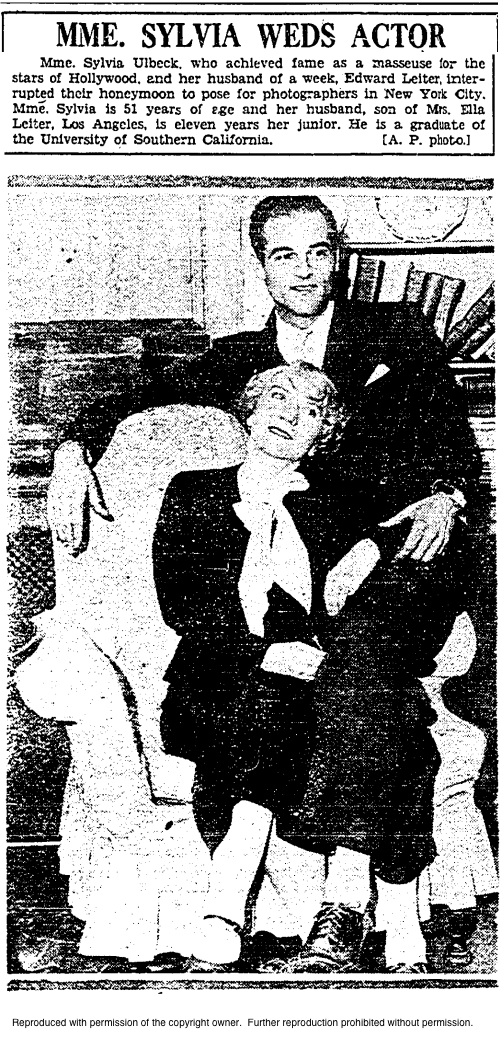
Sylvia Ulbeck marries Edward Leiter.(Los Angeles Times 11 July 1932 (A. P. Photo))

== Marriages and children ==
In 1903, Sylvia married Andrew Ulback (born Denmark 29 November 1880). The couple had two sons: Edward (aka Eyolf) Ulback (2 December 1903 - 22 February 1997) and Finn Ulback (24 August 1908 - 29 December 1969). Sylvia, Andrew and their sons immigrated to the US in 1921. By 1930, Andrew had a career as a beauty-cream manufacturer.

According to the 1930 census, both sons worked at film studios: Edward as a utility worker and Finn as a film cutter and later as a sound effects editor for TV, including the popular Combat! series. Both sons enlisted (as single men) in World War II, and had the rank of Private. Finn enlisted on 6 February 1943. Edward Ulback became a biblical/classical historian, listed as an author in various journal articles 1932-46. Although Finn married, neither of Sylvia's sons had children.

On 27 June 1932, Sylvia and Andrew divorced in Mexico. Andrew died on September 26, 1948, in Los Angeles.

On 1 July 1932, Sylvia married Edward Leiter (born 7 September 1903 in San Francisco), during a thunderstorm in Egremont, Massachusetts. Edward Leiter was the son of Mrs Ella Leiter of Los Angeles and a nephew of Joseph Leiter, Chicago financier. A graduate of the University of Southern California, he had performed in various stage productions and had studied in Budapest and Vienna.

== Later years and death ==
After 1939, Sylvia withdrew from the media. Sylvia and her husband Edward died within a month of each other in Santa Monica, California, with Edward dying in February 1975 and Sylvia following him in March 1975.

Sylvia was cremated at Odd Fellows Cemetery & Crematory in Los Angeles. Her ashes were scattered at sea. At the time of her death, her profession was listed as "housewife" for 60 years.

== Rediscovery ==
A radio documentary entitled Svelte Sylvia & The Hollywood Trimsters, was broadcast 26 August 2010 on BBC Radio 4

A digital history project exploring Sylvia and physical culture in the 1920s and 1930s was completed in 2012.
