= Danforth Foundation =

- Formation: 1927
- Founder: William H. Danforth
- Founded at: St. Louis
- Dissolved: 2011; 15 years ago
- Type: Private nonprofit foundation
- Legal status: Defunct
- Purpose: Granted funds in the St. Louis region
- Headquarters: St. Louis

The Danforth Foundation was one of the largest private nonprofit foundations in the St. Louis Metropolitan region. It closed its doors in 2011 after 84 years of operation and more than a billion dollars in grants distributed.

== Background ==
The Danforth Foundation was established in 1927 by Ralston Purina founder William H. Danforth and his wife. Grants from the Foundation were funded exclusively to the St. Louis region. In the 1950s and 1960s, it funded many projects involving religion and higher education. The Danforth Fellows Program, which supported graduate study in religion for scholars in other fields, was folded into the Society for Values in Higher Education. In 1973, Methodist minister and theologian Merrimon Cuninggim resigned as executive director because of a perceived conflict of interest from a $60 million grant to Washington University in St. Louis authorized by William Henry Danforth Jr., who was then both chairman of the foundation and chancellor of the university.

== See also ==
- Danforth Chapels
