= Webster Edgerly =

American activist (1852–1926)

Albert Webster Edgerly (December 20, 1852 – November 5, 1926) was a 19th and 20th century American social reform activist. He believed in involuntary racial euthanasia programs, a healthy diet and personal magnetism. He created the pseudoscientific Ralstonism movement.

== Personal life ==
Born December 20, 1852 in Salem, Massachusetts to Rhoda Lucinda Stone and John Foss Edgerly, he graduated from the Boston University School of Law in 1876. That same year he founded the Ralston Health Club. He married Edna Reed Boyts on July 5, 1892, in McConnellsville, Pennsylvania. He practiced law in Boston, Kansas, and Washington, D.C. In 1896 he began living eight months of the year at Ralston Heights, New Jersey, in what is known as Hopewell.

He died November 5, 1926, in Trenton, New Jersey, and his wife sold the property the following year.

== Self-help and religious writings ==
Under the pseudonym Edmund Shaftesbury, Edgerly was a prolific author of self-help and utopian religious texts, producing over 100 books, most of them "official" books to buy as a member of the Ralston Health Club. A recent critique described the books as "chock-full of racist rants, naive pseudoscience, and curmudgeonly attacks on modern society." He also dabbled unsuccessfully in real-estate speculation and the theater, and invented a language called "Adam-Man Tongue" that was "nothing more than a bizarre-looking version of English."

One of his books, Life Building Method of the Ralston Health Club, endorsed the consumption of whole grain cereal. When William Danforth of animal feeds maker Purina Mills began making a breakfast cereal similar to the kind described in the book in 1898, he sought and received the endorsement of Edgerly to market Ralston breakfast cereal. Ralston cereal became so successful that in 1902 Purina Mills was renamed Ralston-Purina. The breakfast cereal operations evolved into Ralcorp.

== Personal beliefs ==
Edgerly saw his followers as the founding members of a new race, based on Caucasians, being free from "impurities". He advocated for the castration of all "anti-racial" (non-Caucasian) males at birth.

== Works ==
- The Ralston brain regime : presenting a course of conduct, exercises and study, designed to develop perfect health in the physical brain, strengthen the mind, and increase the power of thought : a book of practice, more than theory Washington, D.C. : Martyn College Press, 1891
- The Shaftesbury school of philosophy known as the story of our existences or the doctrine of diversity Washington, D.C., Shaftesbury college, 1894
- Companion book of complete membership in the Ralston Health Club : in seventeen departments; being a complete study of the natural causes and the natural cures of disease, without medicines or apparatus of any kind Washington, D.C. : Martyn College Press Association, 1895
- Cultivation of the chest Washington, D.C. : Martyn College Press, 1895
- Book of general membership of the Ralston Health Club 7th ed. Washington, Martyn College Press Assoc., 1898
- Book of the Psychic Society: A Study of the Fourteen Unseen Powers That Control Human Life; and Containing Immortality, A Scientific Demonstration of Life After Death Washington: Ralston University Pub. Co., 1908
- Life building method of the Ralston health club [Hopewell, N.J.] Issued by the Ralston health club 1920
- Instantaneous Personal Magnetism: Combining an Absolutely New Method with the Best Established Teachings of the Past 14th edition enlarged; Manchester, UK: Psychology Pub. Co., 1935
- A study of the unseen powers that control human life, 1908
- Advanced Magnetism, 1906
- Book of the mind and thought society, 1911
- Brain tests, 1924
- Child life, 1897
- Complete membership in the Ralston health club, 1892
- Cultivation of Personal Magnetism in Seven Progressive Steps: The Exercise...
- Edgerly natural reader, 1912
- Future seeing and destiny, 1912
- GREAT PSYCHIC: The Master Power of the Universe
- Higher magnetism
- How to Get Rid of Sickness: Ralston Classic No. One
- How to make personality pay; an introduction to the study of personal...
- Immortality, 1898
- Lessons in artistic deep breathing for strengthening the voice, 1888
- Lessons in emphasis, 1893
- Lessons in grace, 1889
- Lessons in the art of extemporaneous speaking, 1889
- Lessons in the art of facial expression, 1889
- Lessons in the art of ventriloquism, 1891
- Lessons in the mechanics of personal magnetism, 1888
- Lessons in voice culture, 1891
- Lessons on acting, 1889
- Life Electricity
- Life's secrets revealed
- Mental Magnetism: a Study of the Seven Realms of Mind and Mastery in the Conflicts of Life, 1924
- One hundred lessons in punctuation, 1893
- One hundred points of character, 1892
- Operations of the Other Mind: Making Known the Unseen Powers of the...
- Personal magnetism
- Private Lessons in the Cultivation of Magnetism of the Sexes
- Ralston gardens, 1900
- Ralston's simplified physiology, 1892
- Real life, when things are right, 1903
- Right, 1923
- Sex magnetism, 1910
- Shaftesbury's secrets
- Solution of life, 1916
- The Adam-man tongue, 1903
- The authority dictionary, 1891
- The book of books, 1897
- The Book of Shaftesbury's Secrets: Disclosing Priceless Methods for...
- The goal of creation, a constructive course in human progress within the temple of great achievements, 1920
- The greatest things in human life, 1915
- The natural reader, 1891
- The new education, 1900
- The origin of man, 1925
- The Other Mind: Including The Science Of All Phenomena And The Practice Of all forms of human control of others, 1909
- The Ralston health club, 1893
- The Shaftesbury recitations, 1889
- The two hundred year club, 1893
- The two sexes, 1898
- Thought Transference; or, The Radio-Activity of the Human Mind
- Transference of thought, 1896
- Universal magnetism; a private training course in the magnetic control of others, by the most powerful of all known methods, 1924
- Yourself behind closed doors
