= Oconomowoc Canning Company =

American food company

The Oconomowoc Canning Company, later briefly named Stokely USA, was an American food canning and distribution corporation established in 1920 that operated independently until 1997. It was founded and headquartered in Oconomowoc, Wisconsin.

The company created and owned the original "Land O'Lakes" trademark, selling canned vegetables. The company successfully defended this trademark in a federal legal case with the dairy cooperative Land O'Lakes Creameries, Inc., best known for the butter "Land O'Lakes". The butter company sued the vegetable company over the name, and the resulting 1963/1964 federal court decisions in Land O'Lakes Creameries, Inc. v. Oconomowoc Canning Co. was important in establishing legal precedent in United States trademark law regarding the doctrine of "naked licensing".

Oconomowoc Canning Company eventually purchased the Stokely vegetable canning company in 1984, went public soon after, became the third largest vegetable caner in the United States, before merging into the larger conglomerate Chiquita Brands International in 1997 and ceasing to exist as an independent entity, although products were still sold under the Stokely brand.

== Company history ==
The Oconomowoc Canning Company was incorporated in 1920 in the town of Oconomowoc, Wisconsin. Its primary business was canning vegetables, which it sold under both its own trademarks and the private labels of various retail and wholesale food establishments. It was founded by Peter and Philip Binzel, owners of the Binzel Brewing Company, as an alternative business to beer during prohibition. The company first applied the "Land O'Lakes" trademark to its canned peas in 1920, and expanded to other vegetables in 1928. On May 14, 1924, Oconomowoc filed for the formal registration of the "Land O'Lakes" trademark for canned vegetables, which was granted by the U.S. Patent Office on September 9 of that year.

To expand to the East Coast, it established a distribution relationship in 1924 with Howard E. Jones & Company, a food brokerage partnership based in Baltimore, Maryland. Oconomowoc initially granted the Jones firm an oral authorization to use the "Land O'Lakes" mark on various canned goods throughout Maryland and adjacent areas. In 1937, this arrangement was formalized with written license agreements, and the Baltimore brokerage adopted the trade style name "Ocono Co." Howard E. Jones & Company sourced a line of "Land O'Lakes" canned foods for the Baltimore Wholesale Grocery Company. To ensure product quality, the Jones firm regularly tested the canned goods using government grading standards, opening random cans to inspect flavor and appearance, and sending questionable samples to independent testing facilities. The superior quality control practiced by Howard E. Jones & Company would later play a key role in winning a legal battle with the butter company over use of the trademark "Land O'Lakes".

In 1984, Oconomowoc Canning Company purchased from Quaker Oats the "Stokely Finest" label for canned vegetables, along with canning factories. At the same time, Oconomowoc changed its corporate name to Stokely USA. It soon after went public under the lead of Joseph Weix, grandson of the founder, Binzel. It was at the time the third largest vegetable canning company in the USA. In 1997, Chiquita Brands International acquired Stokely USA for $110 million in stock-and-debt. It merged with Chiquita's other canning units (such as Friday Canning) to form a new subsidiary called Chiquita Processed Foods. In 2003, Chiquita sold the entire Chiquita Processed Foods division to Seneca Foods for $214 million in cash, debt and stock.

== Trademark lawsuit ==
Oconomowoc was selling canned peas during the first half of the 1920s under the name "Land O'Lakes". In 1926, a Minnesota dairy cooperative, originally named the Minnesota Co-operative Creameries Association, changed its name to Land O'Lakes Creameries, Inc. As the dairy subsequently company grew into a national brand, it sought sole control of the name Land O'Lakes.

After a number of lower court suits during the 1950s proved unsuccessful for Land O'Lakes Creameries, Inc., in the early 1960s they sued the Oconomowoc Canning Company in federal court. They sought the cancellation of Oconomowoc's trademark registrations. The central legal argument relied on the concept of "naked licensing". This was a practice where a trademark owner licenses a mark/brand without controlling the quality of the goods sold under it, which under trademark law typically results in the legal abandonment of the trademark. The dairy company pointed to Oconomowoc's reliance on a verbal agreement with Howard E. Jones & Company from 1924 to 1937 as evidence that the canning company failed to monitor the quality of its brand.

In 1963, the United States District Court for the Eastern District of Wisconsin ruled in favor of the Oconomowoc Canning Company. The court found that the canning company had not abandoned its trademark. The licensee, Howard E. Jones, had actively exercised quality control by testing and grading the canned vegetables himself. The decision was affirmed by the Seventh Circuit Court of Appeals in 1964 (330 F.2d 667).

The case remains a frequently cited precedent in intellectual property law. It established the precedent that actual, hands-on quality control efforts by a reliable licensee can satisfy the legal requirement for brand oversight. It can defeat a claim of trademark abandonment, even if those efforts originated under a verbal agreement rather than a formal written contract.
