= Richard B. Flavell =

British molecular biologist

Richard Flavell
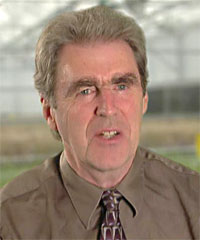
- Born: Richard Bailey Flavell; 11 October 1943 (age 82); Birmingham, England
- Citizenship: UK
- Education: University of Birmingham; University of East Anglia
- Awards: FRS (1998)
- Scientific career
- Fields: Plant molecular genetics, Plant breeding
- Workplaces: John Innes Centre
- Doctoral advisor: John Fincham
- Doctoral students: Jonathan D. G. Jones

Richard Bailey Flavell CBE, FRS (born 11 October 1943) is a British molecular biologist, Chief Scientific Officer of Ceres, Inc., and was director of John Innes Centre from 1987 to 1998.

== Life ==
He was educated at the University of Birmingham (BSc, 1964 in Microbiology) and at the University of East Anglia (PhD, 1967 focused on the genetics of acetate utilization in Neurospora crassa). Following that he held a Postdoctoral Fellowship at Stanford University, Stanford, California, 1967–69 where he studied mitochondrial structure and function in Neurospora crassa. He then took up an appointment at the Plant Breeding Institute, Cambridge, in the Department of Cytogenetics under the leadership of Ralph Riley. In the following years he built up a team of plant molecular geneticists that was one of the first to clone plant DNA, to produce transgenic plants and to determine the structure of a plant mitochondrial genome.

== Works ==
- Nicholas J. Brewin, Richard B. Flavell, "A cure for anemia in plants?", Nature Biotechnology 15, 222–223 (1997)
- Richard B Flavell, "A greener Revolution for All". Nature Biotechnology 34 1106–1110, 2016
