= Vincent Gruppuso =

American businessman

Vincent Gruppuso (October 25, 1940 – December 29, 2007) was an American businessman and former deliveryman, who created and founded Kozy Shack, a multimillion-dollar company known for its pudding.

== Early life ==
Gruppuso was born in Brooklyn, New York, on October 25, 1940, to parents Joseph and Mazie Ditta Gruppuso. His dad was a construction worker and his mother was a seamstress.

He worked as an aerial photographer in the United States Navy during the late 1950s, before returning to Brooklyn. He worked at several jobs before being hired by the Arnold Bread company as a deliveryman.

Gruppuso's marriage to Virginia Pantaleo ended in divorce.

== Kozy Shack Enterprises ==
Gruppuso continued to work as a bread deliveryman in Brooklyn during the 1960s. He discovered the Cozy Shack delicatessen on Seneca Avenue in Brooklyn, which happened to be one of his delivery stops. He soon began selling trays of the puddings from the Cozy Shack to his other customers on his delivery route, in addition to the bread.

He bought the recipe for the puddings outright from the Cozy Shack delicatessen in 1967 and opened a small factory in Ridgewood, Queens. The small company quickly expanded into a major business. As of January 2008, Gruppuso's company has more than 400 employees working in three plants, which are located in Turlock, California, Hicksville, New York and Lough Egish, Ireland. The company estimated its total revenue at around $140 million in 2007, much of it from the sale of 115 million containers of pudding and pastries during that year. Kozy Shack puddings are sold throughout Europe, the United States, Mexico and Canada.

In 2006, The New York Times named Kozy Shack's rice pudding as one of its "Grocery Gems."

In 2012, Kozy Shack Enterprises was sold to Land O'Lakes.

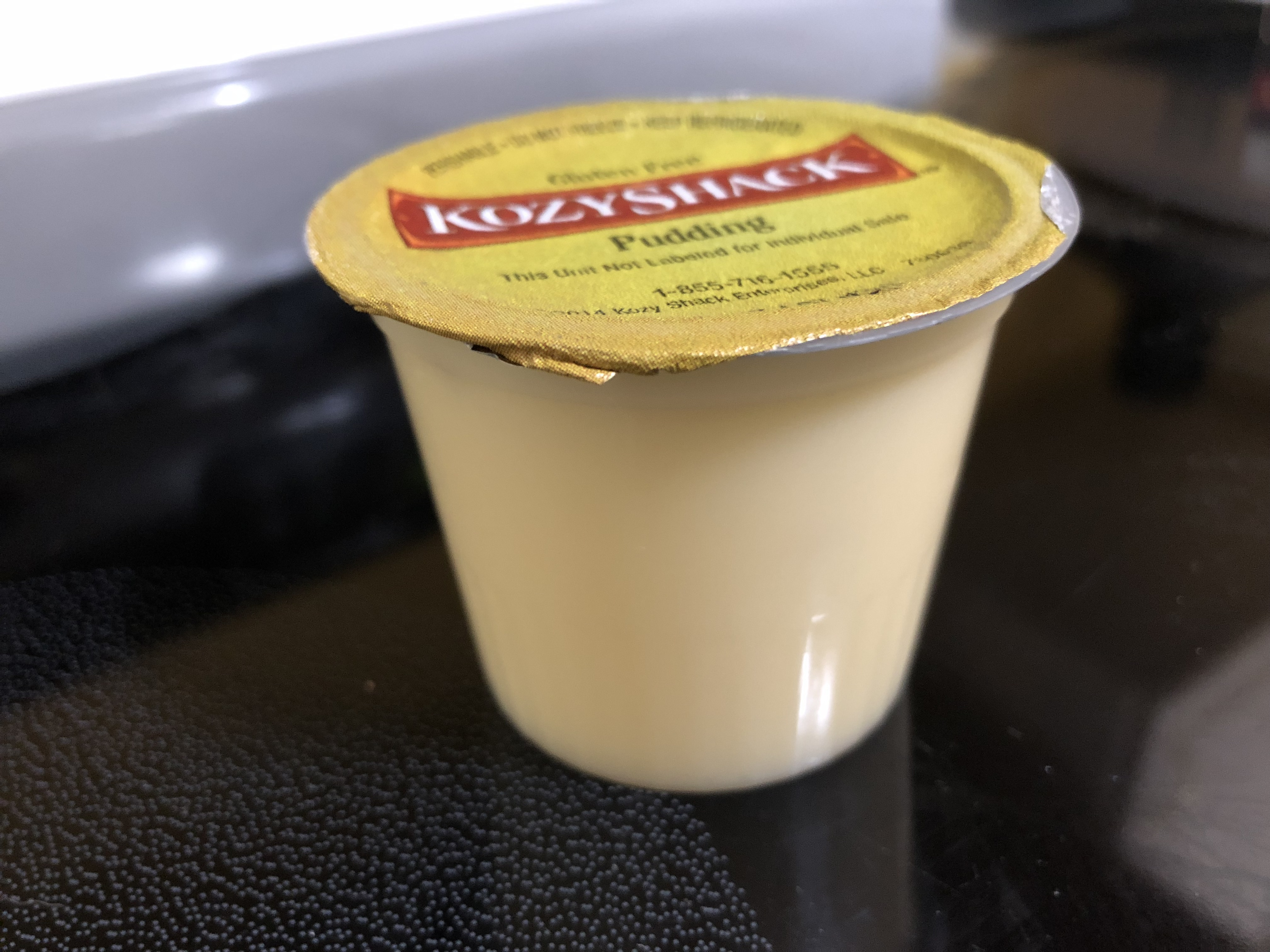
Kozy Shack pudding

== Death ==
Gruppuso died at his home in East Hampton, New York, on December 29, 2007, of complications from diabetes at the age of 67. He is survived by three daughters, his former wife, a brother and sister, and five grandchildren.
