= Ry-Krisp =

American brand of rye crispbread

- Type: Cracker
- Place of origin: United States
- Region or state: Minnesota
- Invented: 1899; 126 years ago
- Main ingredients: Rye

Ry-Krisp is an American brand of rye crisp bread that was introduced in 1899. Based in Minneapolis, Minnesota, the Ry-Krisp plant was purchased by Ralston Purina in 1926. In 1994, the Ralston portion of Ralston Purina was spun off into a new company called Ralcorp Holdings, including the RyKrisp operations. Ralcorp was acquired by ConAgra Foods in 2013.

In January 2015 ConAgra Foods announced that the factory that produces RyKrisp would be closed and the product would be discontinued due to declining demand. RyKrisp Inc. bought the brand in April 2015 with plans to revitalize it once a new manufacturing partner was found. A larger-scale commercialization was planned for October 2015 with commercial production expected some time after that. As of fall 2018 production had not yet started. The owners of the RyKrisp brand gave legal issues as a reason. The reason for the legal issues lay with a dispute between RyKrisp and the baking company, Distinctive Foods. Due to concerns about Distinctive Food's ability to produce product, RyKrisp moved the equipment purchased from ConAgra to their own warehouse. RyKrisp alleged that Distinctive's CEO moved the equipment back to its own facility and refused to return it, demanding an additional $50,000. At this point RyKrisp contracted with iBake, who later cancelled the contract after Distinctive allegedly sent a cease and desist letter to iBake.

RyKrisp took Distinctive to court, where they were defended by State Automobile Mutual Insurance Company in the case State Auto Property & Casualty Insurance Co. v. Distinctive Foods, LLC. State Auto found that Distinctive's policy did not provide coverage in this instance and the case went to trial. In October 2019 the Ry-Krisp owners wrote that their "attorneys succeeded in securing an $8.3 million verdict from a Cook County jury in favor of Firm client RyKrisp, LLC in a dispute between the rye cracker producer and (its contract manufacturer). ... The judgment ensures that RyKrisp will recover damages and lost profits following (the) conversion of RyKrisp's equipment and tortious efforts to interfere with RyKrisp's business."

On 23 May 2024, RyKrisps stated that due to the costs involved with litigation and lack of funds they would no longer be able to go forward with production.

== See also ==
- List of crackers
- Ryvita
