= Beth Ford =

American businessperson

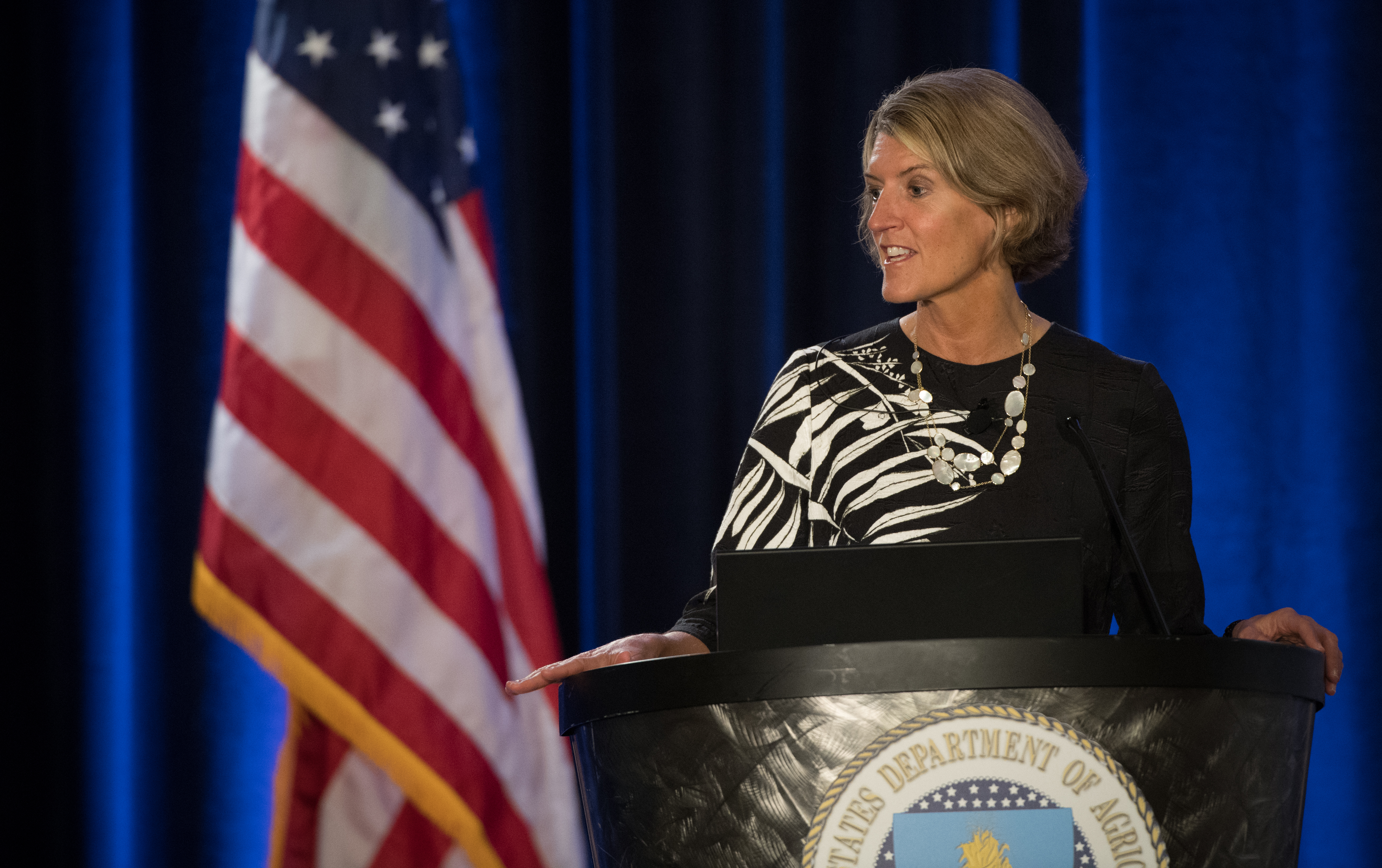
- Born: March 1964 (age 62); Sioux City, Iowa, U.S.
- Education: Iowa State University (BBA); Columbia University (MBA)
- Known for: CEO of Land O'Lakes
- Spouse: Jill Schurtz
- Children: 3

Beth E. Ford (born 1964) is an American businessperson. Ford is most notable for being the CEO of Land O'Lakes, an American agricultural cooperative which she assumed leadership of in 2018. She is the first openly gay female CEO of an American Fortune 500 company. She is a member of the President's Export Council. In 2023. She was ranked 26th on Fortune's list of Most Powerful Women.

== Early life and education ==
Ford was born in Sioux City, Iowa, the fifth in a family of eight children, and attended Catholic schools through high school. Her father was a truck driver and a used car salesman, while her mother was a nurse before completing her master's degree and becoming a psychologist. Ford's mother was left in an orphanage when she was five by her parents, eventually getting adopted at age ten. Her mother demonstrated to her children how to overcome hardship. Ford claims that her mother "has been the most significant role model to me in my life".

Ford started working in the agriculture business at age 12, making $2 an hour de-tasseling corn and worked a number of jobs to support her college education, including as a janitor, house painter, and convenience store cashier.

Ford completed her undergraduate degree at Iowa State University, where she pursued her interests in marketing, finance and operations and was initiated into Alpha Gamma Delta.

== Career ==
=== Early career ===
Ford's first job was with Mobil Oil Company when she was in her 20s on the tanker, the marketing and refining side. She then worked in supply-chain management at ExxonMobil, Pepsi, and Scholastic, among other companies.

=== Land O'Lakes ===
Ford joined Land O'Lakes in 2011, being named as chief supply chain and operations officer. She continued at the company, eventually being promoted to COO, and in August 2018 was appointed as president and CEO by an all-male board. At the time Ford became CEO, she was one of 25 women leading Fortune 500 companies. She is the ninth person to hold this position. She became the first openly-gay female CEO of a Fortune 500 company. As CEO, Ford has invested heavily in Land O'Lakes implementation of new technologies in agriculture as well as the vibrancy of rural communities.

Ford has stated that the biggest challenges facing American farmers is policy uncertainty, weather and the changing climate, and a lack of broadband access. In Ford's view, the key to preserving American agriculture relies upon innovation, technology, and political stability. Ford has been an advocate for getting high-speed Internet access to rural and underserved areas, calling on the government to provide funds to close the 'digital divide' that is impacting employment, education, and progress. She has also called on major companies and organizations to join the American Connection Project, an effort started by Land O'Lakes to advocate for three main principles: robust federal funding for broadband infrastructure, improved broadband connectivity mapping and better coordination of federal and state agencies to deploy funding.

In August 2019, Ford was one of 181 leading CEOs in the United States to sign Business Roundtable's new Statement on the Purpose of a Corporation. The new statement include that companies should serve not only their shareholders, but also deliver value to their customers, invest in employees, deal fairly with suppliers, and support the communities in which they operate. Ford is quoted as saying the new statement matches the history of Land O'Lakes as a farmer-owned cooperative.

In February 2020, the Land O'Lakes company removed the Native American woman as its logo on its butter and cheese products. Ford is quoted as saying the removal of the "butter maiden" to the words "farmer owned" was more about what the farmer-owned co-op wanted to communicate rather than what it didn't, that the change did not come from pressure placed on the company. She stated that the new images of fields, lakes, and farmers on their packaging represent Land O’ Lakes is a cooperative, owned not by public market shareholders but by the farmers who make its butter, animal feed and more.

In a 2022 interview, Ford shared her experience on what has shaped her to become a CEO. Ford gave advice on how she pays attention to her physical health that which gives her mental clarity. She practices gratitude to her family and her support team. Ford emphasises two traits that she sees are essential in business; humility and authenticity.

== Appearances & recognition ==
In 2018 Ford was named in Fortune's Most Powerful Women in Business list. Ford was named to the Fortune Most Powerful Women List in 2020 for the third year in a row. Ford was also named to the 2021 and 2022 Fast Company Queer 50 list.

Ford sits on the board of directors of the Business Roundtable, US Global Leadership Coalition, Paccar, and the Columbia University Deming Center as well as Iowa State University College of Business. In 2021, Ford was elected to the BlackRock Inc. board of directors.

In 2024, Ford was named on Time's 100 Most Influential People list.

Ford sits on the board of directors for Starbucks Corporation.

== Personal life ==
Ford is married to Jill Schurtz, the CEO of the St. Paul's Teachers' Retirement Fund Association. They have three children.

== Works ==
- "Land O'Lakes CEO: Farmers Are in Crisis—and America Isn't Paying Attention", op-ed in Dairy Business, June 13, 2019.
- "Land O’Lakes CEO Beth Ford and other LGBTQ business leaders talk about the hard work that led to Supreme Court success", op-ed in Fortune, June 18, 2020.
- "Land O'Lakes CEO: How businesses can help America's struggling farmers", op-ed for CNN Business, October 12, 2020.
