= Ceres, Inc. =

Former US energy crop seeds developer

- Type: Public
- Traded as: Nasdaq: CERE
- Industry: Biotechnology
- Founded: 1996; 30 years ago
- Headquarters: Thousand Oaks, California, United States
- Key people: Richard Hamilton (president and CEO)
- Products: Seeds of energy crops
- Parent: Land O'Lakes
- Subsidiaries: Ceres Sementes do Brasil
- Website: ceres.net

Ceres, Inc. was a biotechnology company based in Thousand Oaks, California, United States that operated from 1996 to 2016, when it was acquired by Land O'Lakes. The company was a spinoff from UCLA researchers. Its ultimate commercial products were seeds of genetically modified crops used for biofuel production. In addition to its operations in the United States, Ceres had a subsidiary in Brazil called Ceres Sementes do Brasil.

== History ==
The company was founded in 1996 by UCLA professor Bob Goldberg and corporate partners with an initial capital of $50 million and an off-campus laboratory site overlooking Malibu, CA. In 2002, the company signed a $137 million licensing agreement with Monsanto for their technology.

Richard Flavell was Chief Scientific Officer from 1998 until the 2012 public offering. From its 2012 initial public offering that raised $65 million until its acquisition, it was listed on the NASDAQ exchange. In 2012, the largest shareholders were Artal Luxembourg, Warburg Pincus, Ambergate Trust, and Oxford Bioscience, while biotechnology company Monsanto had 4.8% stake. The company's president and CEO was Richard Hamilton.

A second public offering in 2014 raised an additional $20 million at $1 per share compared to the 2012 IPO at $13.

On June 21, 2016, Ceres was acquired by Land O'Lakes for $17.2 million.

== Products and research ==
A major early (2000) accomplishment was the full-length cDNA-sequencing of Arabidopsis thaliana in collaboration with Genset with subsequent publication of the sequencies in TIGR and NCBI and submission to US PTO, and the characterization of Arabidopsis AFLP fragments in collaboration with Keygene NV. In 2006, Ceres began a collaboration with the Noble Research Institute to develop switchgrass. Starting in 2009, Ceres sold sweet sorghum, switchgrass and high biomass sorghum seeds. It tested biofuel production from switchgrass and miscanthus. In 2010, Ceres started to cooperate with Novozymes to improve the enzyme cocktails for biorefinery switchgrass and sweet sorghum. USAID funded Ceres' research on biotech traits and trait stacks in rice for Asia.
