= Philip G. Hubbard =

Philip Gamaliel Hubbard (March 4, 1921 – January 10, 2002) was a university professor and administrator who was the first African-American faculty member at the University of Iowa, the first African-American administrator at any of Iowa's state universities and the first African-American vice president at a Big 10 university. In August 2012 Hubbard was inducted into the Iowa African American Hall of Fame.

== Early life ==
Hubbard was born in Macon, Missouri. His mother taught school in Missouri's segregated school system. Wanting a better education for her children, she relocated the family to Iowa when Philip was four years old. Iowa schools were integrated at that time. His mother, however, could not get a teaching job and found employment as an elevator operator in Des Moines, Iowa.

Hubbard graduated there in 1939 from North High School in Des Moines. He was active in band, orchestra, chorus, biology club, freshman football, and was in the National Honor Society. By the time he graduated from high school, he had saved $252.50 for college by shining shoes for 15 cents per pair at the Savery Hotel in Des Moines.

== College ==
Hubbard choose to attend the University of Iowa over Iowa State because he could shine shoes at the Jefferson Hotel in Iowa City in order to pay his tuition, which was $50 per semester. Hubbard enrolled at the University of Iowa in 1940.

In 1943 he enlisted in the Army Reserves, and in 1944 received an Army certification in electrical engineering from Pennsylvania State University. Francis M. Dawson, Dean of the College of Engineering at the university of Iowa, arranged for Hubbard's discharge in 1945 to conduct war research at the University of Iowa, and he graduated with honors June 1, 1947, with a Bachelor of Science in Electrical Engineering.

== Professional career ==
Hubbard was appointed as research engineer in July 1947, making him the first black faculty member at the University of Iowa. He subsequently obtained a Master's degree in 1949 and a doctorate in 1954, both from the University of Iowa. From 1954 until his retirement in 1991 he was a professor of mechanical engineering;

In 1966, Hubbard was appointed Dean of Academic Affairs. He was the first black administrator at any of the Iowa's universities. In 1971 he was named Vice President of Student Services, becoming the first black vice-president at a Big Ten university. He served in this position until December 31, 1990, when he retired from the University of Iowa.

As a memorial to him, the field next to the Student Union on the University of Iowa campus was renamed Hubbard Park on December 6, 1991.

In June 1999, he published the book: My Iowa Journey: The Life Story of the University of Iowa's First Tenured African American Professor. Hubbard died on January 10, 2002, at the age of 80.

== Sources ==
- Collection Guide to the Papers of Phillip G. Hubbard, University of Iowa Archives, Dept. of Special Collections, University of Iowa Libraries Iowa City, Iowa
- “My Iowa Journey: The Life Story of the University of Iowa’s First African American Professor,”
- University of Iowa News Service, Jan 11, 2002
