= Hopewell Valley, New Jersey =

Coordinates: 40.38356°N 74.80350°W

Hopewell Valley is a group of communities in Mercer County, New Jersey loosely affiliated through municipal service sharing agreements, all of which send their students to the Hopewell Valley Regional School District.

The area referred to as Hopewell Valley comprises the township of Hopewell (2000 census population of 16,105), the Borough of Hopewell (2,035), the Borough of Pennington (2,696), and the unincorporated census-designated place Titusville (which is within Hopewell Township).

The school district includes four elementary schools (Hopewell Elementary, Toll Gate Grammar, Bear Tavern, and the recently opened Stony Brook Elementary School), a middle school (Timberlane Middle School) and a high school (Hopewell Valley Central High School). Before regionalization of the school district in the 1950s, the high school was simply known as Central High School of Hopewell Township, and the moniker Central High School (sans the Hopewell Valley) persists to some extent in the state of New Jersey as the school's (albeit incorrect) official name.

== Historic events ==
General George Washington's crossing of the Delaware River from Pennsylvania to New Jersey leading to the victory at the Battle of Trenton on the morning of December 26, 1776 is commemorated at Washington Crossing State Park in Titusville. The crossing is re-enacted each year if the weather permits. Hopewell Valley is also the site of the notorious kidnapping of the Charles Lindbergh infant in 1932.

== Notable people ==
- Peter Benchley, who drew from the names of local streets and roads in creating the fictional town of Amity in his 1974 novel Jaws.
- John Hart, a signer of the Declaration of Independence, lived in Hopewell Township. He is buried in Hopewell Borough.

== See also ==
- Ralstonism
