= Land O'Lakes =

Agricultural cooperative based in Minnesota

Land O'Lakes, Inc.
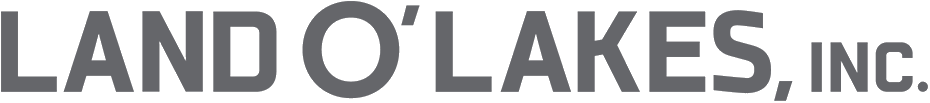
- Type: Agricultural cooperative
- Industry: Food and agriculture
- Founded: July 8, 1921; 105 years ago
- Headquarters: Arden Hills, Minnesota, U.S.
- Key people: Beth Ford (president & CEO)
- Products: Dairy foods, animal nutrition, seed and crop protection
- Revenue: $16 billion (2024)
- Members: 2,580 member-owners (2024)
- Number of employees: 9,000
- Website: landolakesinc.com

Land O'Lakes, Inc. is an American member-owned agricultural cooperative based in the Minneapolis–Saint Paul suburb of Arden Hills, Minnesota, United States, focusing on the dairy industry. The cooperative has 1,959 direct producer-members, 751 member-cooperatives, and about 9,000 employees who process and distribute products for about 300,000 agricultural producers, handling 12 billion pounds of milk annually. It is ranked third on the National Cooperative Bank Co-op 100 list of mutuals and cooperatives.

The co-op is one of the largest producers of butter and cheese in the United States through its dairy foods business; serves producers, animal owners and their families through more than 4,700 local cooperatives, independent dealers and other large retailers through its Purina Animal Nutrition (Purina Mills) business; and delivers seed, crop protection products, agricultural services and agronomic insights to 1,300 locally owned and operated cooperative and independent agricultural retailers and their grower customers through its WinField United business.

== History ==
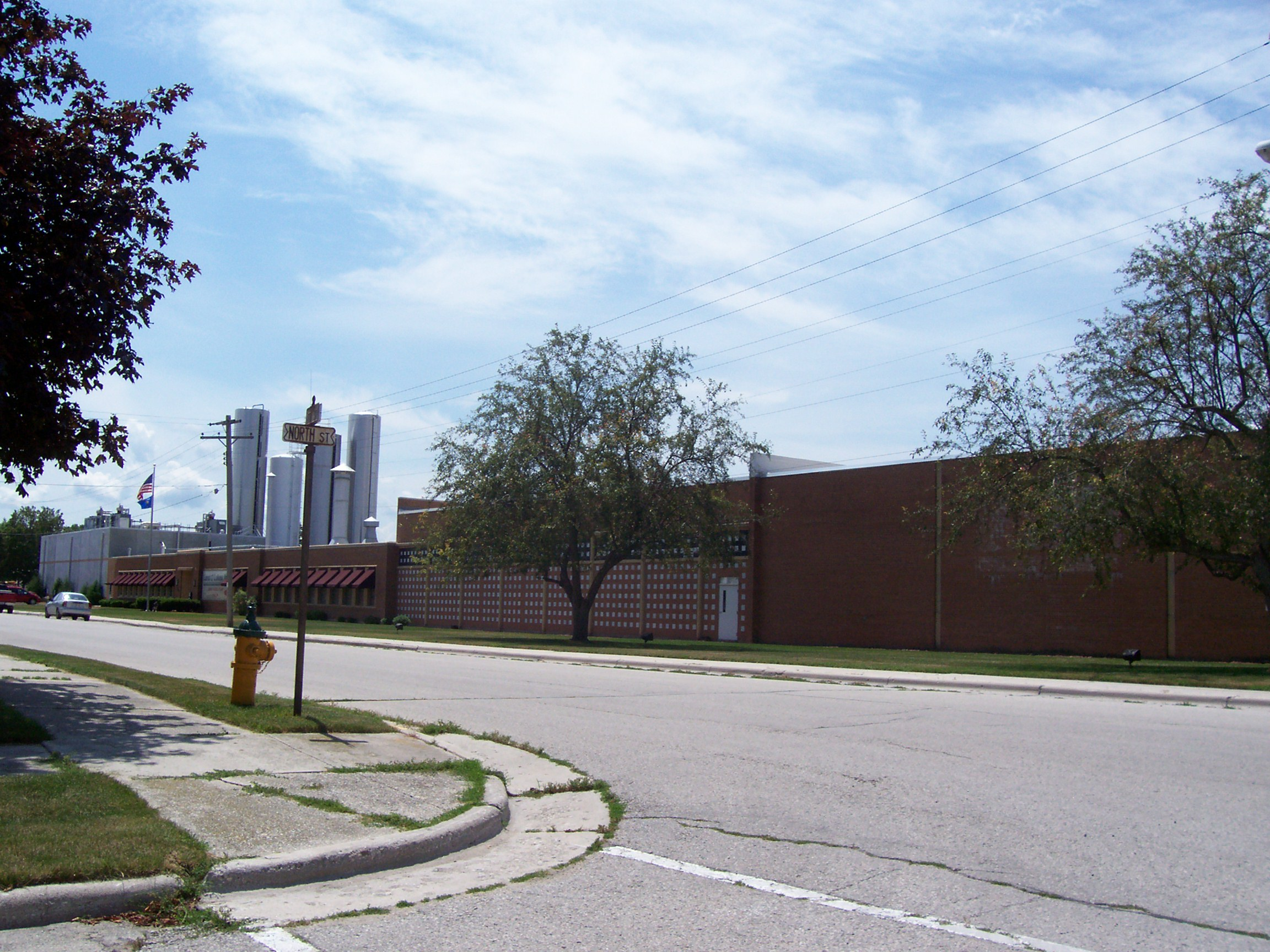
Processing plant in Kiel, Wisconsin

Land O'Lakes was founded on July 8, 1921, in Saint Paul, Minnesota, by representatives from 320 cooperative creameries as the Minnesota Cooperative Creameries Association. This organization aimed to improve the marketing practices and quality of butter, and thus increase the profitability of dairying.

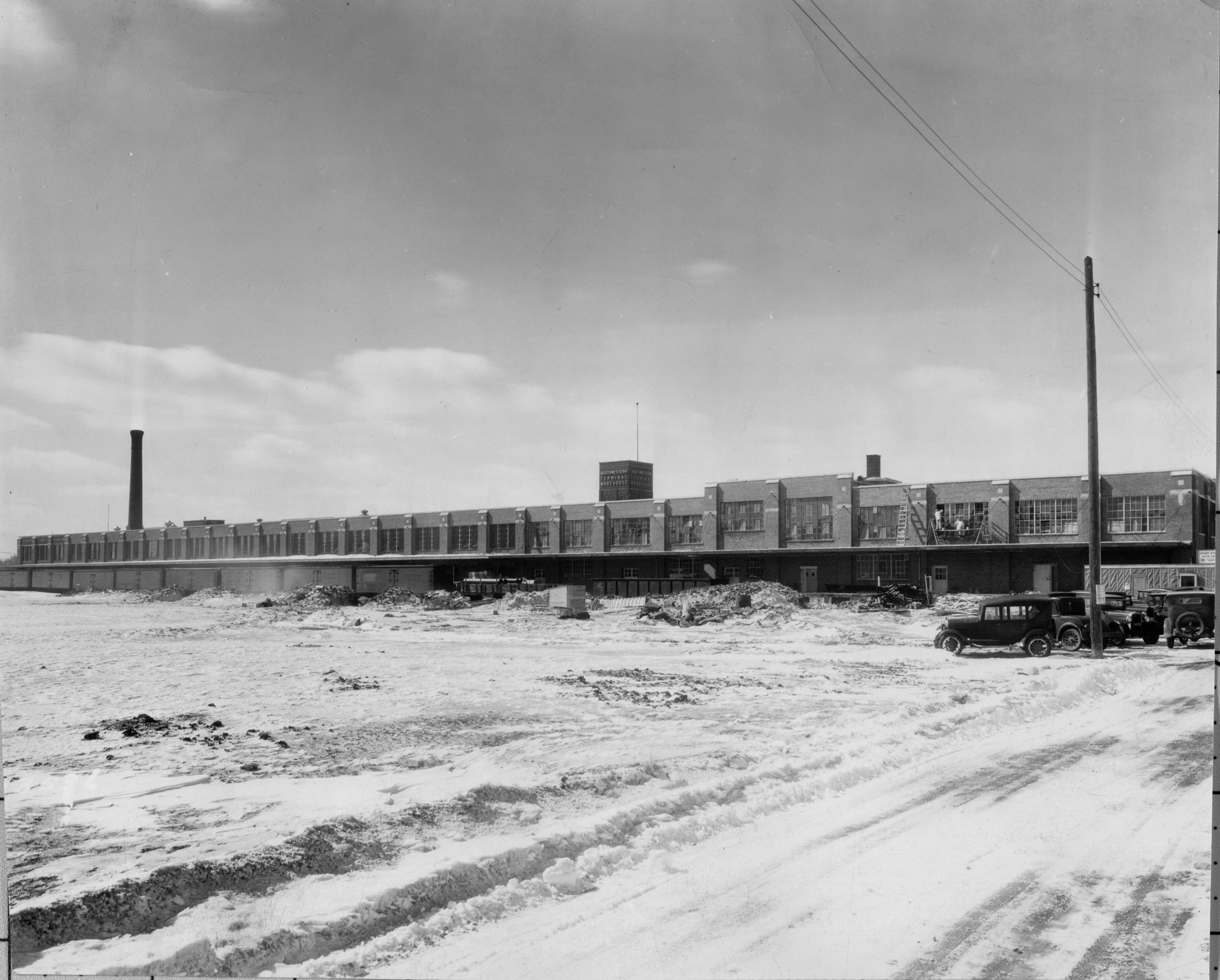
Land O'Lakes Creamery in Minneapolis, Minnesota, 1923

The Association developed and implemented a systematic inspection, grading and certification system of butter from member creameries, resulting in greater uniformity of product. The improved quality and uniformity, and the reliability of its grading system, were touted in advertising materials. In 1924, the uniformly graded sweet cream butter was given the name "Land O'Lakes" after a contest, and the certificate forms used by the Association included the "Land O Lakes" marketing name (Minnesota's state nickname is "Land of 10,000 Lakes").

The name became popular enough that the organization's public identity was often confused with its product name; thus, in 1926, the organization itself adopted the name "Land O'Lakes Creameries, Inc." and became eponymous with its product.

The co-op was often accused of unfair competition and false advertising in its early years, and was compelled to defend its inspection and certification processes. Eventually, however, the sweet butter marketing strategy drove competitors either to match the quality of butter produced under the Land O'Lakes name or see their sales decline. Many competitors in the dairy products business copied the Land O'Lakes approach, and the certification of quality became a proven marketing technique in other product lines as well. In the 1960s and 1970s, Land O'Lakes and Lake to Lake (which later merged into Land O'Lakes) had a rivalry with the National Farmers Organization over the practice of withholding milk from market. One member was expelled from Lake to Lake for recruiting other farmers into NFO.

The trademark Land O'Lakes was first registered by Oconomowoc Canning Company in 1924, a Wisconsin company that produced canned vegetables under that name since 1920. As the dairy company grew they sought to gain control of the trademark, and in 1963 initiated a federal suit. The vegetable company prevailed in court, and the case set a legal precedent regarding the doctrine of "naked licensing".

=== Recent history ===
The Land O'Lakes co-op has grown through numerous acquisitions, and now has a large business in farm supply in addition to dairy: In 1978, Land O'Lakes got into the meatpacking business with the purchase of Spencer Beef. It sold Spencer Beef in 1983 to Excel, now Cargill Meat Solutions. In 1999, Land O'Lakes took an ownership stake in egg producer MoArk; it took full ownership of the company in 2006. In 2001, it paid $360 million – and assumed $130 million in debt – to take over animal feed producer Purina Mills, once part of Ralston Purina. Purina Mills' new owner planned to merge the company with its Land O'Lakes Farmland Feed division but would keep the Purina name and logo.

A federal court in 2002 ordered Land O'Lakes to pay $3 million for patent infringement to Dr William Pordy, the inventor of a type of dairy creamer. An appeal court later overturned that ruling. In August 2012, Land O'Lakes purchased refrigerated desserts manufacturer Kozy Shack Enterprises for an undisclosed sum.

In June 2016, Land O'Lakes acquired the Thousand Oaks, California–based biofuels firm Ceres, Inc. In July 2018, Land O'Lakes named Beth Ford as its first female CEO. Ford's role became effective August 1. At the time, she was the third openly gay woman CEO to run a Fortune 500 company. In December 2019, Land O'Lakes used autonomous truck technology developed by Plus.ai to successfully complete the first cross-country, commercial freight run by a self-driving truck.

In 2020, the company started the American Connection Project along with Microsoft, Tractor Supply Co., and the Mayo Clinic to set up free wifi locations during the COVID-19 pandemic.

== Corporate affairs ==
The company's headquarters is in Arden Hills, Minnesota, in suburban Minneapolis-St. Paul.

=== Dairy foods ===
- Land O Lakes (the apostrophe is sometimes removed in product branding) licensed to Dean Foods
- Alpine Lace
- Land O'Lakes Food Service
- Kozy Shack
- Vermont Creamery

=== Animal feed ===
- Purina Animal Nutrition
- Mazuri
- Land O'Lakes Feed

=== Seed/crop protection ===
- WinField United (merged with United Suppliers in October 2015)

== Butter packaging and controversy ==
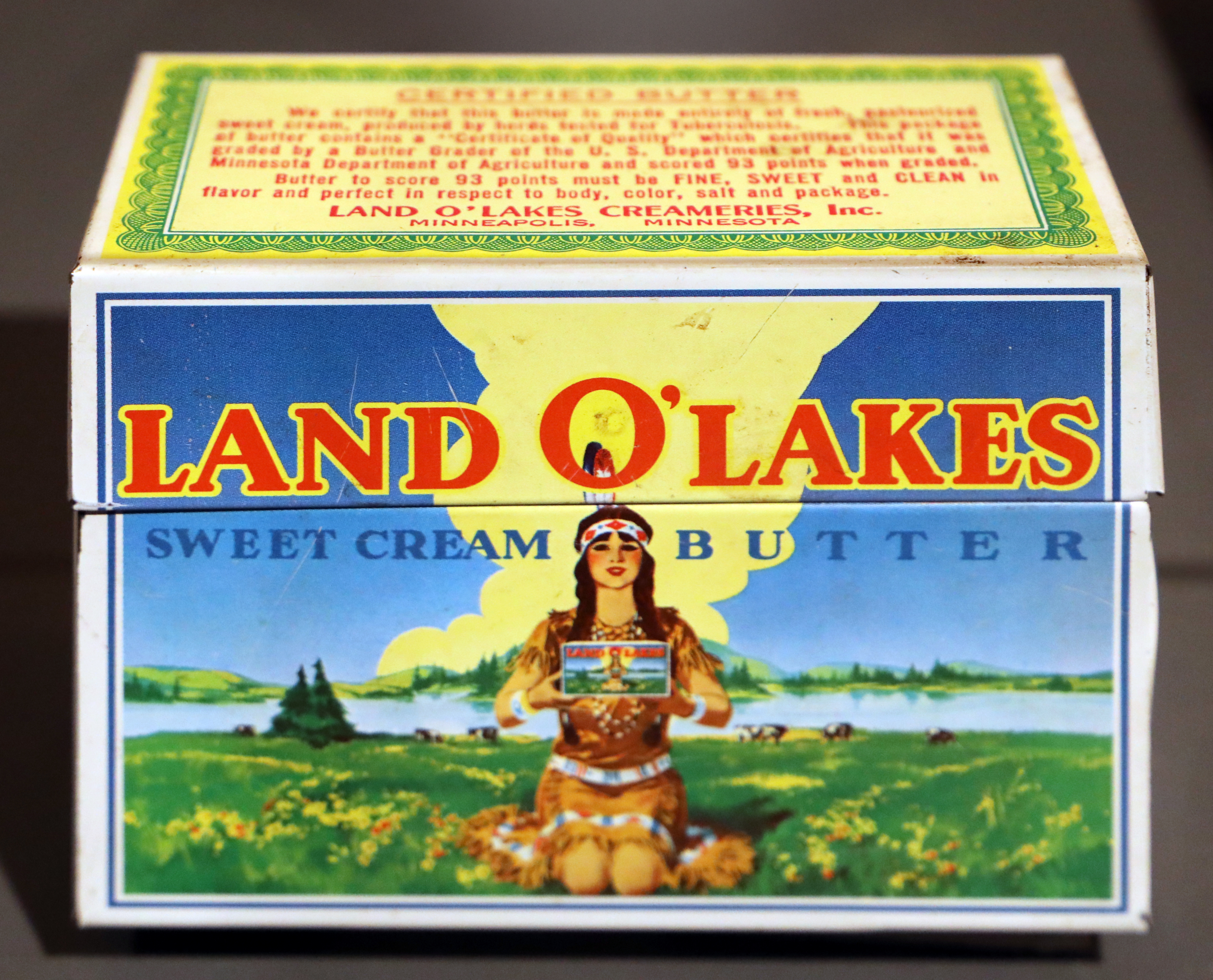
The recursive image long shown on the Land O'Lakes butter packaging (here in a 1928 ad) is an example of the Droste effect.

The Land O'Lakes Indigenous woman, named Mia, holding the butter box was painted in 1928 by Brown & Bigelow illustrator Arthur C. Hanson. According to Land O'Lakes, the original image of Mia was "simplified and modernized" in 1939 by Jess Betlach and has undergone many minor modifications since as the enduring logo of the co-op. Red Lake Ojibwe artist Patrick DesJarlait updated Mia's image in the 1950s. DesJarlait publicly believed in fostering an open dialogue between Native Americans and non-Natives. Thus, Mia's clothes were changed to match specific Ojibwe styles, and the background became a specific location in the Ojibwe territory, the Red Lake in Minnesota. The original image is an example of the infinite-loop motif or Droste effect, in which the image is repeated, in theory infinitely, within itself.

In 2018, the image was changed to depict only the head of the Native woman (doing away with the Droste effect). In February 2020, the company announced that after 92 years, it was removing the image of the Native American woman. The use of a Native woman as a mascot had been criticized as a stereotype of the Indian princess, and the decision to change the label was praised by some Native advocates such as Peggy Flanagan, Lieutenant Governor of Minnesota and a citizen of the White Earth Band of Ojibwe. However, the move was not without controversy within the Native community.

DesJarlait's son, Robert DesJarlait (Red Lake Ojibwe), disagreed with claims that the logo was offensive or stereotypical. "Basically, it was giving the previous generation a sense of almost empowerment to see a Native woman on a box of butter. It gave them a sense of cultural pride," he said. "After seeing those posts, I said, 'that's right, that's why my dad created this image to begin with.'"

== Allegations of animal mistreatment by supplier ==
In September 2009, People for the Ethical Treatment of Animals (PETA) released an undercover video allegedly depicting animal abuse of dairy cows at a Pennsylvania supplier for Land O'Lakes, Inc. The video showed unclean conditions in the barn and milking parlor, along with cows showing signs of infections and illness. The supplier's employee was found not guilty of animal cruelty charges resulting from this incident and an investigation by veterinarians hired by Land O'Lakes revealed no mistreatment of animals, but the veterinarians suggested that bedding, hygiene, ventilation and animal disposal practices be improved. Land O'Lakes states that it is supportive of the dairy industry's National Dairy F.A.R.M.: Farmers Assuring Responsible Management (FARM) animal care standards.

In May 2017, the animal rights organization Animal Outlook (formerly Compassion Over Killing) released undercover footage of cruelty to animals at DFA supplier Mason Dixon Farms, which documented "cows being kicked in the face, punched in their sensitive udders, excessively shocked with an electric prod, jabbed with a pens or elbows, and having their tails twisted or bent by workers." The footage resulted in the firing of one employee.

== Licensing ==
Since August 2012, WhiteWave Foods has licensed the Land O'Lakes name and sold coffee creamers and fluid dairy products under the brand.

Land O'Lakes brand milk is licensed to Dean Foods in Montana, North Dakota, South Dakota, Nebraska, Minnesota, Iowa, and Wisconsin.

== In popular culture ==
- In Gary Shteyngart's 2010 satirical novel Super Sad True Love Story, Land O'Lakes has merged with two major auto companies to become a major consolidated corporation, Land O'Lakes GMFord.
- In December 2019, an autonomous truck drove itself from Tulare, California to Quakertown, Pennsylvania in a period of three days carrying a load of 40,000 pounds of Land O'Lakes butter.

== See also ==
- List of dairy product companies in the United States

== General bibliography ==
- Land O'Lakes Corporate Website
- Kenneth D. Ruble. Men to Remember: How 100,000 Neighbors Made History. (Lakeside Press, 1947), a company-sponsored history of the early years of Land O' Lakes (1921–1945). See especially pp. 163–167 and 181–184, concerning the evolution of the name of the product into the company name.
- Truman Torgerson. Building markets and people cooperatively: the Lake to Lake story. published by Land O'Lakes, Inc., Lake to Lake Division – Technology & Engineering – 352 pages, 1990. See especially page 151 to 160, which details conflict with the National Farmers Organization.
