= Puppy chow (snack) =

Homemade candy made in the United States

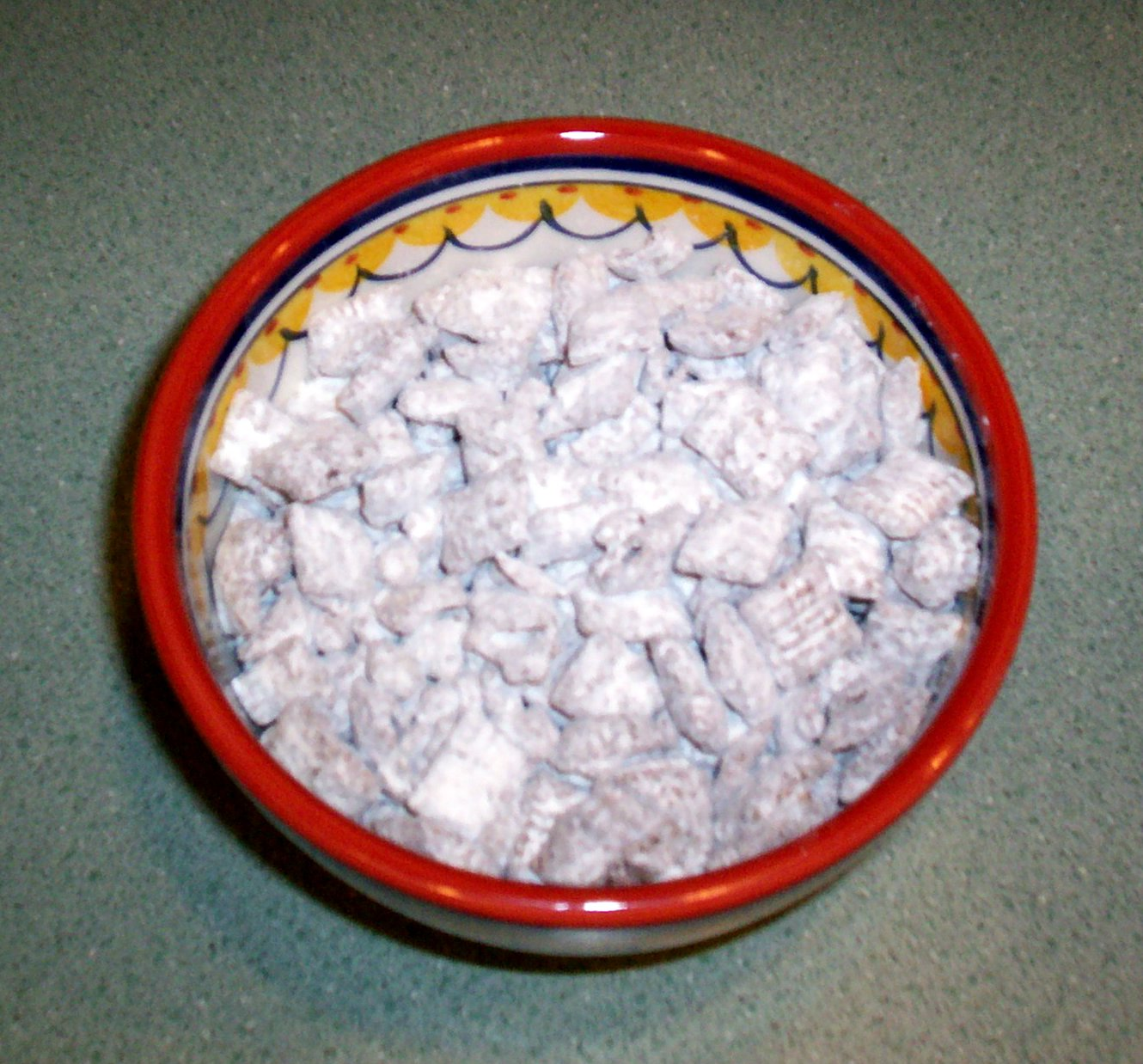
- Alternative names: Monkey Munch, Muddy Buddies, Muddy Munch, Reindeer Chow, Doggy Bag, Silly Buddies
- Course: Candy
- Place of origin: United States
- Main ingredients: Chocolate, peanut butter, cereal, powdered sugar
- Food energy (per serving): 20 kcal (84 kJ)

Puppy chow, also known as monkey munch, muddy buddies, muddy munch, reindeer chow, or doggy bag, is the name for a homemade candy made in the United States, primarily in the Midwest. The recipe's name and ingredients can differ depending on the version, but most recipes will typically include cereal, melted chocolate, peanut butter (or other nut butters), and powdered sugar. Nut free versions can be made using nut butter alternatives, such as sunflower butter. Corn, wheat, or rice cereal can be used, usually Chex and/or Crispix.

== Structure ==
Each piece of puppy chow forms around a single square of Chex or Crispix. These are coated with a mixture of melted chocolate and peanut butter. The mixture sticks readily to the textured surface of the breakfast cereal, but its high viscosity means it cannot typically fill the interior. This allows the treat to remain crunchy, as each square's interior lattice remains dry. The coated squares are then tossed in powdered sugar to form an additional layer. The candy is allowed to cool. The final exterior feels dry to the touch, but the chocolate and peanut butter quickly melt when it is eaten. The resulting candy can be stored at room temperature and is often transported in the same large zipper storage bags that are used to toss it in powdered sugar.

== Consumption ==
Puppy chow can be eaten with a spoon or by hand, as the outer coating of powdered sugar provides a barrier to keep any melted chocolate and peanut butter from sticking to the fingers. It is served in much the same way as M&Ms or mixed nuts: diners scoop a portion from a communal bowl, then eat it from a small dish. Because the powdered sugar coating readily soaks up liquids, it is rarely served on the same plate as other foods. Puppy chow is typically served as an hors d'oeuvre or light dessert.

== Availability ==
This candy is often made during special events, such as holidays. It is a popular candy to make for children and adults alike.

General Mills has made their own version of the candy, which they began selling under the name of Chex Mix Muddy Buddies in 2010, and it has been popular under that name in certain parts of the country since at least the 1980s.
