= Ralstonism =

American pseudoscientific social movement

Ralstonism was a social movement founded by Webster Edgerly that promoted his pseudoscientific ideas of personal and racial hygiene. It began as the Ralston Health Club, which published Edgerly's writings. It was a hierarchical organization where members were ranked according to the number of "degrees" they had, which ranged from 0 to 100. Members gained in the hierarchy by purchasing and studying Ralston's books, each of which taught five degrees. Edgerly at first published his ideas under the pseudonym Everett Ralston, but later used his own name and explained "Ralston" as an acronym for "Regime, Activity, Light, Strength, Temperation, Oxygen, Nature"

Edgerly saw his followers as the founding members of a new race, based on Caucasians, and free from "impurities". He advocated the castration of all "anti-racial" (non-Caucasian) males at birth.

Edgerly wrote 82 of what would today be called self-help books under the pseudonym Edmund Shaftesbury. They covered subjects including diet, exercise, punctuation, sexual magnetism, artistic deep breathing, facial expressions, and ventriloquism. Although Edgerly publicly claimed that the Ralston Company had no goods for sale, he did sell his books through mail order.

In addition to advice like toothbrushing, the books make various recommendations: for example, every young man should engage in a form of probationary marriage with a woman old enough to be his grandmother. Edgerly also created his own language, called the Adam-Man-Tongue, with a 33-letter alphabet.

The Magnetism Club of America, another Ralstonite organization, was founded to give its members mind control.

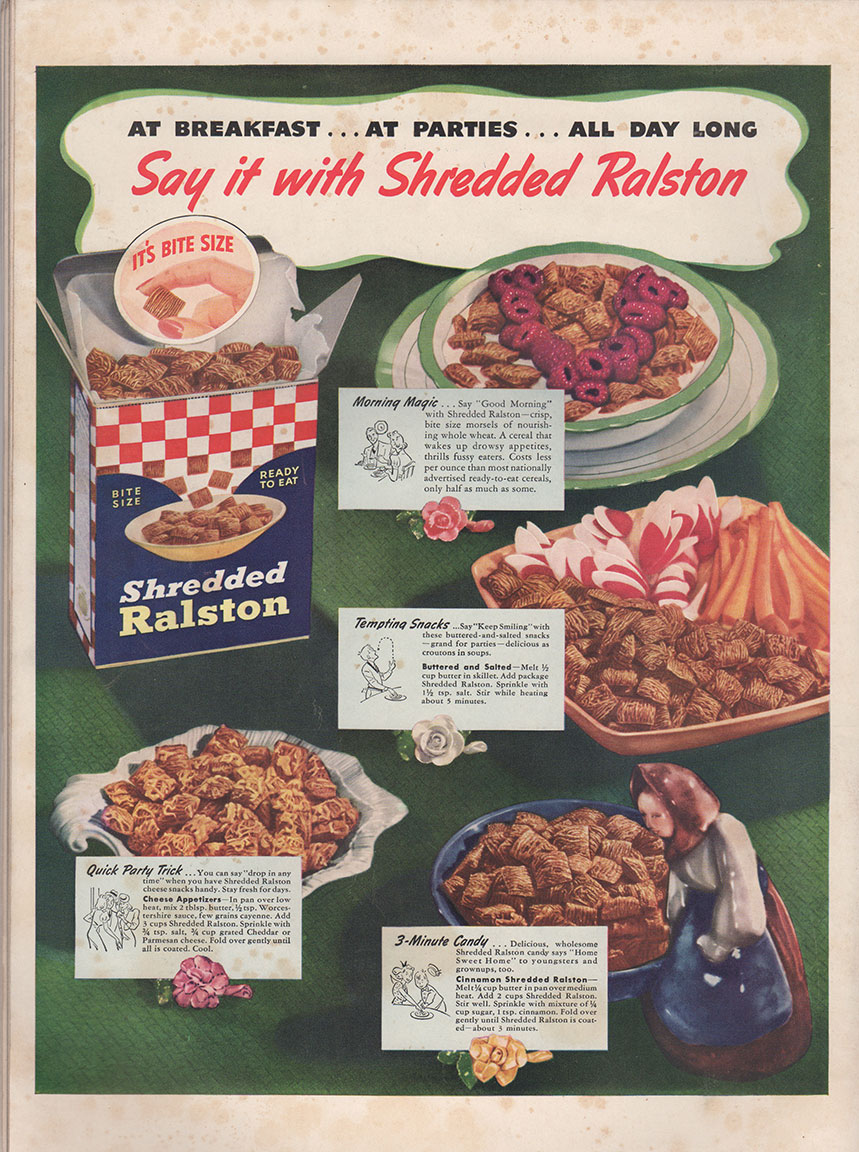
Shredded Ralston advertisement, 1942

Ralstonites were to follow strict dietary guidelines. For example, watermelons were supposed to be poisonous to Caucasians. Correct diet and proper physical exercise would help readers attain personal magnetism, which would give them control over the thoughts of others. Much of the physical regime demanded moving in graceful curves and arcs and walking exclusively on the balls of one's feet. Because sudden starts and stops and sharp angular movements caused a "leakage of vital force", Ralstonites were to even pick marbles in continuous circles. There was a proper way to bathe (dry bath), gesture, sit, stand, sleep, talk, and have sex.

In 1900, Edgerly joined forces with the founder of Purina Food Company, which took the name Ralston Purina Company (which would later become Nestlé Purina PetCare). It made whole wheat cereal that Ralstonites were to consume. The food company Edgerly founded evolved into what is now called Ralcorp which was the original manufacturer of cereal brands including Chex and Cookie Crisp.

Between 1894 and 1895, Edgerly bought large areas of farmland along the northern slope of Hopewell Valley, New Jersey, where he founded Ralston Heights in 1905. A house he designed was built to contain a community of Ralstonites he meant to be a core of a future City of Ralston. The contours of the estate followed Edgerly's conviction that sudden stops and walking in straight lines would cause leakage of vital force. Edgerly planned to expand to hundreds of lots, sixteen small farms, seven palaces and a Temple of Ralston. This community did not materialize, at least not in the form Edgerly intended. Much of the estate still exists, albeit in ruined condition.
