= Dog Chow =

Dog food brand

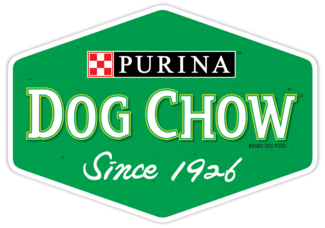
- Product type: Dog Food
- Current owner: Nestlé Purina PetCare
- Produced by: Nestlé Purina PetCare
- Country: Worldwide
- Introduced: 1926
- Website: https://www.purina.com/dog-chow

Dog Chow is a brand of dog food marketed and manufactured by Nestlé Purina PetCare. Dog Chow was first introduced in 1926, and has since expanded its brand offerings to include a wider selection products for dogs with the addition of food for puppies, elderly dogs, and dogs needing a weight maintenance formula as well as offering other types of pet food, including Puppy Chow, Cat Chow, and Kitten Chow.

== Products ==
Over the years, Dog Chow has expanded its product line to cater to the varying needs of dogs at different life stages and with specific dietary requirements.

In addition to the original Dog Chow formula, the brand now includes:

Puppy Chow: Formulated for puppies to support their growth and development.

Senior Chow: Tailored for older dogs with age-related nutritional needs.

Healthy Weight Formula: Designed for dogs that require weight management.

High-Performance Chow: Created for active dogs needing higher energy levels.

The brand has also extended its offerings to include pet foods for other animals, such as Cat Chow and Kitten Chow.

Due to the brand's growing popularity, a string of commercials were aired in Canada in 1962. The commercials introduced Jim Henson's brainchild, Rowlf the Dog.
