= William H. Danforth =

American businessman (1870–1955)

- Born: September 10, 1870; Charleston, Missouri, U.S.
- Died: December 24, 1955 (aged 85); St. Louis, Missouri, U.S.
- Education: Washington University in St. Louis
- Occupations: Founder, Ralston Purina
- Spouse: Adda Bush (m. 1894-death)

William H. Danforth (September 10, 1870 – December 24, 1955) was an American businessman known for founding Ralston Purina in St. Louis, Missouri in 1894. He was a co-founder of the American Youth Foundation (AYF) and the author of the book, I Dare You!.

== Early life and education ==
Danforth was raised in Charleston, Missouri. He graduated from Washington University in St. Louis.

== Career ==
Ralston's checkerboard logo evolved from a personal development concept Danforth put forth in his book I Dare You! (1931), in which he used a checkerboard to explain it. Danforth proposed that four key components in life need to be in balance. In the illustration, "Physical" was on the left, "Mental" on top, "Social" on the right and "Religious" on the bottom. To be healthy, you needed the four squares to stay in balance and one area was not to develop at expense of the other. The concept became intertwined with the company in 1921 when it began selling feed that was pressed in cubes called "checkers." The Christian Science Monitor named I Dare You! as one of the top 10 self-help books of all time.

Through the Danforth Foundation, he subsidized the construction of 24 Danforth Chapels on college campuses around the United States, and one in Japan. Berea College, which Danforth attended, has one of them. It is part of the Draper Building. The outer wall contains stones from Danforth's personal collection, obtained from various locations of historic importance.

== Personal life ==
Danforth's son was Donald Danforth, a former chief executive of the company. His grandsons include former U.S. Senator John Danforth and former Washington University chancellor William "Bill" H. Danforth.
