= History of first-person shooters =

Video game genre history

The history of first-person shooters encompassed the genre's roots as simulated space action and shooter games in the late 20th century, further refined through new innovations in the following years such as more advanced 3D technology, narrative story-telling, popularity of console gaming, and online capabilities. First-person shooter is one of the most popular and highest-selling genres in video games, and its evolution not only influenced its games, but also titles from other genres.

== Origins: 1970s–1980s ==
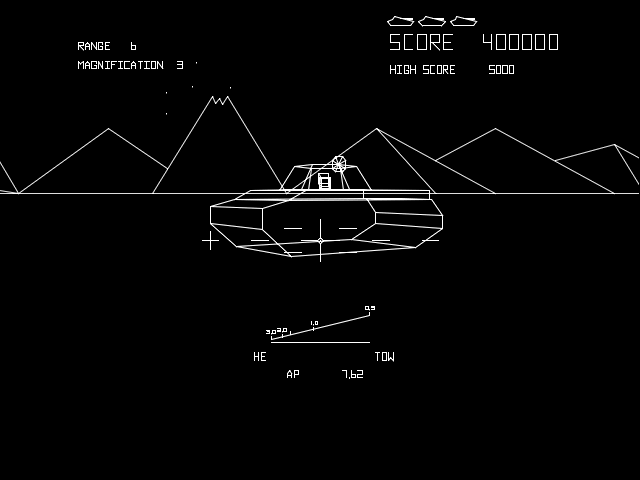
Before the popularity of first-person shooters, the first-person viewpoint was used in vehicle simulation games such as Battlezone.

The earliest two documented first-person shooter video games are Maze War and Spasim. Maze War was originally developed in 1973 by Greg Thompson, Steve Colley and Howard Palmer, high-school students in a NASA work-study program trying to develop a program to help visualize fluid dynamics for spacecraft designs. The work became a maze game presented to the player in the first-person, and later included support for a second player and the ability to shoot the other player to win the game. Thompson took the game's code with him to Massachusetts Institute of Technology, where with help from Dave Lebling to create an eight-player version that could be played over ARPANET, computer-run players using artificial intelligence, customizable maps, online scoreboards and a spectator mode. Spasim had a documented debut at the University of Illinois in 1974 on the PLATO mainframe system. The game was a rudimentary space flight simulator for up to 32 players, featuring a first-person perspective. Both games were distinct from modern first-person shooters, involving simple tile-based movement where the player could only move from square to square and turn in 90-degree increments. Such games spawned others that used similar visuals to display the player as part of a maze (such as Akalabeth: World of Doom in 1979), and were loosely called "rat's eye view" games, since they gave the appearance of a rat running through a maze. Another crucial early game that influenced first-person shooters was Wayout. It featured the player trying to escape a maze, using ray casting to render the environment, simulating visually how each wall segment would be rendered relative to the player's position and facing angle. This allowed more freeform movement compared to the grid-based and cardinal Maze War and Spasim.

A slightly more sophisticated first-person shooting mainframe game was Panther (1975), a tank simulator for the PLATO system. Atari's first-person tank shooter arcade video game Battlezone (1980), modeled closely after PLATO Panther, was released for arcades and presented using a vector graphics display, with the game designed by Ed Rotberg. It is considered to be the first successful first-person shooter video game, making it a milestone for the genre. It was primarily inspired by Atari's top-down arcade shooter game Tank (1974). The original arcade cabinet also employed a periscope viewfinder similar to submarine shooting arcade games such as Midway's video game Sea Wolf (1976) and Sega's electro-mechanical game Periscope (1966). Battlezone became the first successful mass-market game featuring a first-person viewpoint and wireframe 3D graphics, with a version later released for home computers in 1983.

== Early first-person shooters: 1987–1992 ==
MIDI Maze, a first-person shooter released in 1987 for the Atari ST, featured maze-based gameplay and character designs similar to Pac-Man, but displayed in a first-person perspective. Later ported to various systems—including the Game Boy and Super NES under the title Faceball 2000—it featured the first network multiplayer deathmatches, using a MIDI interface. Despite the inconvenience of connecting numerous machines together, it gained a cult following; 1UP.com called it the "first multi-player 3D shooter on a mainstream system" and the first "major LAN action game". In 1986, MacroMind released a version of the game for the Apple Macintosh titled Maze Wars+, which was playable on the AppleTalk local network by up to 30 players. The game featured five different character avatars, including an eyeball similar to that found in the Xerox version of the game, four different types of robot players, additional maze features such as teleporters, and walls made of lines rather than blocks.

Id Software's Hovertank 3D pioneered ray casting technology in May 1991 to enable faster gameplay than 1980s vehicle simulators, though it was preceded by 3 years by the FPS The Colony in doing so and Catacomb 3-D introduced another advance, texture mapping, in November 1991. The second game to use texture mapping was Ultima Underworld: The Stygian Abyss, a March 1992 action role-playing game by Looking Glass Technologies that featured a first-person viewpoint and an advanced graphics engine. In October 1990, id developer John Romero learned about texture mapping from a phone call to Paul Neurath. Romero described the texture mapping technique to id programmer John Carmack, who remarked, "I can do that.", and would feel motivated by Looking Glass's example to do the same in Catacomb 3-D. Catacomb 3-D also introduced the display of the protagonist's hand and weapon (in this case, magical spells) on the screen, whereas previously aspects of the player's avatar were not visible. The experience of developing Ultima Underworld would make it possible for Looking Glass to create the Thief and System Shock series years later.

== Rise in popularity: 1992–1993 ==
Wolfenstein 3D was the first episodic FPS game developed by id Software, as a successor to the successful 1980s 2D infiltration video-games Castle Wolfenstein and Beyond Castle Wolfenstein from Muse Software, and published by Apogee Software on 5 May 1992. These were games in which the player had to explore mazes while battling Nazis to find keys required to unlock doors to reach each floor's exit - all while searching every wall for secret areas filled with treasures for a higher score until each episode's last floor's boss. It was an instant success, fueled by its first episode's distribution and spread as shareware, with the second and the third available after registration, and the three last prequel episodes available as a separate mission pack. The game was popular enough that it has since been credited with single-handedly popularizing the concept of first-person-shooter as a genre of video-games. It was built on John Carmack's ray casting technology already experimented into id's previous games Hovertank One and Catacomb 3D to create a new standard for first-person-shooter video-games widely emulated, improved, and still applied to this day. Tom Hall originally designed it to be a first-person infiltration game including stealth, hiding dead bodies, disguises and alarms, following the legacy of its predecessors. The game engine does include these original features; however John Romero and John Carmack wanted a simple shooter, and Hall had to fight hard to even include the secret areas. Despite its violent themes, Wolfenstein largely escaped the controversy generated by the later Doom, although it was banned from Germany due to the use of Nazi iconography which is a sensitive topic there, where Wolfenstein has been forbidden until 2022. Further, Nintendo's anti-violence policy required id Software to remove blood, gore, and all Nazi iconography as well as replace the enemy attack dogs with giant rats to allow it to be released on SNES. id Software released a map editor to let players create and share online their own home-made maps for the game, which started the players' modding communities, which further blossomed with Doom. During Doom's development, id Software quickly developed a short extension for Wolfenstein 3D titled Spear of Destiny released on 19 September 1992 to tease the players with the Hell to come in Doom as Spear of Destiny concluded into Hell, then two years later, Doom 2 included two secret levels featuring Wolfenstein in Hell while re-using Spear of Destiny's Hell final level's music to close the loop.

Ken Silverman decided to develop his own game engine after he played Wolfenstein 3D in 1992. His first game, that he named Walken as in "Ken's Walking simulator", was close to Wolf3D engine. Then he improved his game with his friend Andrew Cotter, added narration to each floor, renamed it Ken's Labyrinth, and released it on Internet as shareware under his brother's company Advanced Systems on 1 January 1993. The game was about escaping a bizarre dream labyrinth full of people shooting projectiles at the player while projectiles were more balls than bullets, meaning they had limited range and were slow enough to dodge them as opposite to Wolfenstein 3D whose weapons were hitscan firearms, some walls reflected projectiles, killed enemies vanished without any death animation nor remnant body on the floor, and Ken himself voiced the protagonist and filled his game with pictures of himself which hurt the player if they dared to shoot them, which made his game personal. Epic MegaGames, then Wolfenstein 3D's publisher Apogee Software's main competitor, noticed it, saw potential, then signed a commercial agreement with Ken's father, as Ken was still minor. However, the original Advanced Systems' Ken's Labyrinth was made from Ken and Andrew's limited resources to the point that Ken made the sound effects with his mouth, therefore Epic MegaGames made use of their resources to revamp the game, replaced the projectiles balls with bubble gum balls, starbursts which bounced off walls, and homing missiles, while collecting more of the same weapon increased their range and collecting thunderbolts increased the range of all weapons at once, also replaced the original final boss with Ken himself, added diverse monsters, temporary power-ups such as reflecting enemies' projectiles, kill enemies on contact, and invincibility, as well as treasures for buying these power-ups from vending-machines and for paying doors' toll, slot-machines to win coins instead of finding treasures in secret areas, death-traps such as holes in floors which were the only way to get rid of some invulnerable enemies, water fountains which slowly restored health (much like in Duke Nukem 3D three years later), changed the goal from the original's merely escaping the labyrinth to rescue the player's abducted dog Sparky and save the world, added the requirement to have Sparky follow the player to the exit of each floor to be able to reach the next floor, which made the player have to pay attention to another character beside their own, and commercialized Ken's Labyrinth v2 still as shareware on 21 March 1993. All versions of Ken's Labyrinth got to be source-ported many times and even onto Nintendo Switch by a fan. As soon as id Software showed off some previews of Doom in the middle of its development, Ken Silverman started to develop his own game engine to rival with John Carmack once again, used a thesaurus to search synonyms for the word "construction", and named his new game engine "Build". Apogee Software wanted Build since id Software went their own way and did not want to license their new Doom engine (yet). Both Epic MegaGames and Apogee Software attempted to contract Ken Silverman who chose Apogee Software which he never explained his reasons however Epic Games expressed no regret since not relying on Ken Silverman motivated them to develop their own technologies, which paid off.

Most shooters in this period were developed for IBM PC compatible computers. On the Macintosh side, Bungie released its first shooter, Pathways into Darkness in August 1993, which featured more adventure and narrative elements alongside first-person shooter gameplay. Pathways had been inspired by Wolfenstein 3D, and born out of an attempt to take their previous top-down dungeon exploration game Minotaur: The Labyrinths of Crete into a 3D setting. ShadowCaster, developed by Raven Software and published by Origin Systems on 27 October 1993, used a heavily modified version of Wolf3D engine made by John Carmack during summer 1992 who offered it to Raven Software after he was impressed with their first RPVG Black Crypt because he was curious about how Raven would use his game engine to make a RPVG instead of a FPSG. ShadowCaster was the first commercial game released with classic "2.5D Doom engine" improvements such as distance fogging, non-orthogonal walls, textured ceilings and floors, etc. before Doom itself came out. It introduced some RPG elements into a FPS game engine as well as a customizable HUD, an auto-map, jumping, swimming, flying, shapeshifting with each metamorphosis featuring its own characteristics to adapt to each situation.

Apogee Software, the publisher of Wolfenstein 3D, followed up its success and released another FPS game based on its engine titled Blake Stone: Aliens of Gold from another developer Jam Productions 5 December 1993 which featured a sci-fi setting about a British secret agent named Blake Stone pursuing a mad scientist through his facilities like a sci-fi James Bond, a similar Wolf3D's gameplay of exploring mazes while battling various foes to find keycards required to unlock doors to reach each floor's exit all while searching every wall for secret areas filled with treasures for a higher score until each episode's last floor's boss but with a far wider diversity of enemies, and added textured floors and ceilings, switches to find and to press to open new areas, traps, an auto-map, stats tracking, a grenade launcher, limited-use vending-machines, teleporters, enemies spawners, back-tracking to previous levels as well as some friendly NPCs in the form of scientists who would give the player hints and supplies provided the player did not kill them. The game was initially received generally positive reviews but sales rapidly declined in the wake of the success of id's Doom, released a week later. It still got a sequel Blake Stone: Planet Strike on 28 October 1994 which integrated the auto-map into the HUD as a rotating mini-map which revealed secret doors at the cost of consuming auto-mapper charges and added some enemies who camouflaged into the environment or were cloaked to surprise the player though.

== Advances in 3D engines: 1993–1997 ==
Doom, released on 10 December 1993, refined Wolfenstein 3D's template by adding support for higher resolution, improved textures, variations in height (e.g., stairs and platforms the player's character could climb upon), more intricate level design (Wolfenstein 3D was limited to a grid based system where walls had to be orthogonal to each other, whereas Doom allowed for any inclination) and rudimentary illumination effects such as flickering lights and areas of darkness, creating a more complex 3D environment. Doom allowed competitive matches between multiple players, termed "deathmatches", and the game was responsible for the word's subsequent entry into the video gaming lexicon. According to creator John Romero, the game's deathmatch concept was inspired by the competitive multiplayer of fighting games such as Street Fighter II and Fatal Fury. Doom became so popular that its multiplayer features began to cause problems for companies whose networks were used to play the game, causing frequent bandwidth reductions. Multiplayer gaming, which is now integral to the first-person shooter genre, was first successfully achieved on a large scale by Doom. While its combination of gory violence, dark humor and hellish imagery garnered acclaim from critics, these attributes also generated criticism from religious groups and censorship committees, with many commentators labelling the game a "murder simulator". There was further controversy when it emerged that the perpetrators of the Columbine High School massacre were fans of the game; the families of several victims later unsuccessfully attempted to sue numerous video game companies - among them id Software - whose work the families claimed inspired the massacre. John Carmack explained how he designed his Doom engine to Ken Silverman that he considered his only equal which inspired Ken who was in the process of developing his Build engine.

Doom has been considered the most important first-person shooter ever made, to the point that in the 90s, other first-person shooters released after it were often called "Doom clones". CyClones was an early post-Doom FPS by Raven Software, releasing a year after Doom in November 1994. During development the company split into two groups: One worked with id's new Doom engine to create Mage, a fantasy action game, which would eventually evolve into the game Heretic. The other team worked on CyClones. The game initially reused the ShadowCaster engine, but early into development the team found that they wanted to do more with the engine than they had done before. A new, 100% in-house engine was created that could handle moving platforms, catwalks, sloped areas, and transparent textures. The engine, by Carl Stika, was nicknamed STEAM. The game included full-motion video sequences. CyClones allowed the player to use the mouse to aim without moving, unlike other FPS games from the time which bound the mouse to both aiming and moving simultaneously, with no turning. It also included vertical aiming, jumping, various missions objectives as well as one of the first training modes in a FPS game.

Apogee Software's Rise of the Triad: Dark War, released on 21 December 1994, began as a sequel to Wolfenstein 3D, but was soon altered and became a stand-alone game. The game included "ludicrous" gibs, bullet holes persisted, and sheets of glass could be shattered by shooting or running through them. Bungie Software released the sci-fi FPS game Marathon on 21 December 1994 exclusively on Mac, which streamlined concepts from their previous game Pathways Into Darkness by eliminating role-playing elements in favor of the shooter action spurred by Doom's success. Marathon was highly successful, leading to two sequels Marathon 2: Durandal released on 24 November 1995 then Marathon: Infinity released on 15 October 1996 to form the Marathon Trilogy, and becoming the standard for FPS games on Mac which pioneered or was an early adopter of several new gameplay features such as default freelook, ammo clips and weapons reloading though not manually, forcing the player to keep an eye on their ammo clips to anticipate the next reloading, dual-wielded and dual-function weapons, a motion sensor to detect both enemies and allies in the area, gravity alterations, swimming, interactive environments such as healing stations, oxygen stations, save points, teleporters, many computer terminals spread all around the levels as plot devices which provided messages, informations, various objectives and maps to the player's character as well as friendly defense drones and non-player characters (NPCs), versatile multiplayer modes (such as King of the Hill, Kill the Man with the Ball, and cooperative campaign) and a map editor for players to create and share their own maps for the games. The Marathon games also had a strong emphasis on storytelling in addition to the action, which revolved around evolving relationships between the human player's character and some AIs during a surprise invasion and subsequent war against a hostile alien Empire which already conquered and enslaved some other alien species, much like Bungie's future projects such as the Halo and Destiny series which took a lot from the Marathon trilogy, which is no more exclusive to Mac since Bungie Software open-sourced it in 2000 then released the original trilogy as freeware in 2005, some fans have source-ported it to Windows and Linux as well as remastered them using the open-source engine Aleph One and have even been developing many new scenarios, total conversions, and multiplayer maps sustaining a still active community. Many sci-fi games both from Bungie themselves and from other studios have cited the Marathon trilogy as a huge influence on their stories and settings such as the series Halo, Destiny, Mass Effect and Warframe.

After having provided a modified Wolfenstein 3D engine to Raven Software for ShadowCaster and being impressed by the final result, id Software requested that Raven develop a medieval-themed/dark fantasy game using a modified version of id's Doom engine. Raven considered themselves as typical D&D fans and initially drafted the game with role-playing elements. They then took instruction from id programmer John Carmack to simply "do it like Doom, and add the fantasy flavor." Raven Software then used and upgraded the Doom engine and released Heretic on 23 December 1994 which introduced larger maps, vertical aiming, flying, gibs, randomized ambient sound effects, interactive environments such as rushing water and winds which push the player along, an inventory system to store and select many different items which range from health potions to the "morph ovum" which transforms enemies into chickens and one of the most notable item that can be found is the "Tome of Power" which acts as a secondary firing mode for certain weapons, resulting in a much more powerful projectile for each weapon, some of which change the look of the projectile entirely, then Raven added two more episodes and re-released it as Heretic: Shadow of the Serpent Riders on 31 March 1996.

Star Wars: Dark Forces was released on 6 February 1995 after LucasArts decided Star Wars would make appropriate material for a game in the style of Doom. However, Star Wars: Dark Forces improved on several technical features that Doom lacked, such as the ability to crouch, jump, or look and aim up and down. Dark Forces also was one of the first games to incorporate 3D-designed objects rendered into the game's 2.5D graphics engine. The game's success launched the Star Wars: Jedi Knight series, beginning with the direct sequel Star Wars Jedi Knight: Dark Forces II. Descent released by Parallax Software on 17 March 1995, a game in which the player pilots a spacecraft around caves and factory ducts, was among the earliest truly three-dimensional first-person shooters. It abandoned sprites and ray casting in favour of polygonal models and allowed movement through all of the six possible degrees of freedom. On 28 April 1995, the Japanese company Exact released the successor to Geograph Seal for the PlayStation console, called Jumping Flash!, which placed more emphasis on its platform elements. Raven Software upgraded the Doom engine further and released Hexen: Beyond Heretic on 30 October 1995 which added jumping, more immersive environments with effects such as swirling leaves or scattering bats upon the player's approach, weather effects, some destructible objects, scripted environmental changes such as earthquakes, different character classes to allow different playstyles as well as interconnected maps through hub maps instead of the standard linear succession of maps which granted a taste of open-world in a FPS game. Apogee Software, then renamed 3D Realms, followed up with Duke Nukem 3D (sequel to the earlier platformers Duke Nukem and Duke Nukem II), released as shareware on 29 January 1996, which ran on the then new Build engine developed by Ken Silverman with the support of John Carmack. Duke Nukem 3D won acclaim for its humour based around stereotyped machismo as well as its adrenalinic gameplay and graphics. However, some found the game's (and later the whole series') treatment of women to be derogatory and tasteless.

Shortly after the release of Duke Nukem 3D, id Software released the much anticipated Quake on 22 June 1996. Like Doom, Quake was influential and genre-defining, featuring fast-paced, gory gameplay, within a completely 3D game environment, and making use of real-time rendered polygonal models instead of sprites. It was centered on online gaming and featured multiple match types still found in first-person shooter games today. It was the first FPS game to gain a cult following of player clans (although the concept had existed previously in MechWarrior 2's Netmech, with its Battletech lore as well as amongst MUD players), and would inspire popular LAN parties and events such as QuakeCon. The game's popularity and use of 3D polygonal graphics also helped to expand the growing market for video card hardware; and the additional support and encouragement for game modifications attracted players who wanted to tinker with the game and create their own modules. According to creator John Romero, Quake's 3D world was inspired by the 3D fighting game Virtua Fighter. Quake was also intended to expand the genre with Virtua Fighter influenced melee brawling, but this element was eventually scrapped from the final game.

== Online and console games: 1997–2010s ==
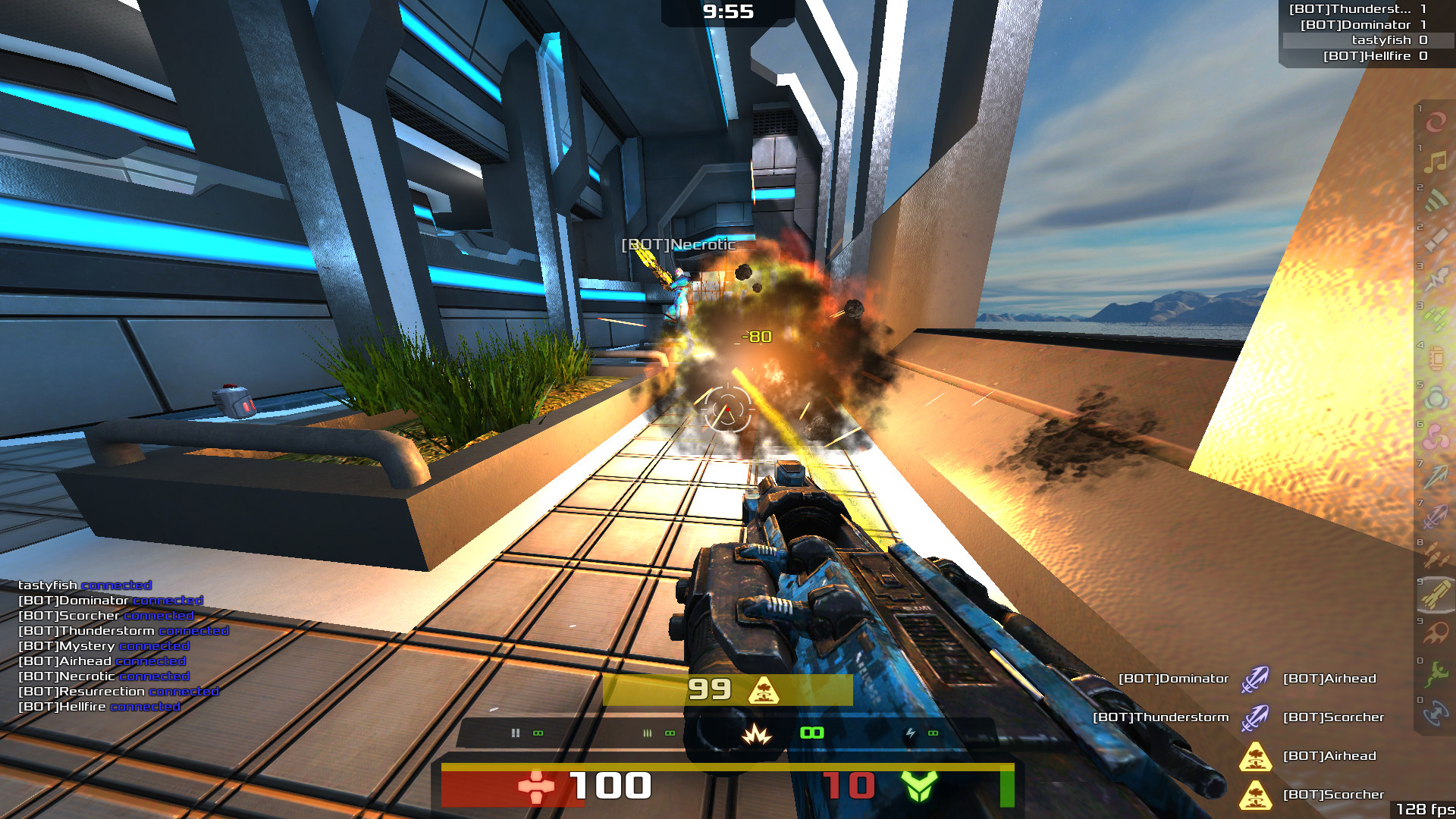
2011 shooter Xonotic

Based on the James Bond film, Rare's GoldenEye 007 was released in 1997, and as of 2004 it was still the best-selling Nintendo 64 game in the United States. It has been the first landmark first-person shooter for console gamers and was highly acclaimed for its atmospheric single-player campaign and well designed multiplayer maps. It featured a sniper rifle, the ability to perform head-shots, and the incorporation of stealth elements (all of these aspects were also included in the game's spiritual sequel, Perfect Dark) as well as some Virtua Cop-inspired features such as weapon reloading, position-dependent hit reaction animations, penalties for killing innocents, and a newly designed aiming system that allowed players to aim at a precise spot on the screen.

Valve's Half-Life was released in 1998, based upon Quake's graphics technology. Initially met with only mild anticipation, it went on to become a commercial success. While most of the previous first-person shooters on the IBM PC platform had focused on visceral gameplay with relatively weak or irrelevant plots, Half-Life placed a far bigger focus on strong narrative; the game featured no cut scenes but remained in the first-person perspective at all times. It capitalized heavily on the concepts of non-enemy characters (previously featured in many other titles, such as the Marathon series and Strife) and wider in-game interactivity (as first introduced by the likes of Duke Nukem 3D and System Shock) but did not employ power-ups in the traditional sense, making for a somewhat more believable overall experience. The game was praised for its artificial intelligence, selection of weapons and attention to detail and "has since been recognized as one of the greatest games of all time" according to GameSpot. Its sequel, Half-Life 2, (released in 2004), was less influential though "arguably a more impressive game".

Starsiege: Tribes, also released in 1998, was a multiplayer online shooter allowing more than 32 players in a single match. It featured team-based gameplay with a variety of specialized roles, and an unusual jet pack feature. The game was highly popular and later imitated by many other titles such as the Battlefield series. Id's Quake III Arena and Epic's Unreal Tournament, both released in 1999, became the real milestones for multiplayer gaming, thanks to their incredible graphics and frenetic, yet accessible and perfectly balanced online modes; on the other hand, both games only featured a very limited single player campaign designed for a more "disposable" arcade approach. Counter-Strike was also released in 1999, a Half-Life modification with a counter-terrorism theme copied from Rainbow Six. The game and later version Counter-Strike: Source (2004) went on to become the most popular multiplayer game modification ever, with over 90,000 players competing online at any one time during its peak.

Medal of Honor, released in 1999, gave birth to a long-running proliferation of simulative first-person shooters set during World War II, leading to titles such as World War II Online, which became one of the first massive multiplayer online FPS games; Brothers in Arms: Road to Hill 30, which became one of the most well-known squad-based FPS titles; and Battlefield 1942, which became one of the first FPS games to feature large-scale warfare. Several developers from Medal of Honor would form Infinity Ward and develop another World War II shooter in 2003 entitled Call of Duty. This later became the first in what would become one of the largest and most successful first-person shooter series in video game history. World War II would remain the most popular setting for historical first-person shooters until the release of History Civil War: Secret Missions – a 2008 shooter set during the American Civil War – that influenced the use of other time periods and eras in the years following its release, paving the way for Darkest of Days, Betrayer, Verdun, and War of Rights.

At the E3 game show in 1999, Bungie unveiled a real-time strategy game called Halo; at the following E3, an overhauled third-person shooter version was displayed. In 2000, Bungie was bought by Microsoft. Halo was then revamped and released as a first-person shooter; it was one of the launch titles for the Xbox console. It was a runaway critical and commercial success, and is considered a premier console first-person shooter. It featured narrative and storyline reminiscent of Bungie's earlier Marathon series but now told largely through in-game dialog and cut scenes. It also received acclaim for its characters, both the protagonist, Master Chief and its alien antagonists. The sequel, Halo 2 (2004), brought the popularity of online gaming to the console market through the medium of Xbox Live, on which it was the most played game for almost two years. It was in Halo 2 when one of the most well-known gaming incidents that captured world wide attention occurred. From April to May, 2010, several Halo players and fans played multiplayer non-stop for nearly a month, in an attempt to delay the shutdown of Halo 2's servers.

Deus Ex, released by Ion Storm in 2000, featured a levelling system similar to that found in role-playing games; it also had multiple narratives depending on how the player completed missions and won acclaim for its serious, artistic style. Metroid Prime, released in 2002 for the GameCube, a highly praised first-person shooter, incorporated action adventure elements such as jumping puzzles and built on the Metroid series of 2D side-scrolling platform-adventures. Taking a "massive stride forward for first-person games", the game emphasized its adventure elements rather than shooting and was credited by journalist Chris Kohler with "breaking the genre free from the clutches of Doom". In 2003, PlanetSide allowed hundreds of players at once to compete in a persistent world, and was also promoted as the "world's first massively multiplayer online first person shooter." The Serious Sam series, first released in 2001, and Painkiller, released in 2004, both emphasized fighting waves of enemies in large open arenas, in an attempt to hearken back to the genre's roots.

=== New subgenres ===
Though not the first of its kind, Tom Clancy's Rainbow Six started a popular trend of tactical first-person shooters in 1998. It featured a team-based, realistic design and themes based around counter-terrorism, requiring missions to be planned before execution and in it, a single hit was sometimes enough to kill a character. In 2005, F.E.A.R. was acclaimed for successfully combining first-person shooter gameplay with a Japanese horror atmosphere. By that time, there became a slew of unique horror-themed first person shooters, most notably BioShock and Left 4 Dead; the former which was praised by some commentators as the best game of 2007 for its innovation in artistry, narrative and design, with game journalist Li C. Kuo calling it the "spiritual successor" to System Shock 2.

Team Fortress 2, originally a user-made mod for Quake but made into an official product by Valve by its release in 2007, launched a new type of team-based subgenre called hero shooters, which consist of first-person and third-person shooters where players selected from one of several pre-made characters with existing weapons and skill sets, using those different characters effectively to complete objectives against their opponents. The hero shooter genre had significant growth following the release of Overwatch in which refined the hero shooter formula by adding unique characters and larger narrative as they expanded the game in future updates. Also in 2007, Portal popularized the concept of puzzle mechanics in first-person perspective.

The Crytek games Far Cry (2004) and Crysis (2007) broke new ground by combining first-person shooter mechanics, sci-fi story-telling, and open-ended and sandbox-style level design. Additionally, Gearbox Software's Borderlands series popularized many gameplay elements that influenced the looter shooter genre. In the late 2010s, first-person and third-person shooters enjoyed a surge in popularity with the rise of battle royale games, in which many players battle for survival on a large map to be the last man or team standing through intense action-packed combat, and PlayerUnknown's Battlegrounds (2017) reached the highest number of concurrent players ever to be recorded on Steam. Its free-to-play mobile game version, PUBG Mobile (2018), reached over 1 billion downloads worldwide by early 2021 and grossed over $8 billion by early 2022.

== Rise of VR technology: 2020–present ==
As virtual reality (VR) technologies are being developed, FPS games are being developed right alongside the various VR gaming platforms. The new immersive 3D environments using VR headsets and motion controllers enable some entirely unique experiences and mechanics for FPS games, such as physically ducking / dodging, precise control for throwing objects, and individual finger control, enhancing the interactivity with in-game wearables and other objects in the environment. VR Games naturally have a greater focus on the players' spatial presence and the 3D environment itself rather than the actual challenge / competitiveness of the game, which also extends to first-person shooters, especially in the horror subgenre. Half-Life Alyx, released in 2020, is to date (2023) the highest grossing VR first-person shooter and is usually considered the first AAA title in VR. While there is much hype in the Virtual Reality arena, it is still an emerging technology, and it has yet to be determined if VR FPS titles will become mainstream competitive or how these platforms will influence the genre in the future.

== Evolution of FPS games in other systems ==
Efforts to develop early handheld video games with 3-D graphics have eventually led to the dawn of ambitious handheld first-person shooter games, starting with two Game Boy Advance ports of Back Track and Doom not long after the system was launched in 2001. The GBA eventually saw the release of several first-person shooter games specifically tailored for it, including Duke Nukem Advance, Ecks vs. Sever and Dark Arena, with a sizable amount of them being praised for pushing the hardware to the limit while providing satisfying gameplay. Despite their varying reception, they would demonstrate the viability of first-person shooters on handhelds, which became more apparent with new technological advances that accompanied future handheld systems.

The use of motion-detecting game controllers – particularly the Wii's – "promised to make FPS controls more approachable and precise with an interface as simple as literally pointing to aim" and thus "dramatically reshape the first-person shooter." However, technical difficulties pertinent to functions other than aiming – such as maneuvering or reloading – prevented their widespread use among first-person shooters. In 2007, peripheral developer Jason O. Johnson, of Split Fish Gameware, introduced a first of its kind, disruptive, Dual Mouse/Motion Nunchuck Combo controller series FragFx to improve accuracy of FPS gaming on consoles. The Pointman user interface combines a motion-sensitive gamepad, head tracker and sliding foot pedals to increase the precision and level of control over one's avatar in military first-person shooter games.
