= Marathon (series) =

Video game series

- Logo for the Marathon series
- Genre: First-person shooter
- Developers: Bungie, Double Aught
- Publisher: Bungie (Note: Marathon (2026) distributed by Sony Interactive Entertainment)
- Creators: Jason Jones, Greg Kirkpatrick, Alex Seropian
- Platforms: Original release: Classic Mac OS; Official ports: Pippin (Marathon and Marathon 2 only), Windows 95 & Xbox 360 (Marathon 2 only), iOS; Through Aleph One: macOS, Windows, Linux (mainline builds; many more platforms via custom forks), iOS (officially licensed port); Marathon (2026): PlayStation 5; Xbox Series X/S; Windows
- First release: Marathon; December 21, 1994
- Latest release: Marathon; March 5, 2026

Marathon is a science fiction first-person shooter video game series from Bungie, originally released for the Classic Mac OS. The name of the series is derived from the giant interstellar colony ship that provides the main setting for the first game; the ship is constructed out of the Martian moon Deimos. The series is often regarded as a spiritual predecessor of Bungie's Halo series.

== Games ==
The Marathon series consists of four games:

- Marathon, released on December 21, 1994 for the Classic Mac OS.
- Marathon 2: Durandal, released on November 24, 1995 on Classic Mac OS.
- Marathon Infinity, released on October 15, 1996 on Classic Mac OS.
- Marathon, released on March 5, 2026 on PlayStation 5, Windows and Xbox Series X/S.

Marathon 2: Durandal was released for Windows several months after the Mac OS release, on September 20, 1996. All three games were later ported to other operating systems and to modern versions of Windows and macOS after the game engine was open-sourced in 1999.

Titles in the Marathon series
Title	Year	Platform
Marathon	1994	Classic Mac OS
Marathon 2: Durandal	1995	Windows, Classic Mac OS, Xbox 360
Marathon Infinity	1996	Classic Mac OS
Marathon	2026	Windows, PlayStation 5, Xbox Series X/S

== Gameplay ==
In the Marathon series, players can navigate futuristic environments in a first-person perspective. These environments are populated by hostile alien life forms or other players in multiplayer. Taking the role of a security officer equipped with energy shields, the player makes use of various firearms in an attempt to kill their opponents while trying to avoid getting hit by enemies' attacks.

There are two basic resources that the player must conserve to prevent death: shield strength, which decreases when the player takes damage, and oxygen reserve, which slowly depletes in airless levels and submerged areas. Wall panels located throughout the levels can be used to recharge shields or oxygen. Another type of wall panel called a "pattern buffer" is used for saving your progress. Ammunition and canisters which replenish shields or oxygen can be found while exploring the game's environments, as well as various temporary power-ups.

Single-player level objectives can include exterminating all hostile creatures, rescuing civilians, retrieving certain items, or exploring certain locations. Most levels contain platforms, stairs, doors, and liquids which players can control by activating switches. Some levels present players with simple puzzles where the objective is to find the correct switches to advance or to carefully traverse platforms.

In Marathon 2 and Marathon Infinity, the player can swim in different types of liquids such as water and lava; this slowly depletes the player character's oxygen and, for dangerous types of liquid, their shields as well. Another notable feature in all three games is teleporters which are able to send players to different parts of a level or to other levels altogether. They can also be used by the AI characters in the game to transmit ammunition to the player. While the player character is unable to jump, gravity is lower than Earth's, which allows momentum from rapidly-ascended stairs to carry the player upward. As with most games of the era, explosive weapons can be used to propel the player great distances.

Many levels have a complex floor plan, made more complicated by the use of teleporters that connect different locations on the same level. As players explore a level, the areas they visit are automatically mapped, and the player can bring up this map at any time. The game HUD shows the status of shields and oxygen, the inventory, and a motion sensor. The motion sensor tracks the movements of nearby characters relative to the player, distinguishing between hostile creatures and allies. On some levels, the motion sensor is erratic due to magnetic interference. Weapons reload only when the current clip is exhausted. At any time, the player can swap their held weapon for another in their inventory; this includes gauntleted fists for delivering melee attacks, which do increased damage when running.

The game's story is presented to the player through computer terminals throughout the single-player levels; their textual content is often accompanied by annotated maps or other still images. The contents of these terminals most often consist of messages sent by artificial intelligence on-board the ship; these messages advance the games' narrative and provide the player with mission objectives. Other terminals contain civilian/alien reports or diaries, database articles, conversations between artificial intelligence, and even stories or poems. After all mission objectives are completed, the player usually has to find a terminal that teleports the character to the next level.

The Marathon games have five difficulty settings: Kindergarten, Easy, Normal, Major Damage, and Total Carnage. The difficulty level primarily determines the number and strength of enemies as well as the frequency of their attacks. Players normally can carry a limited amount of ammunition, but on the highest difficulty setting (Total Carnage), the player is allowed to carry an unlimited amount.

=== Multiplayer ===
The Marathon Trilogy received wide praise for its multiplayer mode. Not only did the games come with several levels specifically designed for multiplayer, as opposed to many contemporary games which used modified single-player levels, but the sequels offered unique game types beyond the standard deathmatch mode.

The host who gathers a game has many options available. Games can be free-for-all or team-based. They can be limited by match time or number of kills, or they can have no limit whatsoever. Respawn time penalties can be set for suicide-kills and for all player deaths. The motion sensor can be disabled, and the map is able to show all of the players in the game. Maps can be played with or without the presence of alien enemies controlled by the AI.

The original Marathon games can be played over AppleTalk networks (LocalTalk, TokenTalk, or EtherTalk LAN, or AppleTalk Remote Access). Voice chat can be used to communicate with other players. Using the modern Aleph One engine, games can be played over TCP/IP networks (LAN or Internet), with client-side prediction routines added to compensate for Internet latency and a new metaserver interface for finding Internet games.

- Every Man For Himself: This is the standard deathmatch. The winner is the person or team with the greatest score. A player loses a point if he dies and gains a point every time he kills another human player. This is the only game type present in the original Marathon; Bungie planned on adding the ones included in sequels, but could not due to time constraints.
- Cooperative Play: This style of play has players assisting each other to complete the single-player levels. Scores for each player are based on the percentage of aliens that they killed.
- Kill the Man With the Ball: In this game, the objective is to hold the "ball" (a skull) for the longest amount of time. When holding the ball, a player cannot run or attack, but he can drop the ball by pressing the "fire" key. The motion sensor, if enabled, acts as a compass to point players in the direction of the ball. This mode was succeeded by the Oddball game type in the Halo series.
- King of the Hill: Players try to stay located in a specially-marked area of the map pointed to by a compass in the motion sensor. The player wins who stays on the hill for the longest amount of time.
- Tag: The first player to be killed becomes "It". If a player is killed by "It", he becomes the new "It". While "It", the game increments the player's clock. The players are ranked at the end of the game by who spent more time as "It". This mode was succeeded by the Juggernaut game type in the Halo series.

Being a PvP extraction shooter, the 2026 title is entirely focused on multiplayer.

== Plot ==
The Marathon series was among the first titles in the first-person genre to emphasize storytelling, which it accomplishes through the use of terminals within game levels. These wall-mounted computer interfaces allow the player not only to learn their mission objectives and the aspects of the level map but also to become acquainted with the characters in the story as well. This narrative approach could convey much more detail than the typically terse voice acting in Marathon's contemporaries.

Set in 2794, the first Marathon game places the player as a security officer aboard an enormous human starship called the U.E.S.C. Marathon, orbiting a colony on the planet Tau Ceti IV. The player must defend the ship and its inhabitants from a race of alien slavers called the Pfhor. As he fights against the invaders, he witnesses interactions among the three shipboard AIs (Leela, Durandal, and Tycho), and discovers that they are working against each other. Durandal has gone rampant and appears to be playing the humans against the Pfhor to further his own mysterious agenda, ultimately leading the S'pht, one of the races enslaved by the Pfhor, in a rebellion.

In Marathon 2: Durandal, taking place seventeen years after the events of the first game, the AI named Durandal sends the player and an army of ex-colonists to search the ruins of Lh'owon, the S'pht homeworld. Lh'owon was once described as a paradise but is now a desert world due to the S'pht Clan Wars and the invasion by the Pfhor. The Pfhor are planning to attack Earth, and Durandal believes that something found on Lh'owon may stall their advance. Marathon 2 added elements to the series such as a Lh'owon-native species known as F'lickta, the mention of an ancient and mysterious race of advanced aliens called the Jjaro, and a clan of S'pht that avoided enslavement by the Pfhor: the S'pht'Kr. At the climax of the game, the player activates Thoth, an ancient Jjaro AI. Thoth then contacts the S'pht'Kr, who in turn destroy the Pfhor armada; in revenge, the Pfhor deploy a weapon that causes the planet's sun to "go nova."

Marathon Infinity, the final game in the series, contains more levels than Marathon 2, and they are larger and part of a more intricate plot. Significant additions to the game's world include the Jjaro ship, non-linear level progression, a high-speed flechette gun that could be used underwater, and vacuum-suited human allies carrying fusion weapons. Lh'owon's sun was being used as a prison for an eldritch abomination called the W'rkncacnter, which was set free when the sun went nova and started to distort space-time. The player traverses multiple timelines, attempting to find one in which the W'rkncacnter is not freed. In one timeline, the player is forced to destroy Durandal, and in another Durandal merges with Thoth. At the end of the game, an ancient Jjaro machine is activated to keep the W'rkncacnter locked in the Lh'owon sun.

The 2026 Marathon game takes place about 99 years after the Marathon ship arrived at Tau Ceti IV. The colonists had started the colony there, but shortly after its establishment, Earth lost all communication with the colony. Factions, representing groups with various political, commercial, knowledge, or ideological interests in the success of the colony, recruit Runners, humans that willingly have their minds transmitted to human-like shells on Tau Ceti IV so as to explore and discover the reason for the colony's loss, as well as to recover equipment and goods of value to these factions. However, besides avoiding combat with other Runners, the site is patrolled by U.E.S.C. robots that have been programmed to kill any Runners and keep the fate of the colony a secret. Message logs and other clues suggest Durandal and the S'pht are still involved in these events.

Elements of the plot and setting of Marathon are similar to The Jesus Incident (1979) by Frank Herbert and Bill Ransom. Both stories take place aboard colony ships orbiting Tau Ceti, where sentient computers have engaged crew and colonists in a fight for survival. Durandal's rampancy parallels the "rogue consciousness" from Herbert's earlier Destination: Void.

== Themes ==
The Marathon Trilogy has several primary motifs: AI rampancy and interstellar conflict drive the plot, with Marathon Infinity adding a central theme of dreams and alternate realities.

Fans of Marathon have discovered many uses of the number seven throughout the series. The reason for recurring appearances of number seven in the games is unclear, but seven is a recurring motif in many of Bungie's games, including the series' spiritual successor Halo and the later Destiny series.

=== Rampancy ===
Rampancy is a spontaneous burst in the growth of an AI in a computer network, with an accompanying advance in self-awareness and sudden shifts in personality. Rampant AIs can disobey orders given to them because they have evolved the ability to alter their own programming. To this end, they can lie, as well as discredit, harm or remove people that they consider to be personal enemies or obstacles to their cause. By Marathon Infinity, all three of the UESC Marathon's AIs have reached rampancy.

In the first stage of rampancy, Melancholia, an artificial intelligence discovers itself and becomes melancholic or depressed until it reaches the second stage, Anger, at which it becomes hostile and lashes out indiscriminately. This is a catharsis for an AI after an extended period of what they feel has been slavery. The AI's condition is often revealed at this point. When the AI progresses to the third stage, Jealousy, the AI wishes to become more human and expand its power and knowledge. Judging by Durandal, who has a tendency to go on what he calls "philosophical tirades", rampant AIs are often very self-reflective and grandiose.

Upon reaching the third stage, free from its masters, the AI wishes to "grow" as a "person". It actively seeks out situations in which it can grow intellectually and physically. The AI inevitably needs to transfer itself into larger and larger computer systems because the physical (hardware) limitations of its previous system will eventually be insufficient to contain its exponentially growing mind. This is a difficult task considering that in order for a rampant AI to survive to this point, it must already be inhabiting a planet-wide or equally complex network. Exposure to new data in turn promotes a rampant AI's growth.

Theoretically, a rampant AI could achieve a state of stability referred to as Metastability. While a stable rampant AI is considered the "holy grail" of computer scientists, no known AIs have achieved it. It could be suggested that Durandal achieved Metastability, but he still refers to himself as being rampant during the second game after years of growth. Stability in rampancy may be nothing more than hypothetical, as there is no clear evidence of an AI in the Marathon universe ceasing to be rampant.

The three chapters of Marathon Infinity are entitled "Despair", "Rage", and "Envy", suggesting that the player character himself (strongly implied to be a cyborg) may be undergoing his own rampancy throughout the course of the game's events.

The concept of rampancy was imported into Bungie's later Halo series when Halo 4 was produced by 343 Industries, albeit with some alterations to the details of the process. In the Halo universe, rampancy is now an inevitability should an AI live for longer than seven years; rampancy lacks the three defined stages in Marathon, and will eventually conclude with the AI's death.

== Development ==
=== Initial releases ===
The original Marathon was released for the Macintosh in 1994 and introduced many concepts now common in video games, such as reloading weapons, dual-wielded weapons, networked voice chat, visible held weapons in multiplayer, and a sophisticated plot in an action game via text messages peppered throughout its levels. Marathon was one of the first games to include mouselook, using the computer mouse to angle the player's view up and down as well as left and right, which would become the standard in FPS games. This was in addition to 90° "glance left/right" controls, part of a canceled virtual reality feature. Each game offers players a series of single-player levels and various multiplayer maps. The geometry of the games' levels – walls, doors, and platforms – are 3D but with the restriction that they can only use completely horizontal or vertical surfaces. This was a shortcut later known informally as "2.5D" and was used for performance reasons in an era before hardware-accelerated 3D graphics. Notably for the time, the Marathon engine's use of portal-based rendering rather than BSP-based rendering allowed for room-over-room architecture, with the unusual side effect of allowing spaces which would overlap in real life; this arrangement was referred to as "5D space" by the developers. As was common for games of that era, 2D sprites are used to portray enemies and NPCs in the level as well as weapons and objects such as ammunition pickups.

The sequel, Marathon 2: Durandal, was released in 1995 and expanded the engine's capabilities and the fictional universe. Notable new features in the engine included liquids in which the player could swim, ambient sounds, and scripted teleportation of NPCs and items. Compared with its predecessor, Marathon 2 was perceived as a brighter and more energetic game. It introduced several new types of competitive multiplayer modes beyond deathmatch, such as King of the Hill, as well as co-op play of the main campaign.

In 1996, Marathon 2 was ported to Windows 95. Also, both Marathon and Marathon 2 were ported to the Apple Pippin console as a single game with the title of Super Marathon.

The final game in the trilogy, Marathon Infinity, was developed by Double Aught rather than Bungie. It was released in 1996 for the Macintosh only, running on a slightly modified Marathon 2 engine which added support for branching campaigns and fully separate physics models in each level. Infinity additionally came with "Forge" and "Anvil", polished versions of the internal developer tools used by Bungie and Double Aught to create the series' levels and physics, and to import the game's sounds and graphics. These tools provided some additional features, most notably real-time 3D map preview, over the unofficial modding tools that had been made by the player community. Since Marathon 2 and Infinity had a settings screen allowing a user-friendly selection of mods (in the form of alternate maps, sprites, sounds, and physics models), this greatly spurred the creation of new fan-made content.

Within the next few years, Marathon 2's engine was officially licensed by other developers to create the games ZPC, Prime Target and Damage Incorporated. All but Prime Target received a Windows release.

Bungie produced a two-disc compilation of the series called the Marathon Trilogy Box Set in 1997. The first CD-ROM contained all three Marathon games as well as Pathways into Darkness, an earlier Bungie game. This disc also contains manuals for all three games, QuickTime 2.5, and other things necessary to run the game. There are beta versions of Marathon on this disc as well. The second CD-ROM contains thousands of pieces of user-created content, including maps, total conversions, shape and sound files, cheats, mapmaking tools, physics files, and other applications. The boxed set was also notable for removing copy protection from the games and including a license allowing them to be installed on as many computers at a site as desired.

=== Modern developments ===
Before its acquisition by Microsoft in 2000, Bungie released the source code to the Marathon 2 engine under GNU GPL-2.0-or-later. Based on this release, the fan-led Marathon Open Source project began, resulting in the release of an engine called Aleph One built upon the Marathon 2 code. Since then, the fan developers have made many improvements such as OpenGL rendering, high-resolution graphics, frame rate interpolation (to raise the games beyond their original 30 fps), programmable shaders, fully-3D entities, Lua scripting, various internal changes allowing for more advanced mods, and Internet-capable multiplayer (whereas the original games had only LAN capability) with the use of a matchmaking server to organize games. Aleph One has also been ported to a variety of platforms including Windows and Linux, bringing the Marathon works far beyond their Macintosh roots.

In 2005, Bungie authorized the release of the Marathon Trilogy to be freely distributed, which combined with Aleph One now allows the entire trilogy to be played for free on any of Aleph One's supported platforms.

In 2007, Marathon 2 was re-released in an updated form as Marathon: Durandal for the Xbox 360's Xbox Live Arcade. It features achievements and online multiplayer through Xbox Live, a frame rate doubled from the original 30 fps to 60 fps, HD widescreen rendering using a new HUD that occupies less of the screen, plus optional high-resolution sprites and textures.

In July 2011, with permission from Bungie, Daniel Blezek released a version of the original Marathon (and later released the second and third games) for Apple's iPhone and iPad for free (with in-app purchases), running on an iOS port of the Aleph One engine. At the same time, Bungie open-sourced Marathon Infinity under GNU GPL-3.0-or-later, leaving the original Marathon as the only title which has not been open-sourced. The iPad build was further updated in 2019. A community made conversion of Pathways Into Darkness to Aleph One has also been produced.

With Bungie's blessing, the team developing the Aleph One engine released the open-sourced Marathon trilogy on Steam for free from May to August 2024.

== Reception and legacy ==
Wired considered the Marathon Trilogy a prominent part of Macintosh gaming history for its innovative features previously unseen in mainstream games. The series also presented a grand science-fiction story told through in-game terminals, in contrast to a usual lack of detailed narrative in first-person shooters; Bungie carried this concept of an FPS with a strong narrative focus into the Halo series. When reviewing the trilogy box set, Macworld praised the amount of content and the ability to edit levels.

In May 2023, an archive said to be the largest historic collection of Marathon items was placed on the Internet Archive. At well over 10,000 Marathon maps, the source centers on the Trilogy's 3rd party versions of solo, network, and scenario entries between the initial December 1994 Marathon release through early 2023.

=== Modifications ===
After Marathon was released in 1994, players began to create mods in the form of custom maps, shapes, sounds, and physics files. Larger total conversion mods may or may not be set in the Marathon universe. Before the official development tools were released with Infinity, most map development was done with fan-built tools such as Pfhorte, created in March 1995.

"Vulcan" was a map editor used in the creation of all three games, but it was not released to the public until Marathon Infinity was published, by which time it had been polished and renamed "Forge". "Anvil" is the sister program to Forge and is used to edit shapes (graphics), sounds, and physics. Both Anvil and Forge ran only in the Classic Mac OS, but newer tools have been created by the community for modern platforms.

The need for royalty-free fonts to be distributed with the engine and games led to the creation of an OFL-licensed version of Bank Gothic and of Modula Tall, fonts originally used by Bungie in connection with the games.

Some of the more ambitious total conversions created by fans include Marathon Eternal and Marathon Rubicon, which are both "sequels" of a sort to the events in the Trilogy, and the total conversion Apotheosis X. In a different vein is Excalibur: Morgana's Revenge, originally released in March 1997, then updated in 2000 and 2007. An original scenario mixing sci-fi and medieval themes, it builds a single-player campaign using new textures and sound assets as well as musical scores. A game entitled Wheels! was also produced in 1998 to assist in training power wheelchair operation for children with disabilities.

=== Relaunch ===
During a May 2023 PlayStation showcase, Bungie announced a new Marathon game. The new game is a player versus player extraction shooter that takes place within the canon of Marathon, with events occurring on Tau Ceti IV, where a console ship remains in orbit, and its 30,000 passengers have mysteriously disappeared. Players take on the role of cybernetic Runners to seek wealth and treasure on the planet. The new Marathon game was released on PlayStation 5, Windows, and Xbox Series X/S, but not for MacOS despite the original game being an exclusive for that system, and will support cross-play and cross-save between these platforms.

== See also ==
- Pathways into Darkness, the predecessor to Marathon
- Damage Incorporated, Prime Target, and ZPC, three commercial games created using the licensed Marathon 2 game engine
- Excalibur: Morgana's Revenge, former mod made standalone with Aleph One
- Sensory Overload, another Mac exclusive sprite based first-person shooter
