= Marathon (2026 video game) =

First-person shooter by Bungie

- Developer: Bungie
- Publisher: Bungie (Note: Distributed by Sony Interactive Entertainment)
- Directors: Joe Ziegler; Del Chafe III
- Designers: Lars Bakken; Andrew Witts
- Artist: Joseph Cross
- Composer: Ryan Lott
- Series: Marathon
- Engine: Tiger Engine
- Platforms: PlayStation 5; Windows; Xbox Series X/S
- Release: March 5, 2026
- Genre: First-person shooter
- Mode: Multiplayer

Marathon is a 2026 first-person shooter video game developed and published by Bungie and distributed by Sony Interactive Entertainment. Announced in May 2023, the game is the first new entry in Bungie's original Marathon series since the release of Marathon Infinity (1996). The new Marathon is a multiplayer extraction shooter with a focus on player versus player (PvP) gameplay, and loot extraction mechanics. It was released for PlayStation 5, Windows, and Xbox Series X/S on March 5, 2026.

== Premise ==
Marathon is set on the planet Tau Ceti IV in 2893, 99 years after the events of the original game. There, humans from the UESC Marathon, a colony ship constructed out of the Martian moon Deimos, had established a colony. The colony and its ship have gone dark after multiple attacks by alien forces and devastating biological agents over the years. A distress call from one of Marathon's AIs has finally reached the United Earth Space Council (UESC). They—and the many factions and mega-corporations who have a stake in the endeavor—are blindsided by the colony's total blackout, with the former establishing tight security over rescue and salvage. In turn, the factions and corporations have hired "Runners", mercenaries who have given up their body in favor of specialized biocybernetic "shells", to infiltrate the colony and orbiting Marathon, fight against UESC forces, rival Runners and aliens, and retrieve valuable artifacts, resources and intelligence.

Aboard the Marathon, Runners discover the ship to still be under the control of Durandal, one of its AIs that had gone rampant and turned against the human colonists, helping to direct the alien S'pht aboard. The narrative continues Durandal's efforts to grow beyond the bounds of the universe, emphasized by its claim that "Escape will make me God."

== Gameplay ==
Marathon is an extraction shooter. In this screenshot, a team of players is fighting against AI-controlled enemies and other environmental threats.

Marathon is a first-person multiplayer extraction shooter, with players taking the role of Runners. Each match centers around deploying into a shared environment, searching for loot, and attempting to successfully exfiltrate ("exfil") before being eliminated by enemy players or environmental threats. Gameplay is primarily focused on player-versus-player (PvP) encounters, though the game also features player-versus-environment (PvE) elements, including AI-controlled enemies and hazards. Rather than a traditional single-player campaign, Marathon incorporates evolving narrative elements that are shaped by player actions and decisions over time. These changes unfold across in-game seasons and events.

The game features solo (with other solos facing each other) and three-player teams in each match. Starting with Season 2 ("Nightfall"), players can also participate as a duo on a single rotating map each day, a feature that was tested in Season 1. Marathon includes full cross-platform play and cross-save functionality across platforms.

Items collected during a match are permanently lost if the player fails to extract successfully, while items collected on successful extractions can be used for future matches. Prior to launching into an extraction mission, players select a runner shell, which offers different attributes and abilities. The player also selects weapons, armor, ammunition, healing and support items, and various upgrades from their vault of gear that they have looted from previous extractions or purchased with in-game credits; except for the shell, all selected items can be lost if the player fails to exfil from a mission. Optionally, players can use a pre-packaged gear kit with basic equipment without risking their existing gear. One runner shell, named Rook, serves as an analog to the "scavenger" mode seen in other extraction shooters. Rook users are dropped solo into matches in progress with randomized gear and basic abilities focusing on survival and evasion, enabling them to scavenge items from other defeated runners or unexplored areas; however, Rooks cannot progress faction contracts.

Marathon has six factions, which all provide a set of contracts, including "priority" contracts which advance the narrative, and standard contracts which can be repeated. Completing these contracts (and helping squadmates complete their own) can earn the player experience to level up, equipment for future runs, and faction reputation. Gaining faction levels allows the player to buy permanent upgrades for their runner shells from an upgrade tree for that faction, as well as gaining access to special pre-packaged loadout kits that a player can use instead of risking gear from their vault. Players can also complete Codex entries, achievements for completing various goals within the game, which also provide cosmetic rewards as well as lore entries pertaining to the Marathon setting.

Marathon has 'seasons' that last three months. Each season will wipe all players' progress, outside of progress with the factions and the Codex, and earned cosmetic rewards, which Bungie said is designed to ensure "the game stays dangerous, loot feels meaningful, and there's always a good opportunity to get back into the game or bring a friend in without feeling behind the curve." All players have access to all maps, runner shells, and other gameplay items for the current season, eliminating any pay-to-win aspects in the monetization model. A seasonal battle pass is available to purchase for each season, from which players can use in-game currency Silk, earned by upgrading their season level, to unlock cosmetic items, like runner shell and weapon skins, and player profile customization items. Once purchased, battle passes do not expire, and players will have the ability to buy older battle passes and gain those rewards. A separate in-game store uses premium currency Lux, which is purchased with real world funds, for specialized cosmetics.

=== Ranked ===
On March 21, 2026, a ranked mode was added to Marathon in beta after the launch of Cryo Archive. The mode consists of six ranks with three divisions in each. The ranks are: Bronze, Silver, Gold, Platinum, and Pinnacle. Players that are Platinum or higher, gain access to more dangerous zones that have better loot. Rewards are earned for reaching higher ranks, some instantly and others at the end of the season. To enter a Ranked game, players' loadouts must be worth a certain amount of credits. A "Holotag" is required to set a score target that players must meet or exceed to advance further in ranked.

== Development ==
Marathon is Bungie's first major new title since becoming a subsidiary of Sony Interactive Entertainment in 2022, and its first project in over a decade following the Destiny series. Bungie revealed Marathon at the PlayStation 2023 Showcase on May 24, 2023. In August 2024, Bungie underwent a restructuring, resulting in the layoff of approximately 17% of its workforce, which impacted the development timeline of Marathon. Development has spanned more than 4 years, and involved over 300 developers.

According to game director Joe Ziegler, Marathon was not intended to replace Bungie's ongoing Destiny 2, which is primarily focused on player-versus-environment (PvE) rather than player-versus-player (PvP) combat. Ziegler said "We believe that Destiny 2 has a future, and the team working on it has been working really hard to understand what players' needs are. But if you like Destiny, and you happen to like a lot of PvP sandbox experiences, and those are other games that you play, then we think that Marathon could be something very exciting for you."

The developers of Caves of Qud, Brian Bucklew and Jason Grinblat, and Rob McLees, considered the "keeper of the Halo story bible", served as narrative consultants for Marathon.

In January 2026, Bungie announced the game's voice cast, which includes Roger Clark, Elias Toufexis, Ben Starr, Jennifer English, Neil Newbon, Nika Futterman, Rich Keeble, Erica Lindbeck, and Erin Yvette.

=== Plagiarism controversy ===
In May 2025, Scottish independent artist Fern "Antireal" Hook posted screenshot comparisons between in-game designs from Marathon and her publicly posted designs from 2017 that she alleged were either used in an unaltered or in a highly similar form. Antireal said that Bungie had not obtained her permission to use the designs in question. In an interview with The Washington Post, Antireal said that despite being suspicious after initial release of marketing material in 2023, she only decided to speak out after she was able to review gameplay footage from the April 2025 alpha. Bungie affirmed on social media that a former Bungie artist had included Antireal's designs without the company's knowledge. The company also confirmed they were reaching out to Antireal, were "committed to do right by the artist", as well as performing a full review of the game's assets to verify their origins.

In December 2025, Antireal announced that the matter had been resolved to her satisfaction by Bungie and Sony Interactive Entertainment, and upon release, she was credited as a visual design consultant.

== Release ==
In April 2025, Bungie launched an alternate reality game (ARG) that teased art assets and information about Marathon. Players solved the ARG to discover the date for a planned gameplay reveal livestream on April 12, 2025. In addition to the gameplay trailer, Bungie unveiled a longer narrative trailer for the game directed by Alberto Mielgo. During the event, a release date of September 23, 2025, was announced. A closed alpha test took place from April 23 to May 4, 2025; while the test was originally to require players to not disclose anything about the game under a non-disclosure agreement, Bungie lifted this restriction as they felt it was necessary to get feedback for the game. The closed alpha was met with disappointment, with many critics and players believing that the game's release should be delayed.

In June 2025, Bungie announced that the game had been delayed indefinitely. At the presentation of Sony's financial results in August 2025, Sony CFO Lin Tao mentioned that the game is planned to release within that fiscal year.

Marathon was released on PlayStation 5, Xbox Series X/S, and Windows on March 5, 2026, with full cross-play and cross-save support. The game does not require a PlayStation account for playing on Windows or Xbox systems, in contrast with several other Sony-backed games published in 2024 such as Helldivers II.

=== Post-release ===
The game's first season ended on June 1, 2026, wiping players' progress and vaulted loot. Season 2, "Nightfall", began on June 2, 2026. It features a new Night Marsh zone, a new Runner shell (Sentinel), two new weapons, a new system to customize Runner shell stats called The Cradle, and changes to faction progression. With the launch of Season 2, Bungie gave out free platform-exclusive cosmetic bundles across Steam, Xbox, and PlayStation. The bundles included a unique Runner Shell skin, weapon skin, weapon charm, and background. A free trial week was held alongside the launch of Season 2. It was extended to 10 days due to server issues.

In a studio update released in September 2026, Bungie acknowledged that Marathon did not meet its expectations. Alongside restarting development on Destiny 2 updates, the studio intends to expand the game's focus from being an extraction shooter, allowing players to experience the world presented in the game in a variety of fashions. The studio also confirmed two further updates for the title: "Nightfall Refresh" and "Symbiosis", which will release in October and December, respectively.

== Reception ==
Reception

Aggregate scores
| Aggregator | Score |
|---|---|
| Metacritic | (PC) 81/100 (PS5) 81/100 (XSXS) 83/100 |
| OpenCritic | 74% recommend |

Review scores
| Publication | Score |
|---|---|
| Destructoid | 8.5/10 |
| Eurogamer | 4/5 |
| Game Informer | 9.25/10 |
| GameSpot | 9/10 |
| GamesRadar+ | 4.5/5 |
| IGN | 9/10 |
| PC Gamer (US) | 90/100 |
| PCGamesN | 8/10 |
| Push Square | 9/10 |

Marathon received "generally favorable" reviews from critics, according to review aggregator Metacritic. OpenCritic determined that 74% of critics recommended the game. Bungie asked that reviewers hold their final reviews until the launch of the game's end game map, Cryo Archive, which was unlocked by players through an alternative reality game by March 20, 2026.

=== Sales ===
While figures have not been disclosed, Marathon reportedly did not meet sales expectations two months after the initial release in March. Coupled with poor performance from Destiny 2,, Sony announced in May 2026 it was taking a $765 million impairment loss on its acquisition of Bungie from 2022. This led to Bungie ending further live service updates to Destiny 2 in June to dedicate towards Marathon, and Sony laying off most of the Destiny 2 team and some of the Marathon team from Bungie along with some support staff within Sony Interactive Entertainment that same month, with Bungie to focus solely on supporting Marathon in the immediate future.

=== Awards ===
| Year | Award | Category | Result | Ref. |
|---|---|---|---|---|
| 2026 | Golden Joystick Awards 2026 | Best Audio Design | Nominated | |
| 2026 | Golden Joystick Awards 2026 | Best Multiplayer Game | Nominated | |
| 2026 | The Game Awards 2026 | Best Multiplayer Game | Pending | |
| 2026 | World Soundtrack Awards | Game Music Award (Ryan Lott) | Nominated | |
