= Sensory Overload (video game) =

1994 video game

- Developer: Reality Bytes
- Publisher: Reality Bytes
- Designers: Jon Chiat; David Chiat; Jason Davis
- Platform: Macintosh
- Release: August 1994
- Genre: First-person shooter
- Mode: Single-player

Sensory Overload is a first-person shooter video game developed and published by Reality Bytes for the Macintosh.

== Gameplay ==
Sensory Overload is a game in which the player is a CIA agent who pretends to be a test subject to investigate a facility for medical research.

== Development and release ==
Sensory Overload was developed as the first game from Cambridge, Massachusetts-based studio Reality Bytes. It was co-designed by Jon Chiat, David Chiat, and Jason Davis. The game was released exclusively for Macintosh in August 1994. Reality Bytes would go on to create the polygon-based first-person shooters Havoc and Dark Vengeance.

== Reception ==
Reception

Review scores
Publication	Score
Computer Game Review	81%
Computer Gaming World	3/5
Next Generation	3/5
K	885/1000

Next Generation reviewed the game, rating it three stars out of five, and called it "definitely worth checking out." Peter Olafson of Electronic Entertainment summarized it as an "adequate action-adventure" not quite up to the level of Bungie's Marathon. He enjoyed its clever gadgets but felt they were underutilized and that the game was "slow and mechanical even on a Quadra" despite some acceleration for the Power Mac. Dave Rees of Gamers' Republic noted Sensory Overload as the first FPS to push the Mac's 32-bit hardware with a "representational style was far more advanced than anything previously seen" but that its "understated marketing" caused it to fall victim to the "superior effort" Marathon from Bungie.
