= Prime Target =

1996 video game

- Developer: WizardWorks
- Publisher: MacSoft
- Release: 1996
- Genre: First-person shooter

Prime Target is a 1996 action video game developed by WizardWorks Group and published by MacSoft for Macintosh computers.

== Gameplay ==
Prime Target uses the Marathon 2 gaming engine.

== Plot ==
An influential senator named Cathryn Mayfield has been murdered, and it is up to the player to uncover secret documents relating to a conspiracy.

== Development ==
The team was led by Kirk Sumner. An arcade port of the game was developed and underwent location testing at a Champions Arcade in the Philadelphia area during 1997, but was never fully released.

== Reception ==
The game received generally positive reviews from critics.

A Next Generation critic commented that the game's combination of shooting action and mystery solving "is a unique attempt to rework an old design, and for the most part it works." He also praised the large, challenging levels, the multiplayer options, and the need to move furniture and duck behind it for cover. However, he ultimately compared the game unfavorably to other Marathon 2 engine games such as ZPC and Damage Incorporated, and gave it three out of five stars. MacHome praised the game's realism and plot. MacGamer liked the replay value. MacGate appreciated how at the core of the game was a genuine mystery to solve. According to Italian company Mac-O-Rama, the title was the sixth entry on the 'Top Ten Mac Games List' for the period between January 31st and February 6th 2000.

Despite the reviews, the game saw mediocre sales upon release.
