= Havoc =

Havoc, Havocs, Havok, or Havock may also refer to:

== People with the name ==
- Havoc (musician) (born 1974), American rapper and record producer
- Johnny Devine (born 1974), Canadian professional wrestler who uses the ring name Havok
- Jimmy Havoc (born 1984), ring name of a British professional wrestler
- June Havoc (1912–2010), Canadian-American actress, vaudeville performer, and memoirist
- Mikey Havoc (born 1970), New Zealand media personality
- Davey Havok (born 1975), American rock vocalist
- Jessicka Havok (born 1986), American professional wrestler
- Havoc Pennington (born c. 1976), American computer engineer and entrepreneur
- Havoc, member of the West Coast rap group South Central Cartel

== Arts, entertainment, and media ==
=== Fictional characters ===
- Havoc, alias Carmine, a character in the Japanese anime television series Darker than Black
- General Havoc, a villain in the television series Power Rangers Turbo
- Jean Havoc, a character in the manga and anime series Fullmetal Alchemist
- Havok (character), a Marvel Comics superhero
- Lord Havok, a DC Comics supervillain
- Captain Nick "Havoc" Parker, a fictional character in the video game Command & Conquer: Renegade

=== Films ===
- Havoc (1925 film), an American film directed by Rowland V. Lee
- Havoc (1972 film), a German film directed by Peter Fleischmann
- Havoc (2005 film), a German-American film directed by Barbara Kopple
- Havoc (2025 film), a British-American film directed by Gareth Evans

=== Literature ===
- Havoc, a book by Ann Aguirre, 2014
- Havoc, a book by Jack Du Brul, 2006
- Havoc, a novel by the Danish writer Tom Kristensen, 1930
- Havoc, a book by E. Phillips Oppenheim, 1911
- Havoc, book 2 of the Malice series by Chris Wooding, 2010

=== Games and toys ===
- Havoc (video game), a 1995 first-person shooter
- Havoc, a wargame produced by Bluebird Toys
- H.A.V.O.C. (Heavy Articulated Vehicle Ordnance Carrier), a vehicle in the G.I. Joe: A Real American Hero toyline

=== Music ===
- Havoc (album), a 2016 album by Circus Maximus
- Havok (band), an American thrash metal band
- "Havoc", a song by Alanis Morissette from Havoc and Bright Lights (2012)

== Brands and enterprises ==
- Havoc, the online product name of methylepitiostanol, a designer steroid
- Havoc, an English agency for stunt performers in the 1960s/1970s run by Derek Ware
- Havok (company), an Irish subsidiary of Microsoft Research
  - Havok (software), a suite of middleware for video games, produced by Havok

== Military ==
- Douglas A-20 Havoc, a light bomber aircraft
- Havock-class destroyer, a class of torpedo boat destroyer in the British Royal Navy
- HMS Havock, the name of several British Royal Navy ships
- Mil Mi-28, a Russian attack helicopter (NATO reporting name: Havoc)

== Sports ==
- Havoc, a philosophy and style of play used by the VCU Rams men's basketball team
- Havocs, the student section of Grand Canyon University basketball
- Huntsville Havoc, a professional ice hockey team in the Southern Professional Hockey League, based in Huntsville, Alabama

== Other uses ==
- High Altitude Venus Operational Concept, a proposed NASA study

== See also ==
- Havik (disambiguation)
