= Gunbuster (video game) =

1992 video game

- Arcade flyer
- Developer: Taito
- Publisher: Taito
- Designers: T. Matsumoto; Ryuji Tominaga
- Programmers: Shinji Soyano; Hikaru Taniguchi; Takashi Ishii
- Artists: Ryuji Tominaga; Tsutomu Sekimoto; Hisakazu Katoh
- Composers: Kazuyuki Ohnui; Yasuko Yamada
- Platform: Arcade
- Release: JP: August 1992; NA: September 1992; EU: 1992
- Genre: First-person shooter
- Modes: Single-player, multiplayer
- Arcade system: Taito SZ System

Gunbuster (Note: Japanese: ガンバスター, Hepburn: Ganbasutā), released in North America as Operation Gunbuster, is a 1992 first-person shooter video game developed and published by Taito for arcades. In contrast to on-rail light gun shooters at the time, this was one of the first arcade games to feature free-roaming FPS gameplay, the same year id Software's Wolfenstein 3D was released on personal computers.

Gunbuster's control scheme consists of a joystick for movement and strafing and a light gun for aiming and turning. The player can also carry multiple weapons, each with different recharge rates and movement speeds, and the game's maps include walls, glasses and columns that can be used for dodging and shootouts. It also features multiplayer deathmatch modes for up to four players, between two teams, on a dual-monitor arcade cabinet.

== Gameplay ==
The game's control scheme consists of both a joystick and a light gun: the joystick moves the player character forwards, backwards and sidewards in a strafing maneuver, while the light gun moves the aiming reticule and turns the character around in clockwise and anti-clockwise directions, similar to later Wii Remote first-person shooters for the Wii home console. The player's arsenal consists of a primary machine gun and several secondary weapons: mines, laser, spark, and fire; each weapon has a different recharge rate and speed of movement. There is also an invincibility shield available that lasts for 15 seconds.

The mission mode can be played either as a single-player game, or a two-player cooperative game, with the second player able to join in at any time. The mission mode mostly consists of duels with bosses, across thirteen maps. In each map, the players runs through mazes trying to kill boss opponents before they kill the player. The maps include walls, glasses and columns that the player can use for dodging and shootouts.

As the first title to run on the Taito SZ System arcade system board, the game's graphics improved on Taito's previous light gun shooter Space Gun. The graphics were also more detailed and dynamic than other first-person shooters at the time, such as Wolfenstein 3D and Blake Stone; in Gun Buster's first level, for example, players can shoot out the windows in a glass elevator.

The game's competitive multiplayer mode features a head-to-head deathmatch between two teams, predating Doom's competitive multiplayer mode. It can be played either between two players, between four players with two players on each team, or between three players with two players on one team and a single player on the other team. The arcade cabinet features a dual-monitor setup, with the second screen used primarily in the deathmatch mode, for the second, third and/or fourth players.

== Plot ==
The game takes place in Agalia City, a science fiction city where cyborg crime has become rampant. In the year 2169, the city offered rewards for cyborg criminals and introduced an organization of hunters. As time passed, humanity began to refer to these hunters as "Gunbusters".

== Reception ==
In Japan, Game Machine listed Gunbuster on their October 1, 1992 issue as being the sixth most successful upright/cockpit arcade cabinet of the month. On October 15, it was listed as the fifth top-grossing upright/cockpit arcade game of the month.

In 2005, Gamasutra surveyed game developers on their favorite arcade games of all time, with one developer, Ebon Kim, citing Gunbuster as his "favorite of all time" and writing a brief review, stating that he "would play for three hours straight without putting in another quarter" and it was "fun playing against other people". He believed "Gunbuster was a revolutionary first-person shooter game" and "before its time" and that if "an upgraded version was out today, many FPS enthusiasts would flock to it and tournaments would be held" or "at least that's what I wish would happen".

== See also ==
- First person (video games)
- Star Cruiser (1988)
- The Super Spy (1990)
