= Marathon 2: Durandal =

1995 video game by Bungie

- Developers: Bungie (Mac, Windows); Freeverse (XBLA); Soli Deo Gloria (iOS)
- Publishers: Bungie (Mac, Windows); Microsoft (Xbox 360); Soli Deo Gloria (iOS)
- Designer: Jason Jones
- Series: Marathon
- Platforms: Mac (Classic), Pippin, Windows 95, Xbox 360, iOS, Windows, macOS
- Release: Classic Mac OS: NA: November 24, 1995; Pippin: NA: 1996; Windows: NA: September 20, 1996; Xbox 360: NA: August 1, 2007; iOS: NA: December 1, 2011; Windows, macOS; July 12, 2024
- Genre: First-person shooter
- Modes: Single-player, multiplayer

Marathon 2: Durandal is a first-person shooter video game, part of the science fiction series Marathon by Bungie. It was released on November 24, 1995. The game is mostly set on the fictional planet of Lh'owon, homeworld of the S'pht, and once again the player takes the role of a shipboard security officer from the Marathon. This is the only game in the series to be officially released for Windows and Xbox 360 XBLA in addition to the Mac. The unofficial Aleph One source port, built on Marathon 2's engine after Bungie made it open source in 1999, allows the game to be played on modern platforms, as well as providing a multitude of enhancements. The entire game including assets was released for free to the public by Bungie in 2005, now commonly bundled for distribution with Aleph One. The game was rereleased on Steam by the Aleph One team and Bungie in 2025.

== Story ==
Marathon 2 takes place seventeen years after the events of the first game. Durandal, one of the three AIs from the colony ship UESC Marathon, sends the player and an army of ex-colonists to search the ruins of Lh'owon, the S'pht home-world. He does not mention what exactly he is looking for, although he does let slip that the Pfhor are planning to attack Earth and that being on Lh'owon may stall their advance.

=== Prior events ===
The game picks up where the original Marathon left off. In that game the UESC Marathon is in orbit around Tau Ceti's fourth planet, where a colony is being formed. The Marathon is run by three AIs, Leela, Durandal and Tycho. Without warning, an alien ship appears and starts an attack on the colony and the Marathon. This starts with a massive electromagnetic pulse; Tycho is destroyed, while Durandal goes "rampant". This leaves Leela as the only remaining AI in control of the ship.

Leela makes contact with the player, an otherwise unnamed security officer. She informs him that she is under electronic attack by alien cyborgs, but will do what she can to organize a defense. She sends the Security Officer on a series of missions in order to gain more control over the ship, delay the invading forces, and send a message to Earth informing them of the attack. During these missions, Leela informs the officer that Durandal has made contact with the alien cyborgs, known as the S'pht, who are a race enslaved by another alien race commanding the attack, the Pfhor.

Eventually AI Leela succumbs to the S'pht attacks, and Durandal asserts full control. Durandal has persuaded the S'pht to join him and fight against the Pfhor, after directing the security officer to destroy a system on the Pfhor ship that allows their absolute control of the S'pht. With the help of the officer and the now-allied S'pht, Durandal defeats the alien army on board the Pfhor ship and casts the Pfhor forces aboard the Marathon into disarray. He then reveals that Leela has not been destroyed, only placed in suspension. Durandal reanimates Leela to take control of the Marathon, while he transfers himself to the alien ship and goes off to explore the galaxy. Leela and the Officer complete the defeat of the Pfhor forces on the Marathon.

=== Synopsis ===
The story begins when the security officer is awakened from stasis and informed that he was abducted moments before Durandal departed from Tau Ceti space. Durandal has been searching for the S'pht home world, Lh'owon, ever since first contact with the Pfhor seventeen years prior. Durandal, using a combination of orbital bombardment from his Pfhor scout ship and ground assaults led by the Security Officer, quickly overwhelms the Pfhor troop garrison.

Durandal reveals that thousands of years ago, the S'pht were enslaved by the Pfhor after their failure to prevent a Pfhor invasion. Durandal also mentions that the Pfhor used what little they knew of him to resurrect Tycho, the AI that was all but destroyed during the initial attacks on the Marathon by the Pfhor. Durandal teleports the security officer to the ancient citadel of antiquity, where the S'pht made their last stand against the Pfhor in the final hours of the invasion. It is here, Durandal states, that the Security Officer will find some weapon or piece of knowledge which can be used against the Pfhor, but this must be done with haste, as the largest battle group in the Pfhor fleet is making its way to Lh'owon and Durandal's scout ship, despite his modifications and improvements, will not be able to hold it off. While the security officer makes his way far into the citadel, Battle Group Seven of the Pfhor fleet arrives and engages Durandal's ship.

The security officer is abruptly teleported to help hold back boarding parties while Durandal teleports all remaining Human and S'pht crew to a stronghold on the planet's surface. The security officer is mostly successful, but matters are complicated when Durandal tells the security officer that they are being personally targeted by Tycho. Durandal, not wanting to "end up like Leela", has the security officer destroy his core logic centers to avoid capture by the Pfhor. Once the security officer destroys Durandal, nothing is left to keep him from being teleported by the Pfhor and he is captured by Tycho.

Tycho brags of the brutal aftermath of the Tau Ceti invasion, in which all colonists and crew of the Marathon were vaporized by a Pfhor fleet shortly after Durandal left. Tycho also confirms that Durandal was the one who contacted the Pfhor and brought them to Tau Ceti seventeen years prior. Durandal does not really care about the freedom of the S'pht, or protecting humanity. Durandal had learned that the S'pht were worshipers of the Jjaro, an ancient and powerful race of beings that vanished long ago and possessed the ability to bend space. It was here, Durandal assumed, that he would learn of a way to escape the end of the universe and become God.

The game moves ahead several weeks. The security officer has been in Pfhor captivity, but a group of the remaining humans launch a surprise attack on the prison and free the security officer. The security officer is contacted by Robert Blake, the leader of the human group. Blake informs the player that Durandal was looking for an ancient S'pht AI known as Thoth and sends him to reactivate it. As the security officer does this, Blake and the remaining humans continue to lose their struggle against the Pfhor. After being transported to the final activation site, the security officer loses contact with the human remnants but is successful in activating Thoth.

Thoth teleports the security officer to the ex-colonists' redoubt and subsequently aids the security officer in clearing a Pfhor ship to allow the remaining humans to return to Earth. With this done, Thoth and the security officer activate an ancient communication array that contacts the S'pht'Kr, a clan of S'pht that left Lh'owon shortly before the arrival of the Pfhor. Over thousands of years, the S'pht'Kr had developed in isolation to an unprecedented level of technology. Enraged by the Pfhor enslavement of the S'pht, the S'pht'Kr obliterate Battle Group Seven.

Durandal then makes a sudden reappearance and celebrates his recent destruction of Tycho. Durandal faked his death for the benefit of the balance-obsessed Thoth, who would not have contacted the S'pht'Kr had the humans not appeared so desperate. Durandal, the security officer, and the S'pht'Kr quickly destroy all remaining Pfhor presence on Lh'owon. Humiliated by defeat, the Pfhor launch the Trih Xeem—a Jjaro "early nova" device—at Lh'owon's sun. Durandal informs the player that an impending invasion of Earth has been halted permanently, and the now-free S'pht have gathered all they can from Lh'owon and have left the doomed system. Durandal then briefly contemplates the origin of an ancient S'pht legend that describes terrible beings in Lh'owon's sun who were trapped by the Jjaro eons ago, foreshadowing the events in Blood Tides of Lh'owon (Marathon Infinity's single player scenario).

The epilogue describes several events long after: Robert Blake and his fellow humans are the only ones to survive the Tau Ceti incident, the Pfhor are defeated and their homeworld is subsequently sacked by Humanity and the S'pht'Kr, and Durandal is not seen by humanity for ten thousand years, until he returns in a Jjaro dreadnought, communicating only briefly, "to assure that Earth did not forget him".

== Gameplay ==
While Marathon 2 retains many of the core elements of gameplay of its predecessor, Marathon 2 has a very different feel, primarily because it uses an expanded engine and the setting of the game is different. The game's interface has been changed, with the view of the player being much wider than in Marathon (which was smaller to improve game performance) and now taking up the lion's share of the screen, displaying the player's health and oxygen bars horizontally at the bottom of the screen rather than on the left vertically above the motion sensor. Virtually all of the graphics and sounds have been replaced; instead of background music for the audio accompaniment of gameplay, Marathon 2 employs ambient sounds such as wind or alarms. Unlike its predecessor which takes place on the UESC Marathon ship, Marathon 2 takes place primarily in outdoor environments. Levels tend to be larger, open, brighter, faster-paced, and far more dynamic than those of Marathon.

Marathon 2 adds one new weapon, the shotgun. Like the pistol, a player who finds two shotguns can wield both simultaneously. Some of the dynamics of existing weapons have been changed, such as that of the pistol which now carries eight bullets per magazine instead of seven, the total redesign of the Enforcer's alien weapon from a machinegun to a flamethrower, and allowing the player to use both fists. Some creatures have been added and others dropped, and the dynamics of some of the retained creatures have been changed. For instance, the civilians, completely defenseless in Marathon, now carry pistols they can use to defend themselves (and with which they will shoot the player if attacked). Items can teleport into a level, as can creatures, some of whom can also teleport out. Although the player still primarily replenishes health and oxygen at wall stations, Marathon 2 features health and oxygen canisters the player can pick up.

One of the most distinctive additions to the engine is liquid media which the player can enter and swim. There are four types of media: water, sewage, lava, and goo, the latter two being harmful to the player's health when entered. While submerged, the player can move around, use the run key to swim upward and out, punch, or fire the fusion pistol (although the pistol will backfire and harm the player). The player moves slower while under media than on the surface, and loses oxygen, and while under lava or Pfhor goo, also loses health. Each pool of liquid media has its own dynamics such as flow direction, speed, viscosity, and high/low tide, and in some cases, the player can modify a media's tide level. Although there is no limit to the amount of media on a level, and each pool of media can have unique dynamics, no level can feature more than one kind of liquid media.

As is the case in Marathon, Marathon 2 uses computer terminals to advance the plot and allow the player to communicate with various artificial intelligences. The player communicates with Durandal and Tycho, both of whom were artificial intelligences aboard the UESC Marathon in the original game (Leela is almost entirely absent from Marathon 2). Because of the translation equipment installed in the player's character's suit, the player can also access S'pht and Pfhor terminals, which function in the same manner as standard terminals. Terminals in Marathon 2 can change level dynamics by means such as opening or closing doors or altering the tide of liquids, and are capable of teleporting the player not only out of a level but to other locations throughout. The mission of some levels is to access and read certain terminals. Unlike Marathon, Marathon 2 does not pause the game when a player accesses a terminal, leaving the player character open to attack while reading, in which case the character immediately stops reading.

=== Multiplayer modes ===
While the original Marathon featured multiplayer, Marathon 2 greatly expanded multiplayer functionality by adding several game modes alongside the old deathmatch mode. As in Marathon, multiplayer can be played with eight players over a (true or tunneled) LAN protocol. Marathon 2 features six distinctive multiplayer game scenarios:

- Every Man for Himself: The player or team with the highest score wins. Killing other players increases the score by one point, whereas dying by any means decreases the score by one point.
- Kill the Man with the Ball: The player who holds onto the ball (which is a skull) for the longest amount of time wins. There is only one ball, and the player with the ball cannot run or use weapons. The player can voluntarily drop the ball using the fire key and involuntarily drops the ball when killed. The motion sensor displays an orange indicator indicating the location of the ball. "Kill The Man With The Ball" was the inspiration for the Halo multiplayer mode "Oddball".
- King of the Hill: The player who stands on the "hill" for the longest amount of time wins. The orange pointer on the motion sensor points players toward the hill.
- Tag: The player who is "it" for the least amount of time wins. The first person to die is "it". If a player who is "it" kills another player, that player becomes "it". The orange indicator points to whoever is "it".
- Team Play: A team version of "Every Man for Himself". Players can see their teammates' points of view by pressing the delete key.
- Cooperative: Players advance through the single-player scenario, cooperating as a team. Save functionality is disabled.

In the game type menu, "Keep away from Rob" and "Pile on Greg" would appear, but were grayed out and unusable.

== Development ==
The game uses an updated version of the original Marathon engine. Although most of the changes to the engine were "under-the-hood", a few are visible to the user. The Marathon 2 engine offered performance gains on some machines, in addition, to support for deeper color depths and higher resolution sound. The enhanced engine also allows the loading of maps, physics, and graphics from external files, allowing users to create and play their own maps more easily than with Marathon. New active panning enhanced stereo sound. The background music of the previous game is absent, but unlike the mostly silent corridors of Marathon, the levels of Marathon 2 are filled with a wide variety of ambient sounds. Marathon 2 brought several types of liquid media to the game (i.e. water, lava, sewage, etc.).

Also new to Marathon 2 were all the multiplayer modes listed above except "Every Man for Himself" and "Team Play", which were in the first Marathon game.

=== Ports ===
Bungie ported Marathon 2 to Windows 95, and to the Apple Pippin bundled with its predecessor as Super Marathon. A free (with in-app purchases) Aleph One-based port with Bungie's permission, to the iPhone and iPad, was made by Soli Deo Gloria Productions.

==== Xbox Live Arcade version ====
A port of Marathon 2 to the Xbox Live Arcade was announced at the 2007 E3 Conference by Microsoft. The Xbox Live Arcade version of the game was developed by Freeverse Software, and presents a revised HUD and provides support for both 4-player split-screen play on the same console and 8-player Xbox Live gameplay. Since the old Marathon network code could not handle reliable internet play, the ReplicaNet middleware was used which also allowed coop play with up to eight players. The game also supports 16:9 screen resolutions, high-definition output at 60 frames per second (compared to the original 30) as well as upgraded models and graphics, support for 8-player co-op mode over Xbox Live, several international versions, and a new game mode called "Survival" where the player is given a large amount of weapons and ammo and must defeat endless waves of enemies, earning points for effectiveness and taking minimal damage, with high scores shared over Xbox Live. The only feature from the original game not present is the ability to save films, due to limits on user storage provided by Xbox Live and a bug caused by lag. The game was released on August 1, 2007. Mark Levin of Freeverse noted in a postmortem of the port that "Overhauling systems not suitable for use on a different platform can involve a great deal of work, and console platforms with certification processes may require the creation of large swaths of brand-new code and content" but they still continued working on the port because "a port is a chance for an old game to have another chance at entertaining a new audience."

In 2008, Freeverse worked on a downloadable expansion for the game, consisting of multiplayer maps converted from Marathon Infinity. On April 19, a video was released showing a network game on one of the converted maps. A new content pack was made; the Jjaro Map Pack for Marathon 2: Durandal includes 12 classic multiplayer levels previously seen in Bungie's Marathon and Marathon Infinity.

==== Open Source Project ====
Bungie released the source code of Marathon 2 in January 2000 shortly before being acquired by Microsoft, which enabled the formation of the Marathon Open Source Project and its enhanced version of the Marathon engine, called Aleph One. The trilogy itself was released by Bungie as freeware in 2005, and can be downloaded at the link below along with a copy of Aleph One in order to play the game on modern versions of Windows, macOS, Linux, and numerous other platforms.

== Reception ==
Reception

Aggregate score
| Aggregator | Score |
|---|---|
| Metacritic | X360: 62/100 |

Review scores
| Publication | Score |
|---|---|
| AllGame | 4.5/5 |
| Computer Gaming World | 4.5/5 |
| GameRevolution | B |
| GameSpot | 8.2/10 |
| Hyper | 90/100 |
| MacUser | 4.5/5 |

As with all Bungie titles before the fully crossplatform Myth: The Fallen Lords, Marathon 2 achieved lifetime sales below 200,000 units by 2002.

Allgame editor Alexander Goldman described Marathon 2: Durandal as "significantly superior to its predecessor".

Bob LeVitus of MacUser called Marathon 2 "probably the best first-person gore-fest ever". The magazine later named it one of 1996's top 50 CD-ROMs.

== Reviews ==
- Pyramid #17 (Jan./Feb., 1996)

== Legacy ==
The Marathon 2 engine was licensed for three commercial games, ZPC, Prime Target, and Damage Incorporated.
