= Havik (surname) =

Havik or Håvik is a surname of Dutch origin, meaning goshawk. Notable people with the surname include:

- Doris Håvik (1924–2009), Swedish politician
- Ingrid Helene Håvik (born 1987), Norwegian songwriter and vocalist
- Martin Havik (born 1955), Dutch former road and track cyclist
- Mieke Havik (born 1957), former road cyclist from the Netherlands.
- Piotr Havik (born 1994), Dutch racing cyclist
- Yoeri Havik (born 1991), Dutch cyclist riding for SEG Racing

== See also ==
- Havik (disambiguation)
- Sander Håvik Innvær (born 2004), Norwegian footballer
