= Havik (disambiguation) =

Havik is a character in the Mortal Kombat series.

Havik or Håvik may also refer to:

- Dutch sloop Havik, a ship in the Batavian Navy captured by the Royal Navy and wrecked in 1800
- Havik (1808 ship), a 8-gun ship of the navy of the Kingdom of Holland captured by the Royal Navy
- Havik (surname)
- Håvik, a village in Stud Municipality, Vestland, Norway

== See also ==
- Havoc (disambiguation)
