= Airburst (video game) =

2001 video game

- Developer: Strange Flavour
- Publisher: Freeverse
- Platform: Mac OS
- Release: Mac: NA: 2001; XBLA: NA: TBA
- Genre: Action
- Modes: Single-player, multiplayer

Airburst is a video game developed by Strange Flavour and published by Freeverse for Mac OS. On October 25, 2007, it was announced that it would release for Xbox Live Arcade game for the Xbox 360. The Xbox 360 release was canceled but the game was available for testing on Partnernet, the private Xbox 360 developer network.

== Gameplay ==
Gameplay screenshot

The game has been described as "an inverted version of Pong", in which players divert a "deadly chainsaw-bladed burster ball" with a paddle towards other players' platforms, which are made of balloons. Each player is armed with a bat which can be used to deflect the ball away from their balloons and towards their opponents. There are also a host of power-ups that affect gameplay. The XBLA version uses ReplicaNet for online play.

== AirBurst Extreme ==
An enhanced version was released in 2004 for Mac OS X as Airburst Extreme. There are four playable characters, and six additional characters (four new protagonists and two new antagonists) in Airburst Extreme. In its review of Airburst Extreme, Macworld highlighted the sequel’s substantial improvements over the original game, particularly its faster pacing, expanded selection of arena modes, and enhanced OpenGL-based graphics. The publication described the gameplay as “fast, furious, and fun”, noting that new power-ups, Extreme abilities, and creative game types added variety and depth to the overall experience.

== In other media ==
On July 27, 2014, an animated short named AirBurst: The Soda of Doom screened at the San Diego Children's Film Festival at San Diego Comic-Con and featured characters from the games AirBurst and AirBurst: Extreme.

== See also ==
- Breakout clone
- Warlords

== Reviews ==
- ATPM.com (Original)
- Inside Mac Games (Extreme)
