= Urban Chaos: Riot Response =

- Developer: Rocksteady Studios
- Publisher: Eidos Interactive
- Designer: Paul Crocker
- Programmers: Jon Forshaw; Anthony Lloyd
- Artist: John Southgate
- Engine: Havok
- Platforms: PlayStation 2, Xbox
- Release: EU: May 19, 2006; AU: May 26, 2006; NA: June 13, 2006
- Genre: First-person shooter
- Modes: Single-player, multiplayer

Urban Chaos: Riot Response is a first-person shooter video game developed by British games developer Rocksteady Studios and published by Eidos Interactive for the PlayStation 2 and Xbox. The game was released in May 2006 in Europe and June 2006 in North America. It is Rocksteady Studios' debut game and, as of 2025, the only game by the developer to not be based on a DC Comics property as well as their only title to not receive a PC release.

== Plot ==
The player controls Nick Mason, a member of the newly formed "T-Zero" riot control squad, in an unnamed modern American city that has been overtaken by a gang known as the Burners, who are armed with cleavers, molotov bombs, rockets and firearms used to attack civilians, paramedics, firefighters and police officers. The player can defeat the gang members with various firearms to protect the city, capture gang leaders and rescue injured civilians throughout the game.

== Development and release ==
Urban Chaos: Riot Response was known by three different names during development. The game was announced by SCi Entertainment in September 2004 as Roll Call, a first-person shooter set in a run-down city in the near future, with Argonaut Games as the developer; it was planned for the PlayStation 2 and Xbox with a release in late 2005. After Argonaut underwent liquidation the following month, development shifted to Rocksteady Studios, a studio formed by ex-Argonaut employees with SCi backing, with the release pushed back to 2006; Argonaut founder Jez San would later claim in a 2022 interview that SCi intentionally misled its leadership about supporting the company during restructuring in order to poach its employees. The game was showcased at E3 2005 by SCi, whose acquisition of Eidos Interactive was finalized at the same time.

In October 2005, Eidos announced the project had become Zero Tolerance: City Under Fire, a first-person shooter following a member of an elite anti-gang unit who must defend a city under siege; a release on PC was also revealed. Technopop's former president and owner of its assets, Randel B. Reiss, made a statement in which he held the copyright for the title Zero Tolerance, and also announced that he was working on an updated version of the 1994 Zero Tolerance under the same title which was being developed for the PlayStation Portable; the statement alleged trademark infringement on Reiss' trademark and sent a "cease and desist" notice to Eidos Interactive in using the title Zero Tolerance. Eidos later renamed their game Urban Chaos: Riot Response.

The game was developed using the Havok physics engine for in-game physics effects. ReplicaNet was used to supply the software in the game's online and LAN multiplayer modes. Perforce Software's Source Control Management (SCM) System was used to manage the game's source code, documents, and digital asset development.

The game was released for the PlayStation 2 and Xbox in Europe on May 19, 2006, Australia on May 26, 2006, North America on June 13, 2006, and in Japan by publisher Spike on June 28, 2007.

The Xbox version of the game features online multiplayer. While Xbox Live for the original Xbox was shut down in 2010, Urban Chaos: Riot Response is now playable online using the replacement Xbox Live servers called Insignia.

== Reception ==
Reception

Aggregate score
Aggregator	Score	
Aggregator	PS2	Xbox
Metacritic	73/100	72/100

Review scores
Publication	Score	
Publication	PS2	Xbox
Edge	6/10	6/10
Electronic Gaming Monthly	4.67/10	4.67/10
Eurogamer	6/10	N/A
Famitsu	31/40	N/A
Game Informer	7.75/10	7.75/10
GamePro	2.5/5	2.5/5
GameSpot	7.8/10	7.8/10
GameSpy	4.5/5	4.5/5
GameTrailers	7.8/10	7.8/10
GameZone	8.5/10	8/10
IGN	7.9/10	7.9/10
Official U.S. PlayStation Magazine	3/5	N/A
Official Xbox Magazine (US)	N/A	5/10
The A.V. Club	C+	C+
Detroit Free Press	3/4	3/4

Urban Chaos: Riot Response received "average" reviews on both platforms, according to the review aggregation website Metacritic. In Japan, where the PlayStation 2 version was ported for release as Urban Chaos (Note: アーバンカオス, Āban Kaosu) and published by Spike on June 28, 2007, Famitsu gave it a score of three 8s and one 7 for a total score of 31 out of 40.
