= Marathon (1994 video game) =

First-person shooter

- CD sleeve artwork featuring the ship's crest of the UESC Marathon, the game's setting
- Developers: Bungie (Mac, Pippin); Soli Deo Gloria (iOS)
- Publishers: Bungie (Mac); Bandai (Pippin); Soli Deo Gloria (iOS)
- Designers: Jason Jones; Greg Kirkpatrick; Reginald Dujour; Alex Seropian
- Programmer: Jason Jones
- Composer: Alex Seropian
- Series: Marathon
- Platforms: Classic Mac OS; Pippin; iOS; Windows; macOS
- Release: Macintosh; December 21, 1994; Pippin; 1996 iOS; July 7, 2011; Windows, macOS; May 11, 2024
- Genre: First-person shooter
- Modes: Single-player, multiplayer

Marathon is a first-person shooter video game developed and published by Bungie, and released in December 1994 for the Apple Macintosh. The game takes place several centuries into the future in outer space and sets the player as a security officer attempting to stop an alien invasion aboard a colony ship named the Marathon.

Derived from the engine created for Pathways into Darkness from 1993, Marathon is the first game in a series of four games, which also includes its three sequels, Marathon 2: Durandal, Marathon Infinity, and Marathon, released in 1995, 1996, and 2026 respectively. In 1996, Bungie released Super Marathon, a port of Marathon and Marathon 2 to the short-lived Apple Bandai Pippin video game console.

Bungie released the source code of Marathon 2 in 1999, which enabled the development of an open-source enhanced version of the Marathon 2 engine called Aleph One. The game's assets were released by Bungie as freeware in 2005. The game was rereleased on Steam by the Aleph One team and Bungie in 2024.

== Gameplay ==
Gameplay takes place in a real-time, 3D-rendered world of ceilings and floors of various heights and widths, all viewed from a first-person perspective. All surfaces in the game are texture mapped and have dynamic lighting. The player assumes the role of a nameless security officer aboard a large colony ship called the Marathon, constructed from Mars' moon Deimos. The player controls the movement of their character primarily through use of the keyboard. Using assignable keys, they can move forward and backward, turn left or right, sidestep left or right, look up, down or forward, and glance left or right. Marathon also features free look, allowing the player to use the mouse to fire weapons and rotate their character's view. Marathon was one of the earliest computer games to employ free look and give the player the ability to look up or down. The game interface includes an overhead map, a motion sensor indicating the positions and movements of both enemies and allied characters through red triangles and green squares respectively, and bars displaying the player's current shield and oxygen levels.

The player progresses through the levels in sequence, killing enemy creatures and avoiding numerous obstacles while trying to survive. While levels are completed in a fixed order, many are non-linear and require extensive exploration to complete. Obstacles include dark and narrow passages, ceilings that crush the player, pits of harmful molten material or coolant, locked doors or platforms that must be activated by remote switches, and puzzles that may involve precise timing and speed to complete successfully. Some levels have low-gravity, oxygen-free environments and/or magnetic fields that interfere with the player's motion sensor. Rather than restoring lost health by picking up power-ups as in many first-person shooters, the player instead replenishes their shields and oxygen through activating recharge stations placed in walls; if either drops below zero, they die. Upon dying, the player revives at the last save point. The player can only save their game by locating and then activating a pattern buffer device. These devices are placed infrequently throughout the game's levels and some even lack them entirely.

Typical of the game's level design, level six, titled "Smells Like Napalm, Tastes Like Chicken", features both open areas and maze-like tunnels.

Rare among first-person shooters of its time, Marathon has a detailed, complex plot that is fundamental to gameplay and player advancement. Computer terminals placed in the openings of walls in the game serve as the primary means by which this plot is relayed. The player accesses these terminals to interface with the artificial intelligences of the Marathon, who provide information regarding the player's current objective. In most cases, the player must use specific terminals to advance to the next level of the game (via teleportation). While some levels simply require the player to reach the endpoint, on others the player must first accomplish specific tasks before they can move on, such as retrieving a specific item, flipping a switch, exploring all or part of a level, exterminating all alien creatures, or securing areas populated by human characters. Some terminals that do not need to be accessed to complete the game but still may contain additional plot information, such as engineering documents, crew diaries, or conversations between the ship's artificial intelligences. Some levels have secret terminals that are often difficult to locate, a few of which contain easter egg messages from the game's designers.

=== Engine ===
Marathon's engine, like the Jedi engine featured in Star Wars: Dark Forces, was slightly superior to the Doom engine, but not nearly as advanced as the Build engine. Like the Build engine, it was capable of a limited form of rooms over rooms and even impossible spaces, as long as the player could not see both rooms at the same time. However, it lacked mirrors, sloped floors and ceilings, destructible environments, and many of the other advanced features offered by the Build engine.

=== Multiplayer ===
A multiplayer game of Marathon. Multiplayer games can accommodate as many as eight players on a single network.

In addition to its main single player scenario, Marathon also features a multiplayer deathmatch mode that can accommodate eight players on the same local area network. One user (the "gatherer") initiates a game invitation to the computers of other players ("joiners"). Competing together in teams or individually, players score points by killing opponents and lose points by being killed by opponents; the player or team with the best kill-to-death ratio wins the match. Matches conclude after either a particular number of minutes or kills, as configured ahead of time by the gatherer when initiating the match.

Marathon's game files contain ten levels for the multiplayer mode. In addition to being inaccessible by single players, these levels also distinguish themselves from the main game environments by their designs, intended to facilitate smooth multiplayer gameplay: smaller overall level sizes, spacious areas, faster doors and platforms, fewer aliens, heavier weaponry, multiple predetermined player spawn points, strategic placement of power-ups, and an absence of pattern buffers and terminals. When a player is killed in multiplayer, they can respawn immediately at a random spawn point unless the gatherer has enabled penalties for being killed or committing suicide, which require the player to wait for a period of ten seconds or fifteen seconds respectively before reviving themselves.

Marathon's multiplayer was one of its most anticipated features prior to release and won Marathon the Macworld Game Hall of Fame Award for the best network game of 1995. Lead designer Jason Jones stated that the development of Marathon was probably delayed by a month due to time spent playing multiplayer deathmatches. The code for multiplayer was written almost entirely by Alain Roy who reportedly received a Quadra 660AV in compensation for his efforts. According to Jones, the network code is packet-based and uses the Datagram Delivery Protocol to transfer information between each machine.

== Plot ==
Marathon primarily takes place in 2794 aboard the UESC Marathon, a large Earth colony ship constructed from the Martian moon Deimos. The Marathon's mission is to travel to the Tau Ceti system and build a colony on its fourth planet. The player's character is an unnamed security officer assigned to the Marathon. The narrative is presented to the player using messages on computer terminals scattered throughout the game's levels. These messages include crew logs, historical documents, and other records, but principally include conversations that the player character has with three artificial intelligences (AIs) that run UESC Marathon: Leela, Durandal, and Tycho.

At the start of the game, the player character is aboard a shuttle returning from the colony to Marathon when an alien ship attacks the system. The officer makes his way to Marathon to find that the aliens used an electromagnetic pulse to disable much of the ship. Of the three AIs, only Leela is functional, and she guides the officer in a counter-strike against the aliens and to restore the other AIs and key systems. Leela learns that Durandal (one of the shipboard AIs) had been in contact with the aliens prior to their engagement with Marathon. The alien race, known as the S'pht, are being forced to fight by the Pfhor, an insectoid-like race. Leela soon discovers that Durandal had become "rampant" before the attack, and is able to think freely for himself. Leela aids the officer to disable Durandal's access to vital Marathon systems while sending a warning message to Earth, but in turn Durandal has the Pfhor send more forces to attack the Marathon, ultimately kidnapping the security officer. Leela intercedes to free the officer, but warns him that the S'pht attack has nearly destroyed her systems. The officer races to complete a bomb in the ship's engineering rooms, hoping it will force the Pfhor and S'pht to leave, but it is too late as Leela is "killed" by the S'pht, and Durandal takes over, forcing the officer to continue to follow his orders to stay alive.

Durandal has the officer repair the ship's transporters, allowing him to go aboard the alien Pfhor vessel. Inside, while fighting off the Pfhor, the officer discovers a large cybernetic organism that the Pfhor use to control the S'pht. The officer destroys the organism, and guided by Durandal, the S'pht revolt against the Pfhor, first on their ship, and then aboard the Marathon. With most of the Pfhor threat gone, Durandal announces his intention to transfer himself to the Pfhor ship, which the S'pht have control of, and leave with them. As a parting gift, Durandal reveals that Leela was never fully destroyed, and the S'pht release their grasp on her before departing. As the alien ship departs the system, the officer works with Leela to clear the last remaining Pfhor aboard Marathon before assessing the full damage that has been done.

== Reception ==
Reception

Review scores
Publication	Score
AllGame	4/5
Hyper	92/100
Next Generation	4/5
TouchArcade	4/5
MacUser	5/5

The demo was released on November 23, 1994 and the full version was released on December 21, 1994.

Marathon was a commercial success. At the time, Alex Seropian of Bungie said that "the customer demand for Marathon is ten-fold than it was for Pathways," leading to supply shortages. The game reached sales above 100,000 units before the release of Marathon 2. It ultimately surpassed 150,000 sales by October 1995. As with all Bungie titles before Halo: Combat Evolved, its lifetime sales were still below 200,000 units by 2002.

Next Generation reviewed the Macintosh version of the game, rating it four stars out of five, and said that "this comes highly recommended". MacUser named Marathon the best action game of 1995, ahead of Doom II.

In 1996, Computer Gaming World named Marathon the 64th best game ever. The editors wrote: "This 3D action-fest was a big reason all the Mac users kept saying 'DOOM what?'"

In a retrospective review, Allgame editor Lisa Karen Savignano gave Marathon a positive review, drawing comparisons to Doom and Duke Nukem. Savignano stated "If you like rocking and rolling, shooting and dodging, this game is for you".

== Legacy ==
Gaming historians have referred to Marathon as the Macintosh's answer to the PC's Doom, i.e. a first person shooter killer app. In 2012, Time named it one of the 100 best video games ever released.

In 1996, Bungie completed a port of Marathon to Apple's short-lived Pippin video game console. The port was released as part of Super Marathon, a compilation of Marathon and Marathon 2: Durandal which was published and distributed by Bandai rather than Bungie themselves. Super Marathon bears the distinction of being the first console game developed by Bungie, predating Oni and Halo: Combat Evolved.

In 1999, Bungie released the source code of Marathon 2, which enabled the development of an open-source enhanced version of the Marathon 2 engine called Aleph One. Though initially only M1A1 (a "total conversion" to M2's engine) could be used to play the first Marathon, Aleph One eventually gained native M1 asset support. Aleph One allows Marathon to be played on modern versions of Windows, macOS, Linux, and other platforms. It also extends multiplayer to work over the Internet via TCP/IP.

In 2000, Bungie was bought by Microsoft, financially fueling the Halo franchise. The concepts of an AI working with an armed player character continued from the roots laid out in the Marathon series.

In 2005, Bungie released the assets for the game trilogy as freeware.

An Aleph One-based port of Marathon for Apple's iPhone and iPad was released for free (the in-game purchase feature is only used to donate to the developer) on the iTunes App Store in July 2011.

On May 24, 2023, Bungie released a teaser trailer for a multiplayer reboot of Marathon, set in 2893 and described as a sci-fi PvP extraction shooter. It was released for the PlayStation 5, Xbox Series X and Series S, and PC on March 5th, 2026.

On May 11, 2024, the original game was released on Steam.
