= Double Aught =

American software company

Double Aught was a software company founded by several former members of the Bungie team (prior to Bungie's acquisition by Microsoft). Founding the company was Greg Kirkpatrick, Chris Geisel, Jihan Kim, Randy Reddig, Colin Kawakami and David Longo. The company was formed in Brooklyn prior to the 1996 release of Marathon Infinity, the third release in the Marathon series of video games.

Double Aught was responsible for creating the monster, physics, and weapons settings for the Blood Tides of Lh'owon scenario in Infinity, using the new editing tools which were subsequently released with the game.

After the release of Marathon Infinity, the company was said to have been developing another game, Duality, but folded before it could be released. Double Aught never released a game after their involvement with Marathon.
