= ZPC =

1996 video game

- Developer: Zombie LLC
- Publisher: GT Interactive
- Designer: Aidan Hughes
- Artist: Aidan Hughes
- Composers: Roland Barker; Paul Barker
- Platforms: Mac OS, Microsoft Windows
- Release: December 14, 1996
- Genre: First-person shooter
- Modes: Single-player, multiplayer

ZPC (Zero Population Count) is a first-person shooter video game which uses the Marathon 2 engine. It was developed by Zombie LLC, published by GT Interactive and released on December 14, 1996. It was noted for its stylized look adapted from artwork by Aidan Hughes (also credited with the game's concept).

== Gameplay ==
The story focuses on Arman, an exiled "Warrior Messiah" who has come of age and sets out to reclaim his throne.

== Development ==
The game had a development budget of less than $1 million.

== In other media ==
At some point prior to November 2003, Hughes announced plans to create or bring about a full-length ZPC film, but nothing came of this.

== Reception ==
Reception

Review scores
| Publication | Score |
|---|---|
| Next Generation | 4/5 (MAC) |
| MacUser | 4/5 |

Air Hendrix of GamePro found ZPC severely outdated, for both its 2D graphics and its gameplay, which he found made little advance beyond 1993's Doom. However, he remarked that the "stark, sombre visual style" and moody music would highly appeal to many, and that this would make the gameplay more enjoyable to those players. A Next Generation critic said much the same: "Gameplay sticks to the tried-and-true tactics of the legion of Doom clones ... While the level and puzzle design are entirely satisfying, ZPC would be just another pretender to the throne if it weren't for the tremendous atmosphere provided by artists Aiden Hughes and musicians Roland and Paul Barker". He elaborated that "Hughes's predominantly black and red palette and structuralist approach make ZPC one of the most unique-looking games around."
