= Damage Incorporated =

1997 video game

- Cover art by Glenn Fabry
- Developer: Paranoid Productions
- Publishers: MacSoft; WizardWorks (PC)
- Engine: Marathon 2
- Platforms: Mac OS, Microsoft Windows
- Release: 1997
- Genre: First-person shooter
- Modes: Single-player, multiplayer

Damage Incorporated is a first-person shooter for Mac OS using the Marathon 2 engine and published by MacSoft in 1997. It was ported to Microsoft Windows.

== Gameplay ==
Damage Inc. blends tactical strategy with the fast-paced action of a first-person shooter, tasking players with leading a four-member U.S. anti-terrorist squad against paramilitary threats. The game emphasizes planning and coordination—requiring players to issue commands and orchestrate their Marines' movements to succeed.

== Reception ==
Reception

Review scores
Publication	Score
Next Generation	4/5
MacUser	4.5/5
Macworld	2/5
MacAddict	"Spiffy"

Award
Publication	Award
MacHome Journal	Best Action Game

Next Generation reviewed the Macintosh version of the game, rating it four stars out of five, and stated that "If you enjoy first-person shooters, you're going to find a lot to like about this."

MacHome Journal chose Damage Incorporated for the "Best Action Game" category in their "Home Choice Awards." They wrote, "With the incorporation of the teamwork concept into a 3-D shooter, Damage Incorporated provides additional strategy and immersiveness in an exhilarating marine strike force game for a mere $30."

MacWorld wrote, "Damage Incorporated's creator admits he has no real military knowledge, and it shows." The reviewer concluded, "It's a valiant attempt to advance the first-person shooter genre by incorporating a strategic element, but poor design and uneven implementation sabotage it.
