= Marathon Infinity =

1996 video game

- Developers: Bungie; Double Aught
- Publisher: Bungie
- Series: Marathon
- Platforms: Classic Mac OS; Pippin; iOS; Windows; macOS
- Release: Macintosh; October 15, 1996 iOS; May 23, 2012; Windows, macOS; August 22, 2024
- Genre: First-person shooter
- Modes: Single-player, multiplayer

Marathon Infinity is a first-person shooter video game, the third in the science fiction Marathon series by Bungie. The game was released on October 15, 1996 and included more levels than its predecessor Marathon 2: Durandal. These levels were larger, and formed part of a more intricate plot. Marathon Infinity, unlike Marathon 2, was originally released only for the Apple Macintosh. However, Bungie released the source for Marathon 2 in 1999, allowing the development of the open-source multiplatform Aleph One engine that is also compatible with Infinity. In 2005, Bungie released the trilogy to the public as freeware, allowing the games to be freely downloaded. In 2011, Bungie released the source code for Marathon Infinity itself, preceding an official Aleph One-based port for iOS the next year that is available free (with in-app purchases). The game was rereleased on Steam by the Aleph One team and Bungie in 2025.

== Story ==
The story in the single-player version of Marathon Infinity, titled "Blood Tides of Lh’owon", is not told in an explicit fashion. The narrative begins as if large parts, if not all, of the events in Marathon 2 had not happened. At the end of Marathon 2 proper, as the Pfhor's Trih Xeem or "early nova" device is fired upon the S'pht System's sun to explode it, Durandal recounts an ancient S'pht legend in which a chaotic entity known as the W’rkncacnter — an eldritch abomination — was sealed inside of that sun by the Jjaro — a highly advanced race from centuries past, their technology being the only remnants of their existence — eons ago. The story involves the player "jumping" between alternative realities via surreal dream sequences, seeking to prevent the W’rkncacnter from being released from Lh'owon's dying sun. These jumps are apparently caused either by technology left behind by the Jjaro or by the W’rkncacnter's chaotic nature. The player begins as Durandal's ally, only to be transported almost immediately to a reality where Durandal did not rescue the player at the end of the first game, Marathon; as such, he is controlled by the Pfhor-tortured AI Tycho instead.

There are four sections to the solo levels of Marathon Infinity, each with its own intro screen. The first is Prologue, in which the player, under Durandal's control, is given a grim message about their fates. The second section is Despair, suddenly has the player under Tycho's command as mentioned previously and inevitably leads to the levels "Electric Sheep One" and "Where are Monsters in Dreams"; the latter level can lead to two choices, one of which is "Aie Mak Sicur", a level indicating a failure to complete the plot and leads to the first level of the third Chapter, Rage ("Where are Monsters in Dreams" also leads directly into Rage). The Rage chapter eventually leads to the second "Electric Sheep" level and its companion, "Whatever You Please". This pair can lead to "Carroll Street Station", another failure level; both levels lead to the final chapter, Envy. Envy leads to the third "Electric Sheep" level and the last "dream" level, "Eat the Path", which can, again, lead to multiple levels. However, it can also lead back to the Rage chapter via a final failure level ("You're Wormfood, Dude"), or to the final level, "Aye Mak Sicur".

Each of the hidden failure levels ("Aie Mak Sicur", "Carroll Street Station", and "You're Wormfood, Dude") represent a portion of the map of the final level, "Aye Mak Sicur". It becomes clear to the player as the game progresses that the ancient Jjaro station portrayed in these levels is the key to containing the W’rkncacnter, but the circumstances of the player's causality are not correct to succeed and is thus transported to a new timeline (each chapter start) to complete the necessary objectives first. None of the other characters in-game seem to be aware of the jumps in reality. The ending screen of Infinity leaves the story's resolution open-ended, taking place billions of years after the events of Marathon Infinity during the final moments of the universe. It can be surmised that both Durandal and Earth did survive in the original timeline as can be seen at the end of Marathon 2.

As a bonus, the three dream levels ("Where are Monsters in Dreams", "Whatever you Please" and "Eat the Path") all refer to a mysterious "Hangar 96". This location does not appear in any of the levels in Marathon, Marathon 2: Durandal, or Marathon Infinity. There are two equally enigmatic terminals in Marathon Infinity; one in the first level and one in the last. Each contains a large amount of hexadecimal code that can be pieced together to create a map called "Hats off to Eight Nineteen", which features a map label reading, "Hangar 96". This multiplayer arena matches grainy pictures found in terminals within the dream levels.

== Gameplay ==
Core game mechanics change little from Marathon 2 except for the addition of a new weapon, the "KKV-7 10mm SMG Flechette". The player is placed into a usually semi-nonlinear level and is generally given a task which must be completed. Upon completion of this objective, the player then proceeds to an extraction point, usually in the form of a terminal. In Infinity, there are a few major deviations. Unlike previous games, certain actions will cause the game to branch out. The game does not contain multiple endings, as these branches will eventually merge back into the main story. The game also makes much greater use of plugin physics models that change game settings from level to level. This is most evident from the player's constantly changing allies throughout the game, as almost every creature in the game will act as both allies and enemies as the game progresses. Marathon Infinity utilizes "Vacuum levels" a great deal more than previous installments in the series (only one such level appeared in the original Marathon and they were completely absent in Marathon 2). In these levels the player is restricted to certain weapons and gradually loses oxygen, failure to keep the player's oxygen supply from running out will result in death.

Multiplayer in Marathon Infinity is identical to the second game, except for new maps, such as "Beyond Thunderdome", an extension on the "Thunderdome" level in Marathon 2. Marathon Infinity also contains "House of pain", a duplicate of the Marathon 2 level, and "King of pain", a similar level to "House of pain". In total, Infinity contains 25 single-player or co-op levels, three "Vidmaster's challenges", or extra-hard levels, and 23 multiplayer maps.

== Editing tools ==
One of the most dramatic improvements in the game was the inclusion of Bungie's own level-creating software, Forge, and their physics and in-game graphics editor, Anvil. Forge and Anvil allowed a new generation of players to create their own levels and scenarios using the same tools as the Bungie developers themselves. Another improvement was the ability to include separate monsters, weapons, and physics definitions for each level, a feature heavily used by Double Aught, who designed the Marathon Infinity levels.

== Reception ==
Reception

Review scores
Publication	Score
All Game Guide	4/5
MacUser	4.5/5
MacHome Journal	5/5

All Game Guide editor Alexander Goldman described Marathon Infinity as "the standard against which other Macintosh shooters are compared".

The editors of CNET Gamecenter named Marathon Infinity the best Macintosh game of 1996 and wrote that its "design and playability [...] pushed it into the stratosphere".
