= Havoc (video game) =

1995 first person shooter video game

- The game box is made from egg carton
- Developer(s): Reality Bytes
- Publisher(s): Reality Bytes
- Platform(s): Windows, Macintosh
- Release: October 30, 1995
- Genre(s): First-person shooter
- Mode(s): Single-player, multiplayer

Havoc is a first-person shooter video game developed and published by American studio Reality Bytes for Windows and Macintosh in 1995.

== Gameplay ==
Havoc is a game in which the territories of Earth are ruled by factions which conquer other lands.

== Reception ==
Next Generation reviewed the PC version of the game, rating it four stars out of five, and stated that "With room for up to 16 players using either Macintosh, Windows 95, or both systems, Havoc could be one of the best titles available for pure multiplayer action."

=== Reviews ===
- GameSpot - September 6, 1996
- Mac Gamer (1995)
