= Extraction shooter =

Video game genre

An extraction shooter is a variant of the tactical shooter genre. It is generally defined by the gameplay style most notably seen in Escape from Tarkov. Extraction shooters are often "player versus player versus environment" (PvPvE), where players are alone or grouped into teams and placed onto a map with the goal to reach an extraction point—often within a set time limit. They may also encounter opposing players, teams and hostile NPCs. If they successfully reach the extraction point, they can keep and use any materials they obtained to improve their characters or facilities. If they do not reach the extraction point, their gear is permanently lost. In some cases, players may have other assigned objectives to complete before extraction for better rewards or progression.

== See also ==
- Action role-playing game
