= Free look =

Control option in video games

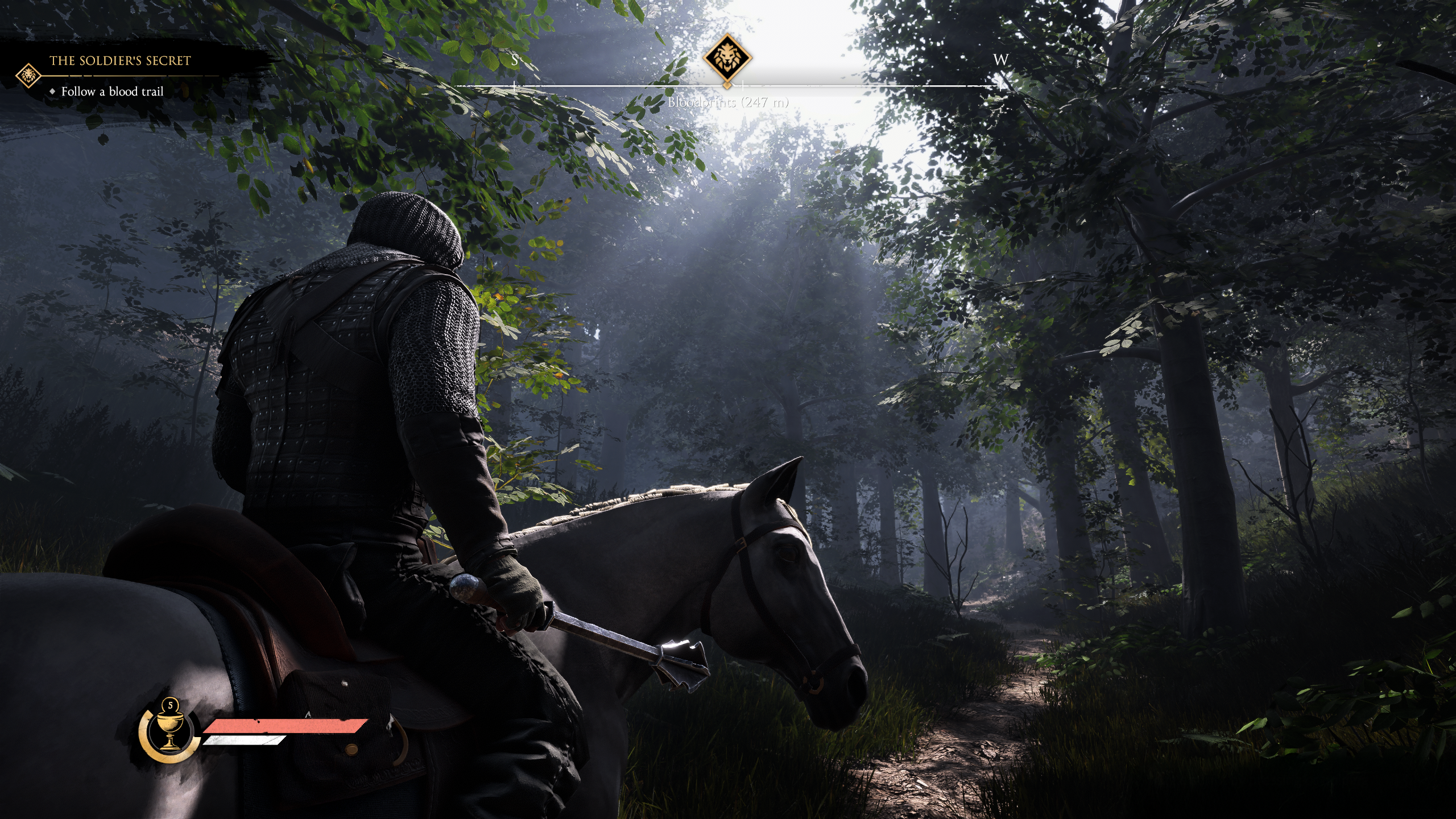
Screenshot from the 2026 video game Medieval, showing free look around hero on horse

Free look (also known as mouselook) describes the ability to move a mouse, joystick, analogue stick, or D-pad to rotate the player character's view in video games. It is almost always used for 3D game engines, and has been included on role-playing video games, real-time strategy games, shooter games, racing games, and flight simulators. Free look is nearly universal in modern games, but it was one of the significant technical breakthroughs of mid-1990s first-person perspective games. Many modern console games dedicate one of the several analogue sticks on the gamepad entirely to rotating the view, where as some older console games, when gamepads usually had fewer or only a single D-pad or analogue stick, had a feature where the single D-pad or analogue stick would move the view instead of the character whilst the player held down another button at the same time, often labelled in game as the "look button".

In games whose free-look systems are controlled fluidly via a pointing device, such as a mouse or the Wii Remote's infrared pointer, the camera will change angle when the cursor moves near an edge of the screen. To lock the camera angle, the player can position the cursor in a central region of the screen called a dead zone, named so in that it prevents the camera from moving. This allows the player to keep a steady focus on what lies forward, and the extent and size of the dead zone may be customizable in certain games.

== History ==
Fully 3D first-person games with restricted free look had appeared as early as 1992 on IBM PC compatibles, allowing the player to look up and down, although vision was controlled by dedicated keys rather than the mouse. At the time it was still cutting-edge technology and didn't become widespread until the age of 3D accelerators. Ultima Underworld: The Stygian Abyss, released in March 1992, as well as the later System Shock (which was made on the same engine), allowed the player to manipulate the camera, looking left, right, up or down by using dedicated keys or by using the mouse to click on the edges of the screen.

Taito's first-person shooter arcade video game Gunbuster, released in August 1992, has a unique control scheme where the player moves using an eight-direction joystick and takes aim using a mounted positional light gun. The player could turn left or right by moving the gun pointer to the left or right edges of the screen. However, the game lacked the ability to look up or down.

In the 1993 game Doom, it was not possible for the player to angle the view up or down, though Raven Software's Heretic, based on the same engine as Doom and released in 1994, added a restricted free look to the engine. Dark Forces was released in 1995 and featured 3D look, but more restricted than the free look of the earlier Ultima Underworld and System Shock.

Raven Software's November 1994 release CyClones has a basic implementation of the free look; main movement was via keyboard (with turning and strafing via key combinations), but the on-screen weapon aim point was moved independently via the mouse. Moving the aim point to the edge of the screen would cause the viewpoint to temporarily shift up or to the side. This system proved cumbersome and Raven Software did not develop this particular system further. The 1993 MS-DOS version of Bram Stoker's Dracula also used the mouse to aim the player's weapon cross-hair, similar to CyClones, but the player's viewpoint was controlled entirely by the keyboard and did not move with the cross-hair.

The next major step was using the mouse to control the free look. Marathon by Bungie, released in December 1994 for the Apple Macintosh was the first major release with the mouse-controlled free look that would later become universal. The first major game for PC to allow mouselook was Descent; it was not the default control mapping, but quickly became the de facto due to the game's inherent need to constantly be able to look in all three dimensions. The first game with full-time fully 3D mouselook by default was Terminator: Future Shock (published by Bethesda Softworks in 1995). However, Terminator: Future Shock was not popular and the original Marathon was Mac-only, so their impact was limited. Quake (1996), is widely considered to have been the turning point in making free look the standard, in part due to its Internet multiplayer, which allowed large numbers of mouse and keyboard players to face each other head-to-head, and proved the superiority of mouselook over keyboard-only controls. Although games using older engines continued to appear for a few years, the 3D accelerator boom in the mid-1990s meant that for the first time true 3D engines could be run on home PCs, and free mouselook would rapidly become essential and standard in almost every 3D game.

GoldenEye 007 (1997) extended the spread of this technique, introducing it to consoles by incorporating the manual aiming of Sega's light gun shooter Virtua Cop (1994) in its first-person shooter gameplay. According to creator Martin Hollis: "We ended up with innovative gameplay, in part because we had Virtua Cop features in a FPS: A gun that only holds 7 bullets and a reload button, lots of position dependent hit animations, innocents you shouldn’t kill, and an aiming mode. When you press R in GoldenEye, the game basically switches to a Virtua Cop mode."

== See also ==
- Virtual camera system
