= MacUser =

British computer magazine, 1985–2015

- Editor: Adam Banks
- Categories: Computing, Macintosh
- Frequency: Monthly
- First issue: 1985
- Final issue: 2015
- Company: Dennis Publishing Ltd.
- Country: United Kingdom
- Language: English
- Website: www.macuser.co.uk

MacUser was a monthly (formerly biweekly) computer magazine published by Dennis Publishing Ltd. and licensed by Felden in the UK. It ceased publication in 2015.

In 1985 Felix Dennis’ Dennis Publishing, the creators of MacUser in the UK, licensed the name and “mouse-rating” symbol for MacUser to Ziff-Davis Publishing for use in the rest of the world. The UK MacUser was never linked to the US MacUser. When Ziff-Davis merged its Mac holdings into Mac Publishing in September 1997, that new company gained the license to use the MacUser name. However, it opted to keep the Macworld magazine brand-name alive, albeit with MacUser-style mouse ratings. As a result, only the original UK-based MacUser remains, and the UK edition of Macworld is unable to use the mouse rating symbols used by its fellow Macworld editions.

The UK magazine was aimed at Mac users in the design sector, and each issue brought the reader up-to-date with news, reviews, ‘Masterclass’ tutorials and technical advice. Masterclasses take the reader through tasks such as photo retouching, design techniques, and creating movies.

== Staff ==
As of 2011, notable staff of the magazine included:

- Editor in Chief - Adam Banks
- Technical Editor - Keith Martin
- Contributing Features Editor - Nik Rawlinson
- Contributing Graphics Editor - Steve Caplin
- Contributing Products Editor - Kenny Hemphill
- Contributing Writer - Alan Stonebridge
- Production editor/sub-editor/layout - Kirsty Fortune
- Publisher - Paul Rayner

== See also ==
- MacUser (US edition)
